= Olivera =

Olivera is the female version of Oliver, with Oliveras also a Catalan surname. Notable people with the surname include:

- Alejandra Oliveras (1978–2025), Argentine boxer
- Alfredo Olivera (1908–?), Uruguayan chess master
- Baldomero Olivera (born 1941), Filipino chemist
- Érika Olivera (born 1976), Chilean marathon runner
- Fernando Olivera, numerous people
- Héctor Olivera, numerous people
- Ian Olivera (born 2004), Andorran football player
- Joaquín Enrique Valerio Olivera (born 1973), Spanish football player
- Juan Manuel Olivera (born 1981), Uruguayan football player
- Mako Oliveras (born 1946), Puerto Rican baseball player and manager
- Marcelo Olivera (born 1999), Argentine footballer
- Nicolás Olivera (born 1978), Uruguayan football player
- Rubén Olivera (born 1983), Uruguayan football player

== See also ==
- Estadio Atilio Paiva Olivera, stadium in Rivera, Uruguay
- Olivera, Buenos Aires, in Argentina
- Olvera (disambiguation)
- Oliveria (disambiguation)
- Oliveira (surname)
- Olivero (surname)
- Oliveros (surname)
