= Oliveria (disambiguation) =

Oliveria may refer to:

- Oliveria, a monotypic genus of plants containing the species Oliveria decumbens
- Utricularia sect. Oliveria, a botanical section

== People with the name ==
- Melody Oliveria or bowiechick, YouTube personality
- Oliveria Prescott (1843–1919), English writer and composer

== See also ==
- Oliveira (disambiguation)
- Oliver (disambiguation)
- Olivera, a feminine name
