= San Martín Line =

Railway line in Buenos Aires, Argentina

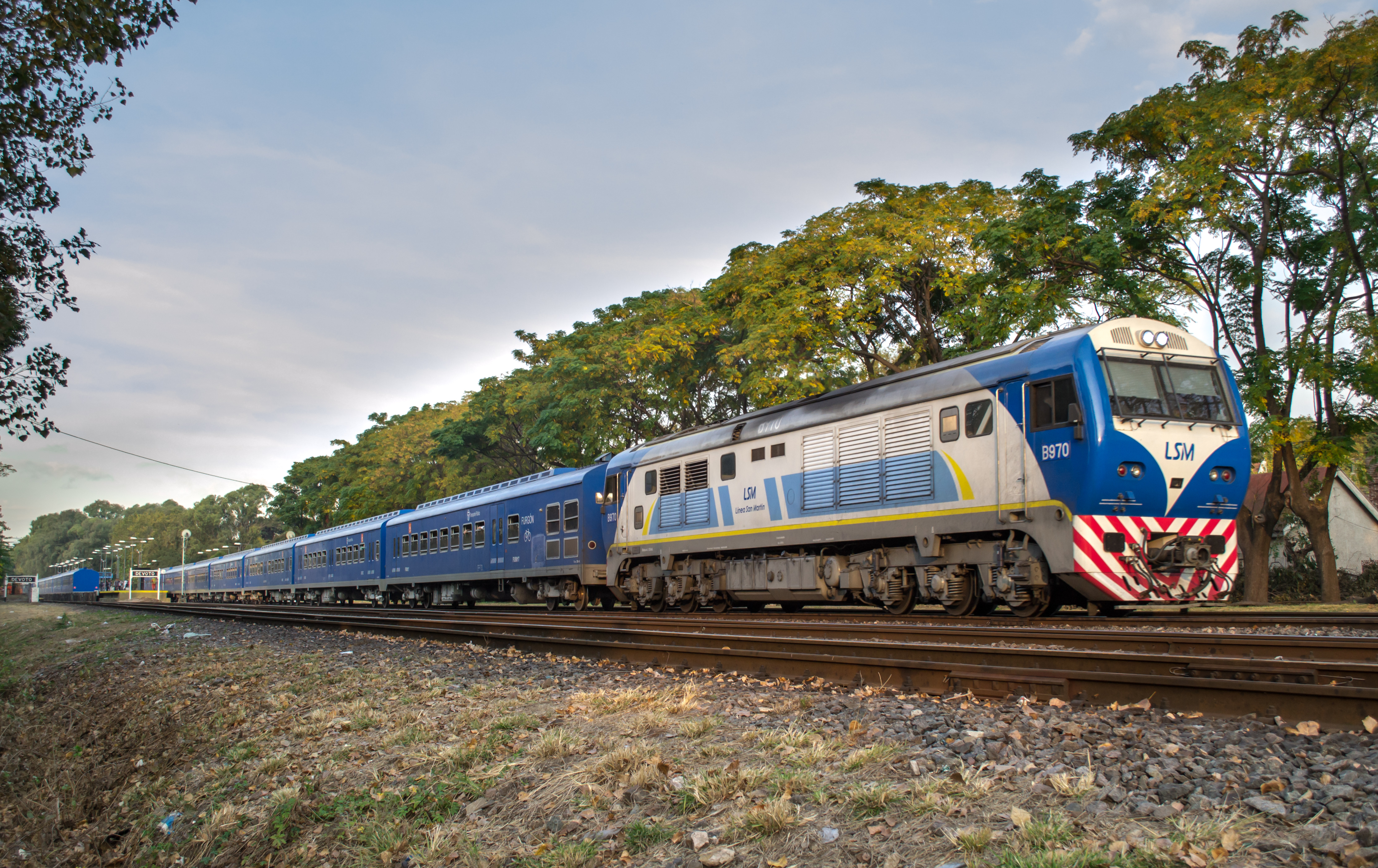
- A CSR SDD7 train leaving Villa Devoto station.

Overview
- Service type: Commuter rail
- Status: Active
- Locale: Buenos Aires Province
- Predecessor: BA & Pacific R.
- First service: 1948; 78 years ago
- Current operator: Trenes Argentinos
- Former operator: Corredores Ferroviarios
- Website: San Martín Line

Route
- Termini: Retiro; Dr. Cabred
- Stops: 22
- Distance travelled: 72.5 km (45.0 mi)
- Average journey time: 75 minutes
- Service frequency: 15 minutes

On-board services
- Class: Standard class only

Technical
- Track gauge: 1,676 mm (5 ft 6 in)
Route map

The San Martín line is a 70-kilometre (43 mi), 22-station commuter rail service in the metropolitan area of Buenos Aires, Argentina. The San Martín line operates from the city-centre terminus of Retiro station north-west to Doctor Cabred in Luján Partido along a broad gauge line built by the British-owned Buenos Aires and Pacific Railway.

The line is currently operated by the state-owned company Operadora Ferroviaria Sociedad del Estado (SOFSE) after the Government of Argentina rescinded the contract with former operator Corredores Ferroviarios in March 2015. Passenger numbers in 2015 beat historical records for the line, which has been largely attributed to the newer rolling stock and refurbished stations.

== History ==
=== Background ===
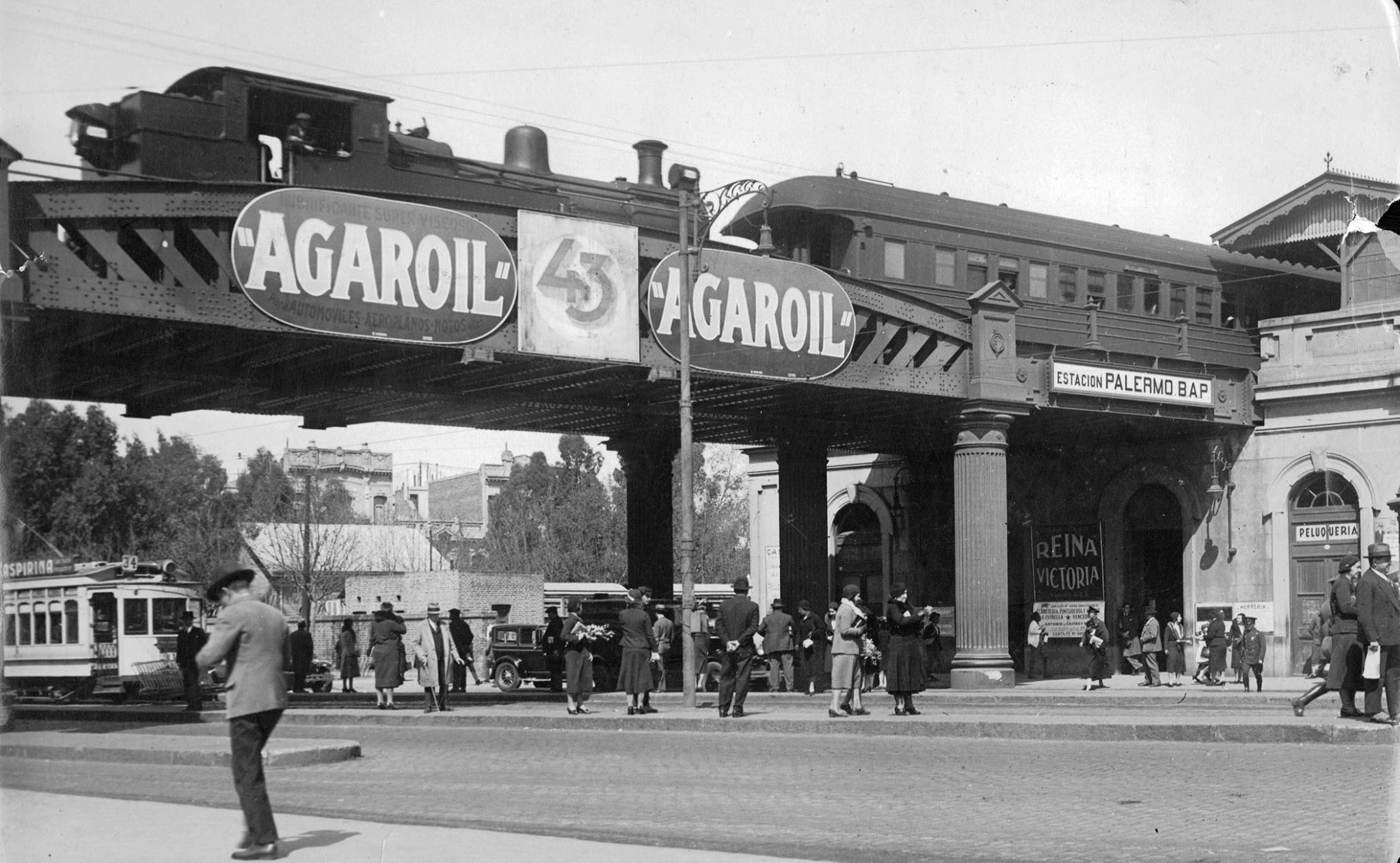
A BAP steam locomotive in Palermo, Buenos Aires (c.1930)

The first line had been built and operated by the Buenos Aires and Pacific Railway, a British-owned company. The original projects included a railway to connect Argentina and Chile, but instead the BAPR focused on getting access to Buenos Aires. When the Government of Argentina granted concession to build the line, the company opened a 100-km length Mercedes−Palermo segment.

=== Ferrocarriles Argentinos ===
On 13 February 1947, the Government of Argentina acquired the Buenos Aires and Pacific Railway, changing its name to Ferrocarril General San Martín one year later when the entire Argentine railway network nationalised by Juan Perón's administration. Immediately after nationalisation, there was a project to electrify the line, however this never came to fruition.

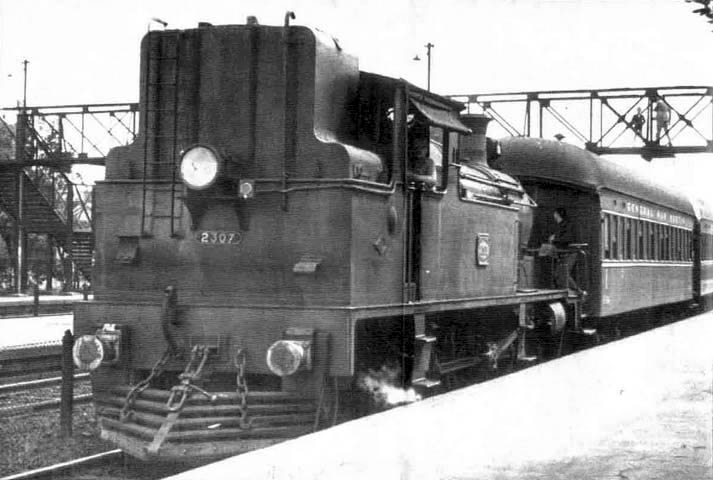
A train in Greater Buenos Aires, c. 1960

During the 1960s the line was restructured, renewing its rolling stock. Therefore, the steam locomotives of San Martín line were replaced by diesel ones. The old coaches made of wood were also replaced by new wagons manufactured in Fiat Ferroviaria (then Materfer) factory in Córdoba Province.

In the 1970s the modernisation continued, renewing signals and rail tracks. In addition, most of the stations were remodelled while the orange colour was adopted to identify the line.

In 1978 a restructuring of the San Martín line was carried out by the de facto Military Government, so the terminus was set in Pilar, Buenos Aires Province. From that point on, Doctor Cabred (former terminus) and intermediate stop Manzanares were used for long-distance services exclusively, something which was reverted in later years.

=== Privatisation: Metropolitano ===
With the privatisation of the entire rail network led in the early 1990s by President Carlos Menem, Ferrocarriles Argentinos ceased to operate metropolitan services. A new State-owned transitional company, Ferrocarriles Metropolitanos S.A., was created to operate those services until they were privatised.

On 1 March 1994, private company Metropolitano (TMS) took over the line, which it operated until 7 January 2005, when the contract was revoked by the Government of Argentina. In spite of the large government subsidies received by TMS, a serious decline in the standard of their rail services has led to the original concession being revoked and the service was taken over by the consortium UGOFE.

=== Transition ===
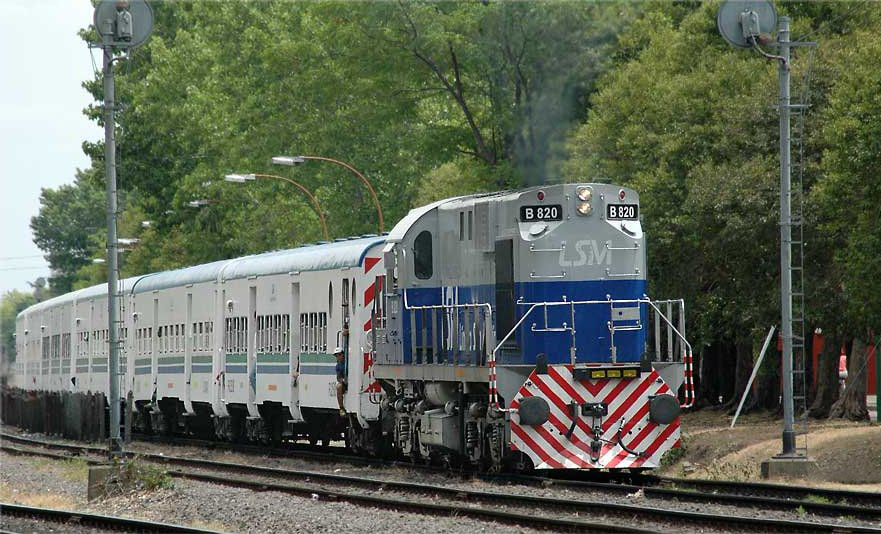
A train while being operated by UGOFE before nationalisation (2005)

With the line managed by UGOFE, several projects were announced to improve the San Martín line services, with an estimated 36 million passengers transported yearly and which were seeing an annual increment of 15% in ridership. In 2008 the Government of Argentina announced that the electrification using overhead lines for the whole system was to be started in June 2008. The project also included a new maintenance yard, new tracks for the entire line with all level road crossings to be eliminated and replaced with bridges and tunnels. . New rolling stock consisting of 24 diesel-electric CSR SDD7 locomotives and 160 coaches arrived from China to serve the line, which raised questions about the line's electrification.

On February 12, 2014, the operation of San Martín Line was granted to private company Corredores Ferroviarios. In April of the same year the San Martín line completed the modernisation of its entire fleet, putting into service 24 CSR SDD7 diesel locomotives and 160 coaches acquired from Chinese company CSR. The units had been bought in 2008 but they were unable to run so the stations had to modify their platforms for the new coaches. Once works were concluded, the Chinese trains made their debut in Argentina. The new rolling stock completely replaced the Materfer trains built in the 1960s and 1970s.

=== Renationalisation ===
Train with CSR SDD7 locomotive arriving at Devoto station in 2014

State-owned company Operadora Ferroviaria Sociedad del Estado took over Belgrano Sur and Roca (operated by Argentren) and Mitre and San Martín (operated by Corredores Ferroviarios) lines after the Government of Argentina rescinded the contracts signed with both companies on March 2, 2015. The contract terms specified that the concession could be cancelled with no right to claim compensation. The agreements had been signed in February 2014, committing Argentren and Corredores Ferroviarios to operate the lines.

=== Expansion ===
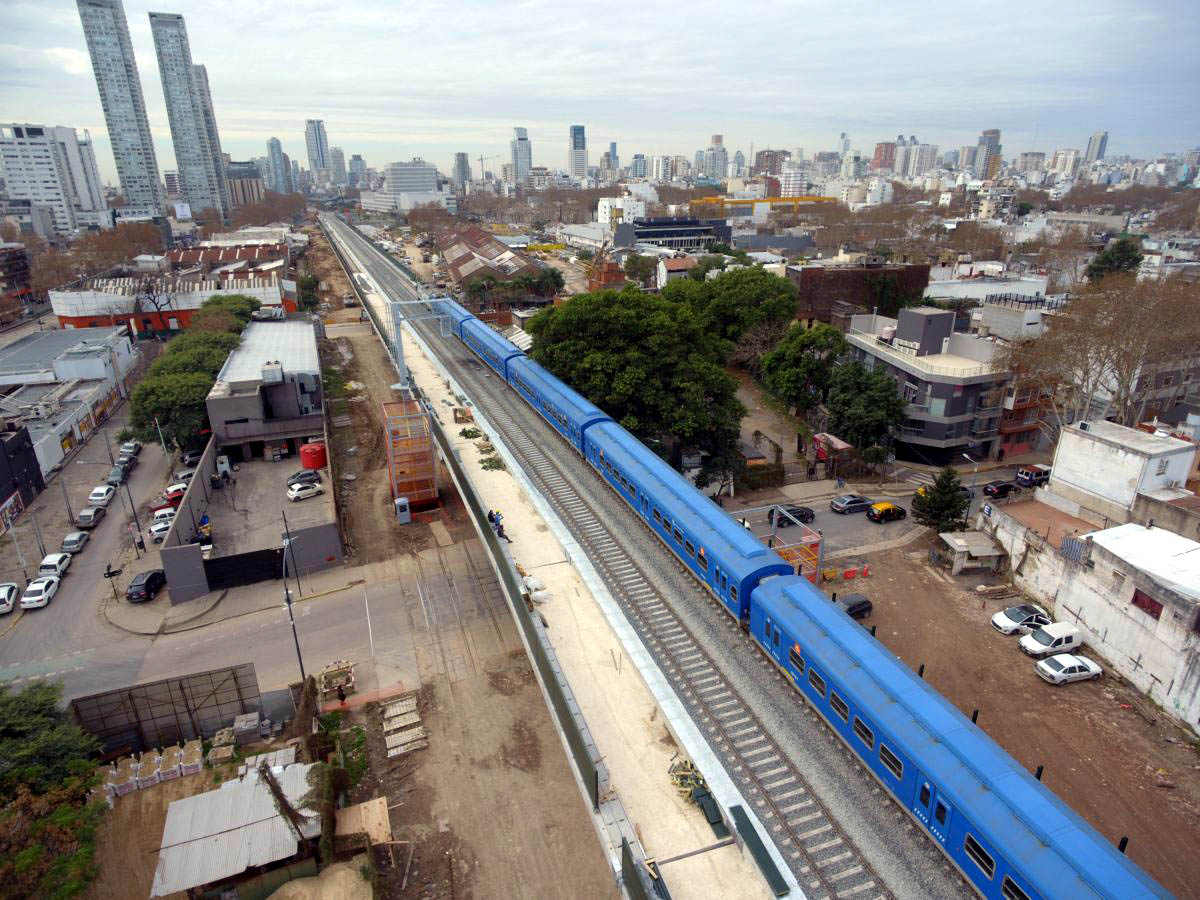
The San Martín viaduct from Palermo to La Paternal, inaugurated in 2019

In December 2014, plans were made between the Ministry of the Interior and Transport and City of Buenos Aires to elevate the entire line using a new viaduct from La Paternal station to the existing viaduct at Palermo station, together with a similar project for the belgrano Sur Line. Both governments cited benefits such as the improvement of road traffic and rail frequencies as reasons for building the 4.9 km (3.0 mi) viaduct.

The section from Retiro to Villa del Parque (set as provisional terminus while works were in progress) was closed in 2018, as a new viaduct (with an extension of 5 km) was being installed between intermediate stations Palermo and La Paternal to eliminate 11 level crossings in the city. Villa Crespo (formerly, "Chacarita") was closed in 2017 and La Paternal one year later. The viaduct was inaugurated in July 2019, although the COVID-19 pandemic caused delays so both stations remained closed. La Paternal was reopened in July 2022, while Villa Crespo remains closed as of May 2023.

In 2023 it was announced that the branch connecting the Caseros and Haedo stations (which had been abandoned for decades) would be re-opened for passenger services. Three new stops would be built for that purpose. The branch had been built and opened by the Buenos Aires Western Railway in 1908, connecting the San Martín, Roca and Sarmiento lines. As of 2023, the tracks are run only by freight services operated by Trenes Argentinos Cargas.

=== Historic operators ===
Companies that have operated the San Martín Line since it was established after the 1948 nationalisation are:

Operator	Period
Ferrocarriles Argentinos	1948–1991
FEMESA	1991–1994
Metropolitano	1994–2005
UGOFE	2005–2014
Corredores Ferroviarios	2014–2015
Trenes Argentinos	2015–pres.

== Electrification ==
The electrification of the San Martín line has been an ongoing issue, especially given that it is the only broad gauge line in Buenos Aires not to be electrified. Interest in electrifying the line came about as early as 1907 when it was still part of the Buenos Aires and Pacific Railway. More concrete plans emerged in 1947 which included elevating the track through the centre of the city, however, with the nationalisation of the railways in 1948, these plans were shelved.

By 1987, these plans were revisited and Ferrocarriles Argentinos signed a contract with the Soviet company Tecnostroyexport to use 25 kV AC railway electrification like that recently installed on the Roca Line, with the difference that electric locomotives would be used to pull the existing carriages instead of purchasing new Japanese Electric Multiple Units like on the Roca Line. The collapse of the Soviet Union and economic problems in Argentina slowed the plans down and the privatisation of the railways in 1993 ultimately led to its cancellation.

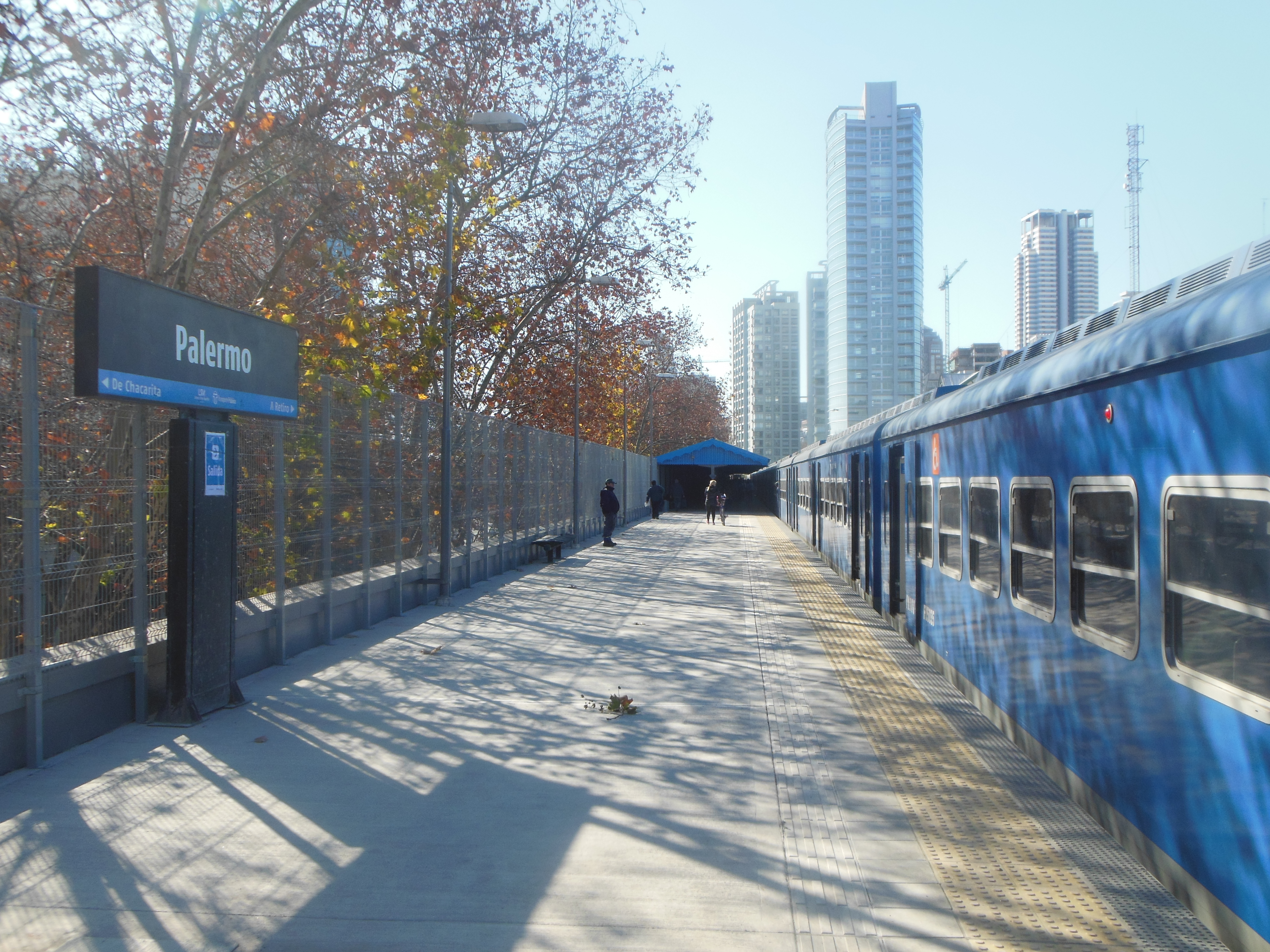
Palermo station after refurbishment in 2014

The electrification of the line was not discussed again until 2008 when the Government of Argentina announced that electrification using overhead lines for the whole system was start in June 2008. In 2014, 24 CSR SDD7 diesel locomotives and 160 coaches acquired from Chinese company CSR were put into service, seemingly putting any electrification plans on hold, but that same year the Minister of the Interior and Transport Florencio Randazzo stated that the project was still on the table. Similarly, in 2014 when the construction of a new 4.9 km (3.0 mi) viaduct through the centre of the city was announced (similar to the one proposed in 1947), the artists impressions presented showed overhead lines along the viaduct. Similarly, the Red de Expresos Regionales plan from the City of Buenos Aires showed the line as already being electrified.

The national government announced in September 2015 that China Railway Construction Corporation was carrying out a feasibility study to assess the electrification of the line. A month earlier, the Ministry of the Interior and Transport had announced the possibility of financing the line's electrification through the Inter-American Development Bank. Presumably, the diesel-electric rolling stock would be moved to other broad gauge diesel services in the country.

== Services ==
Current San Martín Line services as of May 2023:

Start	End	Km.	Time
Retiro	Dr. Domingo Cabred	72.5	112'
