= Oliveros =

Oliveros may refer to:

- Oliveros, Santa Fe, a town in Argentina
- Oliveros (surname), a Spanish surname
- Oliveros cigars, a brand manufactured by Boutique Blends Cigars since 1996
- Oliveros House, historica building in St. Augustine, Florida, United States of America

== See also ==
- Olivero (surname)
- Oliveira (disambiguation)
