= Fernanda Oliveira =

Fernanda Oliveira may refer to:

- Fernanda Oliveira (sailor) (born 1980), Brazilian sailor
- Fernanda Oliveira (dancer) (born 1980), Brazilian ballet dancer

== See also ==
- Fernando Olivera (disambiguation)
- Fernando Oliveira (born 1984), Brazilian footballer
