= RER =

RER may refer to:

== Transport ==
=== In France ===
- Réseau Express Régional, or RER d'Île-de-France, the commuter rail service serving Paris and its suburbs

=== In Belgium ===
- Réseau express régional Bruxellois ('Brussels Regional Express Network'), the commuter rail service serving Brussels and its suburbs and commuters
- Réseau Express Régional Gantois ('Ghent Regional Express Network'), the commuter rail service serving Ghent and its suburbs and commuters

=== In Switzerland ===
- Réseau Express Régional Bernois, the name used for the Bern S-Bahn in French speaking areas.
- Réseau Express Régional franco-valdo-genevois, now called Léman Express, commuter rail service serving Geneva, Annemasse and its suburbs
- Réseau Express Régional Fribourgeois, commuter rail service serving Fribourg and its suburbs
- Réseau Express Régional jurassien, commuter rail service serving the canton of Jura
- Réseau Express Régional trinational de Bâle, the name used for the Basel S-Bahn in French speaking areas.
- Réseau Express Régional Vaudois, commuter rail service serving Vaud and its suburbs

=== In Argentina ===
- Red de Expresos Regionales, a planned commuter rail service in Buenos Aires

=== In Canada ===
- GO Regional Express Rail, now known as GO Expansion, a planned commuter rail service in Toronto and its suburbs

== Other uses ==
- Rebuilt Reading electric multiple units
- The Real Estate Roundtable, a non-profit public policy organization that represents the interests of real estate
- Real exchange rate, the purchasing power of a currency relative to another at current exchange rates and prices
- RēR, the standard abbreviation for the label Recommended Records
- Resident Evil: Revelations, 2012 video game
- Resident Evil Requiem, 2026 video game
- Respiratory exchange ratio, the ratio between the amount of carbon dioxide produced in metabolism and oxygen used
- Rough endoplasmic reticulum, a type of endoplasmic reticulum protein-manufacturing ribosomes
