= Paulo Ramos =

Paulo Ramos may refer to:

- Paulo Ramos, Maranhão, a municipality in Brazil
- Paulo Ramos (footballer) (1985–2009), Brazilian midfielder
