= Roffo =

Roffo is a surname. Notable people with the surname include:

- Ángel Roffo (1882–1947), Argentine medical doctor
- Joseph Roffo (1879–1933), French sportsman
- Manuel Roffo (born 2000), Argentine footballer
