= Fernando de Oliveira =

Fernando de Oliveira can refer to:

- Fernão de Oliveira (1507–1581), Portuguese grammarian and humanist
- Fernando Oliveira (b. 1984), Brazilian footballer
