= Fernando Olivera =

Fernando Oliveira may refer to:

- Fernando Olivera (politician) (born 1958), Peruvian politician
- Fernando Olivera (footballer) (born 1998), Uruguayan footballer

== See also ==
- Fernanda Oliveira (disambiguation)
- Fernando Oliveira (born 1984), Brazilian footballer
