= Domingo Cabred =

Argentine psychiatrist (1859–1929)

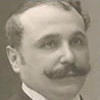
- Born: Domingo Felipe Cabred; 20 December 1859; Paso de los Libres, Corrientes, Argentina
- Died: 27 November 1929 (aged 69); Buenos Aires, Argentina
- Occupations: Physician, psychiatrist, public health official
- Known for: Founding the first Open door colony for the insane in Latin America

Domingo Felipe Cabred (20 December 1859 – 27 November 1929) was an Argentine physician, psychiatrist, and public health official. He established the first open-door treatment facility for the insane in the town of Open Door in Buenos Aires Province, after which the town is named. This type of colony was the first of its kind in Latin America.

== Education and early work ==
Cabred received his Doctor of Medicine degree from the Faculty of Medicine at the University of Buenos Aires in 1881 with a thesis titled Contribución al estudio de la locura refleja, specializing in the treatment of the mentally ill, who at the time were referred to as the "insane". He wrote articles and pamphlets on mental illnesses, some in collaboration with Ángel Roffo and José Tiburcio Borda.

Cabred worked as an intern for three years at the Hospicio de Mujeres (Women's Hospice) and later as a staff physician at the Hospicio de las Mercedes (Mercedes Hospice), of which he became director in 1892. It was here that he implemented new treatments and improved others. He proposed the creation of a "Course in Psychiatric Clinic" for the Faculty of Medicine at the University of Buenos Aires. This was established in 1886, with Lucio Meléndez appointed as its director. Additionally, he began working as a university professor in 1887 after winning a competitive examination, rising to the position of full professor in 1892.

=== Hospicio de las Mercedes ===
The Hospicio de las Mercedes was an asylum for men founded in 1863, providing specialized medical care to the mentally ill. One of its directors was Dr. Lucio Meléndez, who in 1879 presented a project to the Municipality of Buenos Aires to found a Colony for the Insane on an estate located in the province; Meléndez proposed this initiative with the aim of ending the overcrowding caused by the excess of mentally ill patients arriving from the provinces. These individuals were abandoned on the streets of Buenos Aires and subsequently collected by the police, who sent them to the hospice. Some immigrants were also interned, as they arrived with hopes and their minds became alienated due to the difficulty of survival.

Cabred, who succeeded Meléndez as director of the hospice, secured the support of fellow physician Eliseo Cantón, who was a National Deputy for Tucumán Province. Cantón succeeded in getting Law No. 3,548 approved in 1897, which ordered the creation of a National Colony for the Insane "subject to the rules of the new Scottish system of hospitalization and medical care of the open-door asylums".

== Representation of Argentina ==
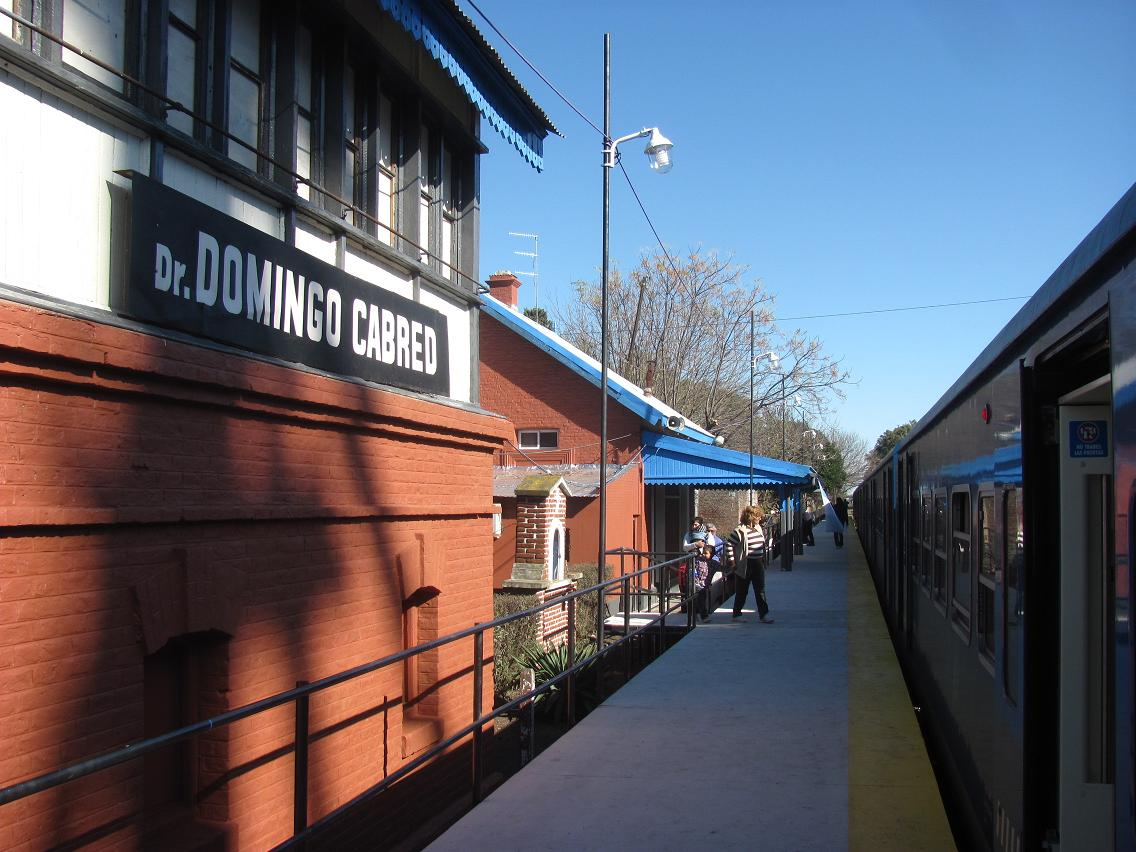
View of the Dr. Domingo Cabred Station in Open Door, Luján Partido

Cabred traveled to Europe, where he studied at universities and clinics in Germany, Austria, and France, in addition to representing Argentina at various congresses and on study trips. In this way, he achieved national and international recognition.

In 1888, Cabred undertook a trip through Europe during which he observed and studied the organization and functioning of several hospices on the continent, as well as institutes for the deaf-mute. A year later, in 1889, he was the Argentine representative at the International Congress of Mental Medicine, held in the city of Paris; at this congress he was appointed Honorary President.

He represented his country at the National Congress of Criminal Anthropology held in 1896 in Geneva, Switzerland. It was there that he proposed a motion, which was approved, arguing that "insane delinquents"—referring to those mentally ill individuals who had committed a crime—should not be housed in special sections of prisons, but should be treated in hospices and specialized institutions. This idea proposed by Cabred remains valid today.

Consequently, Cabred created a department with these characteristics at the Hospicio de las Mercedes, which would be the first of its kind in South America. In 1900, he created the Institute of Psychiatry, which was subsequently annexed to the Faculty of Medicine of the University of Buenos Aires. Cabred was considered an "illustrious neurologist" in national scientific circles, being honored on several occasions. One of these was his appointment as an honorary member of the National Department of Hygiene.

== Works ==
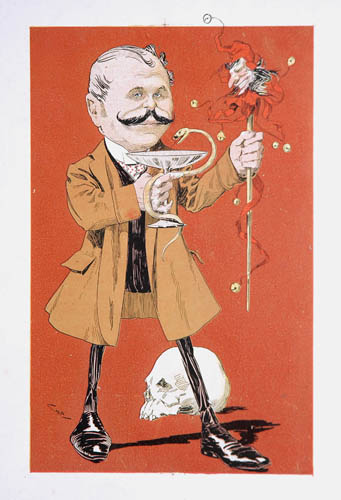
Caricature of Cabred, made in 1902 by José María Cao for the magazine Caras y Caretas.

=== Argentine League against Alcoholism ===
In 1903, Cabred founded the Argentine League against Alcoholism, motivated by his studies, in which he maintained that the excessive consumption of alcohol destroyed and damaged the individual and their personality.

=== National Colony for the Insane ===
In 1899, he founded the National Colony for the Insane, generally known as the Dr. Domingo Felipe Cabred National Psychiatric Colony or Colonia Open Door, an establishment where patients were treated on an "open-door" basis, from which the town of Open Door derives its name. The treatment was carried out in an open asylum, which employed methods that were very advanced for the time. This colony was the first of its kind in Latin America.

The establishment operated on a system of self-sufficiency, as it had its own dairy, plant nursery, farm, and vegetable garden. Following the settlement of the colony, the first plots of land in the area were subdivided. Producers in the region sent their products, mainly milk and grains, by railway to Buenos Aires, and even supplied the colony.

The book Octavas Jornadas de Historia del Pensamiento Científico Argentino, published by the Foundation for the Study of Argentine and Ibero-American Thought, highlights that Dr. Cabred characterized "correction methods - cellular confinement/shower/straitjacket - as a cruel trilogy demeaning to human dignity" and "those implemented in the Open Door method - freedom/work/physical and moral well-being - as a modern, scientific, and humanitarian trilogy".

== Later years ==
During the last years of his life, Cabred worked at the Hospicio de las Mercedes, where he wrote numerous articles and medico-legal reports related to psychiatry, which were published in scientific journals. Some of these dealt with the study of diseases in Europe; notable among these are Memoria sobre los asilos de Italia ("Report on the Asylums of Italy"), Memoria sobre la organización de los asilos de alienados en Inglaterra ("Report on the Organization of Asylums for the Insane in England"), and Estudio sobre los asilos abiertos en Alemania ("Study on Open Asylums in Germany"). Cabred died in the city of Buenos Aires on 27 November 1929, at the age of 69.

== Publications ==
Cabred wrote nineteen publications, including his thesis, some articles, speeches, and talks for conferences. His works are listed here:

Title	Type of work	Publisher	Place	Year
Contribución al estudio de la locura refleja (Contribution to the study of reflective madness)	Thesis	Imp. La Nación	Buenos Aires	1881
Efectos terapéuticos de la estricnina en el alcoholismo (Therapeutic effects of strychnine in alcoholism)		N/D ^{*}	N/D	N/D
La edad en la parálisis general (Age in general paralysis)		N/D	N/D	N/D
Memoria sobre la organización de los asilos de alienados en Inglaterra (Report on the organization of mental asylums in England)		N/D	N/D	N/D
Memoria sobre los asilos de Italia (Memoir on the Asylums in Italy)		N/D	N/D	N/D
Memoria sobre los institutos de sordo-mudos en Francia (Report on schools for deaf-mutes in France)		N/D	N/D	N/D
Estudio sobre la clasificación de enfermedades mentales presentadas en el Congreso Internacional de Medicina Mental (Study on the classification of mental illnesses presented at the International Congress of Mental Medicine)	Official Report	N/D	Paris	1889
Informe sobre el Congreso Nacional de Antropología Criminal (Report on the National Congress of Criminal Anthropology)	Report	N/D	Geneva	1896
Estudio sobre la enseñanza de la psiquiatría en Alemania (Study on the teaching of psychiatry in Germany)		N/D	N/D	N/D
Estudio sobre el "Open Door" y organización de los asilos abiertos en Escocia (Study on the "Open Door" and organization of open asylums in Scotland)		N/D	N/D	N/D
Estudios sobre los asilos abiertos en Alemania (Studies on open asylum in Germany)		N/D	N/D	N/D
Discurso inaugural de la Colonia Nacional de Alienados (Inaugural speech of the National Colony for the Alienated)	Speech	N/D	Buenos Aires	1908
Asile Colonie Régional de Retardés (Regional Asylum Colony for the Mentally Disabled)		Imp. del Hospicio de las Mercedes	Buenos Aires	1908
Asilo Colonia Regional de Retardados (Regional Asylum for the Mentally Disabled)	Speech	Imp. del Hospicio de las Mercedes	Buenos Aires	1908
Asilo Colonia Regional de Alienados, Oliva, Córdoba Province (Regional Asylum for the Alienated, Oliva, Córdoba Province)	Speech	Imp. del Hospicio de las Mercedes	Buenos Aires	1908
Alcoholismo. Sus causas en la República Argentina (Alcoholism. Its causes in the Argentine Republic)	Lecture	Imp. del Hospicio de las Mercedes	Buenos Aires	1913
La enseñanza antialcohólica en la escuela (Anti-alcohol education in schools)		N/D	Buenos Aires	1913
El Instituto de Clínica de Psiquiatría de la Facultad de Ciencias Médicas de Buenos Aires (The Institute of Clinical Psychiatry of the Faculty of Medical Sciences of Buenos Aires)		Wiebeck-Turtl	Buenos Aires	1913
Nuevo Sanatorio Nacional de Tuberculosis "Santa María" (Nuevo Sanatorio Nacional de Tuberculosis "Santa María")	Speech	Imp. del Hospicio de las Mercedes	Buenos Aires	1917

^{*} N/D = No data

== Tributes ==
The Colonia Nacional de Alienados is currently named the Hospital Interzonal Psiquiátrico "Colonia Domingo Cabred" (Colonia Domingo Cabred Interzonal Psychiatric Hospital), in honor of its founder. In the city of Córdoba, there is a higher education institute that bears the physician's name. Furthermore, the railway station in Open Door bears his name in his honor.

An avenue in the town of Posadas is named after him, as he was responsible for overseeing the construction of the first regional hospital in Misiones Province. A neighborhood in the town of Temperley is named Villa Cabred in his honor, as he owned land in the area. The property bore the name that the neighborhood currently holds, and on it stood the Temperley hippodrome, which ceased operations in 1927. Following Cabred's death in 1929, the land was subdivided, an event that was repeated in 1941 and 1943; thus, the property was divided into city blocks and its settlement began under the name Villa Cabred.

== Bibliography ==
- Chichilinisky, Salomón (2005). Electroneurobiología (ed.). Aventuras pampeanas en salud mental: la dirección de la cura - y sus vueltas - en la historia de la psicología clínica, psiquiatría y psicoanálisis en la Argentina [Pampas Adventures in Mental Health: The Direction of the Cure - and its Twists - in the History of Clinical Psychology, Psychiatry and Psychoanalysis in Argentina] (PDF) (in Spanish).
