= Torres, Buenos Aires =

Torres
- Town
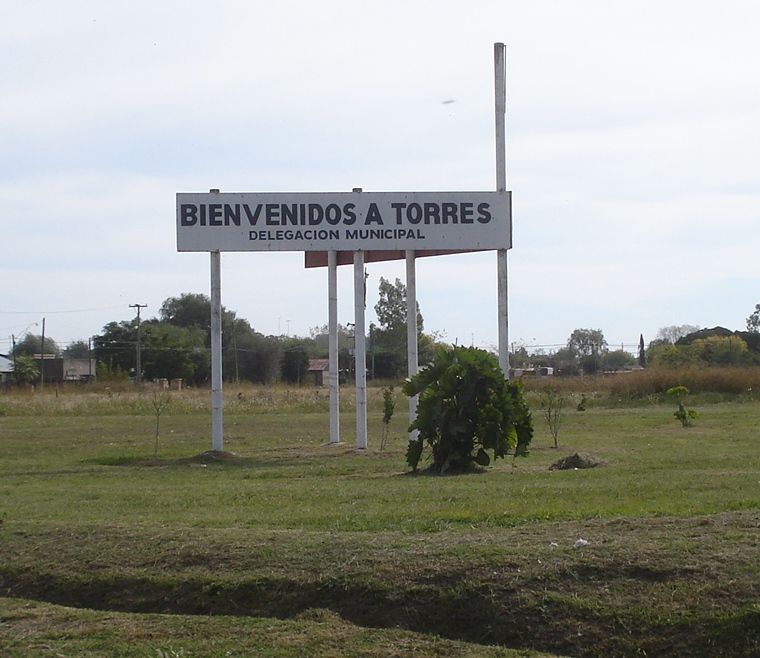
- Entrance to the town

- Location within Buenos Aires Province
- Coordinates: 34°26′S 59°08′W
- Country: Argentina
- Province: Buenos Aires
- Partidos: Luján
- Established: May 24, 1889
- Elevation: 39 m (128 ft)

Population (2001 Census)
  - Total: 1,727
- Time zone: UTC−3 (ART)
- CPA Base: B 6703
- Climate: Dfc

Torres is a town located in the Luján Partido in the province of Buenos Aires, Argentina.

== History ==
The area that would become Torres was first bought by Mechol Torres over an 18-year period starting in 1835. Rail service arrived in the town on May 24, 1889, which is considered the date of the town's founding.

== Population ==
According to INDEC, which collects population data for the country, the town had a population of 1,727 people as of the 2001 census.
