= Oliveira (surname) =

Origin
- Meaning: Olive tree
- Region of origin: Portugal, Galicia

Other names
- Variant forms: "da Oliveira", "de Oliveira", "d'Oliveira", "e Oliveira"

Oliveira is a Portuguese (and Galician) surname, used in Portuguese-speaking countries, especially former Portuguese and Spanish colonies. Its origin is from the Latin word olivarĭus , meaning 'olive tree'. In Portuguese, Oliveira may refer to 'olive tree'.

== Origin of the surname ==
The surname Oliveira derives from the word oliveira, meaning “olive tree,” and is generally understood as a toponymic surname. It was originally used to identify individuals associated with olive groves or with localities bearing the name Oliveira, a place name that occurs frequently in medieval records. Due to the widespread cultivation of olive trees, the surname appears to have arisen independently in multiple regions rather than from a single ancestral line. In medieval Iberian heraldry, the olive tree appears as a recurring motif and has traditionally been associated with peace, prosperity, and endurance, though such interpretations vary according to period and heraldic source. The presence of olive trees or branches in coats of arms bearing the name Oliveira reflects broader symbolic conventions rather than a uniform or exclusive family emblem.

Historical documentation from the Middle Ages shows significant variation in the spelling of the surname, including forms such as Olveira and Ulveira. These variations are characteristic of archaic orthography prior to the standardization of spelling and appear in administrative, legal, and ecclesiastical records. By the late 13th century, individuals bearing the surname Oliveira are recorded in royal documents from the reign of King Diniz I (r. 1279–1325). References appear in the Inquirições Gerais, a series of royal surveys commissioned to assess land tenure, jurisdictional rights, and feudal obligations. These records indicate that the surname was already well established by this period. In subsequent centuries, the surname became increasingly widespread and was later carried to overseas territories through migration and colonial expansion, contributing to its prominence in various parts of the Portuguese-speaking world.

== Toponymic ==
Oliveira derives from Latin olīva, which ultimately derives from Proto-Indo-European *hloywom. Its first documented use dates back to the 13th century, from Évora noble Pedro de Oliveira, and his son, Braga archbishop D. Martinho Pires de Oliveira. Further tracing of its origins show that it derives from ancient Roman aristrocats from the gens Oliva.

== People with the surname ==
=== General ===
- A. H. de Oliveira Marques (1933–2007), Portuguese historian
- Adriano Correia de Oliveira (1942–1982), Portuguese musician
- Alberto de Oliveira (1857–1937), Brazilian poet
- Antônio Castilho de Alcântara Machado de Oliveira (1901–1935), Brazilian writer
- Anthony Oliveira, Canadian writer
- Anthony William Garotinho Matheus de Oliveira (born 1960), Brazilian politician
- Antoniette Oliveira, Gabonese politician
- António de Oliveira Salazar (1889–1970), Portuguese statesman and long-time prime minister
- António Manuel de Oliveira Guterres (born 1949), United Nations Secretary-General, Portuguese politician and former prime minister of Portugal
- Arnaldo de Oliveira Sales (1920–2020), Hong Kong businessman
- Augusto Oliveira Moreira (1896–2009), Portuguese supercentenarian
- Carlos de Oliveira (1921–1981), Portuguese poet and novelist
- Carlos Roberto de Oliveira (1954–2023), Brazilian politician
- César de Oliveira (born 1977), Portuguese composer
- Christianne Oliveira (born 1981), Brazilian actress
- Dalva de Oliveira (1917–1972), Brazilian singer
- Daniel de Oliveira (disambiguation), several people
- Domingos Oliveira (1873–1957), Portuguese politician and general
- Elmar Oliveira (born 1950), American violinist
- Evadne D'Oliveira (1929–2010), Guyanese writer
- Fernanda Oliveira (born 1980), Brazilian ballet dancer
- Filipe Oliveira Dias (1963–2014), Portuguese architect
- Flavia de Oliveira (born 1983), Brazilian supermodel
- Flávia Oliveira (born 1969), Afro-Brazilian journalist
- Florisvaldo de Oliveira (1958–2012), Brazilian serial killer and former police officer
- Francisco Oliveira (born 1965), Brazilian entertainer and politician
- Ghaya Oliveira, Tunisian-born chef
- Hélio de Oliveira Santos (born 1950), Brazilian physician and politician
- Hélio Lourenço de Oliveira (1917–1985), Brazilian physician, and academic
- Ingrid Oliveira (born 1996), Brazilian competitive diver
- Jair Oliveira (born 1975), Brazilian composer, singer and producer
- João Baptista de Oliveira Figueiredo (1918–1999), Brazilian military leader and politician
- João Francisco de Saldanha Oliveira e Daun (1790–1876), Portuguese marshal and statesman
- João Marques de Oliveira (1853–1927), Portuguese painter
- Joaquim Pedro de Oliveira Martins (1845–1894), Portuguese writer
- José Alberto de Oliveira Anchieta (1832–1897), Portuguese explorer and naturalist
- José Carlos Oliveira (born 1965), Brazilian administrator and politician
- José Carlos de Oliveira (born 1931), Brazilian Roman Catholic bishop
- José Henrique Álamo Oliveira (1945–2025), Portuguese author
- Josefa de Oliveira (1853–1909), Portuguese actress and singer
- Juca da Oliveira (born 1935), Brazilian actor
- Juscelino Kubitschek de Oliveira (1902–1976), Brazilian politician and president of Brazil
- Lourdes de Oliveira (born 1938), Brazilian actress
- Luiz Eduardo de Oliveira (born 1944), Brazilian comics creator
- Manoel de Oliveira (1908–2015), Portuguese film director
- Manuel de Oliveira Gomes da Costa (1863–1929), Portuguese army officer and politician, former President of the Republic
- Miguel Oliveira (born 1995), Portuguese professional motorcycle racer
- Nathan Oliveira (1928–2010), American painter, printmaker, and sculptor
- Nereu de Oliveira (1888–1958), Brazilian political figure
- Nilo de Oliveira Guimarães (born 1954), São Toméan businessman and politician
- Paola Oliveira (born 1982), Brazilian actress
- Paulo Setúbal de Oliveira (1893–1937), Brazilian writer
- Plinio Corrêa de Oliveira (1908–1995), Brazilian historian and politician
- Phillippe de Oliveira (died 1627), the conqueror of Jaffna kingdom
- Raica Oliveira (born 1984), Brazilian model
- Roberto de Oliveira Campos (1917–2001), Brazilian economist and diplomat
- Rosângela Rosinha Garotinho Barros Assed Matheus de Oliveira (born 1963), Brazilian politician
- Ruy Barbosa de Oliveira (1849–1923), Brazilian writer, jurist, and politician
- Sarah Oliveira (born 1979), Brazilian radio host and television host
- Solomon de Oliveyra (c. 1633–1708), Dutch rabbi, poet, and philologist
- Tulio de Oliveira, Brazilian bioinformatician, South African permanent resident
- Tyler Oliveira (born 2000), American YouTuber and journalist
- Simone de Oliveira (1849–1923), Portuguese singer and actress
- Vanessa de Oliveira (born 1975), Brazilian author
- Vinícius de Oliveira (born 1985), Brazilian actor
- Wellington Menezes de Oliveira (1987–2011), Brazilian mass murderer
- Marina de Oliveira Sena (born 1996), Brazilian singer-songwriter

=== Footballers ===
==== Brazilian ====
- Alfredo Ramos de Oliveira (1924–2012)
- Amauri Carvalho de Oliveira (born 1980)
- Anderson Luís de Abreu Oliveira (born 1988)
- André Oliveira de Lima (born 1985)
- Antonio Ferreira de Oliveira Junior (born 1984)
- Athirson Mazzoli e Oliveira (born 1977)
- Bechara Oliveira (born 1976)
- Carlos Alberto de Oliveira Júnior (born 1978)
- Carlos Henrique de Oliveira (born 1986)
- Cícero Herbete de Oliveira Melo (born 1980)
- Clodoaldo de Oliveira (born 1974)
- Crizam César de Oliveira Filho (born 1967)
- Denílson de Oliveira Araújo (born 1977)
- Dênis Oliveira de Souza (born 1983)
- Eduardo Gonçalves de Oliveira (born 1981)
- Edvaldo Oliveira Chaves (born 1958)
- Elias de Oliveira Rosa (born 1983)
- Francismar Carioca de Oliveira (born 1984)
- Gérson de Oliveira Nunes (born 1941)
- Giovanni Silva de Oliveira (born 1972)
- Jefferson de Oliveira Galvão (born 1983)
- João Batista Nunes de Oliveira (born 1954)
- Jonas Gonçalves Oliveira (born 1984)
- José Ricardo dos Santos Oliveira (born 1984)
- José Roberto de Oliveira (born 1980)
- José Roberto Gama de Oliveira (born 1964)
- Josué Anunciato de Oliveira (born 1979)
- Luciano Siqueira de Oliveira (born 1975)
- Luis Oliveira (born 1969)
- Luiz Alberto da Silva Oliveira (born 1977)
- Luíz Mesquita de Oliveira (1911–1983)
- Marcelo Gonçalves de Oliveira (born 1971)
- Marco Aurélio de Oliveira (born 1972)
- Marcos Barbosa Oliveira (born 1976)
- Marcos Rogério Oliveira Duarte (born 1985)
- Malcom Filipe Silva de Oliveira (born 1997)
- Nélson Oliveira (born 1991)
- Paulo Rafael de Oliveira Ramos (1985–2009)
- Paulo Sérgio de Oliveira Lima (born 1954)
- Pedro Paulo de Oliveira (born 1977)
- Peres De Oliveira (born 1974)
- Raí Souza Vieira de Oliveira (born 1965)
- Reinaldo da Cruz Oliveira (born 1979)
- Rogério Oliveira da Costa (1976–2006)
- Ricardo Oliveira (born 1980)
- Roberto Firmino Barbosa de Oliveira (born 1991)
- Sócrates Brasileiro Sampaio de Souza Vieira de Oliveira (1954–2011)
- Valdo Cândido de Oliveira Filho (born 1964)
- Vinícius José Paixão de Oliveira Júnior (born 2000)
- Wellington Katzor de Oliveira (born 1981)
- Weligton Robson Pena de Oliveira (born 1979)
- Willer Souza Oliveira (born 1979)
- William Machado de Oliveira (born 1976)

==== Other nationalities ====
- Antonio "Toni" José Conceição Oliveira (born 1946), Portuguese footballer
- António Luís Alves Ribeiro Oliveira (born 1952), Portuguese footballer
- Cândido de Oliveira (1896–1958), Portuguese footballer
- Carlos Manuel de Oliveira Magalhães (born 1974), Portuguese footballer
- Carlos Paes de Oliveira (born 1978), Honduran footballer
- Domingos José Paciência Oliveira (born 1969), known as "Domingos", Portuguese footballer
- Filipe Oliveira (born 1984), Portuguese footballer
- Jorge Miguel Oliveira Ribeiro (born 1981), Portuguese footballer
- Nuno Ricardo Oliveira Ribeiro (born 1977), Portuguese footballer
- Paulo Oliveira (born 1992), Portuguese footballer
- Pedro Oliveira (born 1981), Portuguese footballer
- Raúl Oliveira (born 1972), Portuguese footballer
- Ruben Olivera (born 1983), Uruguayan footballer
- Rui Jorge de Sousa Dias Macedo de Oliveira (born 1973), Portuguese footballer

=== Other sports-related ===
- Alvimar de Oliveira Costa (born 1961), Brazilian football manager and team president
- Amanda Oliveira (born 1987), Brazilian water polo player
- António Luís Alves Ribeiro Oliveira (born 1952), Portuguese football manager and team president
- Basil D'Oliveira (1931–2011), South African-born England Test cricketer
- Brett D'Oliveira (born 1992), English cricketer
- Carmem de Oliveira (born 1965), Brazilian long-distance runner
- Charles Oliveira (born 1989), Brazilian mixed martial arts fighter, former UFC Lightweight Champion
- Damian D'Oliveira (1960–2014), South African cricketer
- Dona Oliveira (born 1960), American female bodybuilder
- Elisângela Oliveira (born 1978), Brazilian volleyball player
- Gonçalo Oliveira (born 1995), Portuguese tennis player
- João Carlos de Oliveira (1954–1999), Brazilian athlete
- Lorrane Oliveira (born 1998), Brazilian artistic gymnast
- Luís Oliveira Gonçalves (born 1960), coach of the Angola national football team
- Manuel de Oliveira (1940–2017), Portuguese long-distance runner
- Maria Cristina de Oliveira (born 1959), Brazilian chess player
- Miguel Oliveira (motorcycle racer) (born 1995), Portuguese motorcycle racer
- Oswaldo de Oliveira (born 1950), Brazilian football manager and coach
- Servílio de Oliveira (born 1948), Brazilian Olympic boxer
- Tess Oliveira (born 1987), Brazilian water polo goalkeeper
- Walewska Oliveira (born 1979), Brazilian volleyball player

=== Fictional characters ===
- Carlos Oliveira, in Resident Evil 3: Nemesis
- Silene Oliveira from Money Heist, also known as Tokyo

== See also ==
- Olivero (surname)
- Oliveros
