= Oliveros (surname) =

Oliveros is a surname.

- Agustín Oliveros (born 1998), Uruguayan professional footballer
- Auli Oliveros (born 2001), Colombian footballer
- Carlito Olivero (born 1989), American singer and actor of Puerto Rican and Mexican descent
- Chris Oliveros, founder of the publishing company Drawn and Quarterly
- Déborah Oliveros, Mexican mathematician
- Gilda Oliveros (born 1949), former American politician of the Republican Party
- Gustavo Oliveros (born 1946), Cuban fencer
- Jaylis Oliveros (born 1993), Venezuelan professional footballer
- José Oliveros (born 29 April 1948), Mexican racewalker
- Jose Francisco Oliveros (1946 – 2018), Filipino Roman Catholic prelate
- José Luis Oliveros Usabiaga (born 1983), Mexican politician affiliated with the National Action Party
- Laurina Oliveros (born 1993), Argentine footballer
- Lester Oliveros (born 1988), Venezuelan professional baseball relief pitcher
- Liliana Oliveros (born 1977), Spanish Paralympic archer
- Luz Oliveros-Belardo (1906 – 1999), Filipina pharmaceutical chemist
- Pauline Oliveros (1932–2016), American accordionist and composer
- Pilar Oliveros (born 2001), Uruguayan field hockey player
- Princesa Oliveros (born 1975), Colombian track and field athlete
- Ramiro Oliveros (1941 – 2023), Spanish film and television actor
- Sebastián Oliveros (born 1987), Colombian football manager

== See also ==
- Oliveros (disambiguation)
- Olivera
- Olivero
