= L.C. Ringhaver =

American businessman (1910-1976)

- Born: Lambert Christian Ringhaver; November 18, 1910; Cleveland, Ohio, U.S.
- Died: April 11, 1976 (aged 65); Jacksonville, Florida, U.S.
- Burial place: Evergreen Cemetery in St. Augustine J
- Spouse: Elaine Smith (m. 1947)
- Children: 2

Lambert Christian Ringhaver (1910–1976) was an American businessman and philanthropist who founded Ring Power Corporation in St. Augustine, Florida.

== Early life ==
L.C. Ringhaver was born in Cleveland, Ohio and attended Cleveland schools. According to the 1920 US Census, his father and mother were born in Holland, immigrated in 1906, and became naturalized citizens in 1913. His father was Gerrit Ringhaver, born in 1884, and worked as a machinist. His mother was Wilhelmina Ringhaver, born in 1885.

In the 1930 US Census, his father's occupation was toolmaker and he had married Wilhelmina in 1906. L.C. was 19 and working as an office clerk for a wholesale meat company.

The 1940 US Census shows that his father had modified his name to George and was working as a lathe operator for a motor manufacturer, and his younger brother Christian was working as a salesman for a Steel Company. L.C. was no longer living at home and his mother had died early in 1940.

Not much more is known about his life in Ohio other than he met and married his wife Elaine D. Smith in that state before moving down to Florida in 1947.

== Career ==
L.C. Ringhaver left Cleveland, Ohio for St. Augustine in 1947 at the age of 36. He was employed by Diesel Engine Sales Co. (DESCO) to boost production of shrimp boats. In 1952 DESCO was the largest builder of shrimp trawlers in the world. For transforming the shipyard into a success, President John F. Kennedy awarded Ringhaver the "E Award" for excellence and he was made general manager of the company. The shrimp boats were powered with Caterpillar engines, and in 1957, Ringhaver became the sole owner of DESCO. He was named an official engine dealer for Caterpillar and then in 1961 founded the Ring Power Corporation in St. Augustine, Florida. Throughout the 1960s Ringhaver was a director of the Atlantic National Bank, the St. Augustine National Bank, the Florida Forestry Association, the Florida Waterways Association, the Seafarer Magazine, Florida Ports and Trade Council, the Florida Chamber of Commerce and the Gator Bowl Association.

Ringhaver died in 1976 while hospitalized for heart problems. His oldest son Lance became the president of Ring Power, and applied to Caterpillar for their Central Florida franchise. In 1986, the younger son Randy took over as president when Lance was approved for that franchise. Lance moved to Tampa and formed the Ringhaver Equipment Company. When Lance retired at the end of 2003, Ringhaver Equipment Company and Ring Power Corporation merged. Ring Power today has twenty-six sales locations.

== Family life and legacy ==
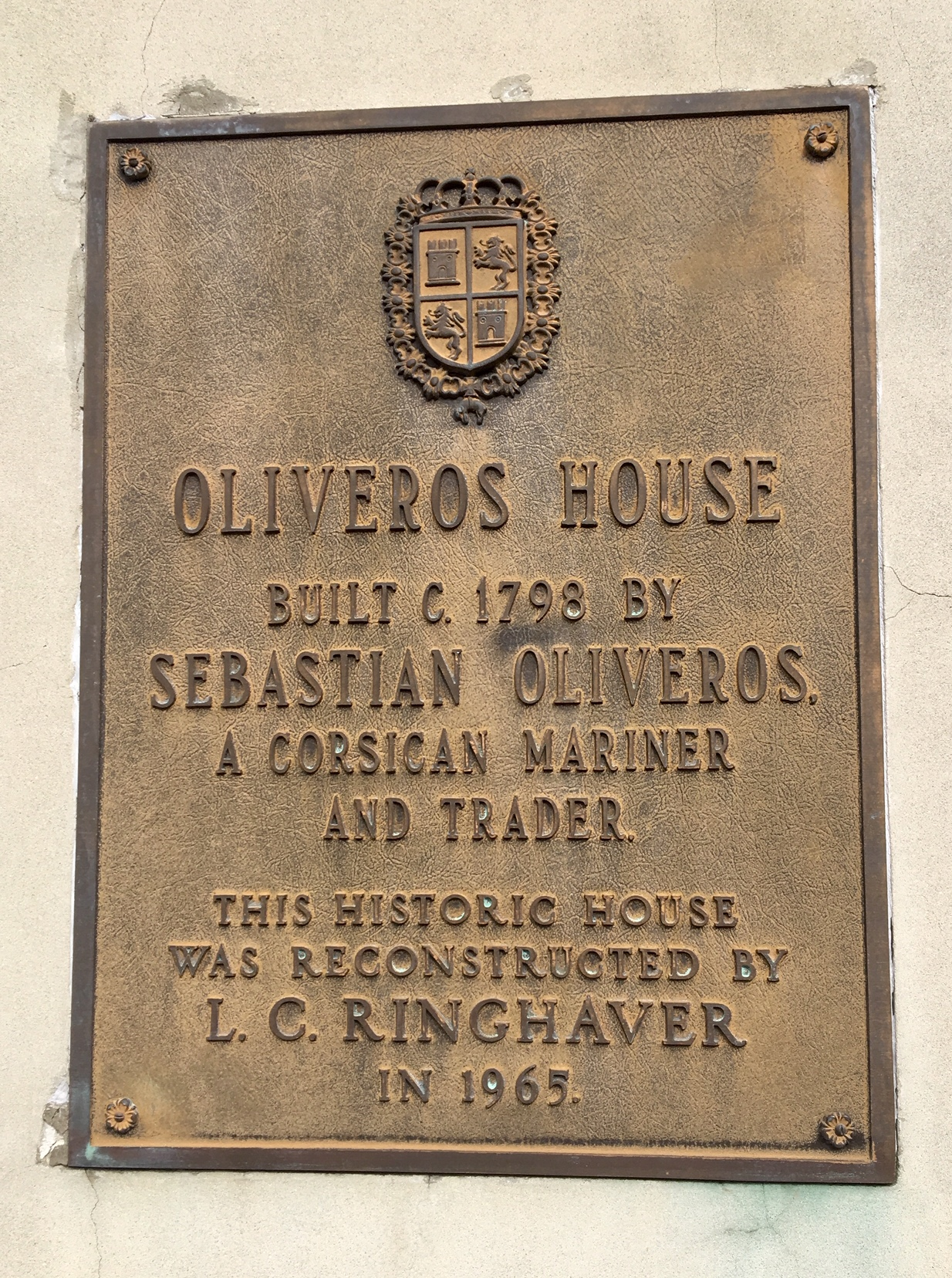
Oliveros House plaque

L. C. Ringhaver married Elaine Smith while still living in Ohio. He and Elaine had two sons together, Lance and Randy, who both followed their father into his business. After Ringhaver died, Elaine remarried to Brigadier General Charles Riggle and became Elaine Ringhaver Riggle. Randy Ringhaver, her son and executive committee member of the Board of Trustees at Flagler College, created the Elaine Ringhaver Riggle Women's Golf Scholarship at the college in her honor.

The Ringhaver Student Center at Flagler College is named after L.C. Ringhaver. Ringhaver served on Flagler's Board of Trustees from 1969 to 1976. Ring Power also established the L.C. Ringhaver Scholarship in his name once he had died.

L.C. Ringhaver was a member of the St. Augustine Historical Restoration and Preservation Commission (which later became the Historic St. Augustine Preservation Board) from 1965 to 1969. He donated the money to restore the Oliveros House in 1965 and leased the house to the commission for the sum of $1 per year. There is a plaque outside the house honoring his philanthropy. The property was in turn sub-leased to Jose R. Casallas who opened a cigar factory and retail store on the premises.

Ringhaver Park in Jacksonville, Florida is also named for Ringhaver. His family made memorial donations for the park's initial development. Ringhaver had served as a trustee of Jacksonville University and as president of the Greater Jacksonville Open for two terms. The park has expanded to 576 acres.

Ringhaver's oldest son Lance died following an automobile accident in 2016 at the age of 76.
