= Ring Power =

US corporation

Ring Power Corporation
- Type: Private
- Industry: Heavy equipment
- Founded: 1961
- Founder: L.C. Ringhaver
- Headquarters: St. Augustine, Florida, USA
- Number of locations: 26 (2019)
- Area served: 44 counties in North Florida and Central Florida
- Key people: Randal L. Ringhaver, Chairman & President; Ron Roy, CFO
- Products: Sale/Lease/Rent of New & Used Equipment, Parts, Service, Training
- Revenue: $1.2 Billion (2006)
- Number of employees: 2,300 (2008) 1,600 (2010)
- Website: ringpower.com

Ring Power is a privately held heavy equipment corporation headquartered at the World Commerce Center in St. Johns County, Florida, midway between St. Augustine and Jacksonville.

== History ==
The company was founded in 1961 by L.C. "Ring" Ringhaver, who gave up shrimp boat building to become a Caterpillar engine dealer in St. Augustine, Florida. The following year, they became a full line dealer and relocated to Jacksonville with the North Florida Caterpillar territory. In 1973 the company moved to a 38-acre (150,000 m^{2}) site on U.S. Route 1 (locally known as Philips Highway) and Baymeadows Road on the southside.

L.C. Ringhaver had two sons, Lance and Randy who worked in the business. When L.C. died in 1976, the sons took over the business. In 1986, the younger son Randy became company president. The older son Lance moved to Tampa and founded the Ringhaver Equipment Company, the Caterpillar dealer for Central Florida.

On January 1, 2004 Lance announced his retirement, and Ringhaver Equipment Company and Ring Power Corporation merged.

As the business grew, product lines expanded and more divisions were added. The property in Jacksonville eventually became a complex of seven buildings with 250,000 ft² of space. At the end of the century, they ran out of room to expand, and the character of Philips Highway had changed from industrial to commercial. The decision was made to find a new home with at least 100 acres (0.40 km^{2}). The result of the search was the purchase of 100 acres (0.40 km^{2}) at World Commerce Center along Interstate 95 in St. Johns County. A $1.6 million incentive package was approved by the St. Johns County Commission and Elkins Constructors began work in the Fall of 2003 on a 414,000 ft² facility. Most of their old property along Philips Highway was sold for redevelopment and Ring Power moved to their new headquarters in March, 2005. Lowe's purchased 16 acres (65,000 m^{2}) and built a home improvement store; BJ's Wholesale Club was constructed on an 18-acre (73,000 m^{2}) parcel; a small retail strip center with half a dozen businesses was positioned closest to the intersection of Philips and Baymeadows. Ring Power retained the 4 acres (16,000 m^{2}) at the north end of the property for a Ring Power Forklift Operations center.

Lance Ringhaver died following an automobile accident in 2016 at the age of 76.

Corporate Headquarters beside Interstate 95

== Locations ==
Ring Power today has twenty-six sales locations.

The port facilities in Jacksonville and Miami allow the company to export equipment almost anywhere in the world. Ring Power has over 1600 employees at branches in 19 cities throughout Florida and offices in California, Georgia, New Jersey, North Carolina, Rhode Island, South Carolina and Texas. Customers can purchase, lease or rent new & used Caterpillar industrial equipment. Ring Power also handles machines made by Kalmar, Linde, Clark, Trail King, Manitowoc, Grove, Gradall, National Crane, Rosco, Gomaco, Phoenix Products and others.

Over 300 employees were assigned to the Ring Power office in Riverview, Florida (near Tampa) in 2006. The operation had outgrown the spartan building constructed in the mid-1980s and needed more space. Instead of razing the structure and building new, they spent nearly $50 million to renovate and created larger offices and common areas, more windows with pleasant views of the landscape, and eliminated scores of the filing cabinets by going paperless.

== Divisions ==
- Heavy Equipment Division
- Power Systems Division
- Lift Truck Division
- Compressed Air Division
- Ports Division
- New Parts Division
- Used Parts Division
- Service Division
- Government Division
- Tactical Solutions Division
- Agricultural Division
- Cat Rental Store
- Marine Service Center
- Export Sales Division
- Truck Centers

- Ring Power Crane - New and used cranes for large projects from six manufacturers.
- Entertainment Services - Ring Power can assist with special events such as movie and video filming, corporate events & concerts or parties & shows with an inventory of power equipment including generators, UPS and power distribution; HVAC & lighting; ramps & matting.
- Phoenix Products - manufactures fuel storage tanks, generator enclosures and fuel storage systems, and offers petroleum-recycling services.

== Industries ==
Ring Power supplies equipment used in heavy construction, roadbuilding, logging, agriculture, recycling, waste management and landfill maintenance, governmental, marine power, truck engine power, prime and standby power generation, entertainment venues, industrial power, warehousing, port container handling and material handling.

== Current status ==
The Late-2000s recession caused the construction industry to largely stagnate, and the company subsequently reduced its workforce from 2,300 to 1,600. Ring Power obtained a government contract to refurbish military vehicles, but business from regular customers was slow. Now, on the back end of another decade Ring Power has been picking up steam again. They have begun to hire "new to the industry" and "talented veterans of the industry" employees. They have also started many 'training program' positions for salesmen, technicians, and management.

== Philanthropy ==
Ringhaver Park in Jacksonville consists of 576 acres of mostly wetlands. It has 6 soccer fields, 4 softball fields, 2 tennis courts and bleachers & benches; 3 covered picnic shelters with 18 picnic tables; a two-mile (3.2 km) paved trail to a dock for canoe/kayak launching on the Ortega River. It was named for founder Lambert C. Ringhaver, whose family donated funds for park development after his death in 1976.

The $11.6 million, 44,000 ft2 Ringhaver Student Center at Flagler College opened for the 2007-2008 school year. It was built using funds donated by the Ringhaver family.
