= Open Door, Buenos Aires =

Open Door
- Location in Argentina
- Coordinates: 34°00′S 59°04′W
- Country: Argentina
- Province: Buenos Aires
- Partido: Luján
- Elevation: 27 m (89 ft)

Population (2001 census [INDEC])
  - Total: 5,014
- CPA Base: B 6708
- Area code: +54 2323

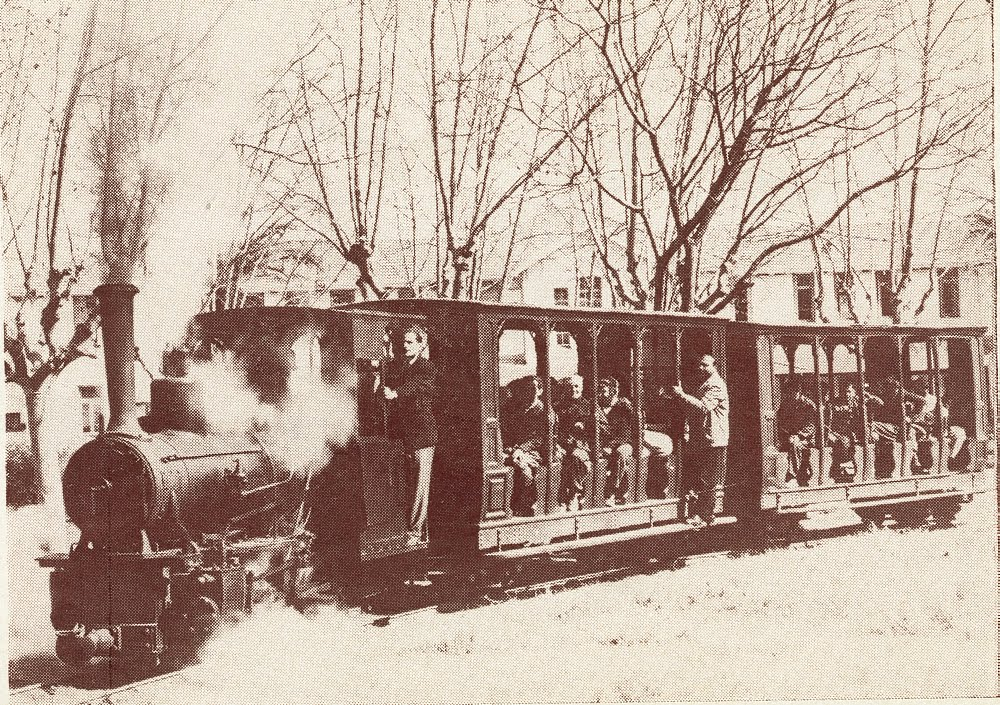
Narrow gauge railway of Doctor Domingo Cabred's hospital, 1914

Open Door is a small town in Luján Partido, Buenos Aires Province, Argentina.

== History ==
The settlement was founded in the early 20th century, and like many other settlements in Argentina the original nucleus of the settlement was a railway station. The settlement was originally called "Colonia Nacional Psiquiátrica Domingo Cabred", but the name was changed to Open Door, based upon Domingo Cabred's "open door" policy with regard to the treatment of the mentally ill.

== See also ==
- Domingo Cabred
