= Olvera (disambiguation) =

Olvera is a city in the province of Cádiz, Spain.

Olvera may also refer to:

- Olvera Street, a street in Los Angeles, California, United States

== People with the surname ==
- Agustin Olvera (1818–1876), Mexican judge and administrator in Mexican California
- José Antonio Olvera (born 1986), Mexican football player
- Miguel Olvera (born 1939), Ecuadoran tennis player and coach
- Osmar Olvera (born 2004), Mexican diver

== See also ==
- Olivera, a surname
