= World Commerce Center =

World Commerce Center (WCC) is an approved Development of Regional Impact (DRI) under Section 380.06 of the Florida Statutes. It is intended to be the commercial and office development center for St. Johns County, Florida, one of the fastest-growing counties in the United States during the 2000s.

== History ==
The World Golf Hall of Fame opened on May 19, 1998, inside the World Golf Village. It was intended as a golf Mecca for players and fans of the game. A new interchange on Interstate 95 in Florida was constructed to permit direct access to the site. On December 10, 2002, the St. Johns County Commission approved the World Commerce Center DRI which included a location for Ring Power, the first tenant. The mixed use development consists of 966 acres (391 ha), located south of the World Golf Village.

== Tenants ==
Ring Power, a heavy equipment company previously located in Jacksonville, Florida, built a new 414,000 sq ft (38,500 m^{2}) facility on 95 acres (38 ha) in the WCC and moved there in March, 2005. Their center includes a four-floor corporate headquarters building facing I-95 and separate shop units. A. 64,000 sq ft warehouse expansion is under construction.

The Rulon Company announced in May, 2005 that they would construct a new corporate office and manufacturing facility at WCC, then relocate from their present Brunswick, Georgia location. The company manufactures high end acoustical ceiling and wall systems using wood and plastic for commercial customers.

The Sevilla residential development is a deed restricted community of 405 homesites in the center of the WCC. Construction began in 2005 with phase 1, which sold briskly. By the time phase 2 opened, the 2008 economic meltdown had occurred, and sales were slow. As of December 2013 Sevilla was completely built out. Construction of the $26 million, 120-bed Clyde E. Lassen State Nursing Home for Veterans was completed in June, 2010. The United States Department of Veterans Affairs allocated $10 million for the project, with the Florida Department of Veterans Affairs contributing $16 million. The 15.7-acre (6.4 ha) site was donated by the Steinemann Company, developers of the World Commerce Center. The State of Florida operates five other nursing homes for veterans. A Gate Gas Station and Convenience Store at International Golf Parkway and World Commerce Drive opened in July 2015. A Burger King opened in January 2017. Segovia at World Commerce Center is a townhouse development on the West side of WCC. As of March 2018 all 220 homes were constructed and occupied. Flagler Hospital has constructed a 20,000 sq ft acute care center with a 25,000 sq ft YMCA 1 mile south of WCC.

Tocoi Creek High School was opened across from the northern border of the district in August 2021.

Buc-ee's a Texas based chain constructed a 53,000 sq ft convenience store with 104 fueling stations in the northeast corner of the district. It opened in February 2021.

A 157,000 sq ft Costco Wholesale Warehouse opened August 3, 2022

A Home Depot store is under construction along International Golf Parkway between World Commerce Parkway. A Bass Pro Shoppes is under construction along World Commerce Parkway. A Fields Automotive Porsche and Lexus dealership is under construction along World Commerce Parkway.

Parkway Village a shopping center is in the southwest corner of the district. Tenants include Publix, Chase Bank, Starbucks, Panera Bread, Heartland Dental, Baptist Health, Gate Express Carwash, 7-11, The Loop Restaurant and WhataBurger.

A 280 unit apartment complex Carmellia World Commerce is located behind the Publix.

Assisted Living at the Greens a 62,700 SF Assisted Living Facility and a 24,400 SF Memory Care Facility opened in 2023.

IGP/95 Logistics Park a 509,900 sq ft light industrial park is under construction along International Golf Parkway.
