= Red de Expresos Regionales =

Planned mass transit system in Buenos Aires

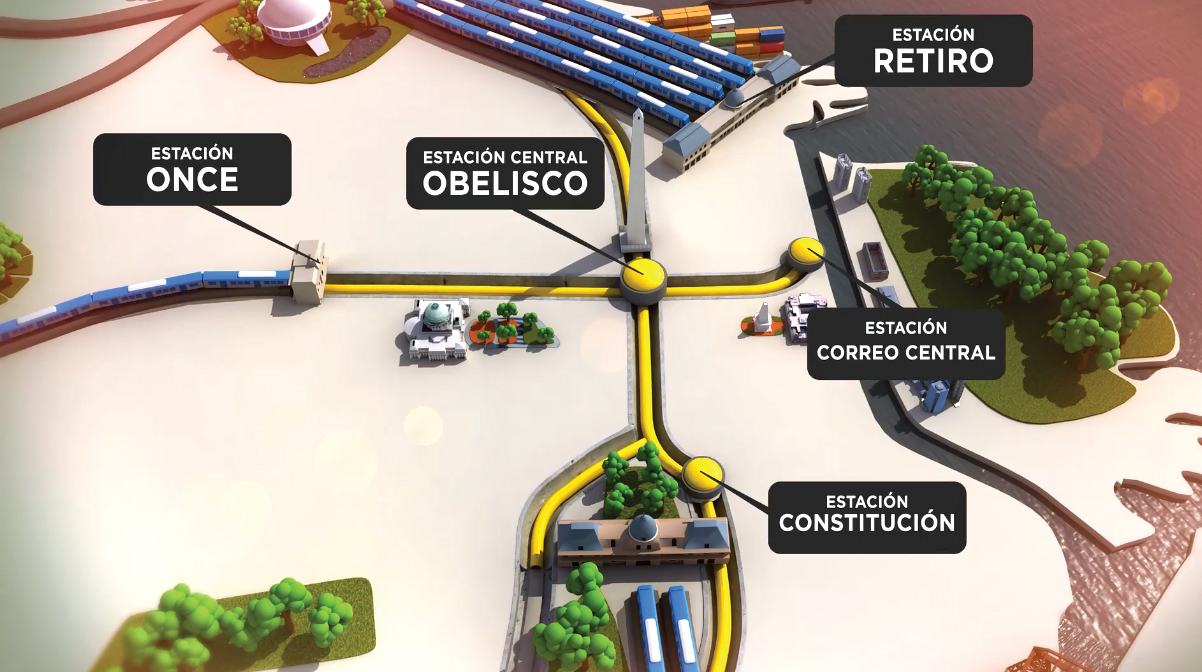
- Tunnels connecting the main terminus in Buenos Aires, as shown on the render

Overview
- Locale: Buenos Aires
- Transit type: Rapid transit and Commuter rail
- Number of lines: 6
- Daily ridership: 3 million per day (projected)
- Website: buenosaires.gob.ar/rer

Technical
- System length: 16 km (9.9 mi) of tunnels added to existing 815 km (506 mi) network
- Track gauge: 1,676 mm (5 ft 6 in); 1,000 mm (3 ft 3 3/8 in)
System map
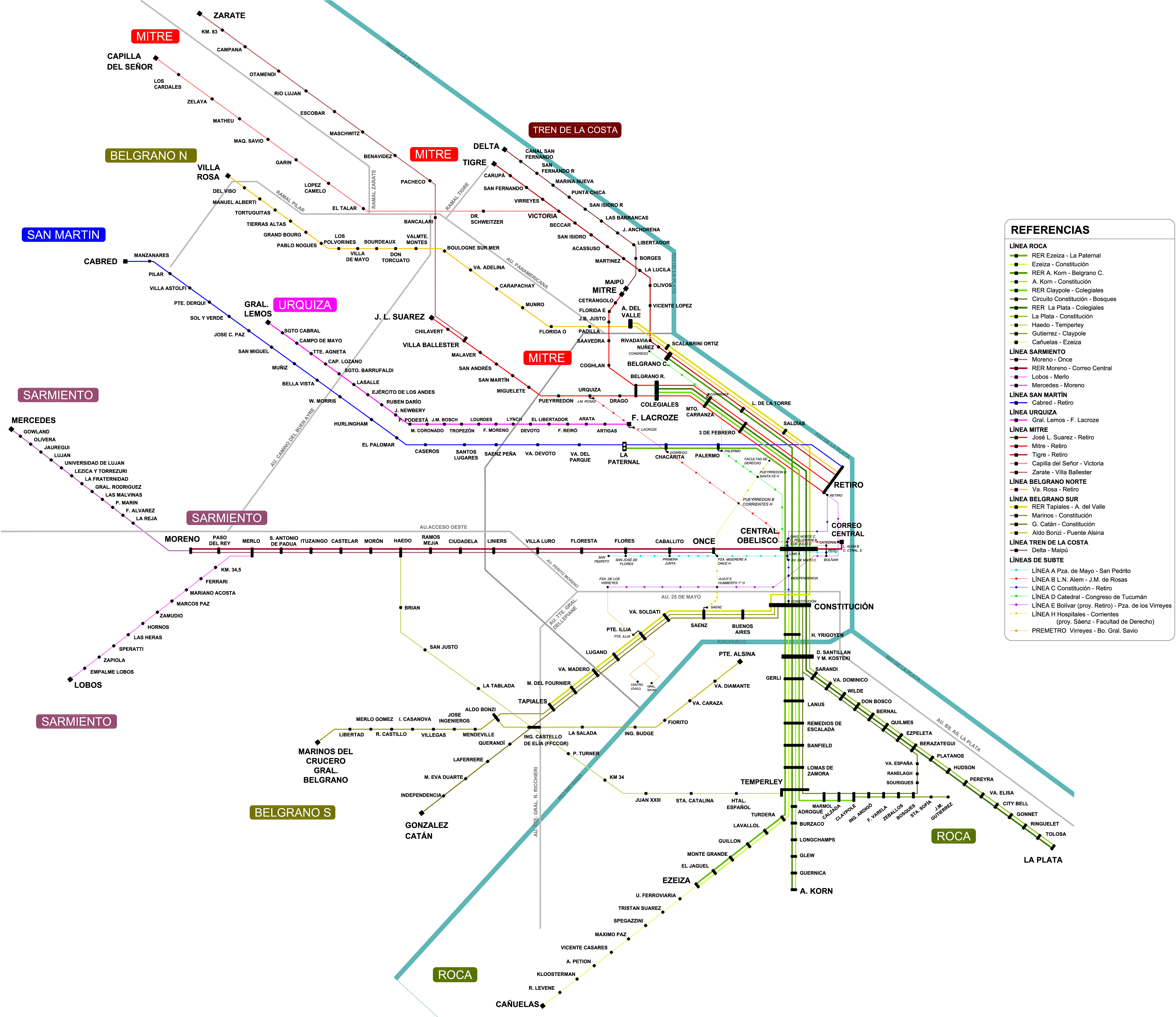
Existing commuter rail network with RER tunnels completed.

The Regional Express Network (Spanish: Red de Expresos Regionales) was a planned commuter network system in Buenos Aires, which consisted in an underground connection among the three mainline railway stations of the city: Retiro, Constitucion and Once, in the north, south and west respectively.

The project was launched by then Chief of Government of Buenos Aires Mauricio Macri in May 2015, and the first call for tender was made three years later. The RER system project was modelled on the Réseau Express Régional in Paris.

The tunnels would have had 2 new stations: the Central Station at Obelisco and the Correo Central underneath the old post office building.

At Central Station there would have been an interchange with the Underground network in the stations of Lima (A Line), Carlos Pellegrini (B Line), Diagonal Norte and Avenida de Mayo (C Line) and 9 de Julio (D Line), and the Metrobus BRT network.

At Correo Central it would be possible to interchange with two stations: Leandro N. Alem on B Line and Correo Central on E Line.

These tunnels were planned to reconnect the network, disconnected since 1897 with the closure after a fire of the Buenos Aires Central Station, constructed by the British company Buenos Aires Great Southern Railway few meters from Plaza de Mayo.

Despite all the announcements, the project was never carried out so it never surpassed its bidding process. After the administration led by Javier Milei suspended all the public works in Argentina, the Red de Expresos Regionales continues with no plans for its construction.

== History ==
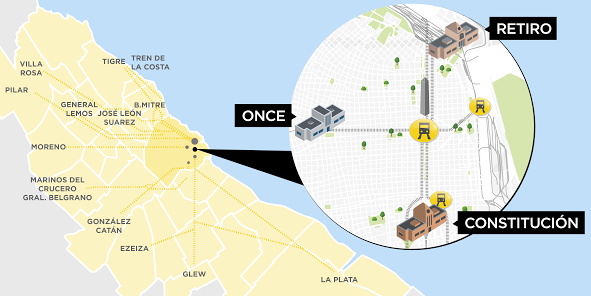
The 16km of tunnels joining the three main railway stations. The City of Buenos Aires is shown in dark orange while Greater Buenos Aires is shown in light orange.

The idea of linking the main commuter rail lines of Buenos Aires through a tunnel dates back to 1969, resulting in a 1973 study which suggested creating a Red Expresa Regional. While the original proposal sought to link the Mitre Line and Roca Line through the centre of the city, more recent proposals suggested creating tunnels between Retiro railway station, Once railway station and Constitución railway station - the three biggest rail terminals of the city.

Such a line would connect all urban and suburban commuter rail lines in the city, with the exception of the Urquiza Line which has access tunnels to Line B of the Buenos Aires Underground at Federico Lacroze railway station and the Belgrano Sur Line, whose inclusion in RER first depends on the current plans for the extension of the line to Constitución being completed.

The current RER proposal was put forward by Buenos Aires mayor Mauricio Macri in 2015. The project includes the construction of 16 km (9.9 mi) of tunnels to link the three main railway terminals and the construction of five new underground stations: one at each of the terminals, one underneath the Obelisco in the centre of the city and another in the Central Business District underneath the Buenos Aires Central Post Office.

The total cost of the project will be US$1.8 billion and will integrate the existing 815 km (506 mi) network through the tunnels. The central station will connect with the Metrobus network, as well as the Buenos Aires Underground lines,, and, while the Correo Central station will also connect with.

The first stage of the project will take four years to complete and consists of building the Obelisco station and the north–south tunnels from Retiro railway station to Constitución railway station, integrating the Mitre Line, Roca Line and San Martín Line. The second stage will take a further two years and will see the building of the east–west tunnels connecting Once railway station to the central station and the building of the Correo Central station, integrating the Sarmiento Line into the network. The final stage will take a further two years and will extend the Belgrano Sur Line to Constitución from its existing terminal using viaducts (a project already under way independently of RER) then build a new tunnel between Constitución and Retiro connecting the two metre gauge railways after they are electrified.

Perhaps the most notable omission from the project is the inclusion of the Urquiza Line whose terminal as at Federico Lacroze railway station in the West of the city. The line is distinctive from the other lines due to its standard gauge configuration since it was originally intended to be part of Line B of the Buenos Aires Underground. Urquiza Line trains without any modification could use the access tunnel at the Federico Lacroze underground station and travel through the line's tunnels to Carlos Pellegrini station which is where Line B would combine with RER regardless of the inclusion of the Urquiza line.

== Challenges ==
The main challenges to the implementation of the RER network were found in the differing track gauges and state of electrification found in the different lines in Greater Buenos Aires:

Buenos Aires Commuter Rail
Line	Length (kilometres)	Track gauge	Electrification	Annual ridership (2008)
Roca	237.2	1,676 mm (5 ft 6 in)	Yes	125,556,026
Sarmiento	184.1	1,676 mm (5 ft 6 in)	Yes	118,143,006
Mitre	185.5	1,676 mm (5 ft 6 in)	Yes	73,207,048
San Martín	56.3	1,676 mm (5 ft 6 in)	Planned	46,647,676
Belgrano Norte	54.3	1,000 mm (3 ft 3 3/8 in)	No	45,830,200
Urquiza	29.9	1,435 mm (4 ft 8 1/2 in)	Yes	24,212,133
Belgrano Sur	66.3	1,000 mm (3 ft 3 3/8 in)	Planned	11,472,416

Discounting the Urquiza Line which is not included in the project and which could easily be integrated into the Buenos Aires Underground, the problems are then found within the San Martín Line and the two Belgrano lines of the General Belgrano Railway. The San Martín Line, while sharing the same 1,676 mm (5 ft 6 in) as the majority of the network, currently uses diesel-electric CSR SDD7 rolling stock, however electrification of the line has now been planned for some time and the rolling stock would presumably be moved to other parts of the country. In 2015, the first studies on the line's electrification began, while the government announced that funding had been secured.

The Belgrano Sur and Belgrano Norte perhaps provided the biggest challenge since both had a different track gauge to the rest of the network and neither are electrified, with no immediate plans to carry out electrification at the time the RER project was announced. However, both lines are having their rolling stock replaced with electrification in mind, with the Belgrano Sur line using new CNR DMUs which have been designed to be easily converted to electric power, while the Belgrano Norte has a similar case with its new Argentine-made Emepa Alerce DMUs which are also designed to be easily converted.

Converting the gauge of the lines was out of the question, so there would have been a separate north–south tunnel between Retiro and Constitución for the two lines. Since both lines have the lower traffic than the Sarmiento, Mitre and Roca lines and given the current lack of electrification, difference in gauge and necessary extension of the Belgrano Sur line to Constitución, the connection of these two lines to the RER network will be left to the third and final stage of its construction. Conversely, those three lines are the most straight forward especially considering that they all share the same CSR rolling stock.

=== Existing tunnels and connections ===
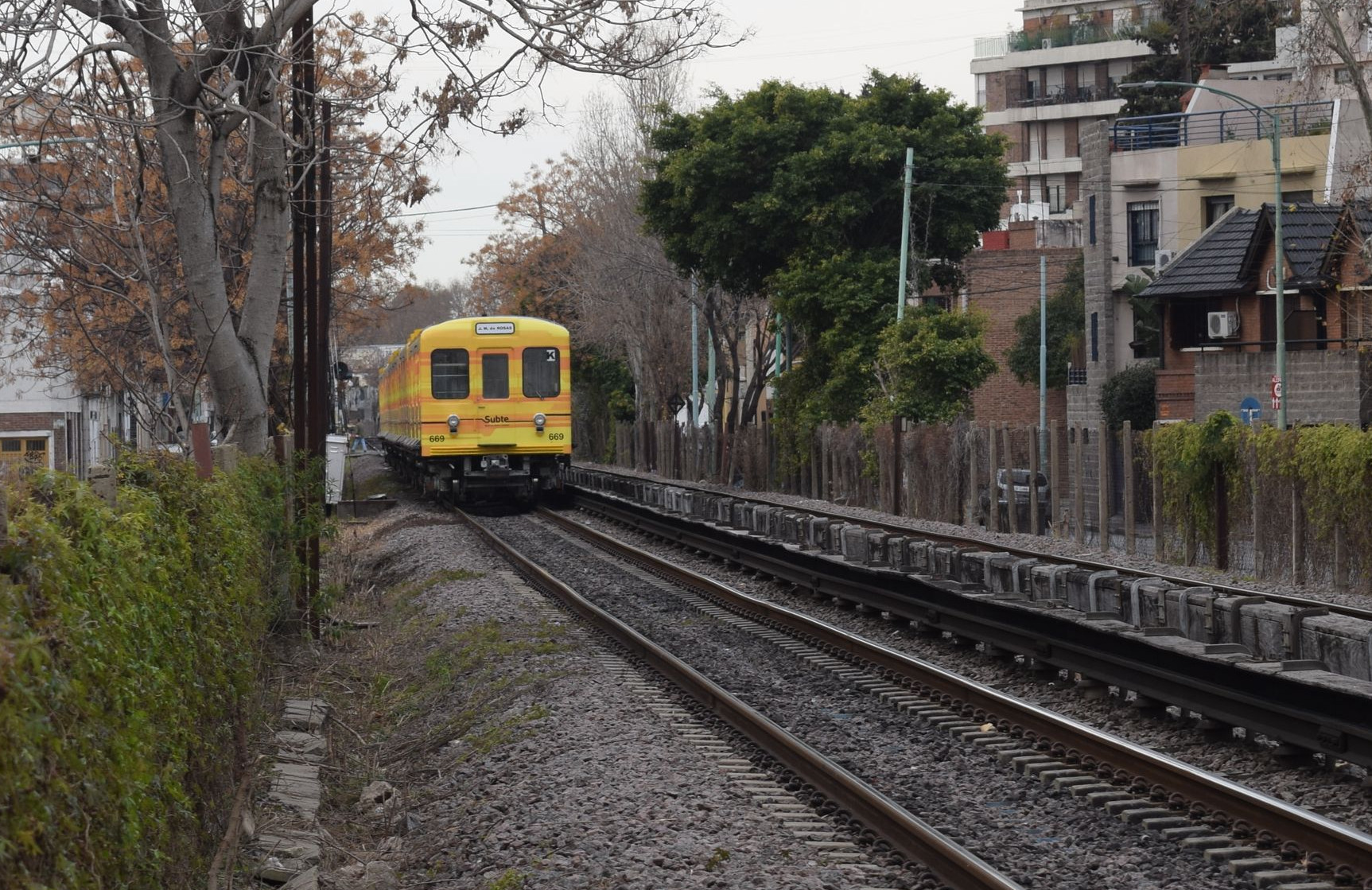
A Line B car operating above-ground on the Urquiza Line.

As noted, the Urquiza Line already has a connection to both future stations in the centre of the city through the use of Line B, though currently this connection is not made use of since services terminate at Federico Lacroze railway station and do not continue on underground.

Likewise, the Sarmiento Line and San Martín Line are connected by a one-track tunnel which runs through the city from the Sarmiento Line's terminus at Once railway station in what would be RER's trajectory to Puerto Madero, while a double-track segment connects the former Puerto Madero station with the San Martín Line's terminus at Retiro railway station. This route between the two lines has been traditionally used for freight services, though it was briefly used for passenger services to the centre of the city on the Sarmiento Line during the 1990s.

Similarly, the tracks of what was the Buenos Aires and Ensenada Port Railway and the Tranvia del Este provide a north–south connection through the Puerto Madero district, though today these areas have heavy road traffic and would be unsuitable for overground commuter rail.

== See also ==
- Rail transport in Argentina
- Buenos Aires Underground
