= José María Jáuregui, Buenos Aires =

José María Jáuregui
- Location in Argentina
- Coordinates: 34°36′S 59°10′W
- Country: Argentina
- Province: Buenos Aires
- Partido: Luján
- Elevation: 21 m (69 ft)

Population (2001 census [INDEC])
  - Total: 8,705
- CPA Base: B 6706
- Area code: +54 2323

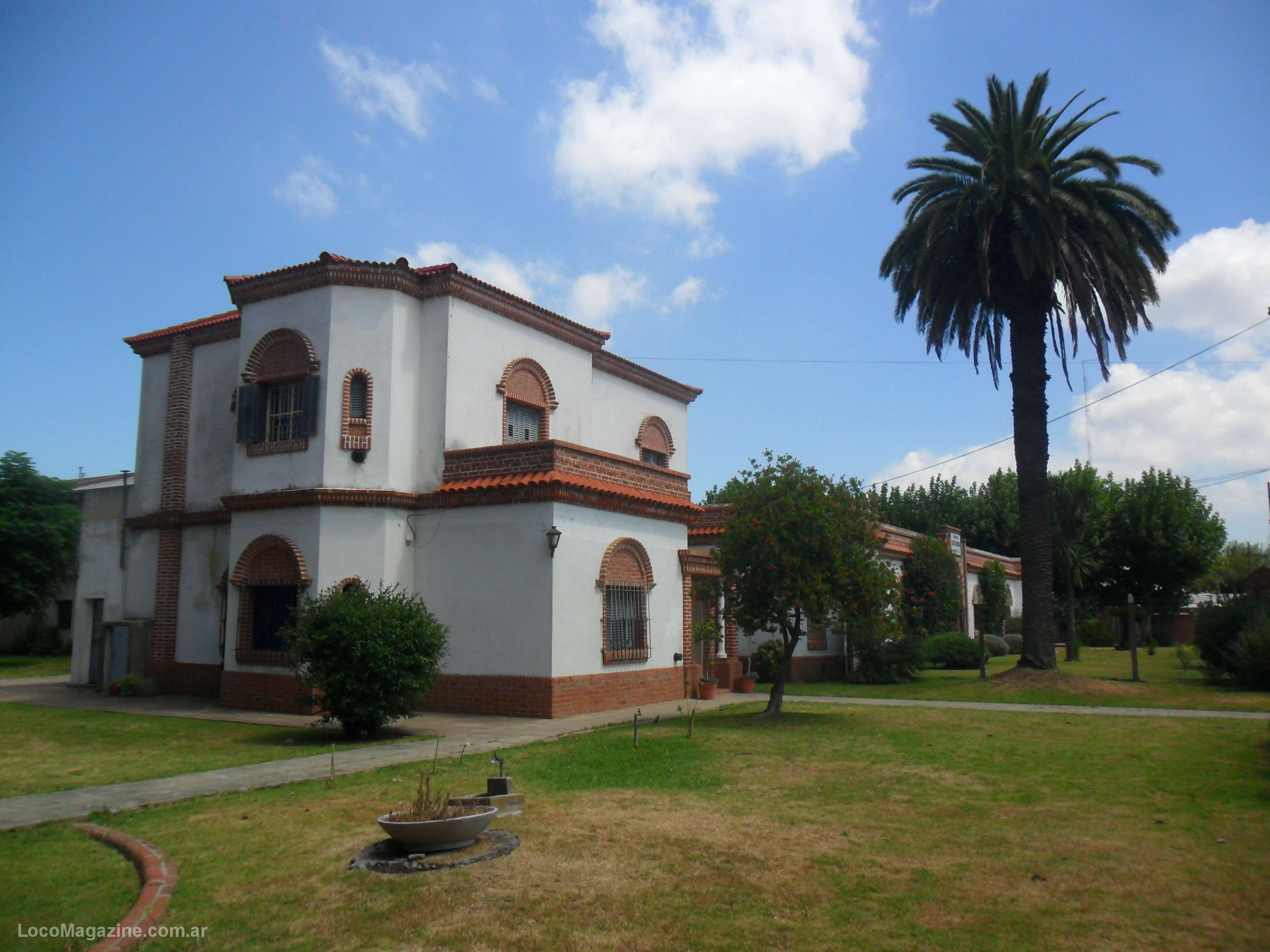
A picture of Jauregui

José María Jáuregui is a town in the Luján Partido of Buenos Aires Province, Argentina.

== See also ==
- Club Social y Deportivo Flandria
