= Oliveros House =

- U.S. Historic district – Contributing property
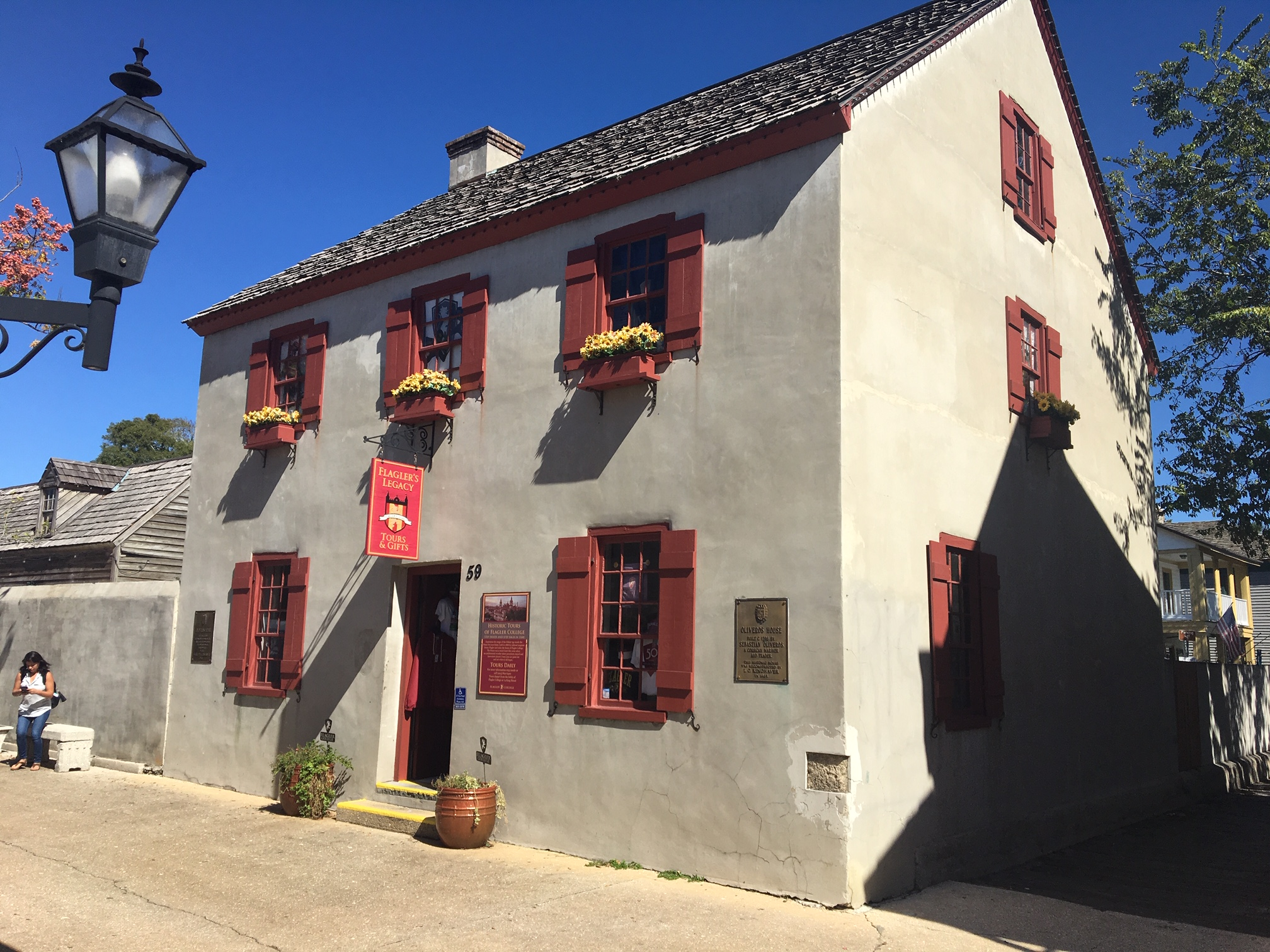
- Oliveros House, 2018

- Location within Florida
- Location: 59 St. George St; St. Augustine, Florida
- Coordinates: 29°54′54″N 81°18′44″W
- Built: 1964
- Architectural style: Spanish Colonial
- Part of: St. Augustine Town Plan Historic District (ID70000847)

The Oliveros House is located at 59 St. George Street, St. Augustine, Florida. It was built of coquina during the Second Spanish Period in Florida (1565-1763). Today it is a reconstructed building, standing on original foundations which were unearthed during archaeological excavations.

== Architecture ==
The current Oliveros House was the fourth structure to occupy the site at 59 St. George Street. The first building at the site was a wooden house, the second a tabby structure, and the third, again, a wooden house. It was a two-story house with a ground floor consisting of three rooms and a loggia area. The original flooring was apparently wooden. Archaeologists have found partial remains of a coquina and brick fireplace in the north room. The loggia contained a stairway to the second floor and bedrooms.

== Early Occupants ==
An early Spanish map indicates that a Pedro González, native of Galicia, owned the original dwelling. González was married to Isabel Rodríguez of St. Augustine in 1733. They had five children together.

In 1763, when Great Britain occupied Florida, most Spanish residents left for Havana. This house was not sold during British occupation, as evidenced by a British map that shows this property as a lot and house in the trusteeship of Jesse Fish, who was a prominent agent for the sale of Spanish property.

In 1783, one of the five González children, Juan, married Juana Montes de Oca in Havana. She was also a native of St. Augustine and later would return to Florida as a widow with five children to make a claim for and henceforth live in her father-in-law's house. The Spanish government officially returned the property to widow Juana Montes de Oca in 1784.

1788 records showed that the house was "of wood and shingles, covered with palm leaves in fair condition, the property of Juana Montes de Oca." De Oca died in 1791 and the house disappeared from records until 1798.

That same year, de Oca's daughter Maria González Montes de Oca sold the lot to Sebastian de Oliveros.

== The Oliveros Family ==
Oliveros was a sailor and native of Corsica who came to St. Augustine in 1733. According to documents of October 4, 1798, he "bought from the González Montes de Oca family their lot where he built a home for his family which consisted of a two-story coquina house." Oliveros married Catalina Usina, a local Minorcan girl, and rebuilt the house using coquina. Oliveros frequently sailed to Charleston and northern ports within the United States. He was a victim of piracy in 1804 and was lost at sea.

Eleven years after her husband's death, Usina petitioned the Spanish Crown for permission to sell the property. She moved out of the house and rented it to a Gaspar Arnau, a mariner and ship owner, who eventually purchased the property. He operated a shop and a way station in the home. Records described it as, "a continuous salon on the ground floor and another upstairs without furring."

The yard had a masonry wall. To the rear was a kitchen and the well. The Oliveros House existed until 1908.

== San Agustín Antiguo ==
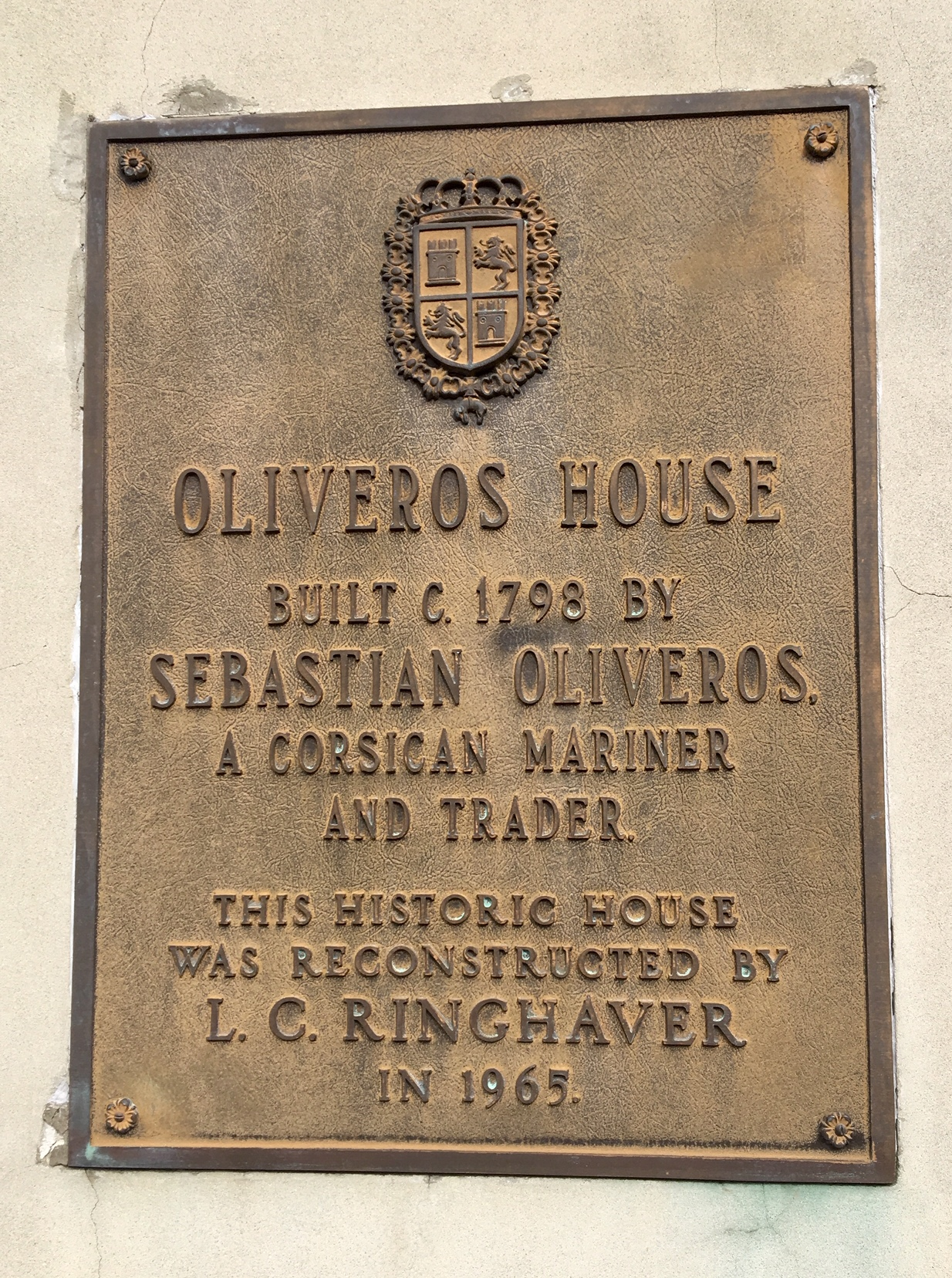
Oliveros House plaque

With generous funding from L.C. Ringhaver, the Historic St. Augustine Preservation Board and St. Augustine Restoration, Inc. restored this site in 1964 as part of its living history museum village, San Agustín Antiguo. During this time the Oliveros House was used to display Hispanic cigar-making practices.

== Present Day ==
Today at this site is the retail store Flagler's Legacy, the official spirit shop operated by and for Flagler College. Flagler's Legacy opened for business in the Oliveros House in Spring 2000. Flagler's Legacy seeks to market the College globally and is operated by College students and alumni. All profits from Flagler's Legacy are put into Flagler College general fund. The building is owned by St. Augustine Restoration, Inc.
