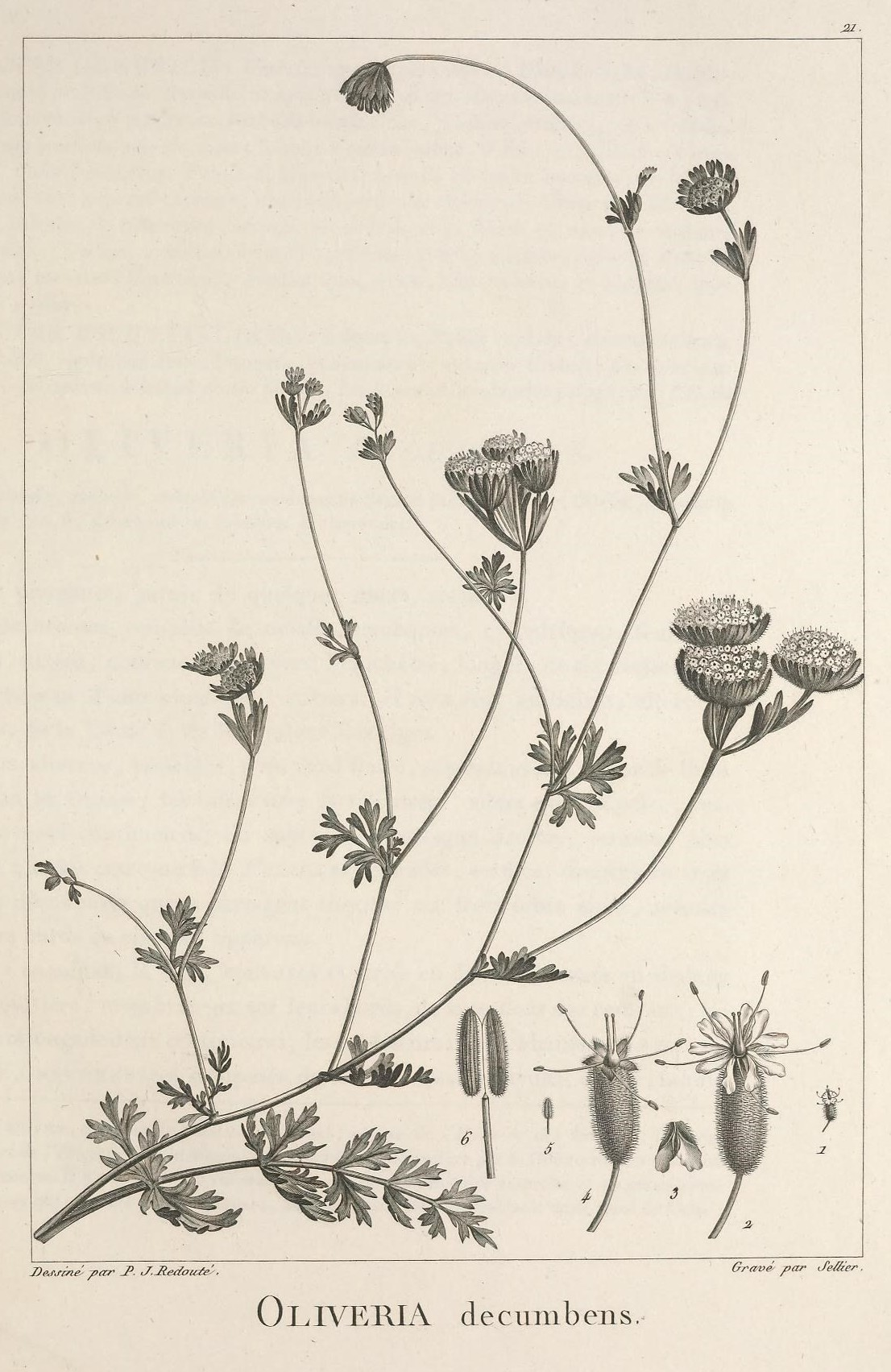

Scientific classification
- Kingdom: Plantae
- Clade: Tracheophytes
- Clade: Angiosperms
- Clade: Eudicots
- Clade: Asterids
- Order: Apiales
- Family: Apiaceae
- Genus: Oliveria; Vent.
- Species: O. decumbens

Binomial name
- Oliveria decumbens Vent.

Synonyms
- Callistroma Fenzl; Callistroma erubescens Fenzl; Carum decumbens (Vent.) Koso-Pol.; Carum orientalum (DC.) M.Hiroe; Oliveria aucheri Jaub. & Spach; Oliveria bruguieri Jaub. & Spach; Oliveria orientalis DC.

= Oliveria =

Genus of flowering plants

Oliveria is a genus of flowering plants in the family Apiaceae. It includes a single species, Oliveria decumbens, an annual native to Western Asia, which ranges from southeastern Turkey to Syria, Iraq, and western and southwestern Iran.
