= CSR SDD7 =

Argentine diesel-electric locomotive

CSR SDD7 locomotive
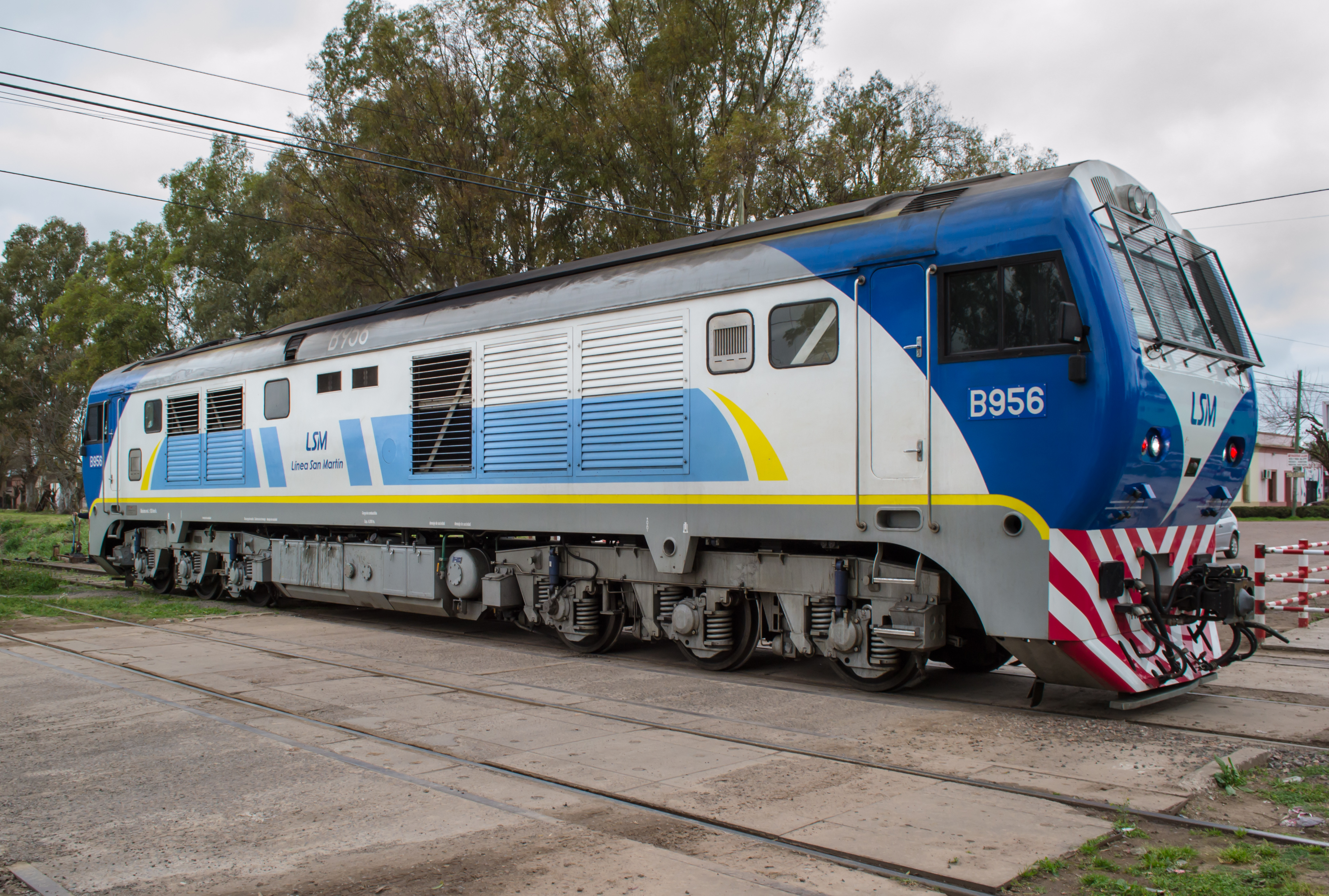
- A Trenes Argentinos CSR SDD7 on the San Martín Line
Type and origin
- Power type: Diesel-electric
- Builder: CSR Qishuyan Loco,
- Build date: 2013-
Specifications
- Configuration
  - UIC: Co'Co'
- Gauge: 1,676 mm (5 ft 6 in)
- Loco weight: 114 tonnes
- Fuel capacity: 6,000 L (1,300 imp gal)
- Sandbox cap.: 400 kg (880 lb)
- Prime mover: Caterpillar 3516B
- Engine type: Diesel
- Traction motors: ZQDR310D
- Transmission: Diesel electric
Performance figures
- Maximum speed: 120 km/h (75 mph)
- Power output: 2,249 hp (1.7 MW)
- Tractive effort
  - Starting: 320kN
  - Continuous: 200kN
Career
- Operators: Trenes Argentinos
- Locale: Buenos Aires, Argentina

The CSR SDD7 is a 2,249 hp diesel-electric locomotive manufactured by CSR Corporation Limited from 2013 onwards for use in Argentina by Trenes Argentinos, a subsidiary of Ferrocarriles Argentinos S.E. On the San Martín Line in Buenos Aires Province, 24 of these locomotives are used, making up the entire rolling stock of the commuter rail line.

== Technical specifications ==
The locomotive has one conductor's cabin on each end, connected by an internal corridor. Its total weight is 114 tonnes with a maximum weight per axle of 19 tonnes. The 3516B engine is manufactured by Caterpillar and generates 1678 kW, with the locomotive having a maximum speed of 120 km/h. Each axle has an independent traction motor, which are controlled by two microprocessors.

Each locomotive has a 6000-litre fuel capacity, carries 420 kg of lubricants, 800 litres of water and 400 kg of sand in its sandboxes.

== Usage ==
In Argentina, the locomotives are used exclusively for the San Martín Line of the General San Martín Railway. Despite there being plans for electrification, the 24 trains make up the entirety of the line's rolling stock. During the integration of this new rolling stock, the stations on the lines were also modernised and restored. As of 2015, the electrification of the line is being considered, which would mean the rolling stock would be moved elsewhere.

In 2018 Transmashholding Argentina was awarded a contract to refurbish and update the locomotives and their respective carriages.

== Gallery ==
CSR train arriving in Devoto station

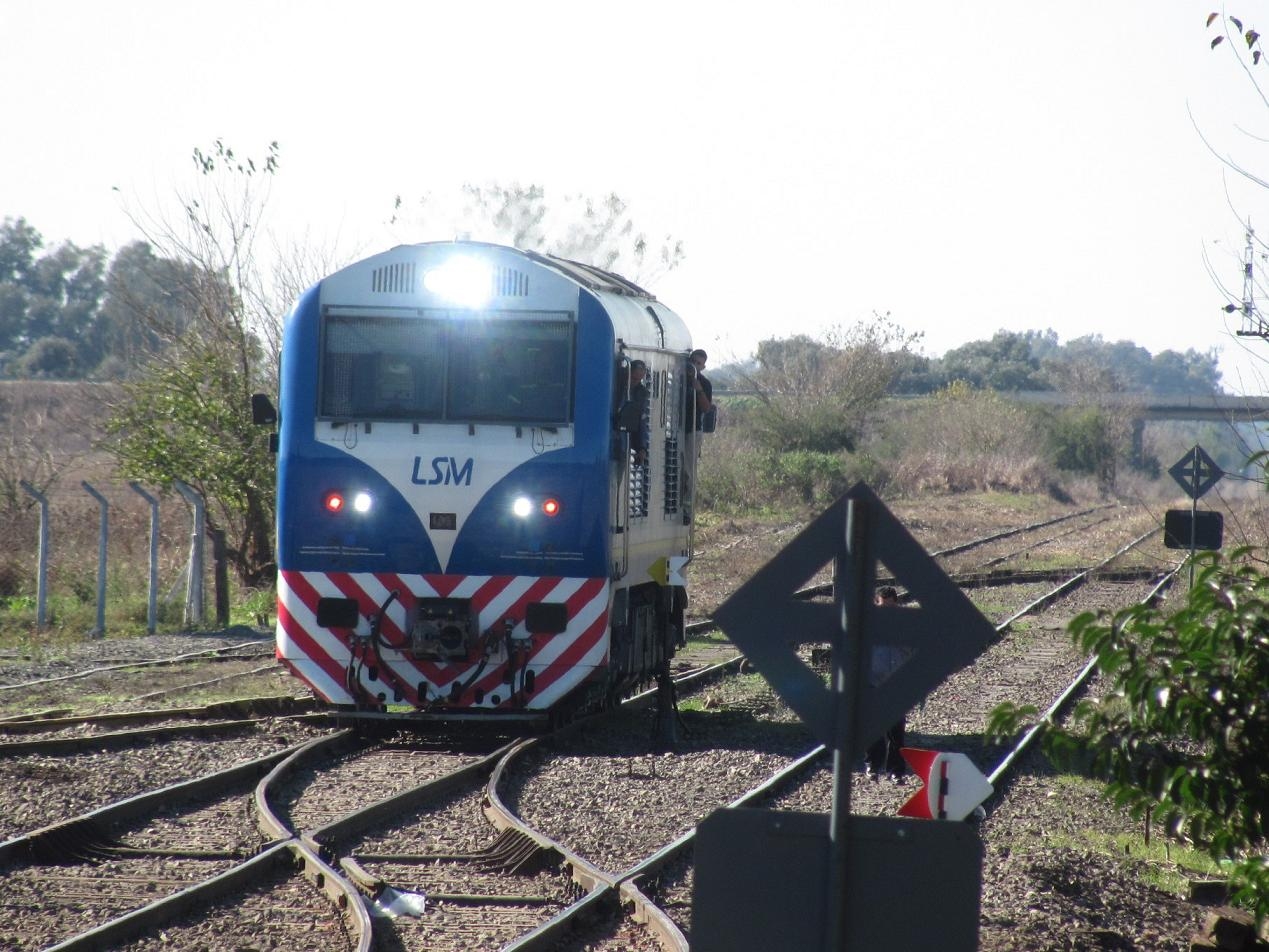
Locomotive doing maneuvers in Cabred

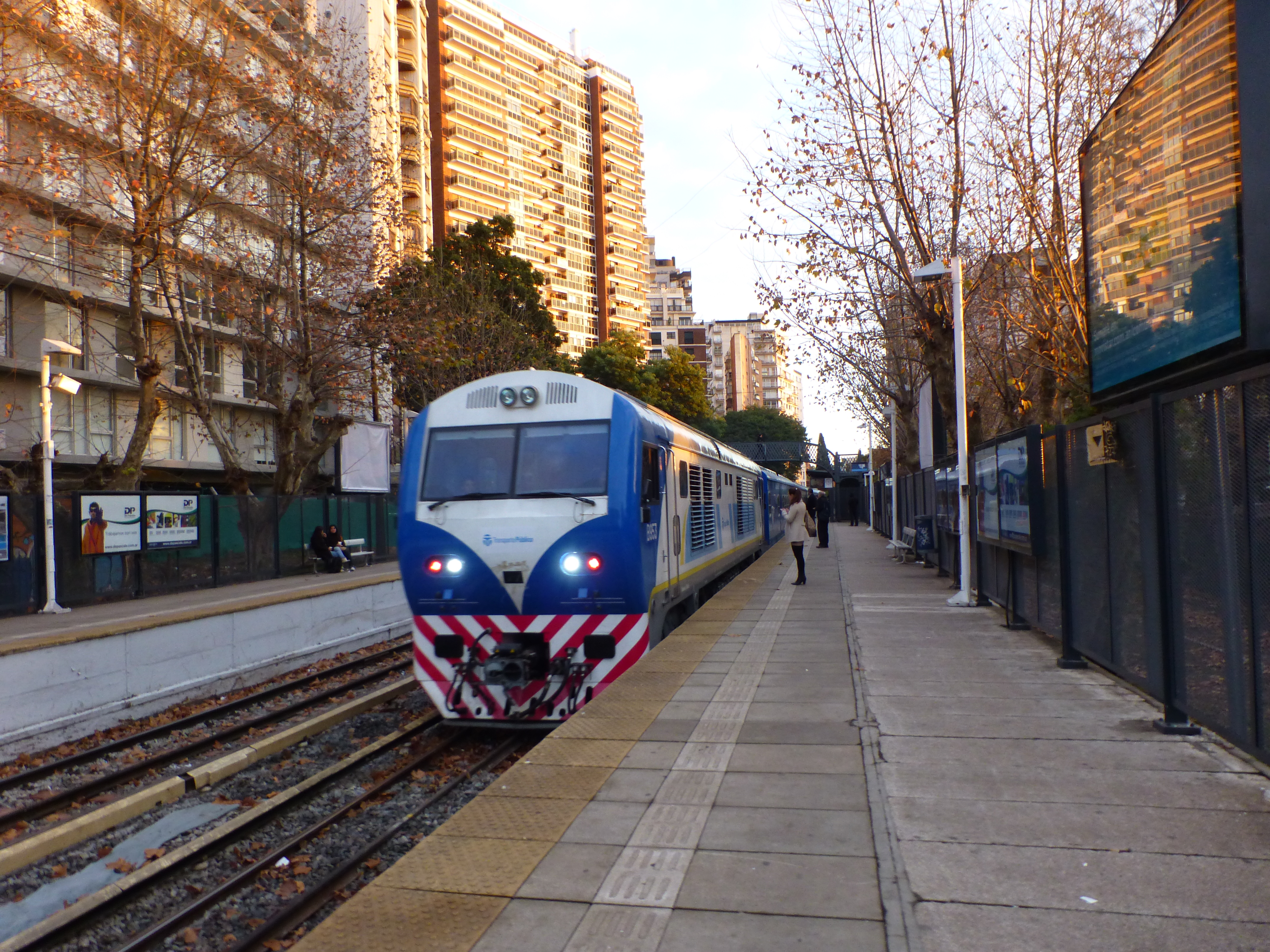
A train arriving at Olivos station

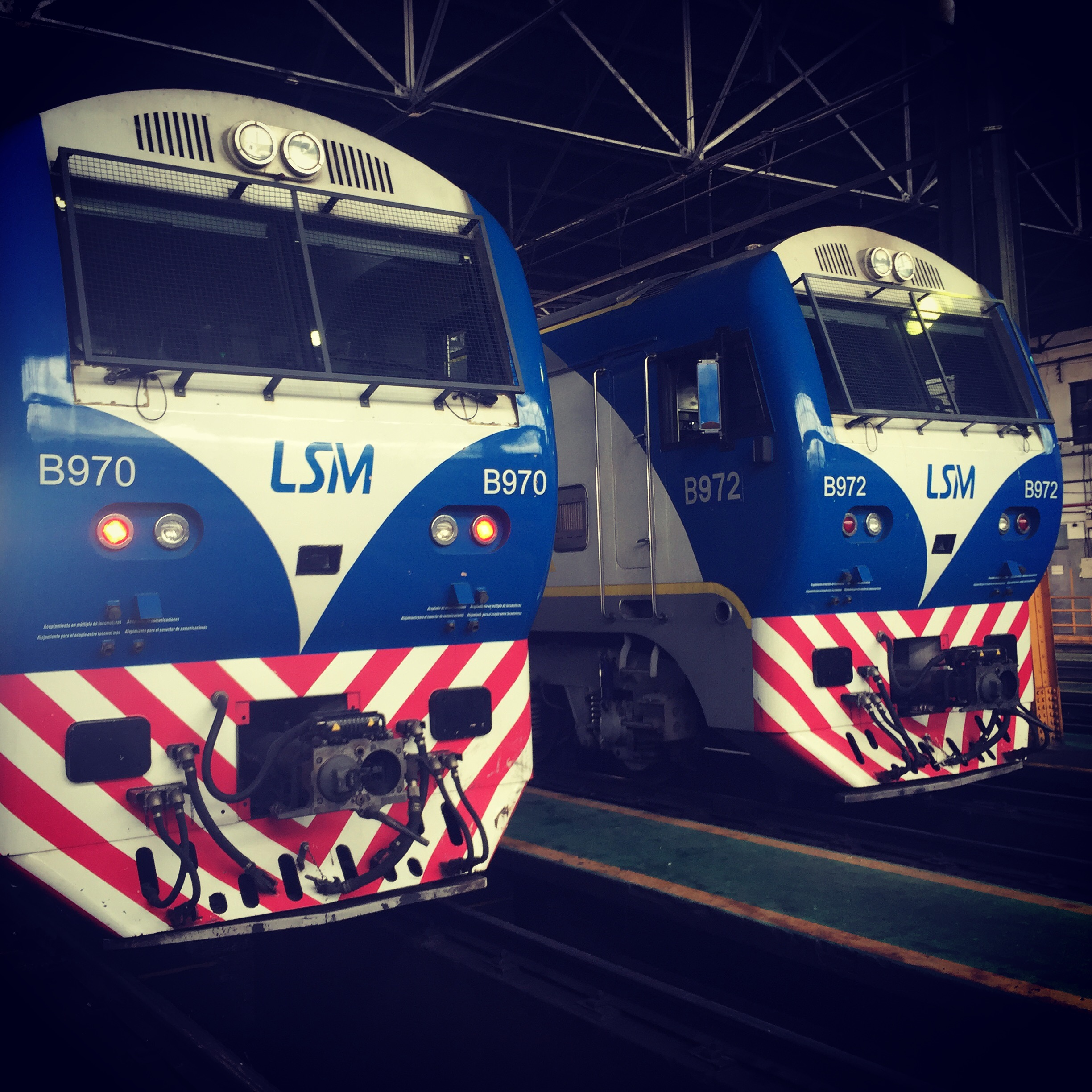
Two units in Buenos Aires

== See also ==
- CNR CKD8
- CSR EMU (Argentina)
- Trenes Argentinos
- Ferrocarriles Argentinos (2015)
