= Héctor Olivera =

Héctor Olivera may refer to:

- Héctor Olivera (film director) (born 1931), Argentine film director, producer and screenwriter
- Héctor Olivera (baseball) (born 1985), Cuban baseball player
