= Oliveira =

Oliveira may refer to:

== People ==
- Oliveira (surname)
- Oliveira (footballer, born 1981), full name Ederaldo Antonio de Oliveira, Brazilian football goalkeeper
- Oliveira (footballer, born 1985), full name Bruno Giglio de Oliveira, Brazilian football centre-back

== Places ==
=== Brazil ===
- Oliveira, Minas Gerais, a municipality in the State of Minas Gerais
- Sales Oliveira, a municipality in the State of São Paulo

=== Portugal ===
- Oliveira (Barcelos), a civil parish in the municipality of Barcelos
- Oliveira (Póvoa de Lanhoso), a civil parish in the municipality of Póvoa de Lanhoso
- Oliveira (Amarante), a civil parish in the municipality of Amarante
- Oliveira (Arcos de Valdevez), a civil parish in the municipality of Arcos de Valdevez
- Oliveira (Mesão Frio), a civil parish in the municipality of Mesão Frio
- Oliveira do Douro (Cinfães), a civil parish in the municipality of Cinfães
- Oliveira do Douro (Vila Nova de Gaia), a civil parish in the municipality of Vila Nova de Gaia
- Oliveira de Azeméis, a civil parish in the municipality of Aveiro
- Oliveira de Frades, a civil parish in the municipality of Viseu
- Oliveira do Bairro, a civil parish in the municipality of Aveiro
- Oliveira do Hospital, a civil parish in the municipality of Coimbra

== Stadiums ==
- Estádio Alberto Oliveira, multi-use stadium in Feira de Santana, Brazil
- Estádio Ary de Oliveira e Souza, multi-use stadium in Campos dos Goytacazes, Brazil
- Estádio João Hora de Oliveira, multi-use stadium in Aracaju, Brazil
- Estádio Raulino de Oliveira, a football stadium in Volta Redonda, Brazil

== Football clubs ==
- F.C. Oliveira do Hospital, Portuguese football club in Oliveira do Hospital
- Oliveira do Bairro S.C., Portuguese football club in Oliveira do Bairro

== Other uses ==
- Oliveira Elementary School, an elementary school in Fremont, California, USA
- Oliveira-Tanzi effect, an economic situation
- SuperCup Cândido de Oliveira, a football trophy
