= Ángel Roffo =

Ángel Honorio Roffo (December 30, 1882 – July 23, 1947) was an Argentine medical doctor who dedicated his medical career to the study and treatment of cancer.

Roffo was born in the city of Buenos Aires and went on to study at the University of Buenos Aires, he graduated in 1909 with the thesis A contribution to the study of Cancer.

He became chief of practical work in the department of urology at UBA, then between 1912 and 1915 he was assigned professor of Anatomical Pathology. Between 1915 and 1931 he worked as attached professor in Anatomical Pathology.

In 1912 Daniel Cranwell presented a paper called Cáncer experimental to the Argentine National Academy of Medicine which detailed the results of his experiments on laboratory animals. This work influenced the creation of an institute for the study and treatment of cancer. In 1922 it was succeeded by the Instituto de Medicina Experimental directed by Roffo. He had become the leading cancer specialist in Latin America.

During the 1920s Roffo made numerous trips to Europe, where he met a number of leading scientists. One of these was Marie Curie, with whom he discussed the utilization of radiotherapy.

Roffo was one of the first scientists to demonstrate the link between tobacco tars and the production of tumours ". By the end of the 1920s he was certain that there was a link between smoking and cancer, he went on to produce a number of papers on the subject of tobacco carcinogenesis in the 1930s. Robert N Proctor of Stanford University claimed that Roffo arguably represented the single greatest scientific threat to the tobacco industry prior to the 1950s.

Roffo received a number of awards for his contribution to science, from institutions in Argentina, Brazil, Peru, Bolivia, Venezuela, France, Spain, Portugal, Italy and Germany.

Ángel Roffo died on July 23, 1947, and the Institute of Oncology (Instituto de Oncología) at UBA was renamed in his honour.

== See also ==
- Domingo Cabred
