= Olivera, Buenos Aires =

Olivera
- Town
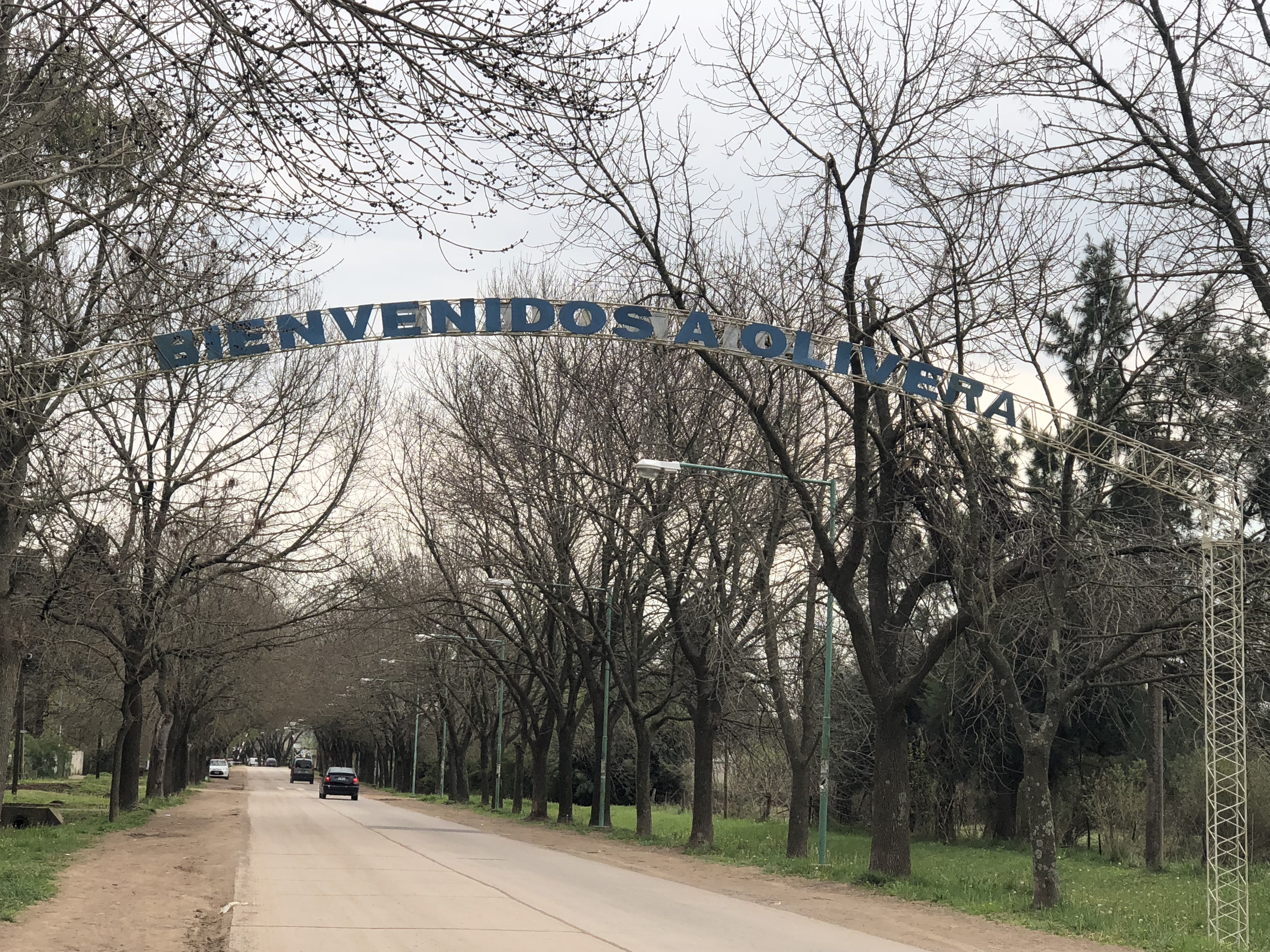
- Entrance to the town

- Location within Buenos Aires Province
- Coordinates: 34°38′S 59°15′W
- Country: Argentina
- Province: Buenos Aires
- Partidos: Luján
- Elevation: 29 m (95 ft)

Population (2001 Census)
  - Total: 1,538
- Time zone: UTC−3 (ART)
- CPA Base: B 6608
- Climate: Dfc

Olivera is a town located in the Luján Partido in the province of Buenos Aires, Argentina.

== Geography ==
Olivera is located 90 km (56 mi) from the city of Buenos Aires.

== History ==
During the Federalization of Buenos Aires, as part of the larger Argentine Civil Wars, Olivera was the site of a battle on June 17, 1880, leading to the deaths of around 3,000. A bridge involved in the battle was declared a cultural site in 2018.

== Population ==
According to INDEC, which collects population data for the country, the town had a population of 1,538 people as of the 2001 census.
