= Fernando Olivera (footballer) =

Uruguayan footballer (born 1998)

Personal information
- Full name: Fernando Gabriel Olivera Génova
- Date of birth: 30 April 1998 (age 28)
- Place of birth: Montevideo, Uruguay
- Height: 1.69 m (5 ft 7 in)
- Position: Midfielder

Team information
- Current team: Málaga C

Youth career
- –2017: Liverpool Montevideo
- 2017–2018: Rentistas

Senior career*
Years	Team	Apps	(Gls)
2018–2019	Rentistas	26	(2)
2020	Central Español	4	(1)
2023–	Málaga C		
- * Club domestic league appearances and goals as of 27 November 2020

Fernando Gabriel Olivera Génova (born 30 April 1998) is a Uruguayan footballer who plays as a midfielder for Spanish club Málaga C.

== Career ==
=== Rentistas ===
Olivera made his league debut for the club on 3 March 2018, playing the entirety of a 1-0 away defeat to Villa Teresa.
