= Olivero =

Olivero is a surname. Notable people with the surname include:

== People ==
- Andrea Olivero (born 1970), Italian politician.
- Chester Olivero (born 1994), Anglo Indian. Cochin, Kerala State - India
- Betty Olivero (born 1954), Israeli music educator and composer.
- Bobby Olivero (born 1946), is a former American driver.
- Carlito Olivero (born 1989), American singer and actor.
- Cora Olivero (born 1978), retired Spanish athlete.
- Elinés Olivero (c. 2001–2023), Venezuelan military officer.
- Ernesto Olivero (born 1940), Italian activist and writer.
- Jayce Olivero (born 1998), Gibraltarian footballer.
- Jonathan Pérez Olivero (born 1982), commonly known as Jotha, Spanish former footballer.
- Liliana Olivero (born 1956), Argentine politician.
- Magda Olivero (1910–2014), Italian operatic soprano.
- Matteo Olivero (1879-1932), Italian painter.
- Matteo Olivero (footballer) (born 2000), Italian footballer.
- Ofelia Olivero, Argentine-American biologist.

== See also ==
- Oliveros
- Oliveira
