= Luján Partido =

Luján Partido de Luján
- Department
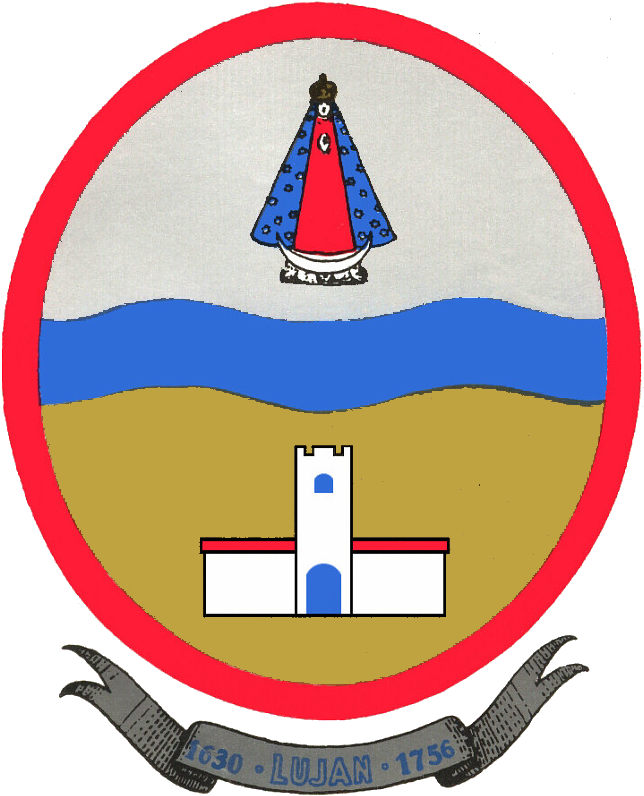
- Coat of arms

- location of Luján Partido in Buenos Aires Province
- Coordinates: 34°34′S 59°06′W
- Country: Argentina
- Established: 1731
- Seat: Luján

Government
  - Intendant: Leonardo Boto (FDT)

Area
  - Total: 800 km^{2} (310 sq mi)

Population
  - Total: 93,992
  - Density: 120/km^{2} (300/sq mi)
- Demonym: lujanense
- Postal Code: B6700
- IFAM: BUE075
- Area Code: 02323
- Patron saint: Nuestra Señora de Luján
- Website: www.lujan.gov.ar

Luján Partido is a partido in the northeastern part of Buenos Aires Province in Argentina.

The provincial subdivision has a population of about 94,000 inhabitants in an area of 800 km^{2} (309 sq mi), and its capital city is Luján, which is 67 km (42 mi) from Buenos Aires.

== Economy ==
The economy of Luján Partido is dominated by farming, other aspects include textile and medical manufacturing, and the production of agrochemicals and agricultural machinery.

== Settlements ==
- Cortínez
- Jáuregui
- Luján
- Olivera
- Open Door
- Carlos Keen
- Pueblo Nuevo
- Torres

== Religious Significance ==
Luján is home to the Basilica of Our Lady of Luján and is a pilgrimage site for Argentine and Latin American Catholics, with a pilgrimage taking place every year leaving from the neighbourhood of Liniers in the city of Buenos Aires.
