= Paulo Ramos (footballer) =

Brazilian footballer

Personal information
- Full name: Paulo Rafael de Oliveira Ramos
- Date of birth: July 30, 1985
- Place of birth: Goiânia, Brazil
- Date of death: September 1, 2009 (aged 24)
- Place of death: Inhumas, Brazil
- Height: 1.81 m (5 ft 11 1/2 in)
- Position: Attacking midfielder

Youth career
- 2001–2002: Vila Nova

Senior career*
Years	Team	Apps	(Gls)
2003–2009	Vila Nova		
2005–2006	→ Grêmio (loan)	7	(0)
2007	→ Juventude (loan)	1	(0)
- * Club domestic league appearances and goals

Paulo Rafael de Oliveira Ramos or simply Paulo Ramos (July 30, 1985 – September 1, 2009), was a Brazilian attacking midfielder who played for Vila Nova, Grêmio and Juventude. He was born in Goiânia.

== Death ==
He died of cardiac arrhythmia on September 1, 2009, in Inhumas, while as part of Vila Nova's squad.
