= Fernando Oliveira =

Brazilian footballer (born 1984)

Personal information
- Full name: Fernando Oliveira de Avila
- Date of birth: May 11, 1984 (age 42)
- Place of birth: Porto Alegre, Brazil
- Position: Forward

Team information
- Current team: Ayacucho FC
- Number: 18

Senior career*
| Years | Team | Apps | (Gls) |
| 2005–2006 | General Caballero | | |
| 2006 | Club Blooming | | |
| 2007 | Club Atlético 3 de Febrero | | |
| 2007–2008 | Deportes Tolima | | |
| 2009 | La Equidad | 10 | (1) |
| 2010 | Envigado Fútbol Club | 28 | (5) |
| 2011 | General Caballero | 25 | (5) |
| 2012–2016 | Ayacucho FC | 99 | (34) |
- * Club domestic league appearances and goals as of 8 July 2015

Fernando Oliveira De Avila (born in Pelotas, Brazil, May 11, 1984) is a retired Brazilian footballer. He played in the forward position and his last team was the Peruvian Primera División side Ayacucho FC. Oliveira was the 2006 División Intermedia's second leading goal scorer with 11 anotations.
