= San Miguel de Tucumán =

City in Argentina

San Miguel de Tucumán Tucumán
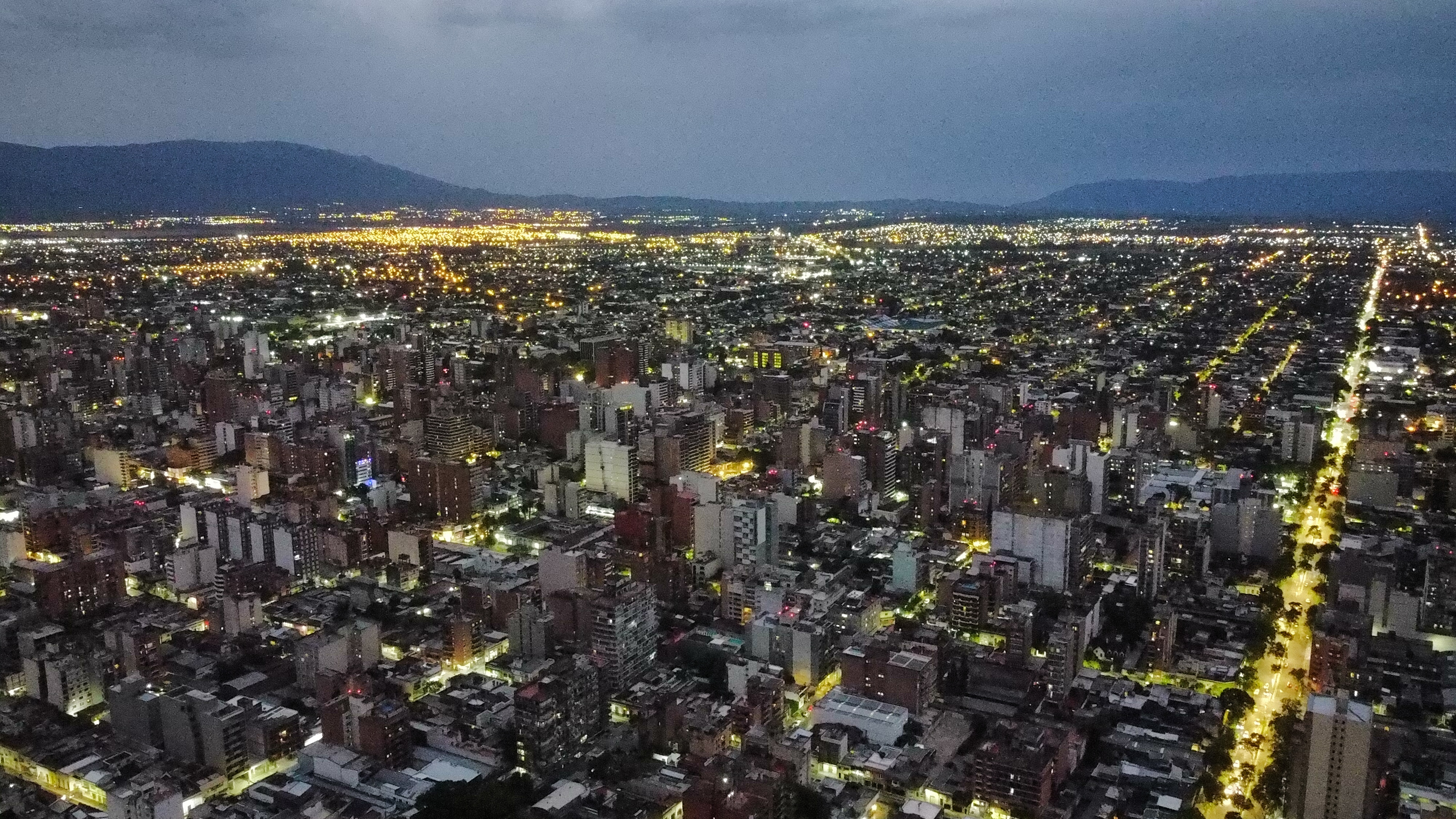
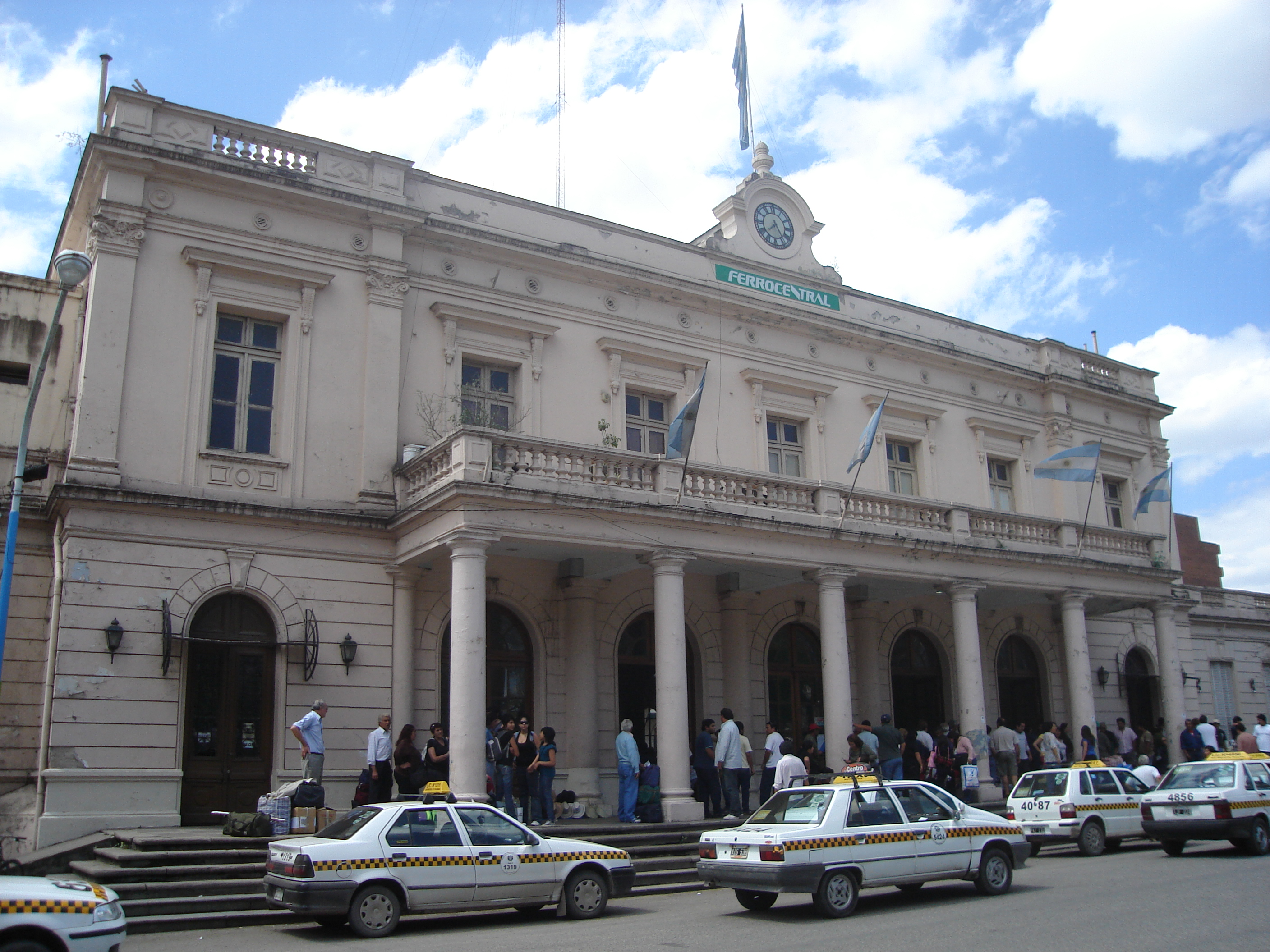
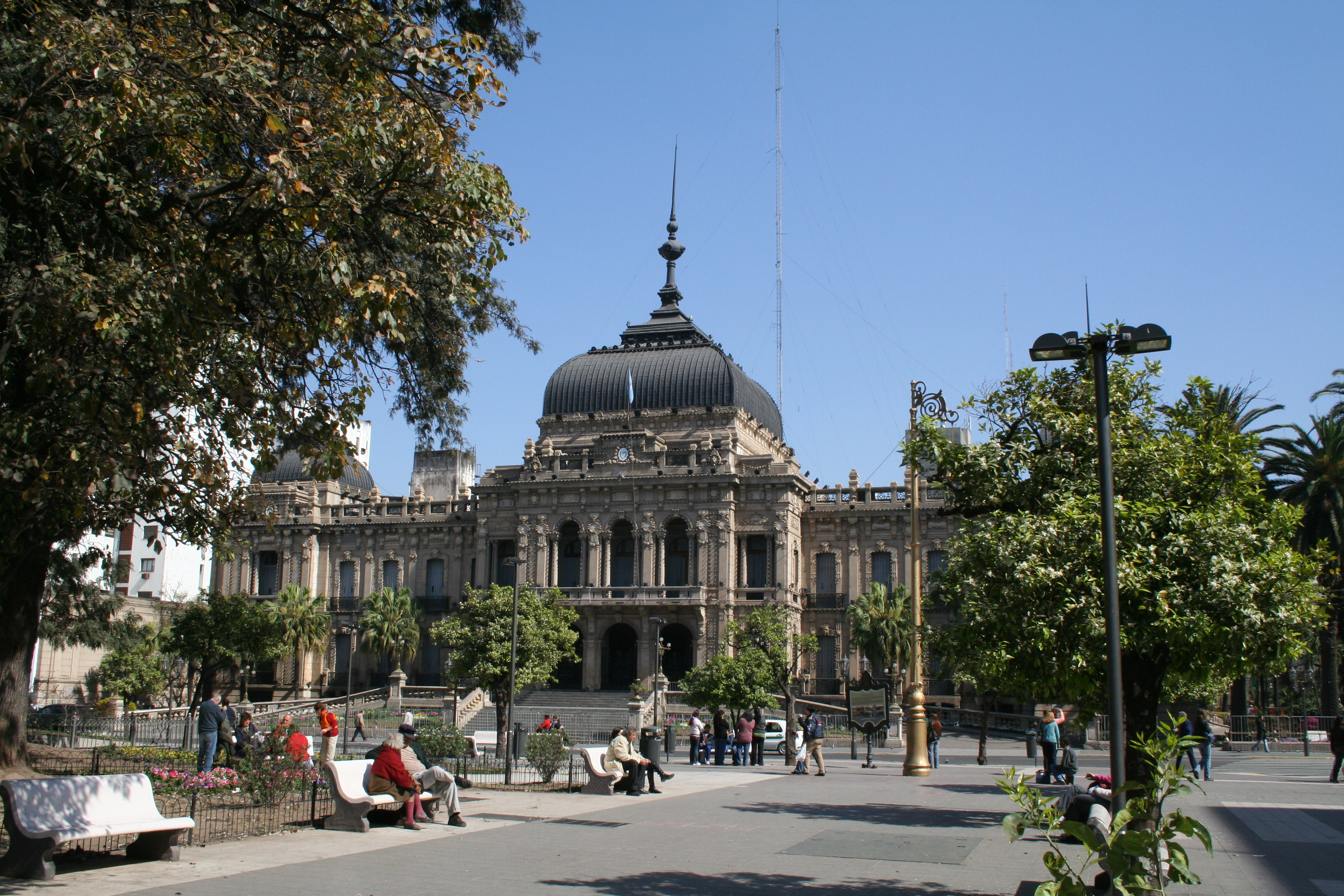
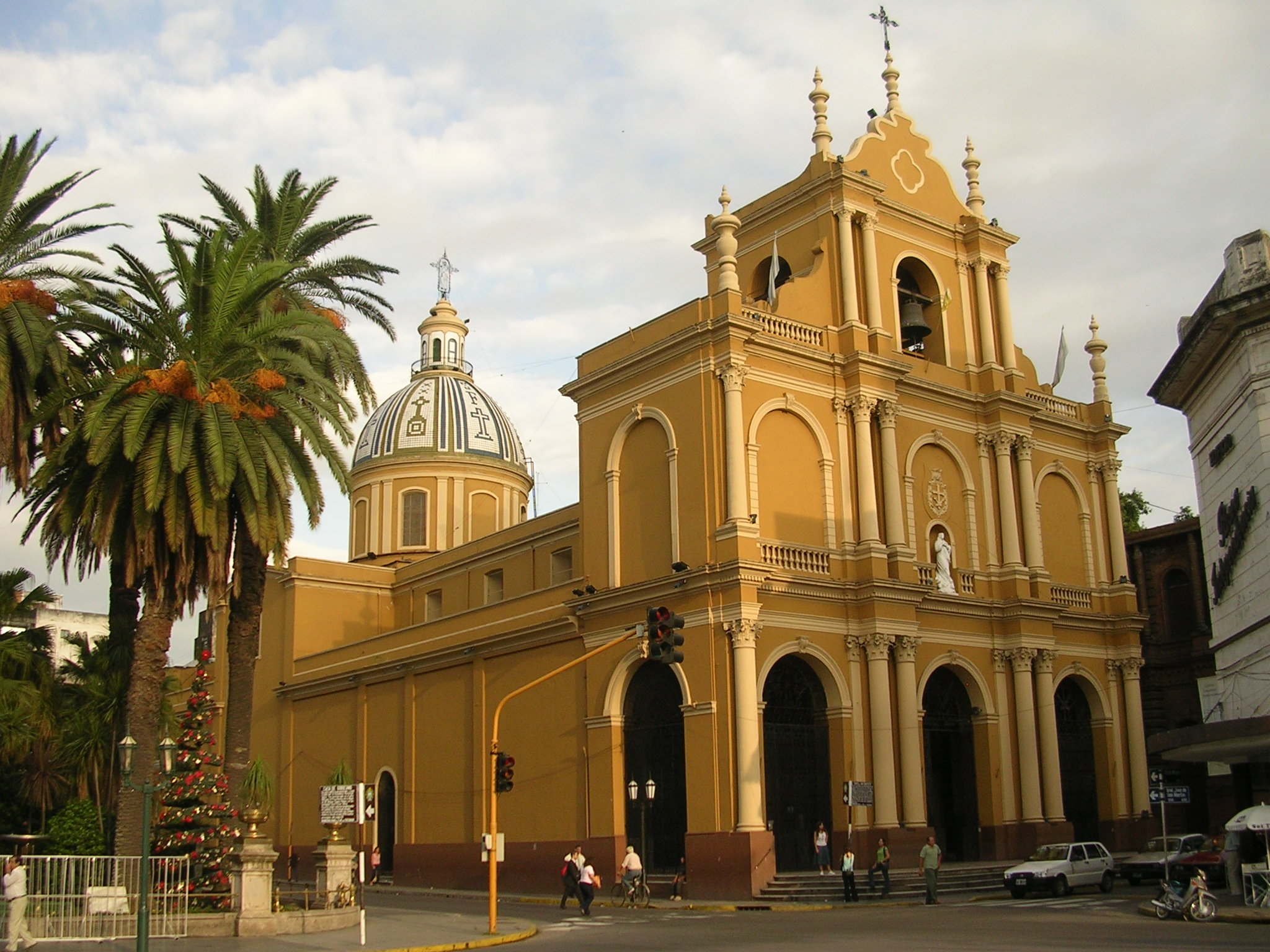
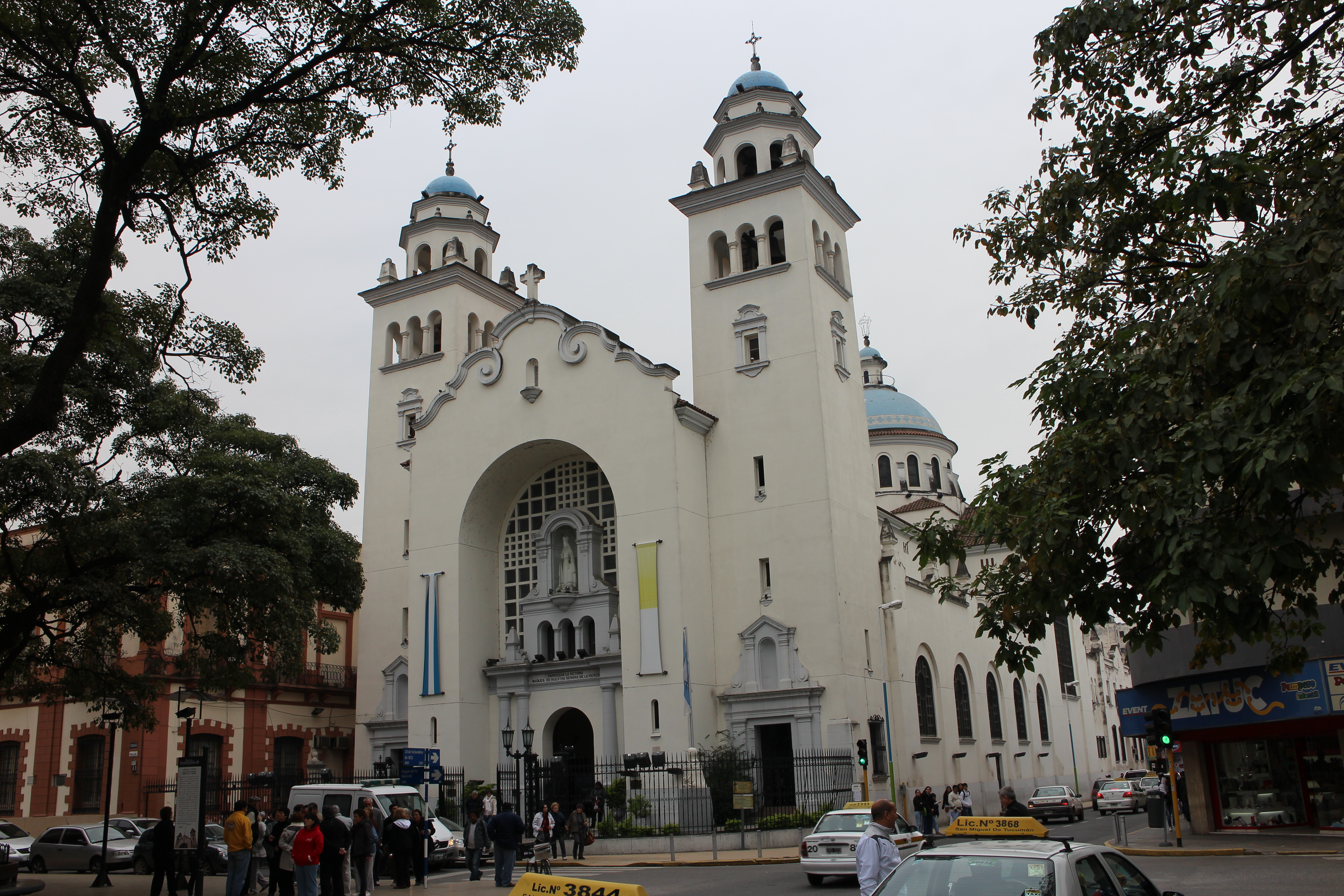
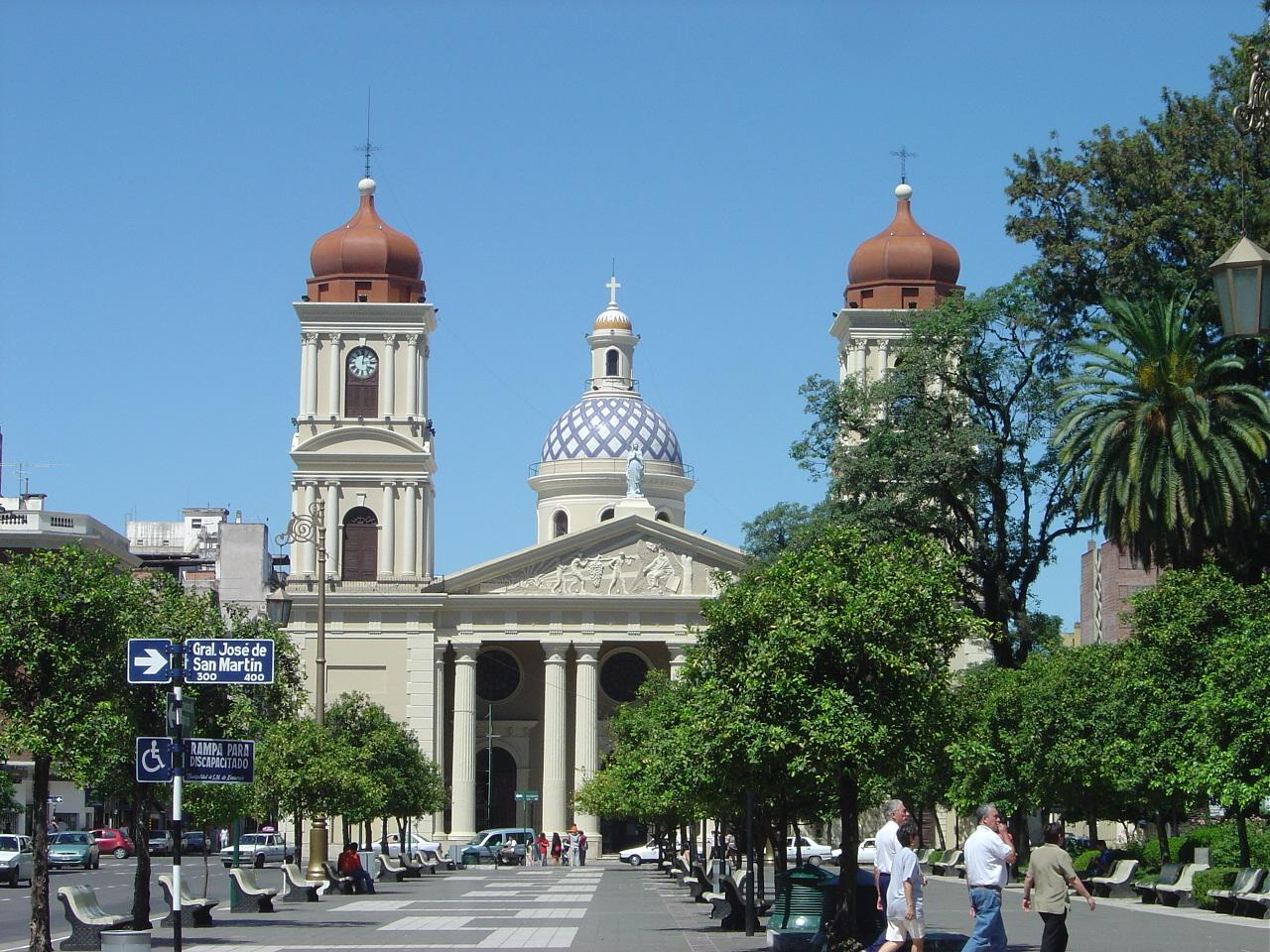
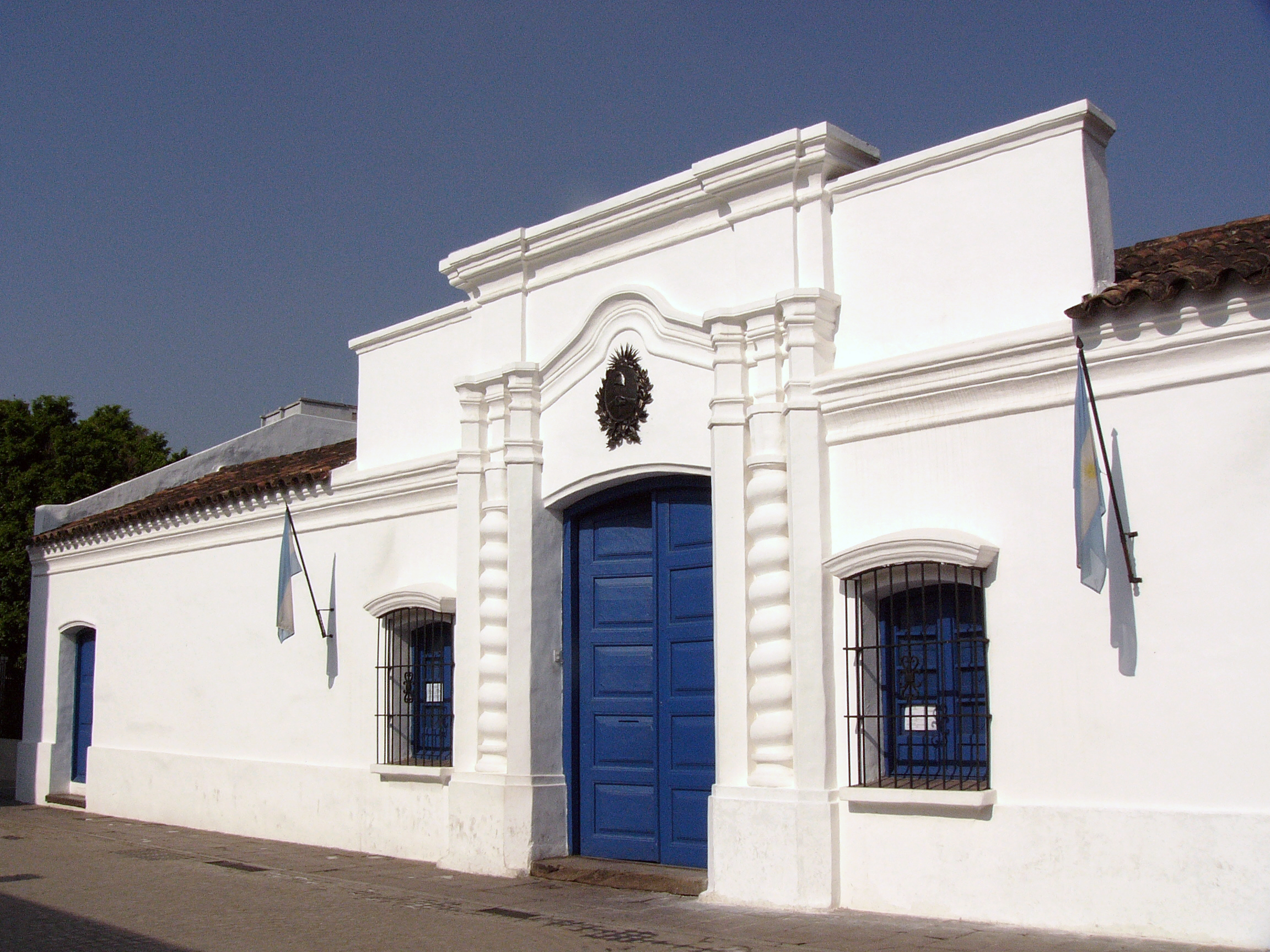
- Skyline of San Miguel de Tucumán Tucumán Mitre railway station Tucumán Government Palace Basilica of St. Francis Church of La Merced San Miguel de Tucumán Cathedral Casa de Tucumán

- Coat of arms

- Location within Argentina
- Coordinates: 26°49′59.00″S 65°13′00″W
- Country: Argentina
- Province: Tucumán
- Department: Capital
- Established: 1565, 1685

Government
  - Intendant: Rossana Chahla (PJ)

Area
  - City: 90 km^{2} (35 sq mi)
  - Metro: 480 km^{2} (190 sq mi)
- Elevation: 431 m (1,414 ft)

Population (2010 census)
  - Density: 5,862.3/km^{2} (15,183/sq mi)
  - Urban: 548,866
  - Metro: 830,000

GDP (PPP, constant 2015 values)
  - Year: 2023
  - Total: $20.3 billion
- Time zone: UTC−3 (ART)
- Postal code: T4000
- Climate: Cwa
- Website: smt.gob.ar

San Miguel de Tucumán (Spanish pronunciation: [ˈsam miˈɣel de tukuˈman]), usually called simply Tucumán, is the capital and largest city of Tucumán Province, located in northern Argentina 1,311 kilometres (815 mi) from Buenos Aires. It is the fifth-largest city of Argentina after Buenos Aires, Córdoba, Rosario and Mendoza and the most important city of the northern region. The Spanish conquistador Diego de Villarroel founded the city in 1565 in the course of an expedition from present-day Peru. Tucumán moved to its present site in 1685.

== Overview ==
The city is bordered on the north by Las Talitas (Tafí Viejo), on the east by Banda del Río Salí and Alderetes (Cruz Alta), on the west by the city of Yerba Buena, and on the south by Lules.

The city is located on the slopes of the Aconquija mountains, the easternmost mountain range before the large Chaco-Pampean flats. It is the commercial center of an irrigated area that produces large quantities of sugarcane, rice, tobacco, and fruit, giving the province its nickname, the Garden of the Republic. The National University of Tucumán (1914) and the Saint Thomas Aquinas University of the North (1965) are in the city.

On July 9, 1816, a congress gathered in Tucumán declared independence from Spain, which did not officially recognize it until 1862. The meeting place of the congress, the House of Tucumán, has been reconstructed as a national monument. After the national government broke down in 1820, the town was capital of the short-lived Republic of Tucumán.

Its telephone code is 0381, and its postal codes are T4000 (Center), T4001 (North), T4002 (South) and T4003 (East).

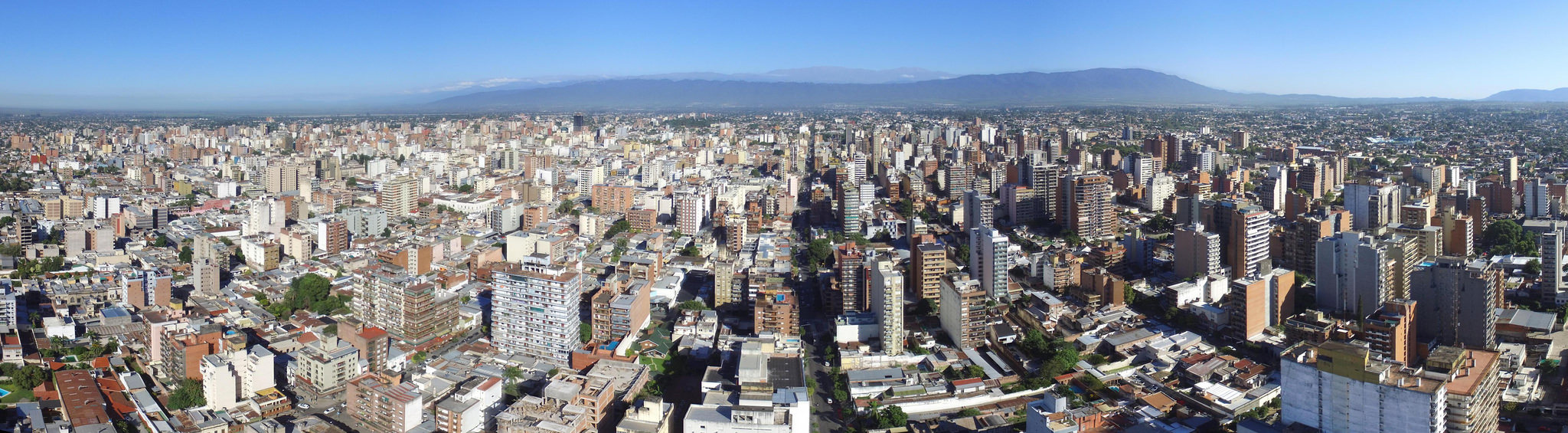
Panoramic view of the city's center

== Climate ==
San Miguel de Tucumán lies in a transition zone between temperate climates to the south, and subtropical climates to the north. It has a humid subtropical climate (Cwa) under the Köppen climate classification, with vastly more precipitation in the summer than in the winter. The average annual temperature is 19.3 °C (66.7 °F). The precipitation pattern is monsoonal: out of the 966 mm (38.0 in) that fall annually, most of it falls in the summer months, while the winter months tend to be drier. The average temperature in winter is 13.6 °C (56.5 °F). July is the coldest month with a mean temperature of 12.1 °C (53.8 °F). Frosts are uncommon, with some years recording no frosts at all. Usually, when frosts occur, they are light with temperatures rarely falling below −2 °C (28.4 °F). Winters are sunny, averaging 9–12 clear days and 9–12 overcast days per month. Snow is extremely rare, but in 2007, it reached the city center. There have been other episodes of sleet and snow in the mountains around the city, and in 2010, sleet was reported downtown again, a very rare event.

Spring and fall are transition seasons. Springs are very short, and by October, summer weather settles in the city, with highs beyond 30 °C (86.0 °F) very common. This is due to the dryness of the season: daytime highs are close to those in the summer, when rainfall and clouds are persistent, whereas spring is often sunny and arid. April marks the beginning of the fall, but temperatures remain near summer levels: 21 to 27 °C (69.8 to 80.6 °F) during the day, and 12 to 18 °C (53.6 to 64.4 °F) during the night. Rainfall decreases as fall progresses.

Summers are the hottest and most humid time of year. The average temperature during the summer ranges from 24 to 26 °C (75.2 to 78.8 °F). In the summer, one can expect daytime highs ranging from 30 to 31 °C (86.0 to 87.8 °F); at night, 19 to 20 °C (66.2 to 68.0 °F) are the norm. Much of the rainfall that the city receives occurs during the summer months and cloudy weather tends to be more common, averaging 11–13 overcast days and only 2–4 clear days per month. Heat waves can push temperatures up to 40 to 45 °C (104.0 to 113.0 °F). However, some relief is possible after cold fronts from the south caused by Pampero winds which brings in cooler air. These winds can be strong following a hot day in advance of the cold fronts.

The highest temperature recorded was 45.0 °C (113.0 °F) on October 31, 2009 while the lowest temperature recorded was −3.0 °C (26.6 °F) on July 16, 1962.

Climate data for San Miguel de Tucumán (1991–2020, extremes 1961–present)
| Month | Jan | Feb | Mar | Apr | May | Jun | Jul | Aug | Sep | Oct | Nov | Dec | Year |
|---|---|---|---|---|---|---|---|---|---|---|---|---|---|
| Record high °C (°F) | 42.2 (108.0) | 41.7 (107.1) | 39.0 (102.2) | 35.6 (96.1) | 34.1 (93.4) | 29.5 (85.1) | 39.3 (102.7) | 39.2 (102.6) | 41.8 (107.2) | 45.0 (113.0) | 44.8 (112.6) | 44.0 (111.2) | 45.0 (113.0) |
| Mean daily maximum °C (°F) | 31.3 (88.3) | 29.7 (85.5) | 27.9 (82.2) | 24.9 (76.8) | 21.4 (70.5) | 19.0 (66.2) | 19.4 (66.9) | 23.3 (73.9) | 26.3 (79.3) | 28.9 (84.0) | 30.3 (86.5) | 31.3 (88.3) | 26.1 (79.0) |
| Daily mean °C (°F) | 25.3 (77.5) | 24.2 (75.6) | 22.7 (72.9) | 19.6 (67.3) | 15.9 (60.6) | 13.0 (55.4) | 12.3 (54.1) | 15.2 (59.4) | 18.4 (65.1) | 21.8 (71.2) | 23.7 (74.7) | 25.1 (77.2) | 19.8 (67.6) |
| Mean daily minimum °C (°F) | 20.3 (68.5) | 19.7 (67.5) | 18.5 (65.3) | 15.5 (59.9) | 11.8 (53.2) | 8.5 (47.3) | 6.9 (44.4) | 8.7 (47.7) | 11.5 (52.7) | 15.4 (59.7) | 17.7 (63.9) | 19.5 (67.1) | 14.5 (58.1) |
| Record low °C (°F) | 11.3 (52.3) | 10.1 (50.2) | 7.8 (46.0) | 3.9 (39.0) | 0.2 (32.4) | −2.2 (28.0) | −3.0 (26.6) | −2.5 (27.5) | −0.4 (31.3) | 2.5 (36.5) | 4.8 (40.6) | 9.9 (49.8) | −3.0 (26.6) |
| Average precipitation mm (inches) | 238.0 (9.37) | 181.9 (7.16) | 134.6 (5.30) | 61.6 (2.43) | 27.6 (1.09) | 12.9 (0.51) | 5.4 (0.21) | 6.4 (0.25) | 15.1 (0.59) | 63.8 (2.51) | 102.3 (4.03) | 160.1 (6.30) | 1,009.7 (39.75) |
| Average precipitation days (≥ 0.1 mm) | 12.7 | 11.1 | 12.0 | 9.4 | 7.5 | 4.9 | 2.8 | 1.5 | 3.1 | 7.4 | 10.1 | 11.5 | 93.9 |
| Average snowy days | 0.0 | 0.0 | 0.0 | 0.0 | 0.0 | 0.0 | 0.0 | 0.1 | 0.0 | 0.0 | 0.0 | 0.0 | 0.1 |
| Average relative humidity (%) | 73.4 | 76.9 | 80.0 | 80.2 | 79.7 | 77.6 | 69.4 | 59.2 | 55.9 | 61.0 | 65.3 | 69.1 | 70.6 |
| Mean monthly sunshine hours | 229.4 | 186.5 | 173.6 | 153.0 | 145.7 | 135.0 | 186.0 | 204.6 | 198.0 | 195.3 | 213.0 | 229.4 | 2,249.5 |
| Mean daily sunshine hours | 7.4 | 6.6 | 5.6 | 5.1 | 4.7 | 4.5 | 6.0 | 6.6 | 6.6 | 6.3 | 7.1 | 7.4 | 6.2 |
| Percentage possible sunshine | 52.9 | 46.2 | 45.3 | 46.8 | 44.9 | 47.5 | 60.3 | 57.0 | 55.4 | 50.7 | 50.6 | 60.0 | 51.5 |
Source: Servicio Meteorológico Nacional (percent sun 1991–2000)

== History ==
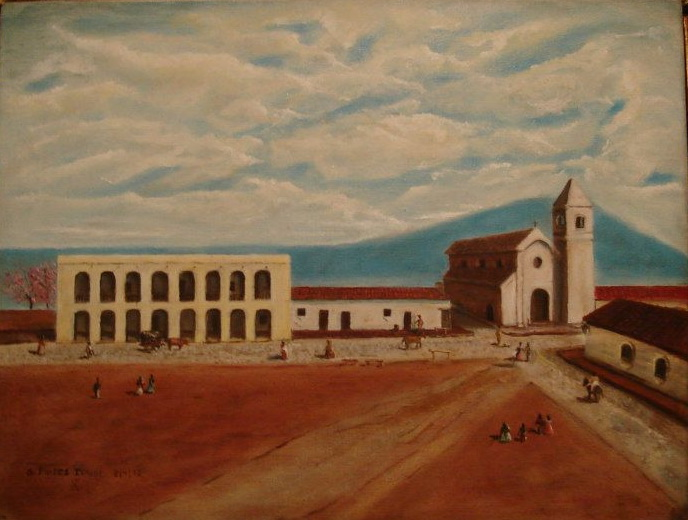
"Tucumán 1812", by Gerardo Flores Ivaldi. The Cabildo and San Francisco church are displayed on the painting.

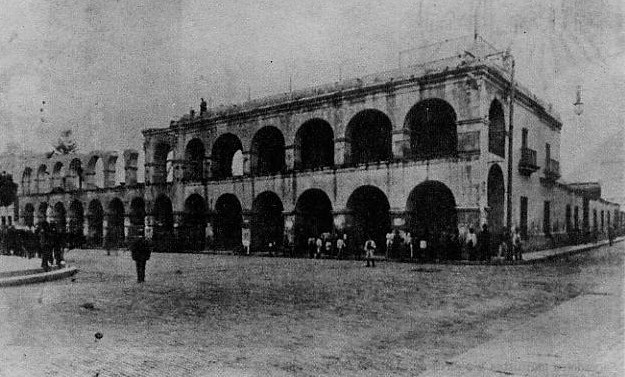
Demolition of the former Cabildo, 1908.

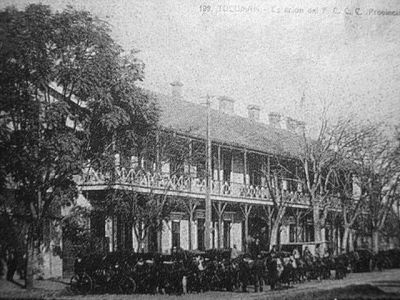
Former Tucumán station built by North Western Railway, c. 1890.

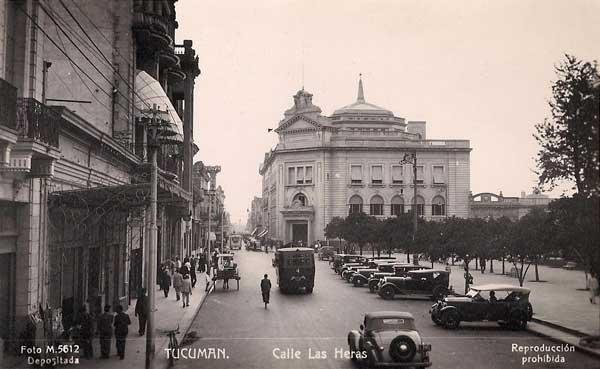
San Martín street in San Miguel downtown.

The first foundation of "San Miguel de Tucumán y Nueva Tierra de Promisión" was on May 31, 1565 by Diego de Villarroel in the Campos de Ibatín, 60 kilometres (37 mi) to the southwest from where the current city is located nowadays. The city was moved to "La Toma" (where the old town or casco histórico is placed today) in 1685, due to the low quality of Ibatín water.

On September 24, 1812, the Battle of Tucumán took place near the city, when the Spanish army coming from Upper Peru were defeated by the army led by Manuel Belgrano. Belgrano had been obliged to fall back to Córdoba by the government of Buenos Aires, but the inhabitants of Tucumán called on him to resist another Spanish invasion.

With his troops almost unarmed and tired but reinforced by local gauchos (calling themselves Los decididos (The determined ones) de Tucumán), Belgrano attacked the Spanish army from behind, defeating them and ensuring the Independence of Argentina. After the battle of Tucumán, the same army led by Belgrano would achieve another victory at the Battle of Salta.

After those battles, Belgrano established a circular fortress known as "La Ciudadela", located 1 kilometre (0.62 mi) from the current Plaza de la Independencia (former Plaza Mayor). Because it had patriot barracks and was located on an intermediate point between the Río de la Plata and the Upper Peru and Santa Cruz de la Sierra, San Miguel de Tucumán was designated as the venue for the Congress of Independence. On July 9, 1816, the Independence of Argentina was declared, not only from Spain but from any other foreign domination. The act of the Independence was signed at the Casa de Tucumán, also named "Casa Histórica" or "Casa de la Independencia".

By 1850 the city's population had increased considerably, surpassing the estimated registers. Because of that, in 1870 it was proposed that the city be expanded, setting new limits. During those years, the first railway line reached the city, built by British-owned Córdoba Central Railway. The immigrants arriving in the region (most of whom were Spanish, Arabic, Jewish, and Italian) influenced the architectural style that adapted to those new cultures, leaving the original colonial style behind. Therefore, new buildings in the city were made in Neoclassical, eclectic and picturesque styles.

During the first years of the 20th century, the city added 400 hectares (990 acres) for recreational uses, and the first great park (similar to those existing in Paris and London) was thus established. By 1930 the city's population had doubled.

== Cultural and tourist heritage ==
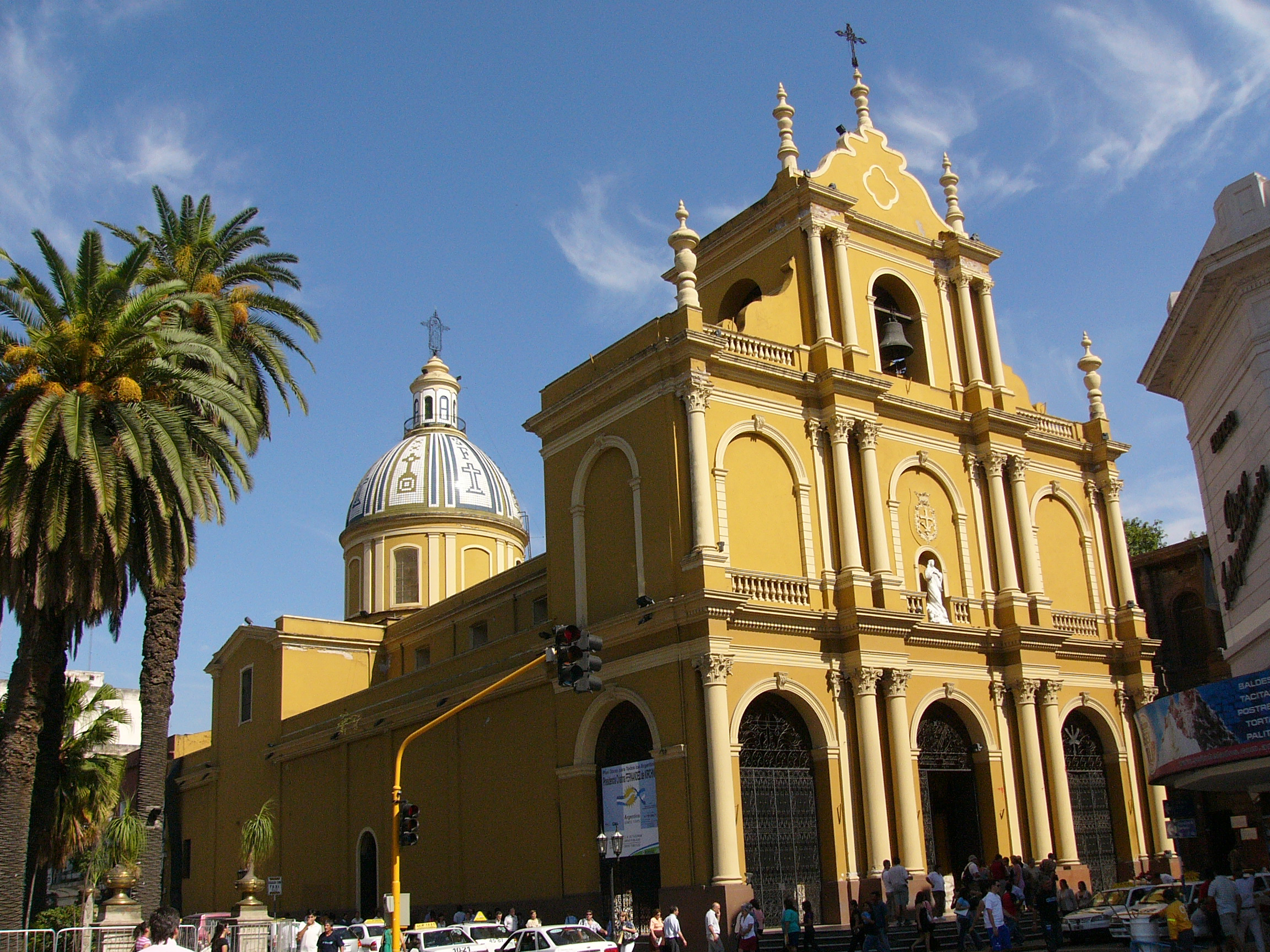
Basílica de San Francisco

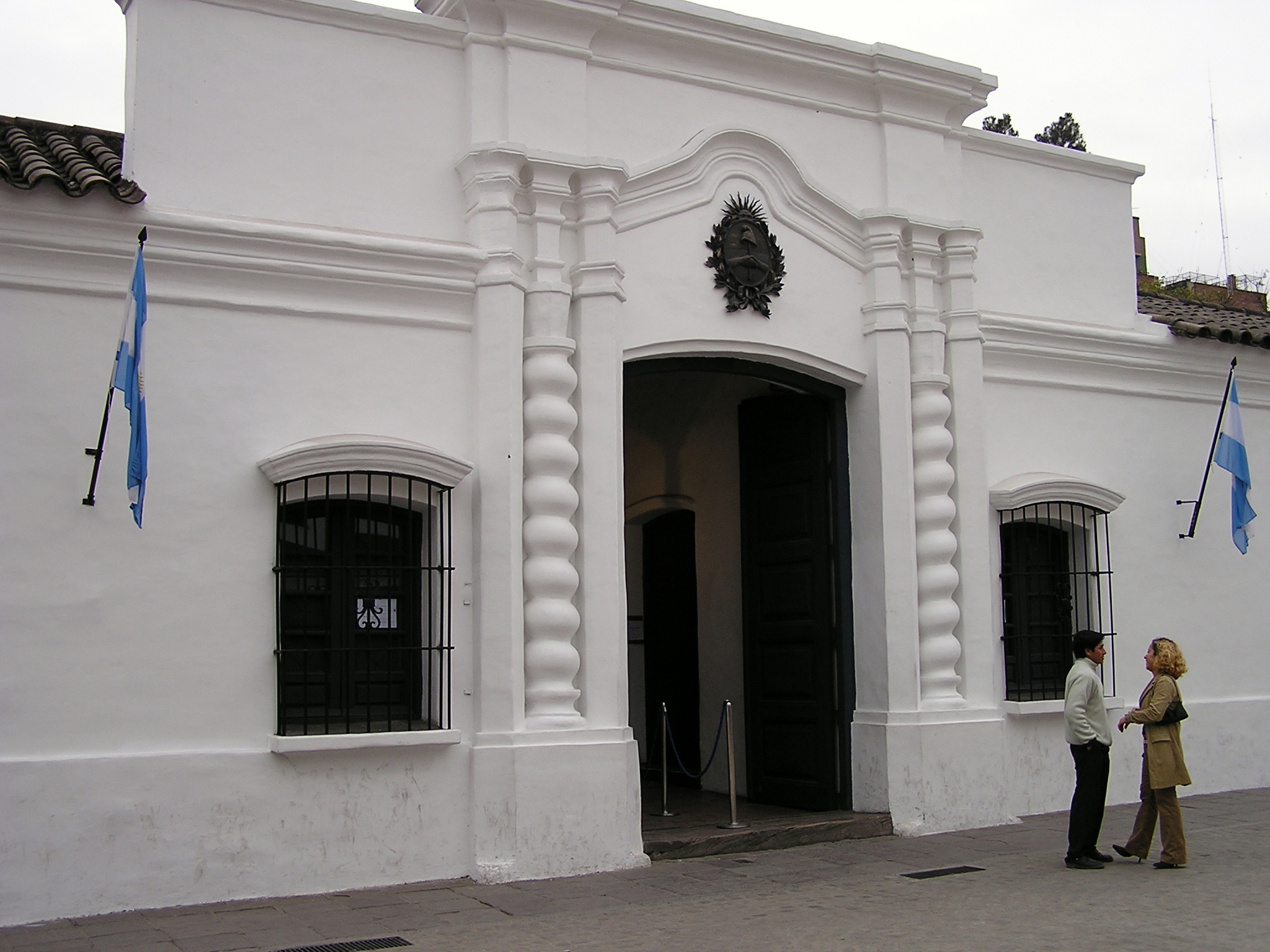
Casa de Tucumán, where Argentine Independence was declared.

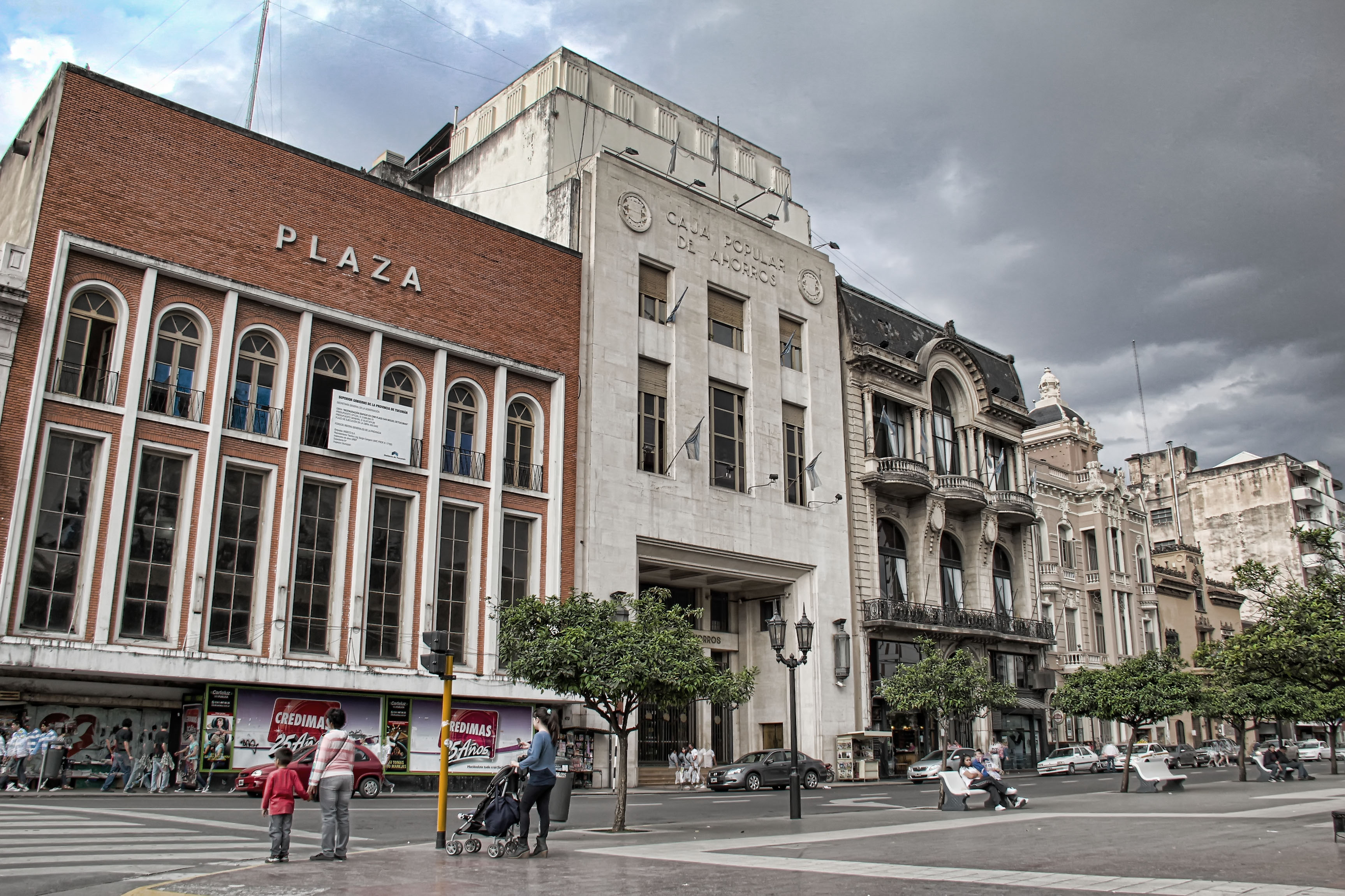
Historic buildings surrounding the Plaza Independencia.

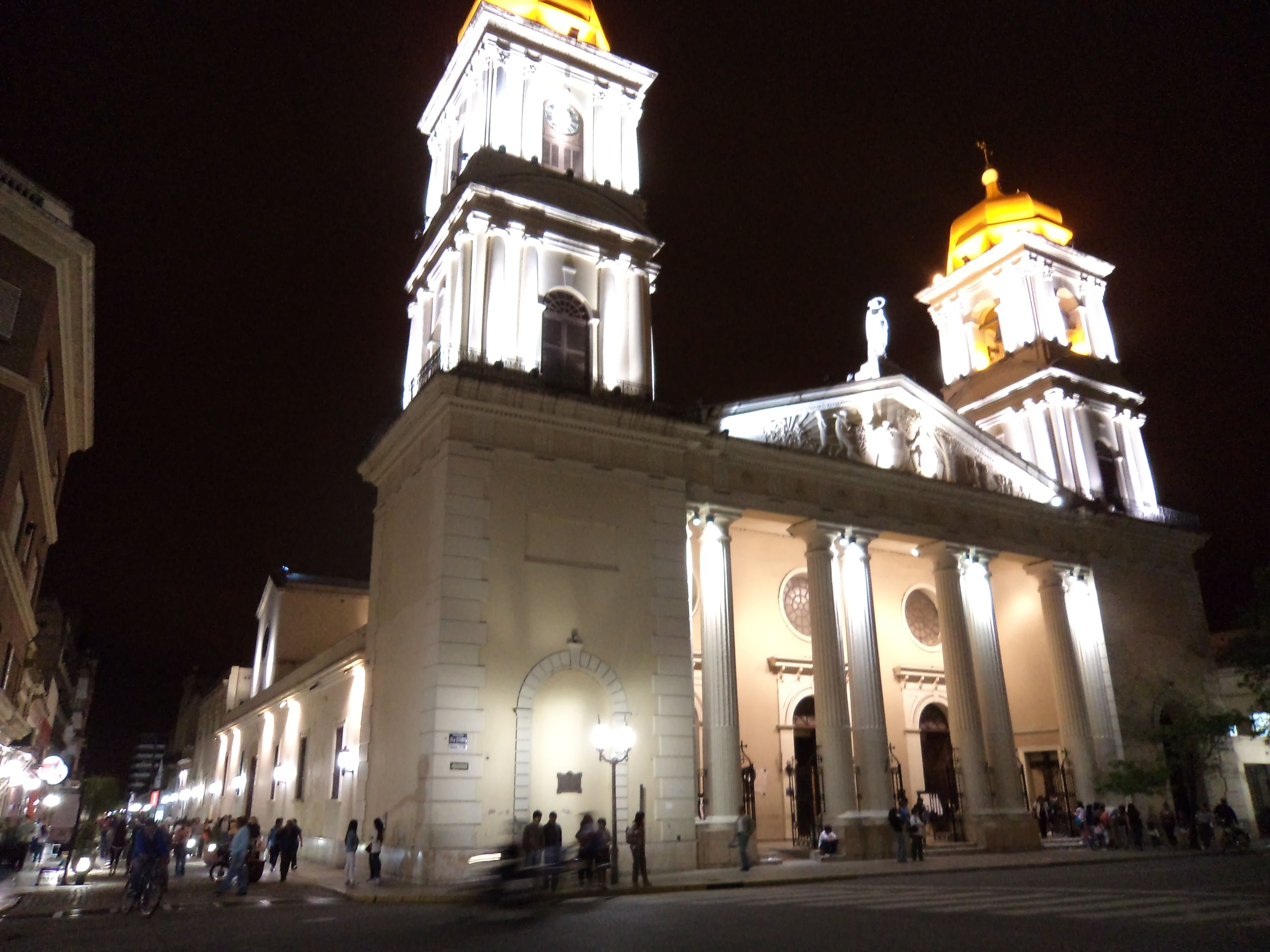
Cathedral

The House of Government of Tucumán was built in Art Nouveau style at the end of 19th century. The White Room is commonly used to receive notable people who visit the city.

In the city downtown, the San Miguel de Tucumán Cathedral still preserves some colonial elements and other elements from Italian architecture. The Basílica de San Francisco (also declared a historical heritage), the Parroquia de San Roque, Basílica del Santísimo Sacramento (known as "Iglesia de Santo Domingo"), Basílica de Nuestra Señora de la Merced and the Iglesia Nuestra Señora de Lourdes are some of the most important churches of the city.

The Casa de Tucumán (or "Casa de la Independencia"), as the site of the declaration of independence of Argentina, is the most significant building in the city. After the Congress of Tucumán various people lived in the house and deterioration became visible over the years, which is clearly evident in the famous photo taken by Angel Paganelli in 1869. The Government of Argentina acquired the historic house in 1874 with a view to its serving as a post office. Starting in the 1880s celebrations took place in the building to commemorate Independence.

Nevertheless, the government did not remodel the house until 1903, when it was demolished almost completely due to its very poor condition. The only room that was preserved from demolition was the room where the Independence was declared by the congressists. In 1942 the house was completely rebuilt, based on the original plans and the picture taken by Paganelli in 1869. For that purpose, the same kind of bricks, tejas (roof tiles) and baldosas (stone floor tiles) were used.

Other notable buildings of San Miguel include the Teatro San Martín (with some elements in neoclassical style), and the Correo Central, made in a mix of styles and a tower inspired in the palaces of Florence (specially Palazzo Vecchio), the old Legislature, the Palace of Justice, the Casino (former Savoy Hotel, built in 1912), the birthplace of Nicolás Avellaneda, the Colegio Nacional Bartolomé Mitre and the Campo de las Carreras, where the battle of Tucumán took place and which is now an historical park.

=== Main sights ===
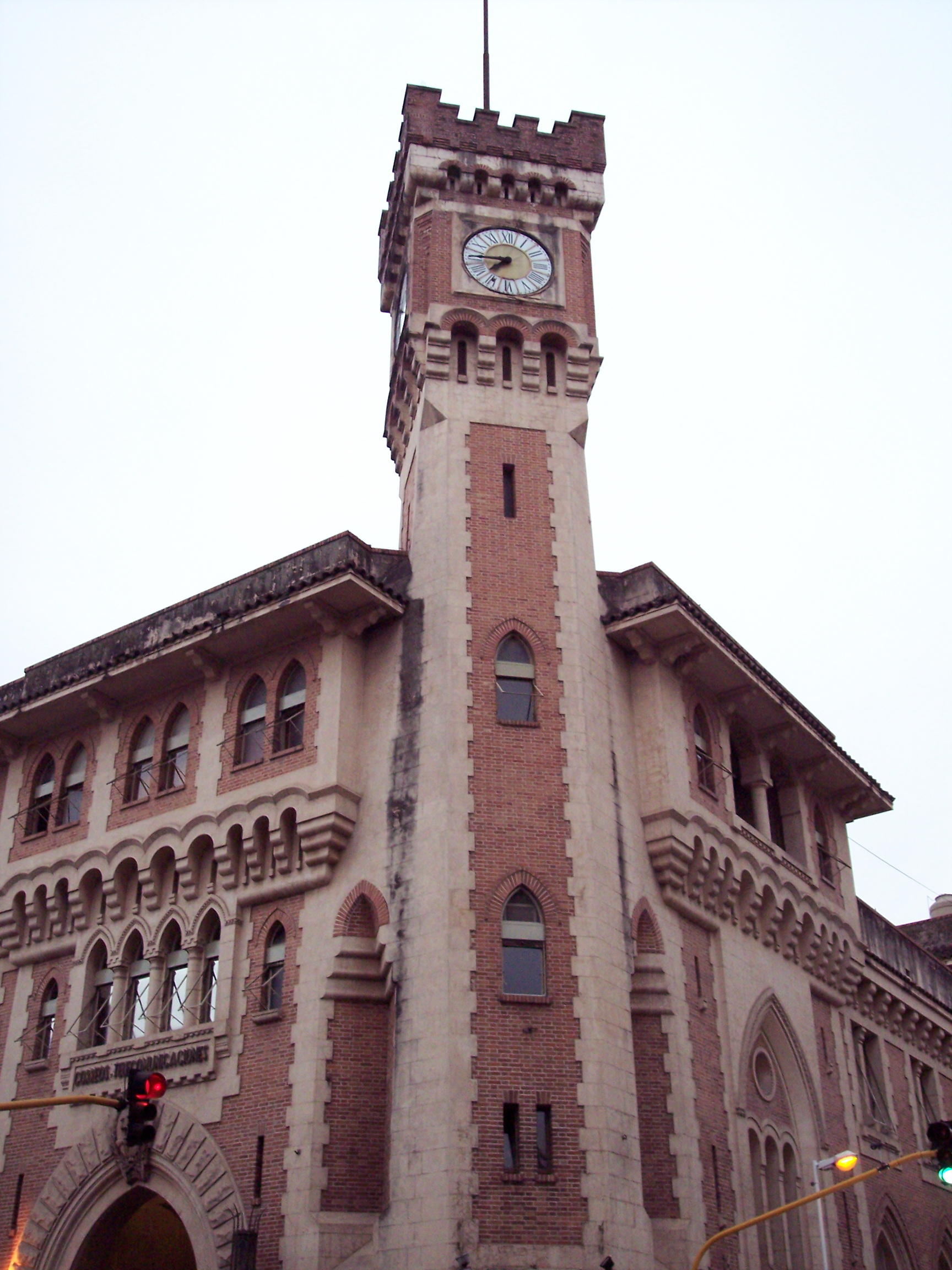
Post office

- Independence House
- Tucumán Government Palace
- Ninth of July Park
- Timoteo Navarro Museum of Art
- Cementerio del Oeste
- President Avellaneda's House
- Independence Square
- Museum of Northern Folklore
- Federación Económica Building
- Padilla House
- San Francisco Basilica
- Cathedral
- Museum of Sacred Art
- La Merced Church

== Cultural life and education ==
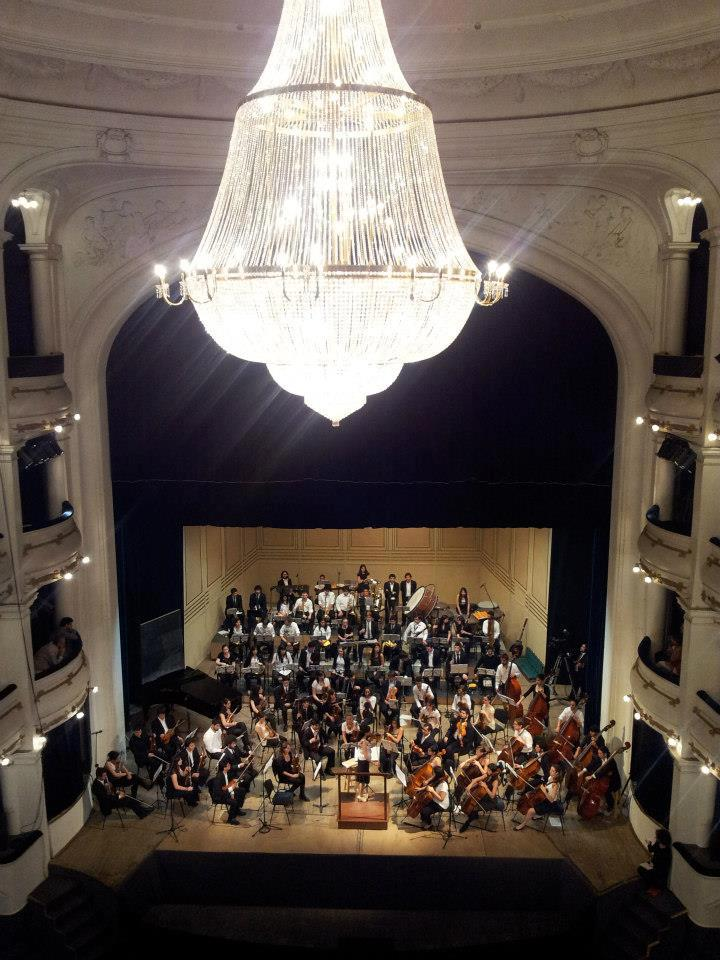
Interior of the San Martín theatre.

For decades, San Miguel de Tucumán has been one of the cultural spots in the country, in part due to the influence of the National University of Tucumán. It has been the birthplace and/or home of well-known personalities such as folk singer Mercedes Sosa, author Tomas Eloy Martínez, a professor at Rutgers University in the United States; musician Miguel Ángel Estrella, artist/architect Tomás Saraceno, painter Luis Lobo de la Vega, and many others.

Two large theatres (San Martín and Alberdi) and several smaller and independent theaters offer a wide array of events, including plays, concerts, operas, and ballet, all year round. The Septiembre Musical is by far the most important cultural event during the year. This music festival, generally held at Independence Square, brings together several local and national artists who perform different musical styles ranging from folk music to rock.

Universities in the city include the public National University of Tucumán and the National Technological University, and the private (and Catholic) Saint Thomas Aquinas University of the North and the Saint Paul T University.

Since August 2008, the city has been the location of trials of high-ranking former military officers charged with war crimes from the 1976–83 dictatorship. Luciano Menéndez, a former colonel, was convicted for crimes against humanity, including the kidnapping and disappearance of senator Guillermo Vargas Aignasse on the night of the golpe (coup) in 1976. Many Abuelas de la Plaza de Mayo (Grandmothers of the Plaza de Mayo) have been seen in and around the Tucumán trials. The convictions of Menéndez and Ricardo Bussi were the first of this round of prosecution of military leaders of the Jorge Rafael Videla dictatorship. Their sentencings were seen as symbolic victories for the mothers and grandmothers whose children or husbands "were disappeared" by the military during that dark period of Argentine history.

== Sports ==
Association football is the most popular sport in the city. San Miguel's main football clubs are Club Atlético San Martín de Tucumán and Club Atlético Tucumán. Club Atletico San Martín is based out of San Miguel de Tucumán and was founded in 1909. This team has won four total national titles (1944, 1988, 2005, and 2007–08) and several regional titles. The longtime rival, Club Atletico Tucumán, is also based in the city of San Miguel de Tucumán but was founded in 1901. This team is the oldest football club in the Tucumán Province and the team has five national titles (1959, 2004, 2005, 2007–08, and 2008–09) and also many regional titles.

Basketball is also a popular sport, some clubs are Juan Bautista Alberdi Club, Central Córdoba Club, Belgrano Club, Villa Luján Club, Tucumán BB Club and others. Tucumán was one of two co-hosts of the 1995 FIBA Americas Championship.

The city is also a rugby union hotbed and hosts the Unión de Rugby de Tucumán, as well as the province's two most successful clubs: Tucumán Rugby Club and Universitario. The rugby of Tucumán is the second most powerful in the Argentine, behind the Rugby of the Buenos Aires Union. For eight times, the Naranjas (Oranges) won the Argentine Championship of Unions; this is the greatest number won by a hinterland union. Other important rugby clubs of the city are Natación y Gimnasia, Cardenales, Tucumán Lawn Tennis, Los Tarcos, amongst others. The fans of the rugby of Tucumán are the most passionate among the Argentines.

== Transport ==
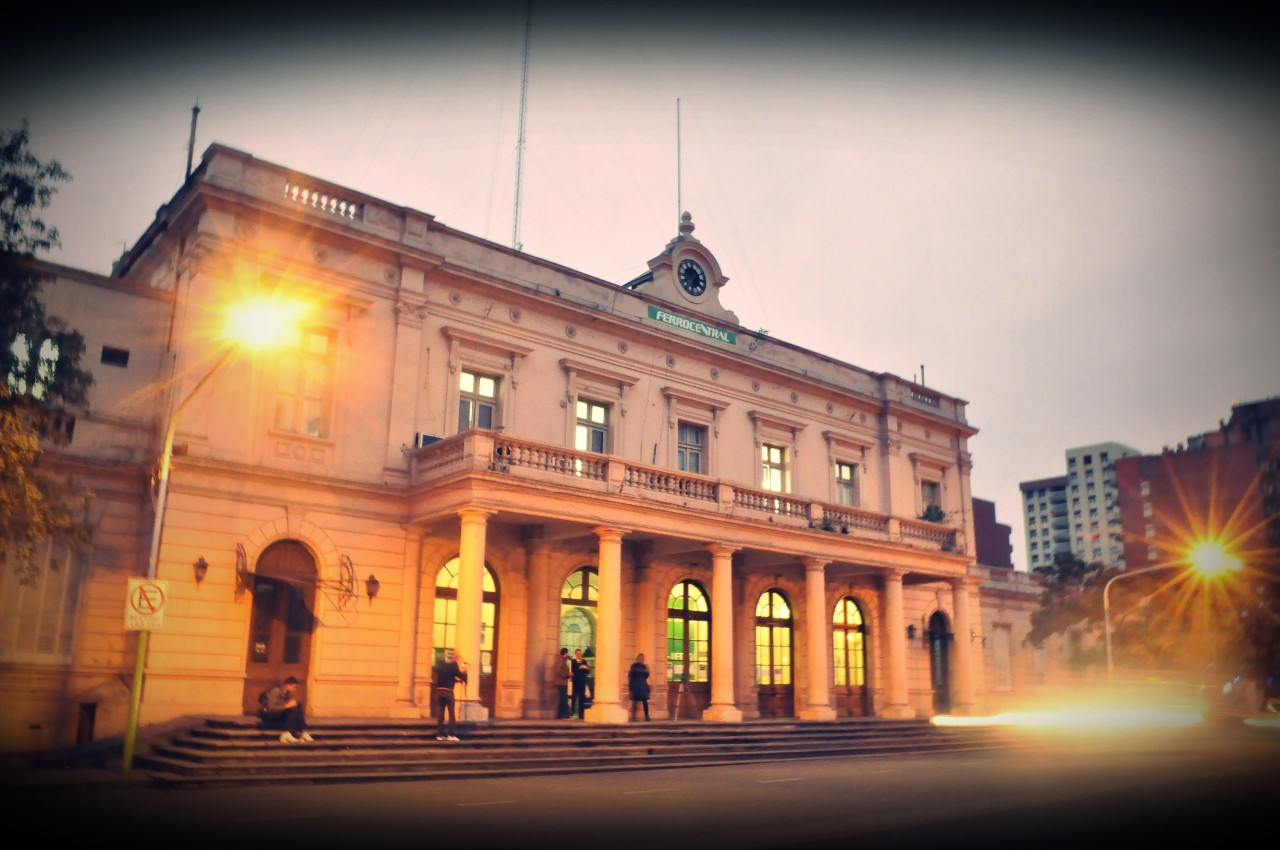
The Mitre Railway station, the only terminal active for passenger services

The city is served by several bus lines that have routes within the city limits, and some others that connect it to the neighbouring cities of Yerba Buena, El Manantial, Tafí Viejo, Las Talitas, Banda del Río Salí, and Alderetes. San Miguel de Tucumán enjoys one of the largest bus stations in Argentina. The 30,000 m^{2} estación central de ómnibus (opened in 1994) is the point from where hundreds of bus services arrive from and depart to almost all of the largest and mid-size cities throughout the country.

The Teniente General Benjamín Matienzo International Airport (TUC/SANT) is the city's airport (though located 12 kilometres (7.5 mi) east of the city, in the neighboring department of Cruz Alta) serving over 290,000 passengers a year. There are daily flights to Buenos Aires, Jujuy, Santiago del Estero, Campo Arenal, the Minera Alumbrera Gold Mine, as well as international flights to Santa Cruz de la Sierra, Bolivia. The Mauricio Gilli Aerodrome is a private airport, located 16 kilometres (9.9 mi) west from the city, for private aviation. It is locally known as Aeroclub.

The city has also four railway stations, with only the Mitre Railway terminus operating passenger trains to Retiro in Buenos Aires, with intermediate stops in Santiago del Estero and Santa Fe provinces amongst other stations. The other train station active is Belgrano Railway station, originally built by the Córdoba Central Railway and currently operated by freight company Trenes Argentinos Cargas y Logística.

Railway stations in San Martín de Tucumán:

| Name | Former company | Line | Status (passenger) | Current operator/s |
|---|---|---|---|---|
| Tucumán (Mitre) | Central Argentine | Mitre | Active | Trenes Argentinos, NCA |
| Tucumán (Belgrano) | Córdoba Central | Belgrano | Closed | TACyL |
| Tucumán (Central Norte) ^{1} | Central Northern | Belgrano | Closed (1977) | — |
| Tucumán (Noroeste) ^{2} | Argentine North Western | Belgrano | Closed (1978) | — |

Notes:

- ^{1} Also known as "El Bajo" station, the building is currently a Municipal unit.
- ^{2} The line was also known as "Provincial" before being acquired by the Cordoba Central Railway in 1899.

== Media ==
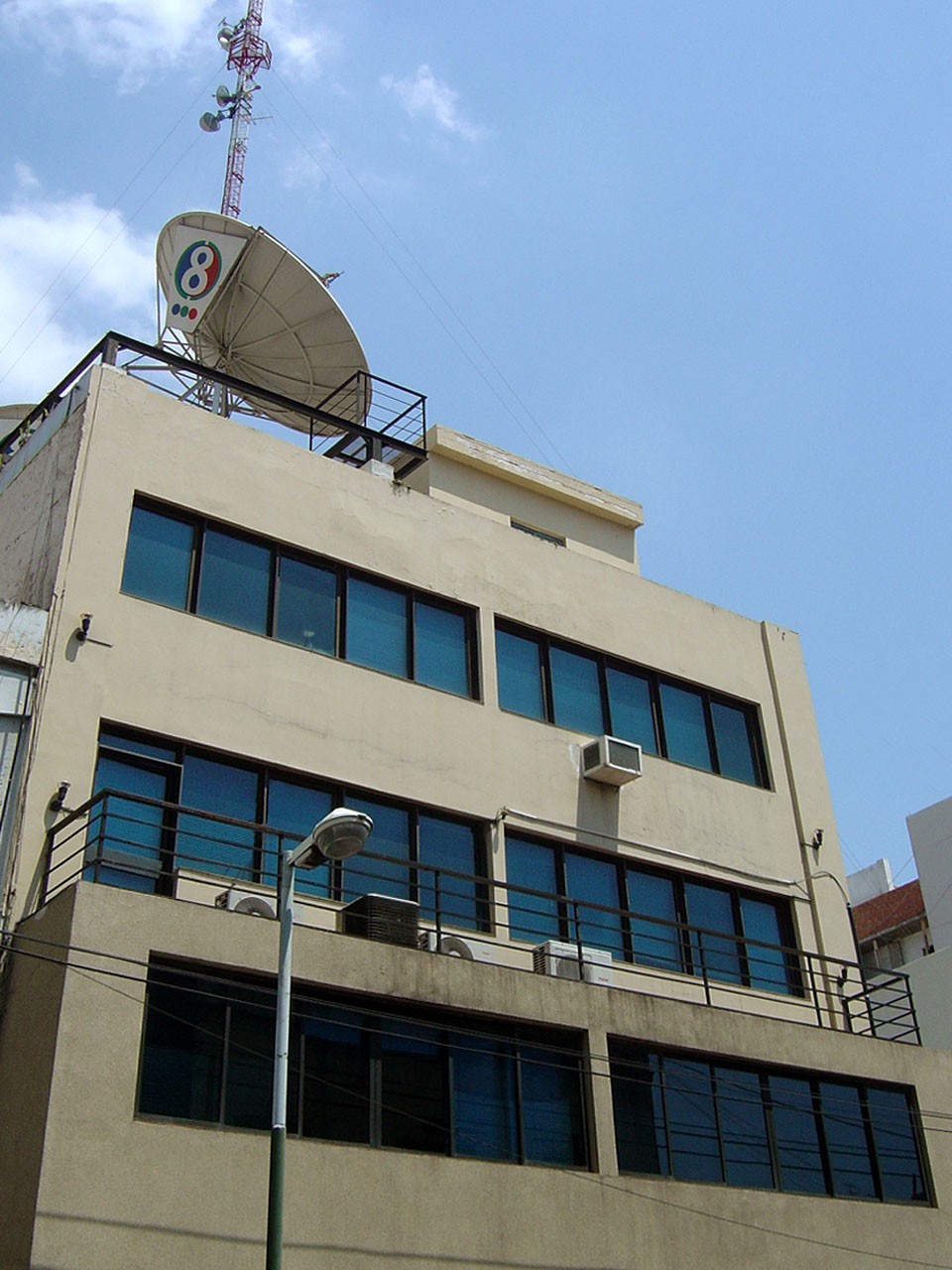
Channel 8 studios Tucumán.

San Miguel de Tucumán is home to two free-to-air television stations (Channel 8 and Channel 10), four newspapers (La Gaceta, El Siglo, El Periódico, El Tribuno de Tucumán), three cable television companies (CCC, ATS, and TCC), and several radio stations.

== Healthcare ==
San Miguel de Tucuman is part of the Provincial Health System (Sistema Provincial de Salud or SIPROSA). This system divided the Tucuman province into four systematic areas with San Miguel being in its own area. Each area has its own public hospitals and Health Primary Attention Centers for the people. This divisions purpose was to help regulate health care assistance across the population and make it more accessible. Since then, SIPROSA has been a part of a modernizing program with the government in trying to make a successful medical records system. This would collect data from all the different resources and compile it into one database making it a lot easier and quicker for patients to pull up medical history, medical records, or anything of that nature. This is a big step for the Tucuman region.

== Notable people ==
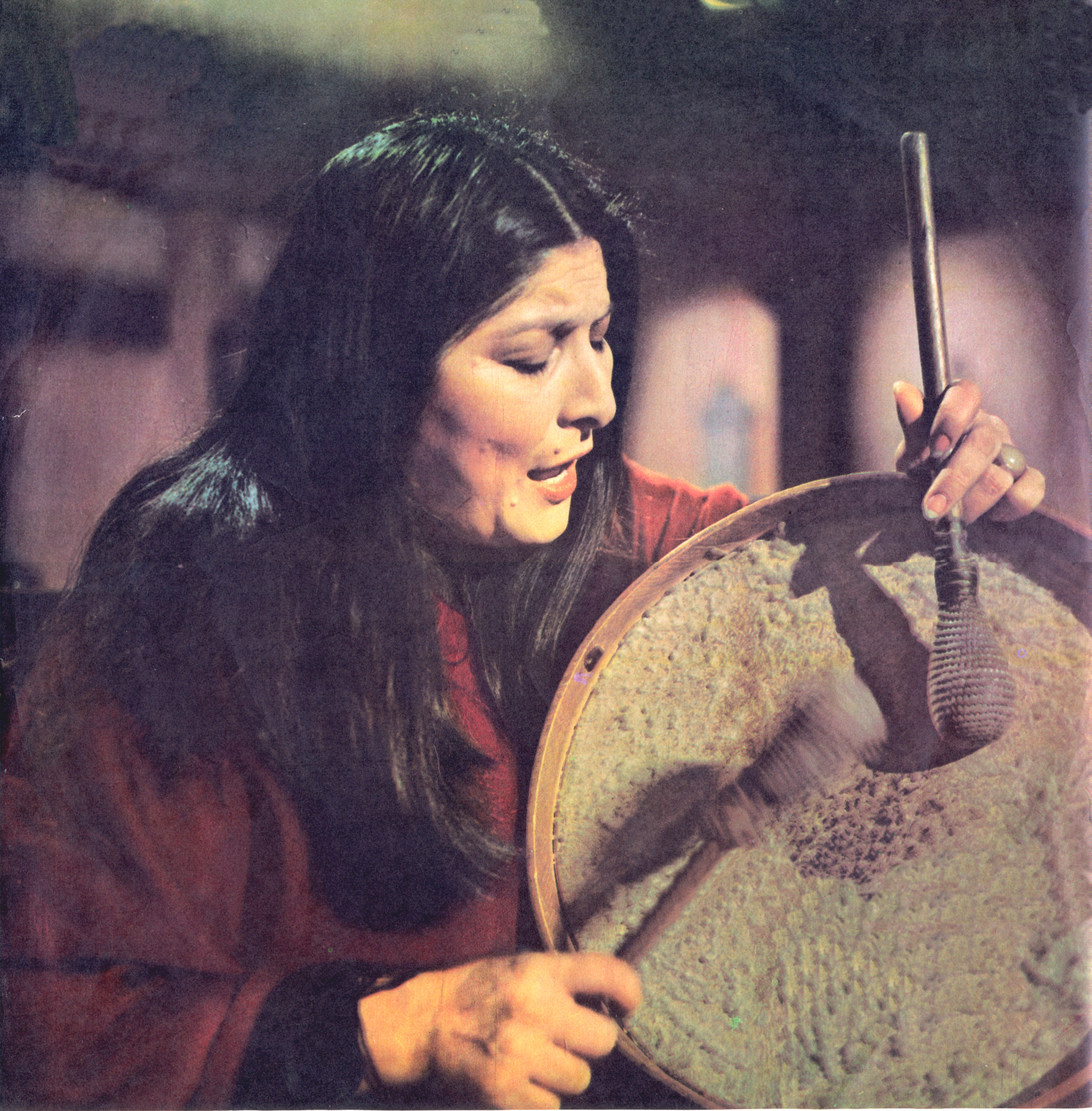
Mercedes Sosa

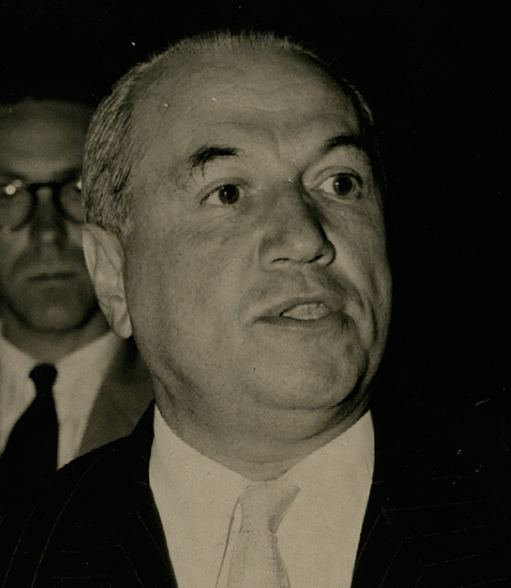
Raúl Prebisch

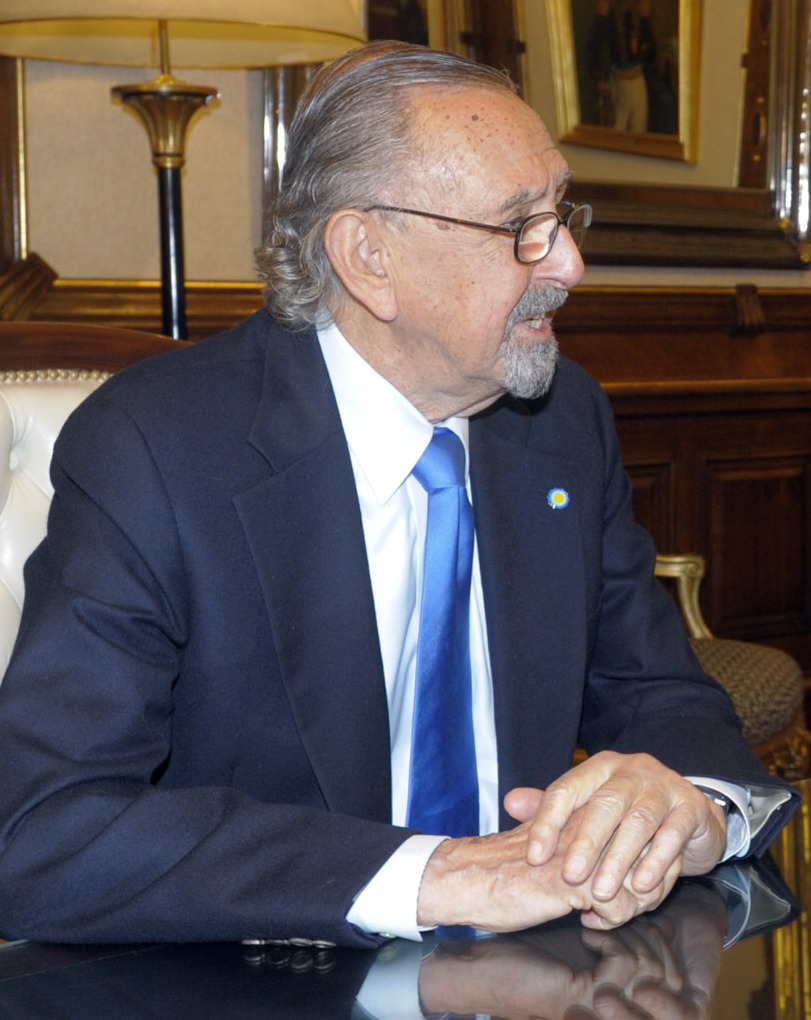
Cesar Pelli

- Melitón Camaño, politician and journalist
- Pablo Rodriguez, politician
- Juan Bautista Alberdi, lawyer, writer, political theorist and diplomat
- Carlos Alvarado-Larroucau, writer
- Gregorio Aráoz de Lamadrid
- Nicolás Avellaneda former President of Argentina
- Juliette Elmir, Lebanese nurse and political activist
- Franco Fagioli opera singer
- Victor García, theatre director.
- Omar Hasan, rugby player
- Daniel Hourcade, former international rugby player, Pumas head coach
- Francisco Maldonado da Silva, Jewish martyr
- Tomás Eloy Martínez, journalist and writer, author of Santa Evita
- Richard Maury, American engineer, honorary professor of the National University
- Lola Mora, sculptor
- José Luis Palomino (born 1990), professional footballer
- Mercedes María Paz, tennis player
- César Pelli, architect
- Alfredo Poviña, sociologist.
- Raúl Prebisch, economist, one of the founders of ECLAC-UN
- Ana Falú, architect and a social activist for human rights and for women's rights
- José María Núñez Piossek, former international/professional rugby player
- Olijela del Valle Rivas, politician
- Julio A. Roca, former President of Argentina
- Alejandro Romay, television and theatre producer
- Federico Nicolás Sánchez, rugby player
- Juan Soler, actor
- Mercedes Sosa, folk music singer
- Leda Valladares (1919–2012), folk singer and ethnographer of Argentine folk music

== Gallery ==
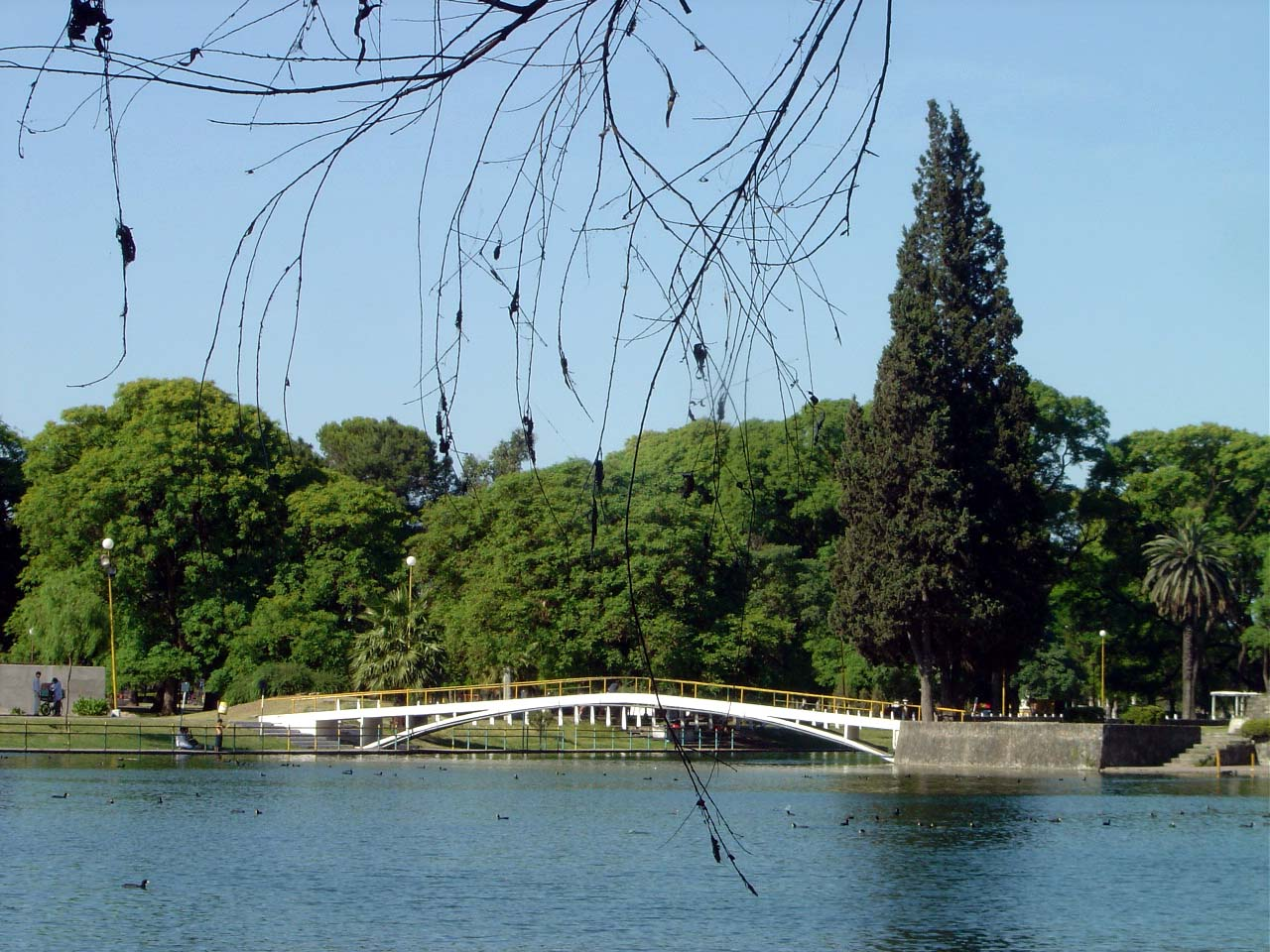
9 de Julio Park

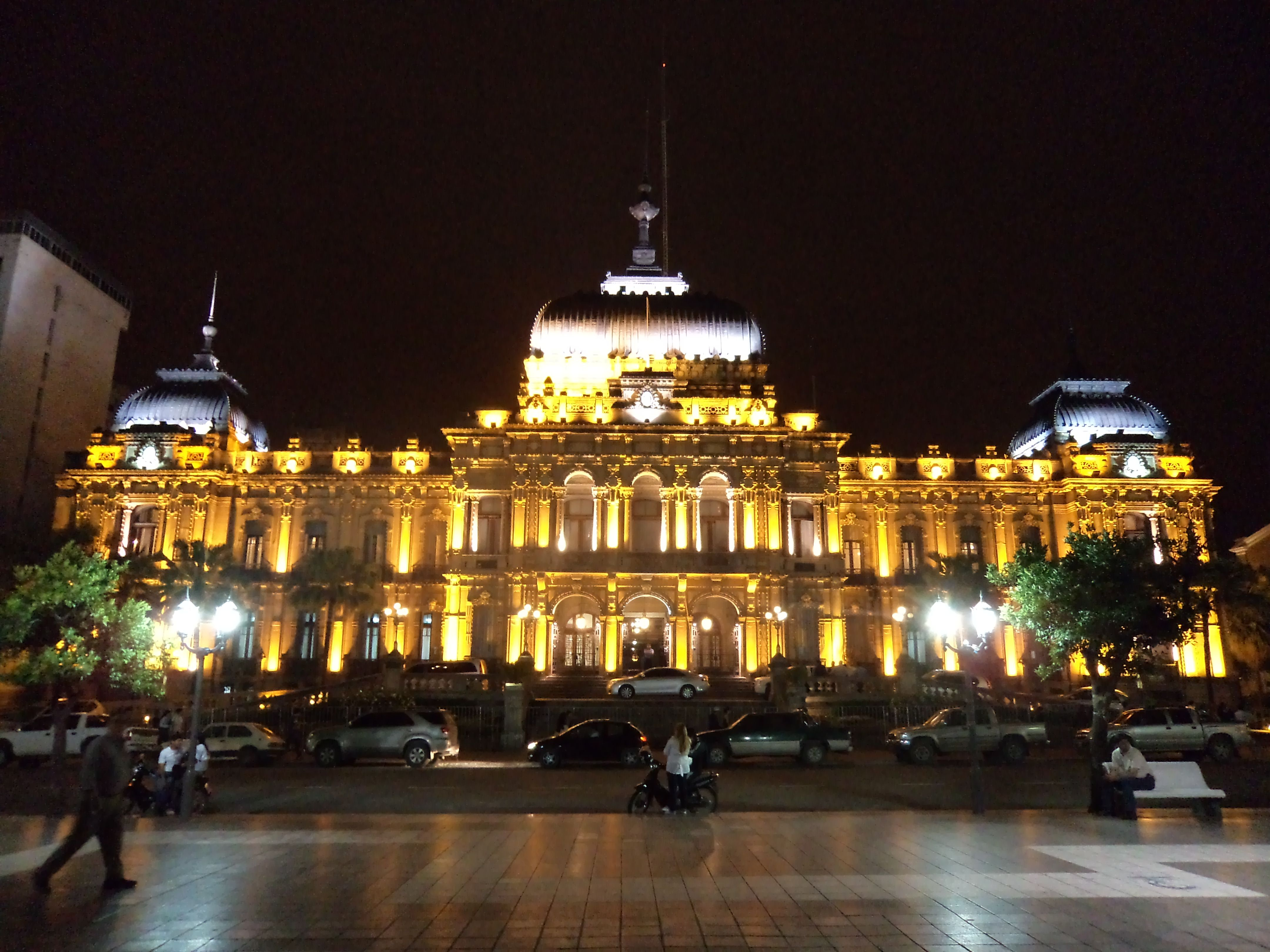
House of Government

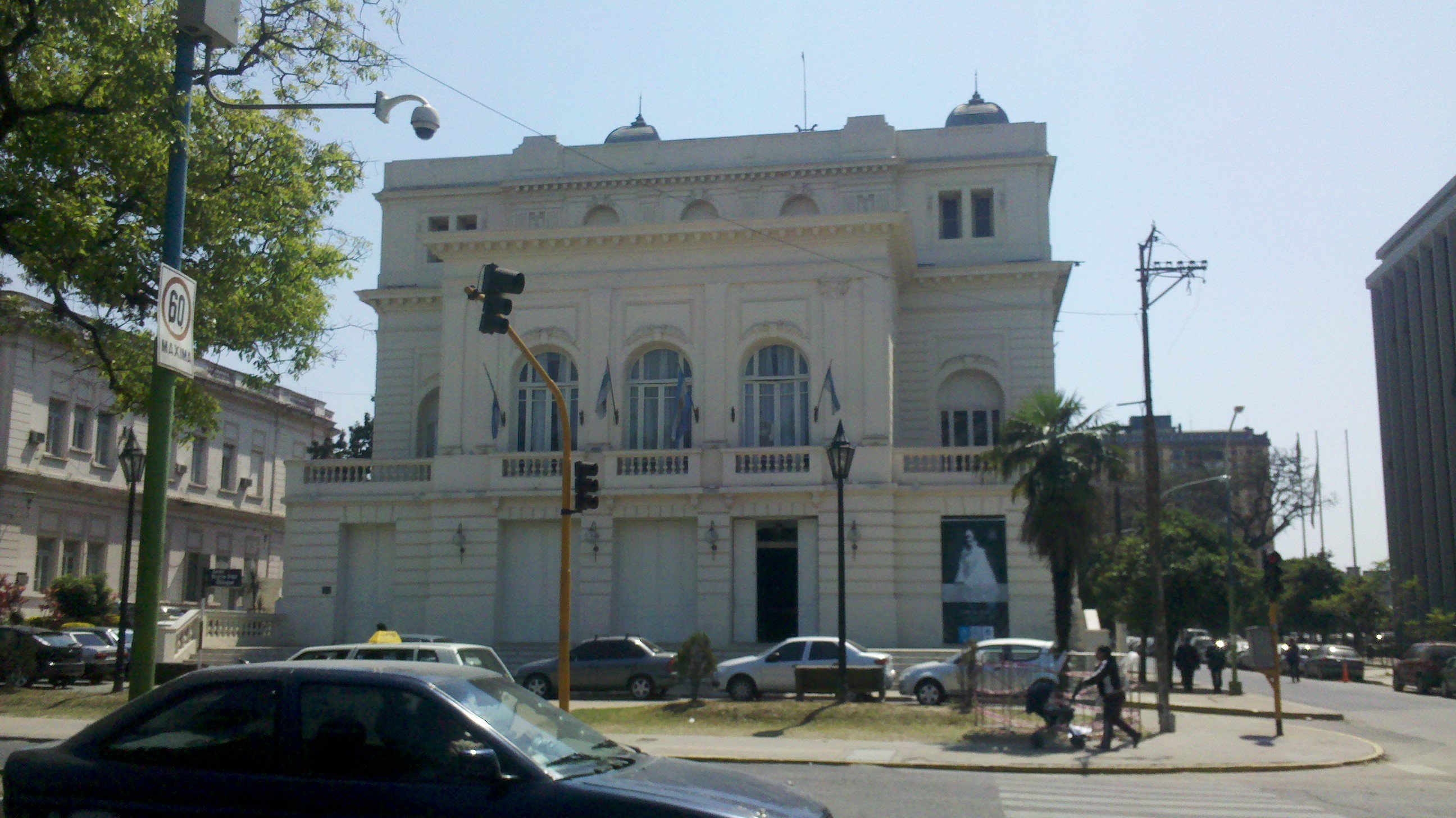
San Martín Teathre

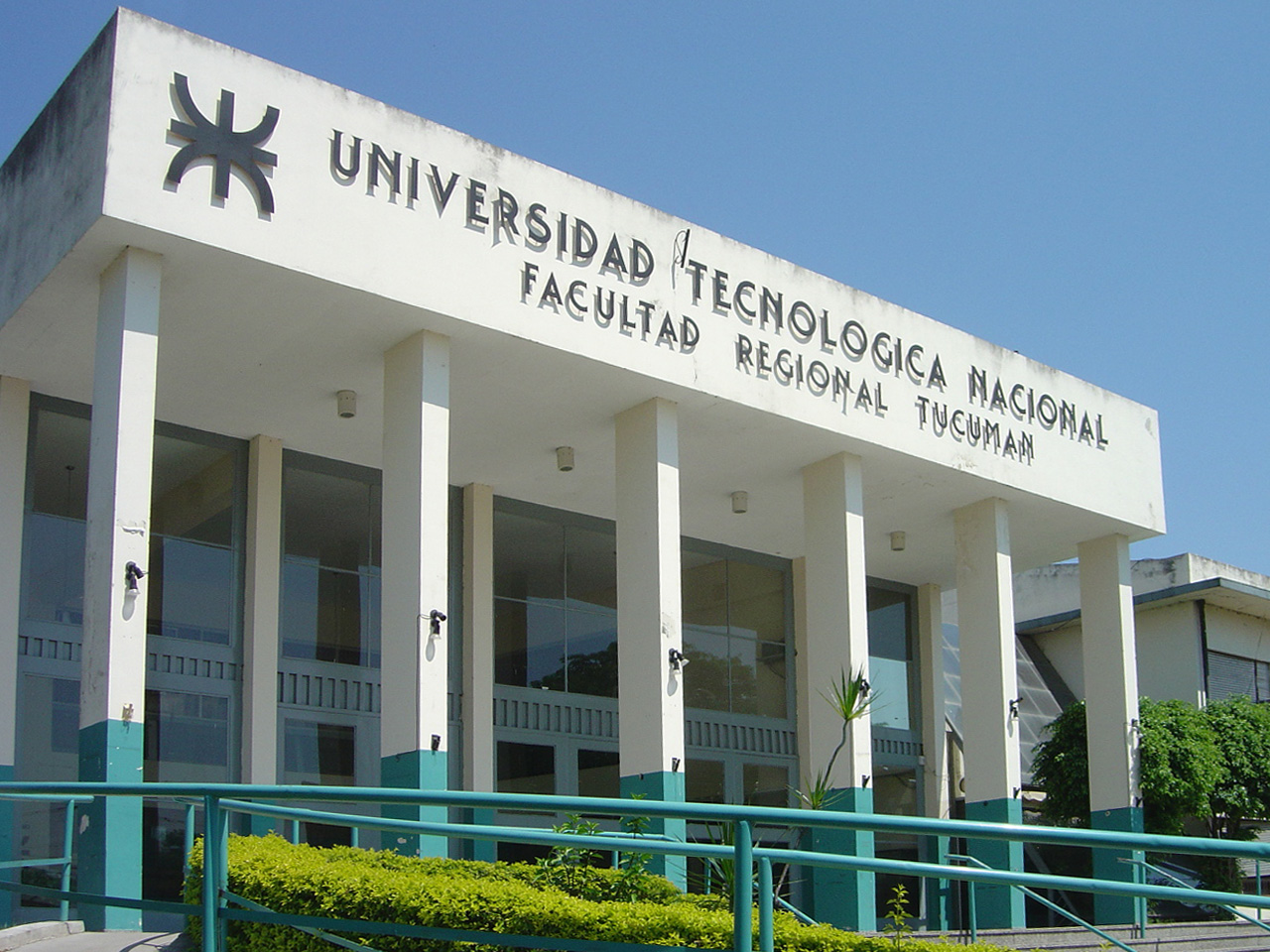
National Technology University

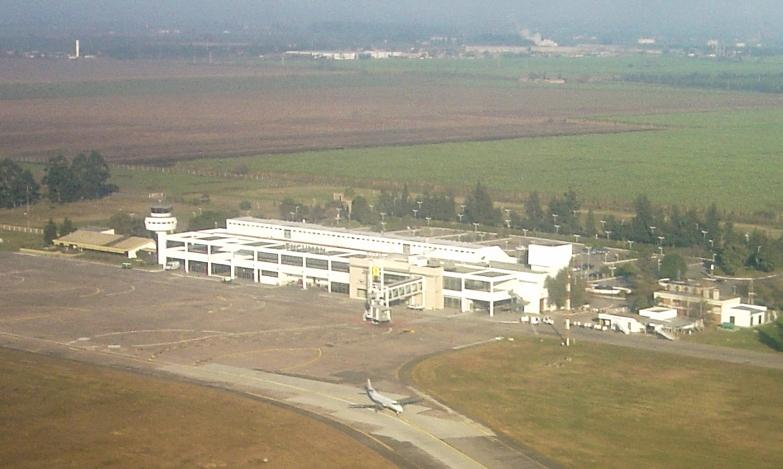
Benjamín Matienzo international airport

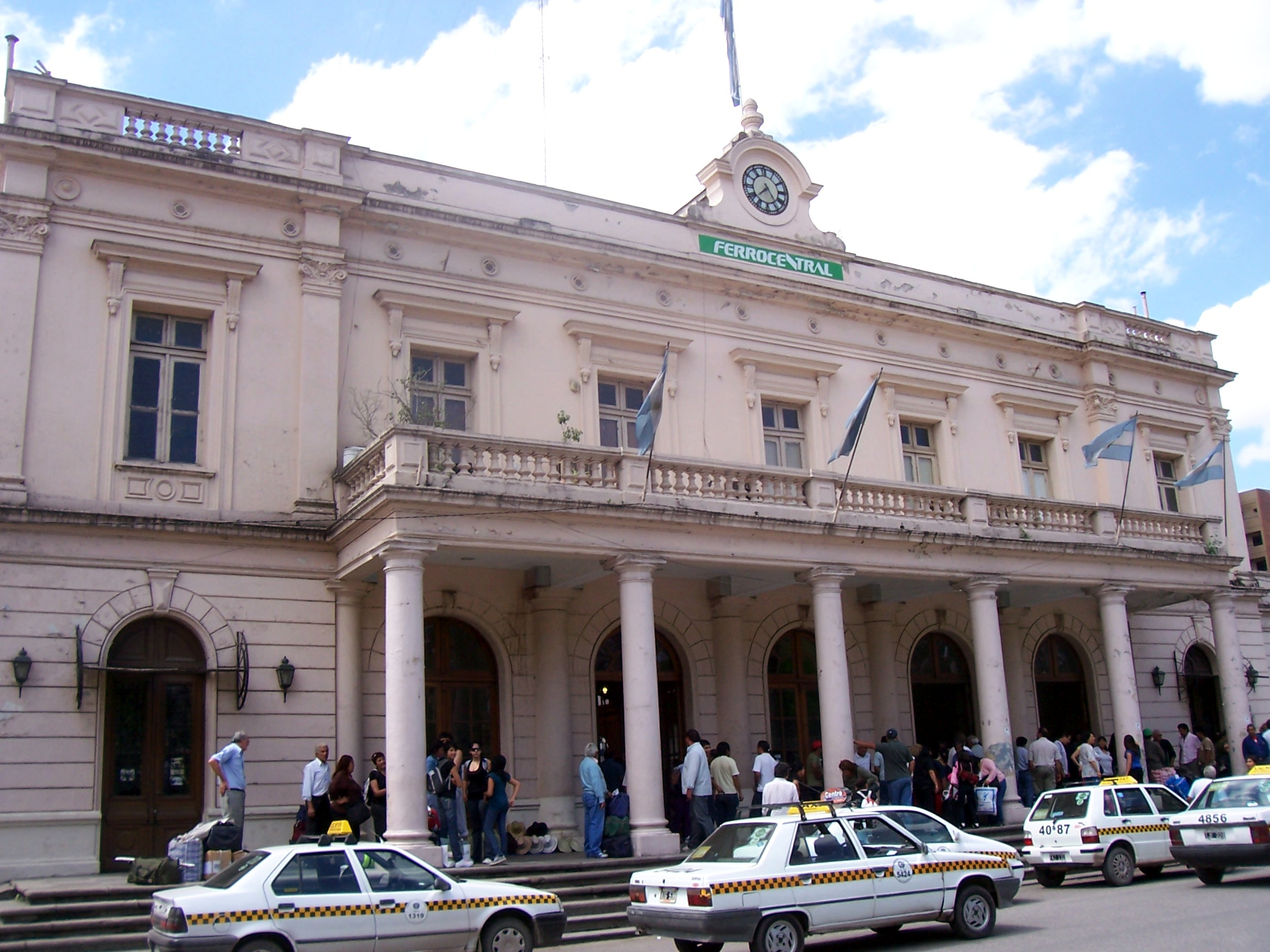
Mitre Railway station

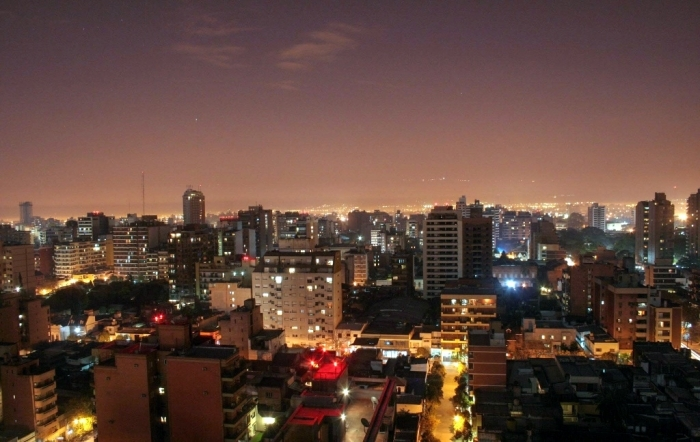
City at night

== Twin towns – sister cities ==
San Miguel de Tucumán is twinned with:

- Concepción, Chile
- Erfurt, Germany
- Nof HaGalil, Israel
- Sucre, Bolivia
- Santa Cruz de la Sierra, Bolivia
- New Orleans, United States of America
