= Yerba Buena, Tucumán =

Yerba Buena
- City
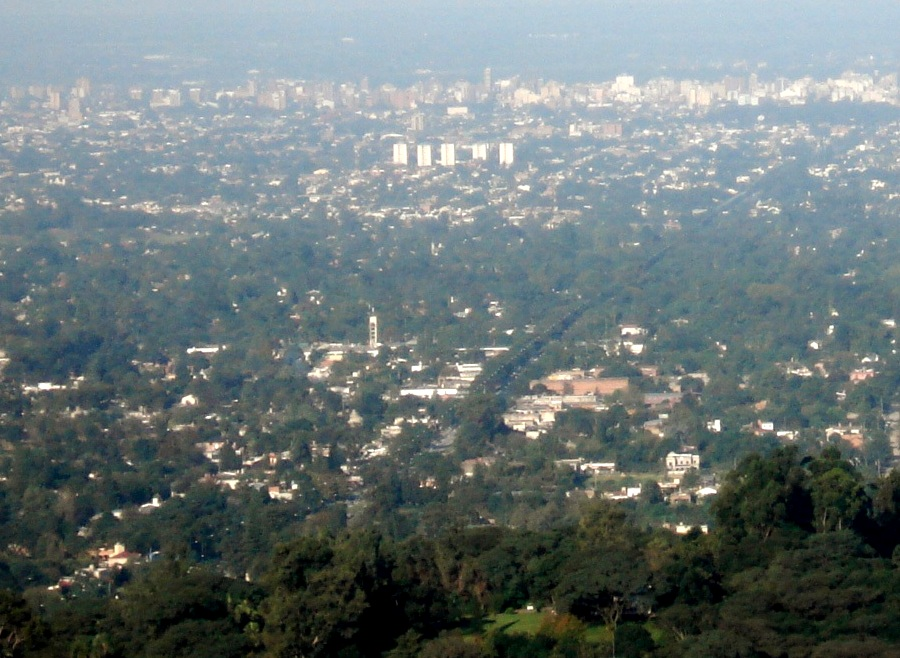
- Aerial view of Yerba Buena.

- Location of Yerba Buena in Argentina
- Coordinates: 26°49′S 65°19′W
- Country: Argentina
- Province: Tucumán
- Department: Yerba Buena

Government
  - Intendant: Pablo Macchiarola (UCR)
- Elevation: 466 m (1,529 ft)

Population (2001 census)
  - Total: 50,057
- Demonym: yerbabuenense
- Time zone: UTC−3 (ART)
- CPA base: T4107
- Dialing code: +54 381

Yerba Buena is the capital of the Yerba Buena Department in the province of Tucumán, Argentina. It is located at an altitude of around 466 metres (1528 feet).

The city of Yerba Buena is the most urbanized area of the department. It is mostly residential, although commercial activity has increased along its main road (Aconquija Avenue) with different kind of shops, shopping arcades, restaurants, bars and cafés. The main avenue has is lively, especially on weekends, when yerbabuenenses and people from its neighboring cities gather in search of fun and relaxation.

Yerba Buena is home to most of the country clubs and gated communities in the province, although there are slums scattered around the city.

Yerba Buena is a city, possibly given its name because people there may be friendly. There is a place called San Javier in the mountains nearby where there is a large cross called "El Cristo" (The Christ). Yerba Buena has experienced more growth than any other Argentine city since 1996 with an average of two residences per day being constructed.

== Transportation ==
Because of being so close to San Miguel de Tucumán, Yerba Buena's only access is through Tucumán. Bus lines # 100, 102 and 118 embark every 5 minutes from San Miguel to Yerba Buena. Taxi services are also available. Yerba Buena has its own airport (Mauricio Gilli Aerodrome) for light and private aviation.

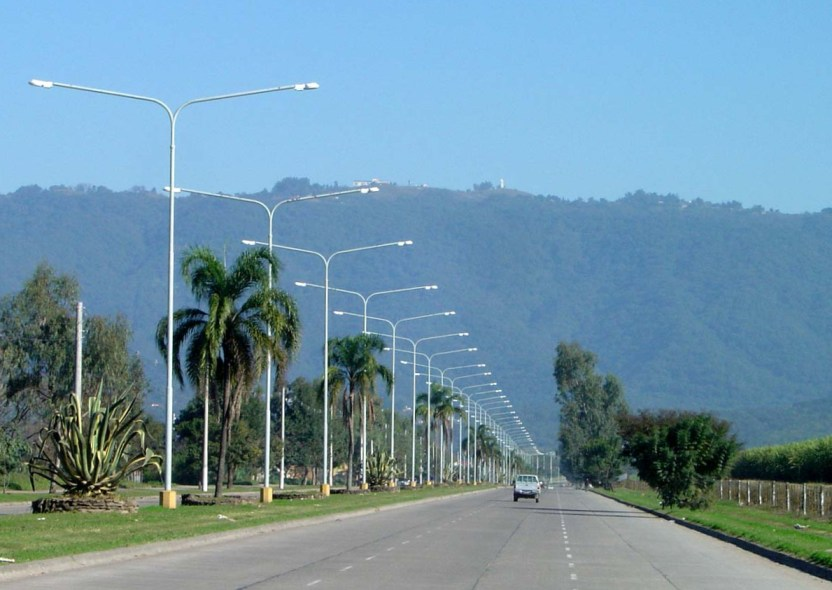
Yerba Buena (Tucumán): President Perón Ave. and the San Javier Hill.

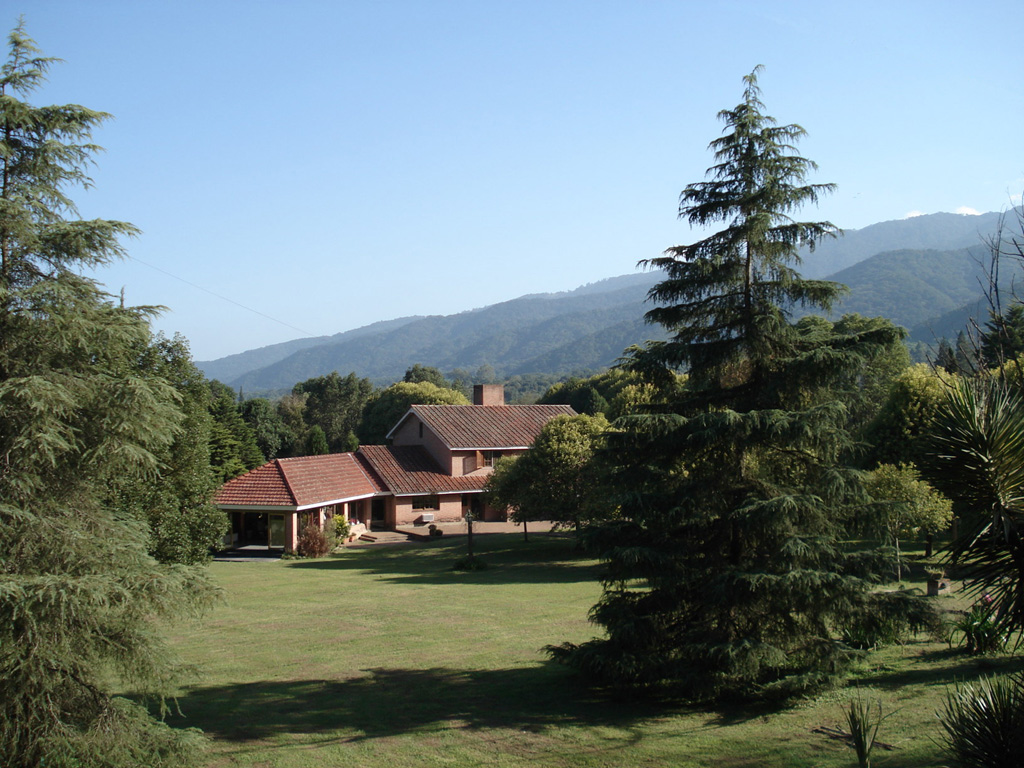
Suburban home, El Corte, Yerba Buena.

== Sister city ==
Yerba Buena has one sister city:

- Asunción, Paraguay

== See also ==
- Yerba buena (Literally translated means "good herb")
