= Tucumán Belgrano railway station =

Railway station in San Miguel de Tucumán, Argentina

Tucumán
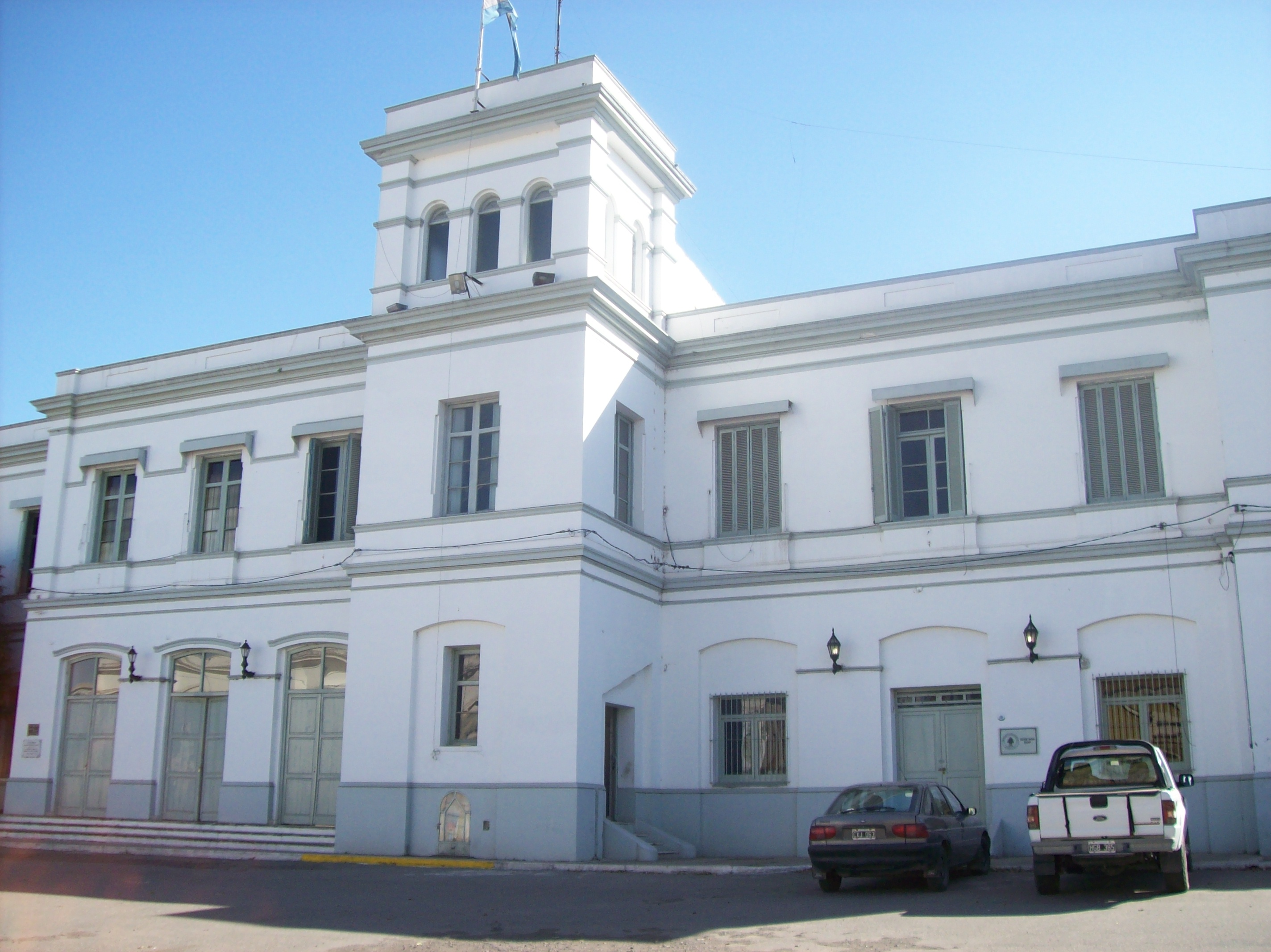
- Facade of the station in 2010

General information
- Location: Calle Marco Avellaneda y San Martín, San Miguel de Tucumán; Argentina
- Coordinates: 26.827394°S 65.215554°W
- System: Inter-city rail
- Owner: Government of Argentina
- Operator: Córdoba Central Railway (1876–1948); Ferrocarriles Argentinos (1948–1993)
- Line: Belgrano
- Tracks: 9

Construction
- Platform levels: 1

History
- Opened: October 1876
- Closed: March 1993; 33 years ago
Location

Tucumán is a former railway station in the city of San Miguel de Tucumán of Tucumán Province, Argentina.

The station was originally built and operated by the Córdoba Central Railway and then added to Belgrano Railway network. State-owned company Trenes Argentinos Cargas runs freight services on the line, but the station is no longer operational.

== History ==
The Córdoba Central Railway was founded in 1887 to take over a concession, originally granted to William Temple in 1885, for the construction of a 206 km line, from the Córdoba city suburb of Alta Córdoba to San Francisco. In October 1887 the Government granted the operation of Ferrocarril Central Norte's 884 km line (that included the Alta Córdoba-Tucumán, Frías-Santiago del Estero and Recreo-Chubicha branches) to Hume Hnos. & Cía (owned by The Hume Brothers) for $ 16,000,000.

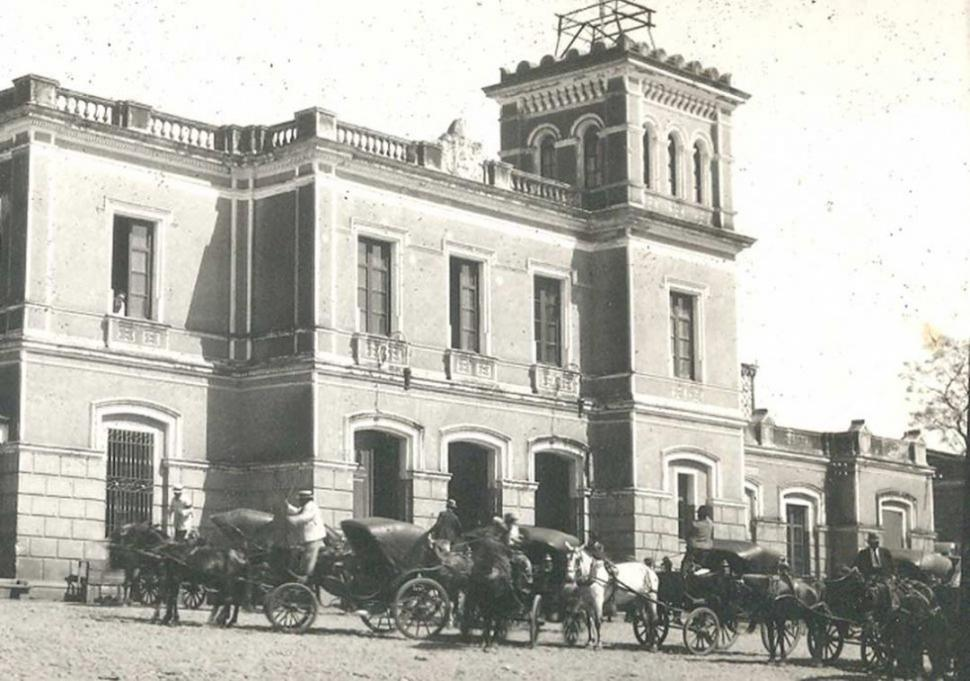
The station, c. 1890

The Tucumán CC station was the first railway station in the province, placed on the corner of San Martín and Marco Avellaneda streets, being designed by French architect Clodomiro Hidelet and opened to public in October 1876.

After the entire railway network was nationalised during Juan Perón's administration, the station started to be operated by recently formed Ferrocarriles Argentinos. The station remained active as an intermediate stop for trains run by Belgrano Railway to La Quiaca in Jujuy Province. The other station in the city for passenger trains was Tucumán N. (for Central Northern Railway, also transferred to Belgrano Railway in 1948).

In early 1990s, when the Carlos Menem's administration privatised all the railway services, the Belgrano Railway freight service remained under the control of the state due to lack of interest from private inversors. Nevertheless, the railway would be granted to Belgrano Cargas S.A., a consortium established by railway union "Unión Ferroviaria" in 1999. On the other hand, all the long-distance passenger services were closed in March 1993 so the station has remained active for freight trains exclusively since then.

In 2008, the Government of Argentina ceased the concession granted to Belgrano Cargas S.A. to operate the 7,347 km. of Belgrano Railway's freight network. A new company, "Belgrano Cargas y Logística", was established in May 2013 by National decree, to take over Belgrano's freight services, formerly operated by Belgrano Cargas. In June that same year the company also took over some services from Urquiza (2,704 km) and San Martín (5,254 km) railways.

The station building was remodeled in 2009, after a project to bring back a service between San Miguel de Tucumán and Tafí Viejo, although it was never reestablished.

=== Operators ===
Company	Period
(United Kingdom) Córdoba Central Railway	1876–1948
(Argentina) Ferrocarriles Argentinos	1948–1993
