= Mauricio Gilli Aerodrome =

Airport in Argentina

Mauricio Gilli Aerodrome Horco Molle Aeroclub Airport
- IATA: none; ICAO: none; LID: TCM

Summary
- Airport type: Public
- Serves: Yerba Buena, Argentina
- Elevation AMSL: 1,902 ft (580 m)
- Coordinates: 26°47′45″S 65°18′35″W

Map
- Location of airport in Argentina

Runways
Direction	Length		Surface
Direction	m	ft	Surface
11/29	750	2,461	Grass

Helipads
Number	Length		Surface
Number	m	ft	Surface
H1	12	39	Asphalt
- Source: AIM FallingRain WAC

Mauricio Gilli Aerodrome (Spanish: Aeródromo Mauricio Gilli – Tucumán) is an airport serving Yerba Buena, a western suburb of Tucumán in the Tucumán Province of Argentina. It is commonly known as Aeroclub Tucumán. The main airport of Tucumán is the Teniente General Benjamín Matienzo International Airport, 20 kilometres (12 mi) to the east.

The airport is on the northern side of Yerba Buena, and is used for light aviation, flight training, and radio-controlled aircraft. Rising terrain west of the airport requires approach and departures to be conducted to the east. There are an additional 250 metres (820 ft) of grass overrun on the west end of the runway.

== See also ==
- Transport in Argentina
- List of airports in Argentina
