= Argentine North Western Railway =

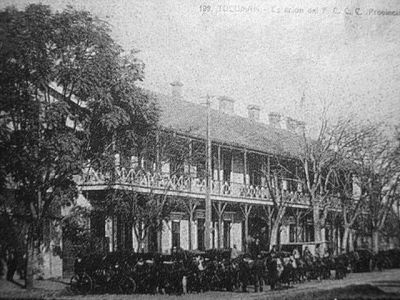
- Tucumán station, 1890s.

Overview
- Native name: Ferrocarril Noroeste Argentino
- Status: Defunct company; rail line active
- Locale: Tucumán Province
- Termini: S.M. de Tucumán

Service
- Type: Inter-city

History
- Opened: 1889
- Closed: 1899; 127 years ago (acquired by Córdoba Central Railway)

Technical
- Track gauge: 1,000 mm (3 ft 3 3/8 in)

The Argentine North Western Railway (ANW) (in Spanish: Ferrocarril Noroeste Argentino) was a British-owned railway company, founded in 1886, that operated a 1,000 mm (3 ft 3 3/8 in) metre gauge railway network in the Tucumán Province of Argentina. The company was sold to the British-owned Córdoba Central Railway (CC) in 1899.

== History ==
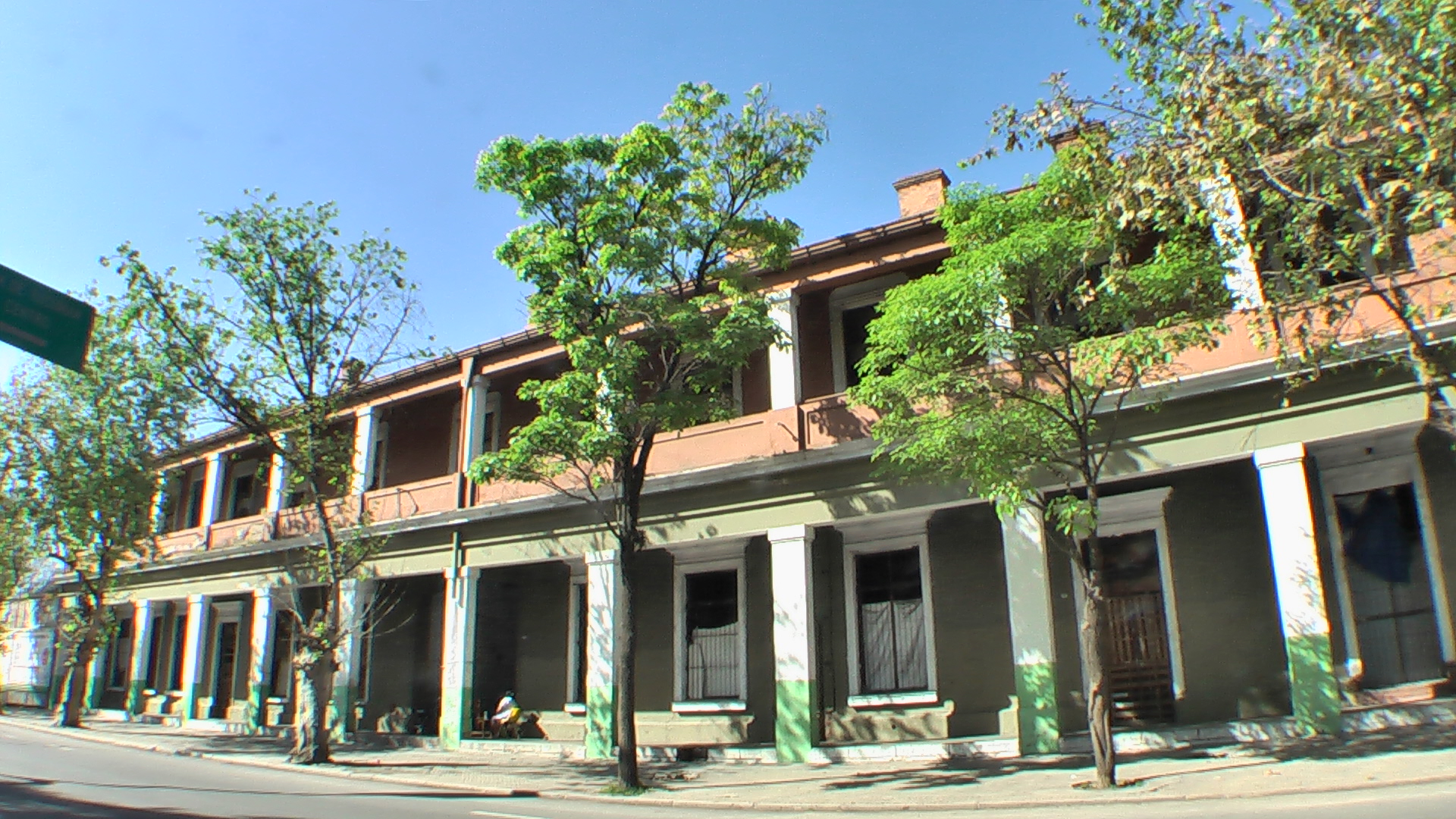
Tucumán station in 2012.

The company was founded in 1886 to acquire a concession, granted to Samuel Kelton in 1885 by the provincial government of Tucumán, for the construction of a 142-km line from Tucumán south to La Madrid, and for the building of 35 km of branch lines, including one from Concepción to Medinas, in the sugar growing region of the province.

The line from Tucumán to La Madrid was completed in September 1889. It would be also known El Provincial due to it only run within Tucumán Province. Nevertheless, the financial situation of the company deteriorated until in 1899 (ten years after of being inaugurated) the ANWR was sold to the Córdoba Central Railway.

== See also ==
- Córdoba Central Railway
- General Belgrano Railway
