= Córdoba Central Railway =

British-owned railway company

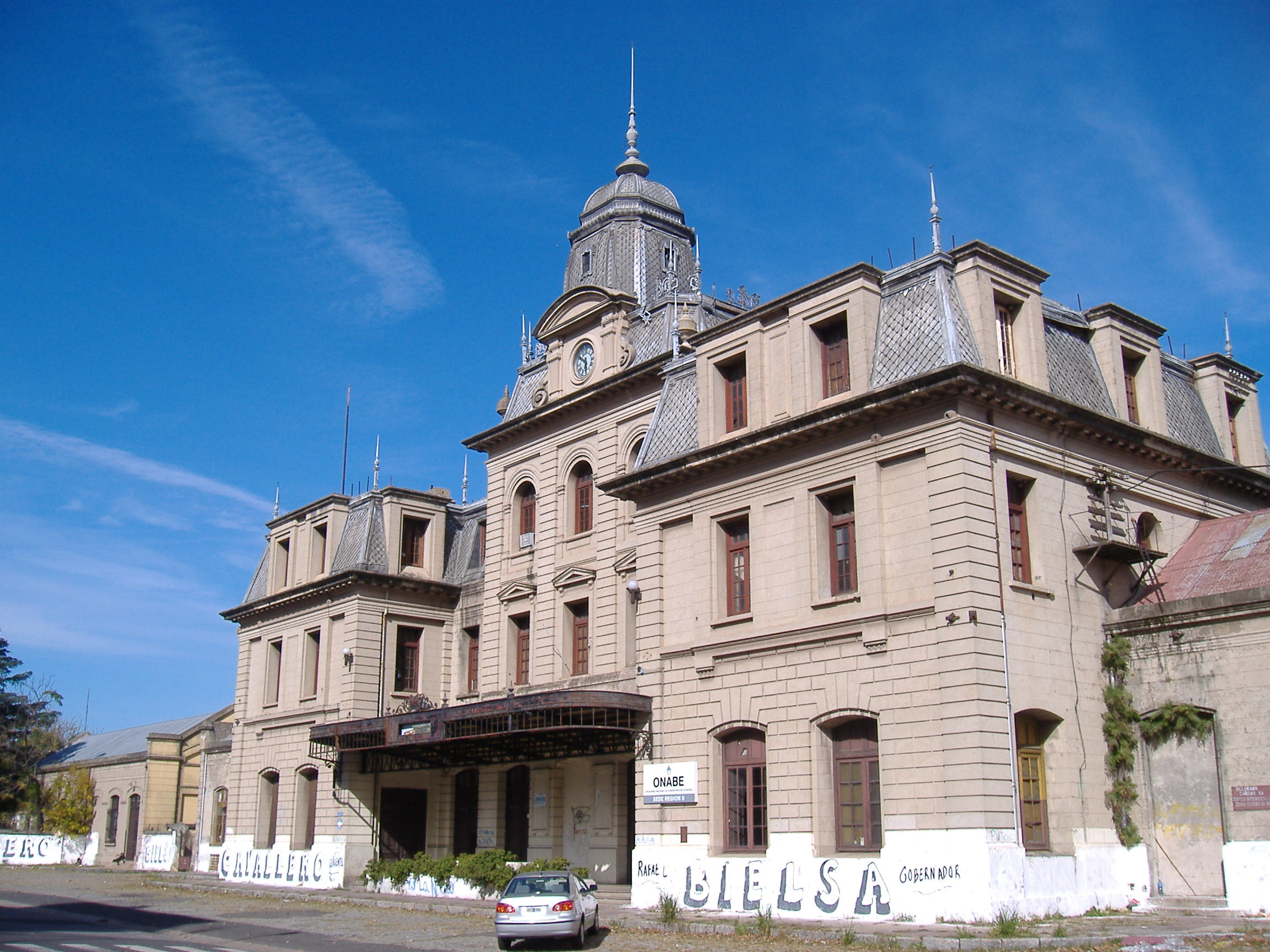
- Rosario (CC) station.

Overview
- Native name: Ferrocarril Central Córdoba
- Status: Defunct company; rail lines active
- Termini: Retiro; Tucumán
- Stations: Santa Fe; Córdoba; Santiago del Estero; Catamarca

Service
- Type: Inter-city

History
- Opened: 1888
- Closed: 1939; 86 years ago (acquired by the Argentine State Railway)

Technical
- Track gauge: 1,000 mm (3 ft 3 3/8 in) metre gauge
Route map
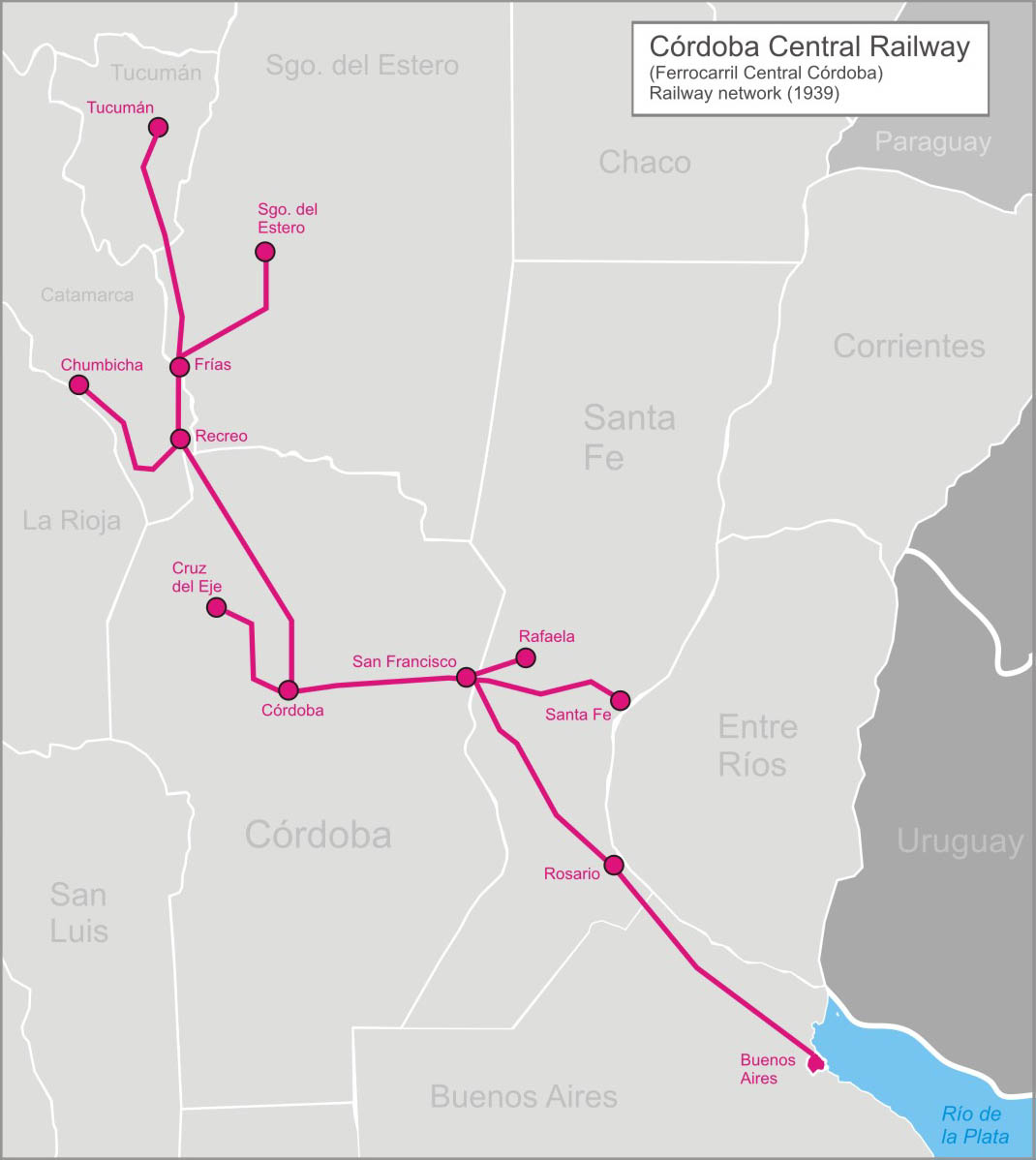

The Córdoba Central Railway (CCR) (in Spanish: Ferrocarril Central Córdoba) was a British-owned railway company, founded in 1887, that operated a 1,960 km (1,220 mi) 1,000 mm (3 ft 3 3/8 in) metre gauge railway network in Argentina which extended from Buenos Aires, north west via Rosario and Córdoba, to Tucumán. Financial problems forced the sale of the company to the Government of Argentina in 1938.

With the railway nationalisation in Argentina in 1948, the CCR became part of Belgrano Railway.

== History ==
=== Beginning ===
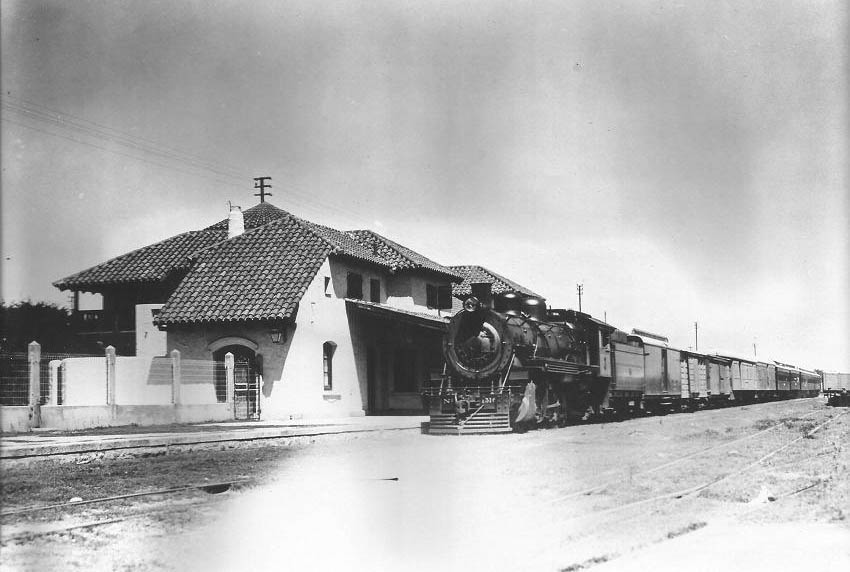
A steam locomotive at Valle Hermoso train station.

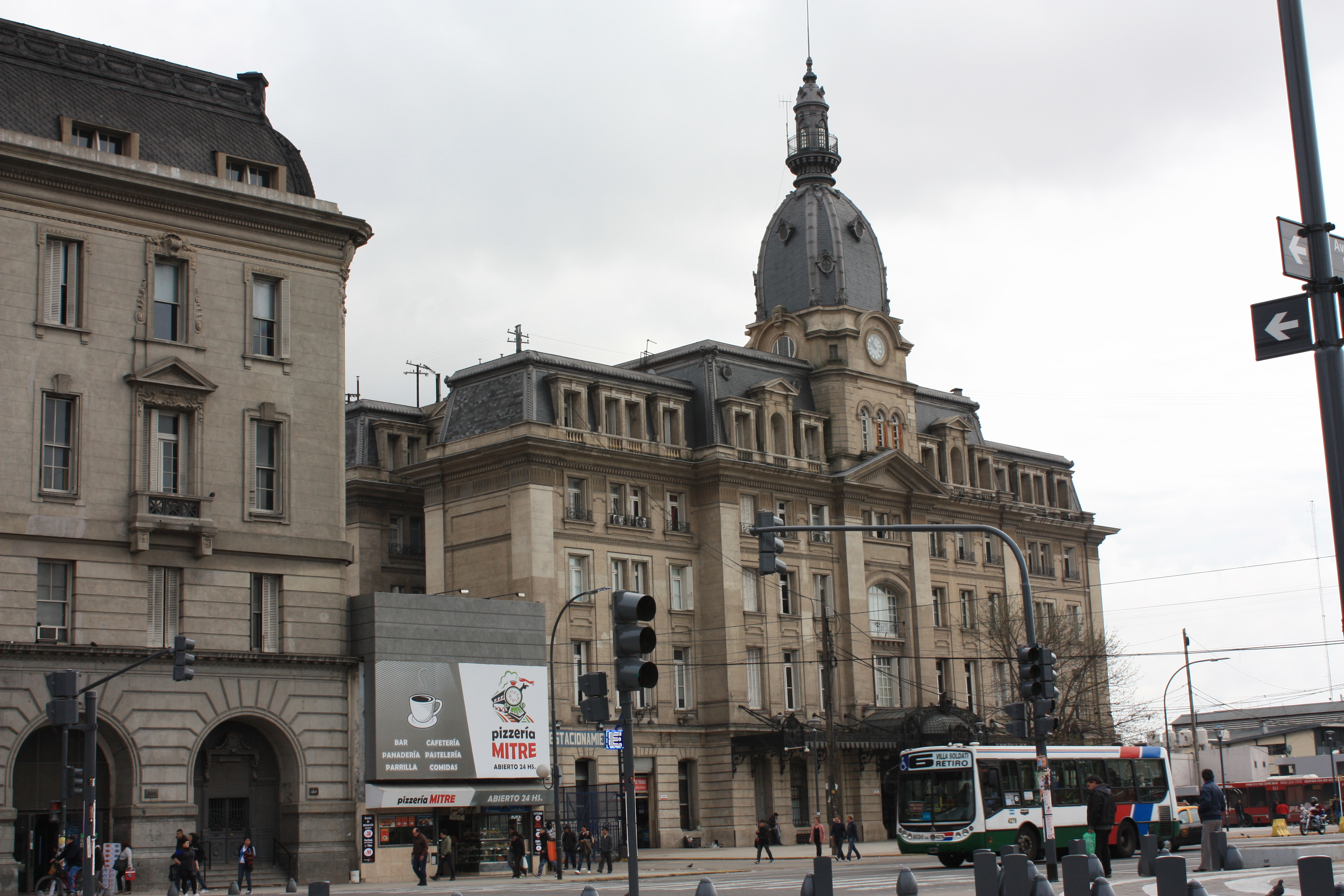
Retiro station, currently terminus of Belgrano Norte Line operated by Ferrovías.

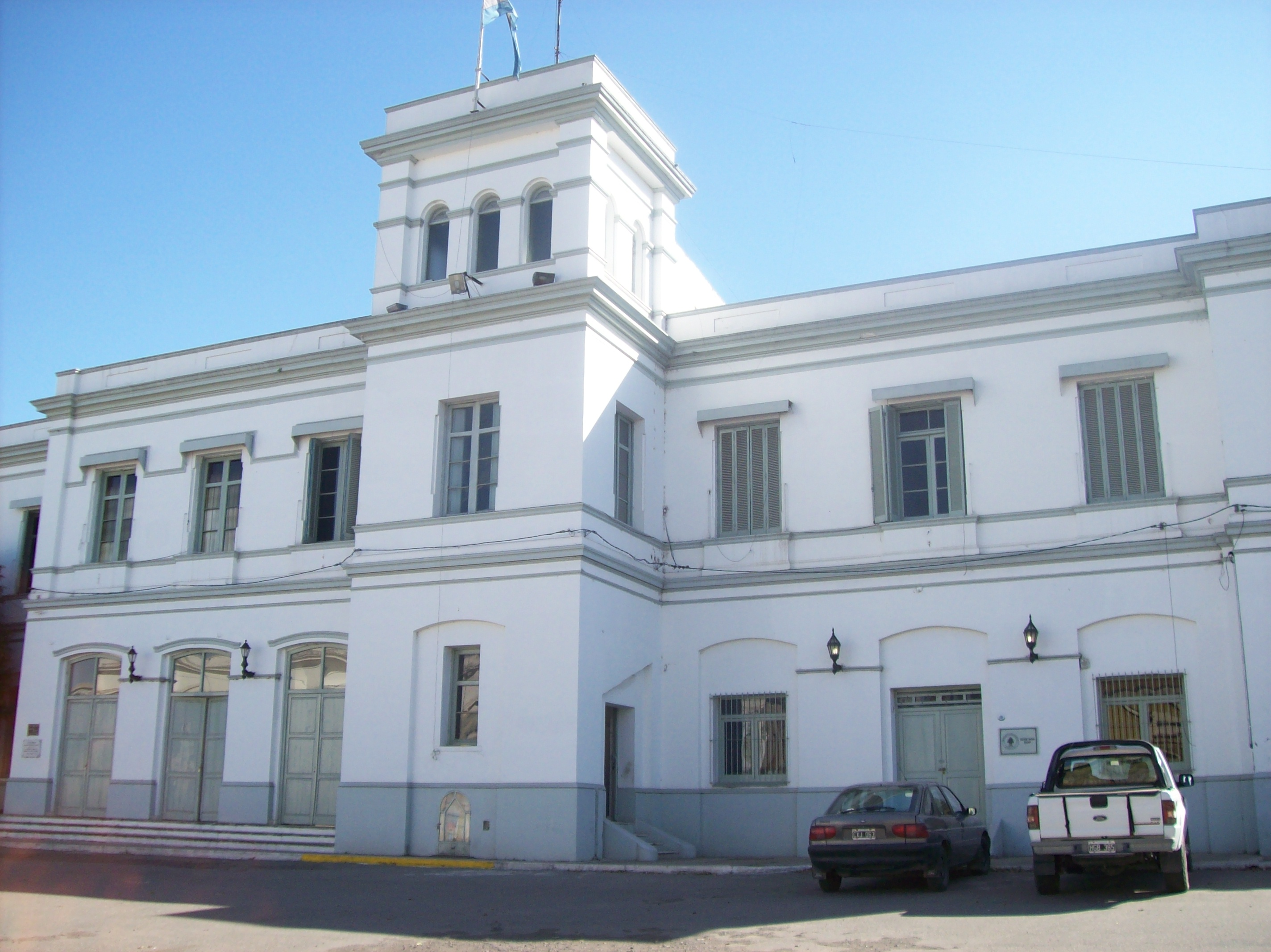
Tucumán station.

The company was founded in 1887 to take over a concession, originally granted to William Temple in 1885, for the construction of a 206 km line, from the Córdoba city suburb of Alta Córdoba to San Francisco. The line was completed in 1888

In October 1887 the Government granted the operation of Ferrocarril Central Norte's 884 km line (that included the Alta Córdoba-Tucumán, Frías-Santiago del Estero and Recreo-Chubicha branches) to Hume Hnos. & Cía (owned by The Hume Brothers) for $ 16,000,000. The concessionary would also invest $5,000,000 to bring it up to a satisfactory standard. The Government guaranteed Hume Hnos. a 5% of interest for 15 years. The Ferrocarril Central Norte only kept the Tucumán-Juramento 226 km. section. Hume Hnos. would then transfer their rights of operation to the Córdoba Central Railway in 1889.

Between 1889 and 1891 the Córdoba Central network was expanded with the addition of Tucumán-Lamadrid (140 km) and Argentine North Western Railway (284 km.). In 1891 Meiggs & Cía. transferred its assets to newly formed "Ferrocarril Córdoba y Rosario", established in London with a capital of $ 10,164,646.

In 1901 the company took over the operation of the British-owned Córdoba North Western Railway from Córdoba to Cruz del Eje, via La Calera and Cosquín. This railway had been built and operated by Otto Bemberg & Cía following the course of Río Primero. This branch is currently operated by Tren de las Sierras. The first section was opened in 1891, reaching Cosquín the following year.

In 1909 the Government of Argentina acquired the 155 km. line, being added to Central Northern Railway that same year.

=== Reaching Buenos Aires ===
In 1912 the Argentine government granted a concession to the CC to build a line connecting Rosario and Buenos Aires which was opened on 1 May 1912 and in October 1914 a new railway terminus was inaugurated at Retiro, Buenos Aires. In 1912 the CC took over another British-owned company, the Córdoba & Rosario Railway, with whom it had shared mutual interests for a number of years.

Severe rail and road competition lead to financial problems which eventually resulted in the sale of the CC to the Argentine government in May 1939 after which operation of its lines was taken over by the Argentine State Railway. With the railway nationalisation in 1948, the CC became part of Belgrano Railway network.

== Bibliography ==
- Lewis, Colin M. (1983). British Railways in Argentina 1857-1914: A Case Study of Foreign Investment'. Athlone Press (for the Institute of Latin American Studies, University of London).
- Stones, H.R. (1993). British Railways in Argentina 1860-1948. Bromley, Kent, England: P.E. Waters & Associates.
