= Retiro =

Retiro (Spanish for retirement or retreat) may refer to:

== Places ==
- Retiro, Antioquia, a municipality in Antioquia, Colombia
- Retiro, Buenos Aires, a neighbourhood in Buenos Aires, Argentina
  - Retiro bus station, the main bus terminal in Buenos Aires, Argentina
  - Retiro railway station, a railway station complex in Buenos Aires comprising:
    - Retiro (Line C Buenos Aires Underground)
    - Retiro (Line E Buenos Aires Underground)
    - Retiro Belgrano railway station, serving the Belgrano Norte Line and the General Manuel Belgrano Railway
    - Retiro Mitre railway station, serving the Mitre Line and the General Bartolomé Mitre Railway
    - Retiro San Martín railway station, serving the San Martín Line and the General San Martín Railway
- Retiro, Chile, a municipality in Chile
- Retiro (Madrid), a district in Madrid, Spain
  - Parque del Buen Retiro, a park in Madrid, Spain
  - Retiro (Madrid Metro), a station on Line 2
- Retiro, San Germán, Puerto Rico, a barrio
- Retiro Island (Brasília), an island in Lake Paranoá, Brazil

== Other uses ==
- Retiro (spider), a genus of spiders

== See also ==
- El Retiro (disambiguation)
