= Retiro station =

Retiro station may refer to:

== Buenos Aires, Argentina ==
- Retiro bus station, the main bus terminal
- Retiro railway station, a railway station complex, comprising:
  - Retiro (Line C Buenos Aires Underground)
  - Retiro (Line E Buenos Aires Underground)
  - Retiro Belgrano railway station, serving the Belgrano Norte Line and the General Manuel Belgrano Railway
  - Retiro Mitre railway station, serving the Mitre Line and the General Bartolomé Mitre Railway
  - Retiro San Martín railway station, serving the San Martín Line and the General San Martín Railway

== Spain ==
- Retiro (Madrid Metro), a railway station in Madrid
