= Retiro railway station =

Railway station in Buenos Aires, Argentina

Retiro
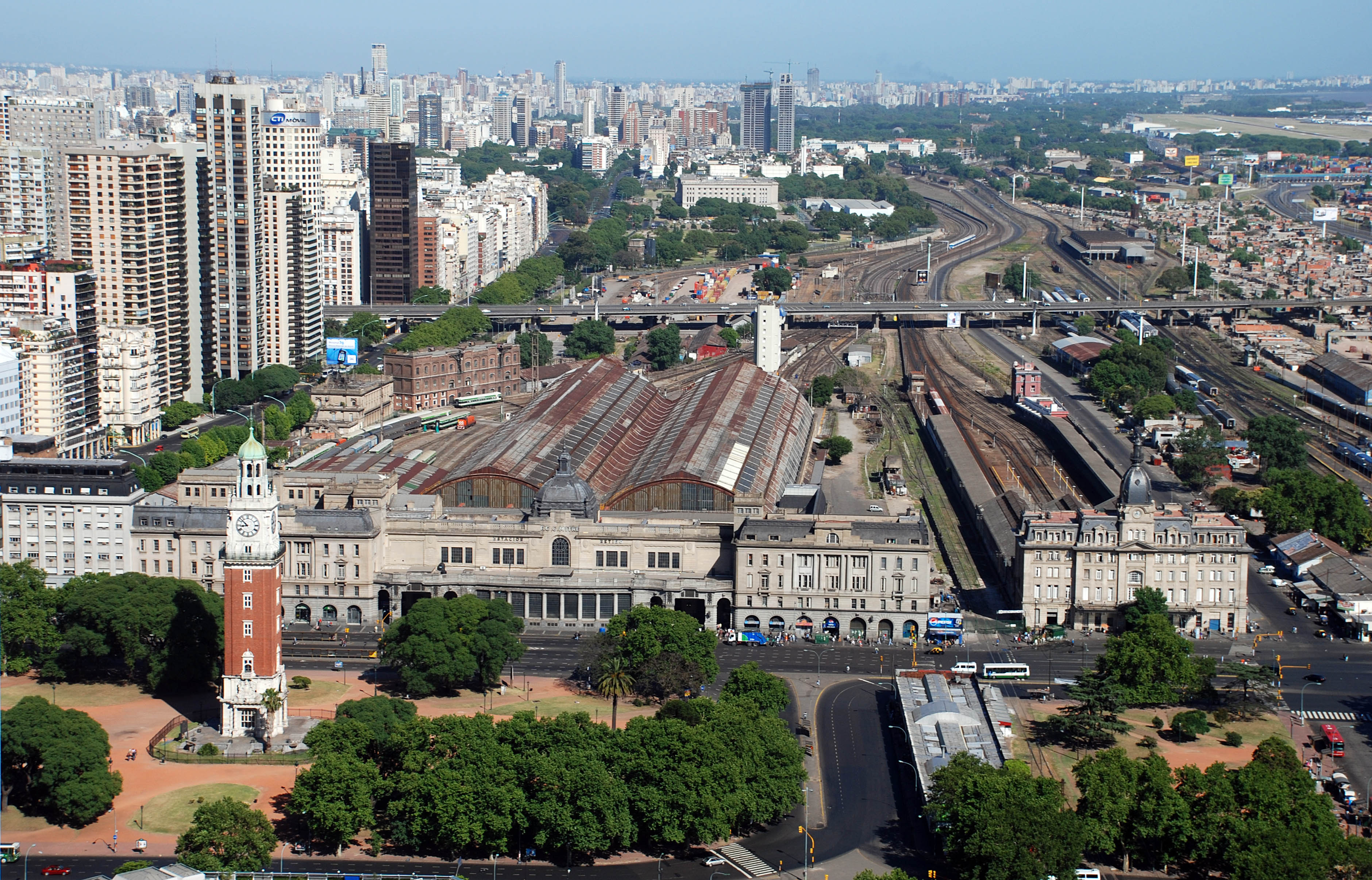
- Aerial view of the Retiro Mitre (center) and Retiro Belgrano (right); the platforms of Retiro San Martín are visible at the far right, the Torre Monumental is on the left

General information
- Location: Ramos Mejía Avenue, Buenos Aires, Argentina
- Coordinates: 34°35′29″S 58°22′29″W
- System: Inter-city & Commuter rails
- Owner: Government of Argentina
- Operator: Trenes Argentinos; Ferrovías
- Lines: Mitre; Belgrano; San Martín
- Platforms: 19
- Connections: Subte; Bus terminus

Other information
- Fare zone: Retiro, Buenos Aires

History
- Opened: August 1, 1915; 111 years ago
- Electrified: Mitre only
Location
- Location within Buenos Aires Location within Argentina

Retiro is a railway station complex in Buenos Aires, Argentina, that includes three main terminal train stations (Retiro-Mitre, Retiro-Belgrano and Retiro-San Martín) and the Retiro underground station complex.

The complex is named after the neighborhood where it is located, Retiro. It is close to Retiro Bus Terminal Station, the country's biggest bus terminal, and the Port of Buenos Aires.

== Overview ==
The stations are very close to the Retiro bus station (Terminal de Omnibus), the principal long-distance bus terminal in Buenos Aires. The complex is also accessible by lines C and E of the Buenos Aires Underground m and by numerous local public bus services. There are plans to add additional platforms to the underground station complex to serve lines G and H in addition to lines C and E of the underground.

The three stations are located opposite Plaza San Martín, a large park. Also close are ferry services to Uruguay and estuary, and cruise ship terminal.

== Services ==
=== Commuter rail ===
Retiro is the largest railway complex in Buenos Aires and more commuter trains arrive and depart from here than in any other station in the city. As of 2015, the following companies operate regular services to the suburbs of Buenos Aires along three principal lines:

- Mitre service calling at José León Suárez (General San Martín Partido), Tigre, and Bartolomé Mitre along its three branches. Long-distance services to Rosario and Tucumán cities. Both operated by Trenes Argentinos.
- Belgrano Norte service to Villa Rosa (Pilar Partido). Operated by private company Ferrovías.
- San Martín service calling at Villa Devoto, El Palomar, Caseros and Pilar, amongst others. Operated by Trenes Argentinos.

=== Long-distance ===
In addition to its status as the hub of an extensive commuter railway network, Retiro stations are also the terminus of a few long-distance passenger services which provide access to cities in the north and west of the country. As of 2015, state-owned Trenes Argentinos manages long-distance services to the cities of Córdoba, Tucumán and Rosario. Those services had been run by defunct company Ferrocentral.

From the Retiro San Martín station trains depart to Rufino station in Santa Fe Province.

== Gallery ==
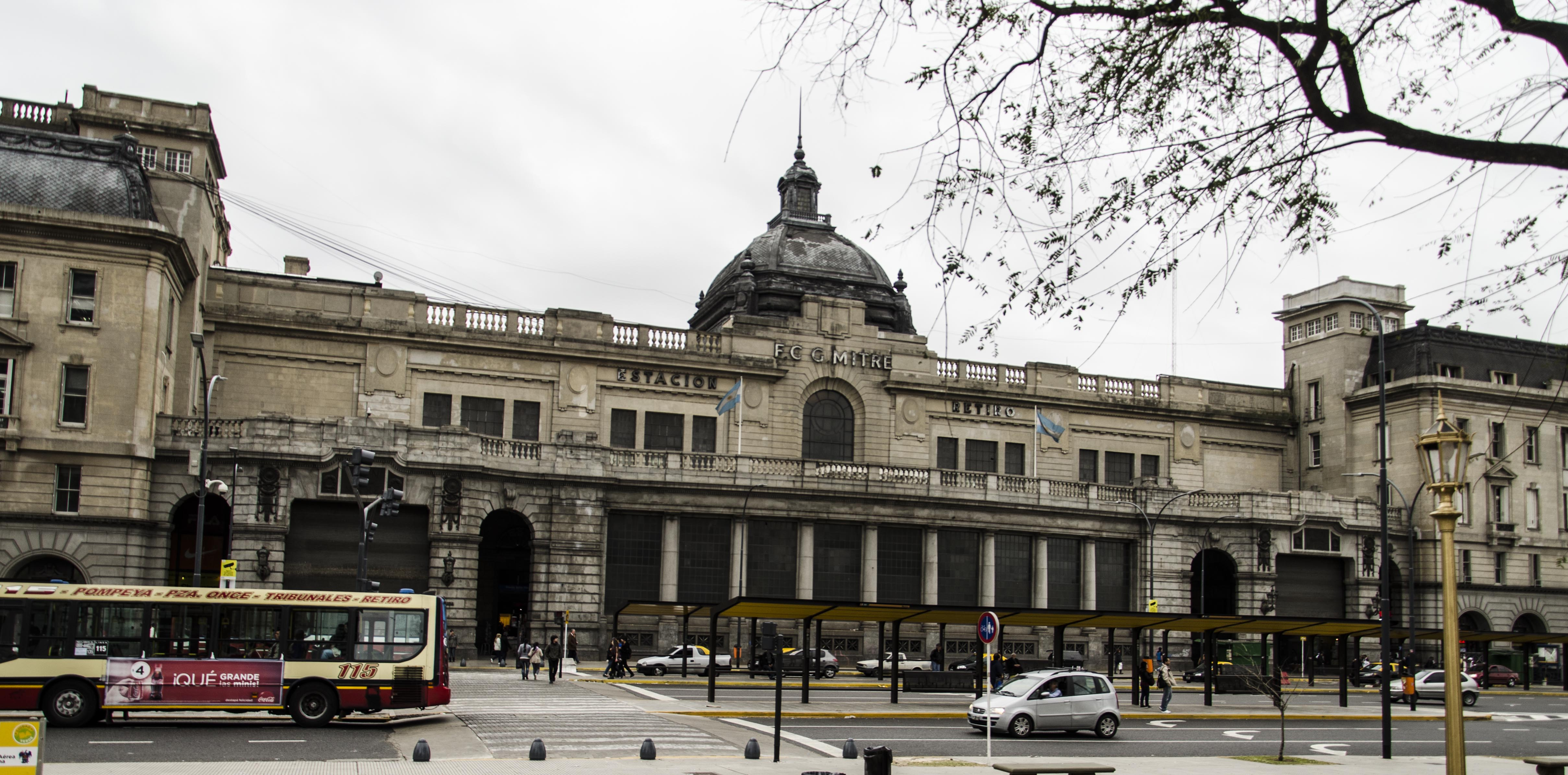
Mitre

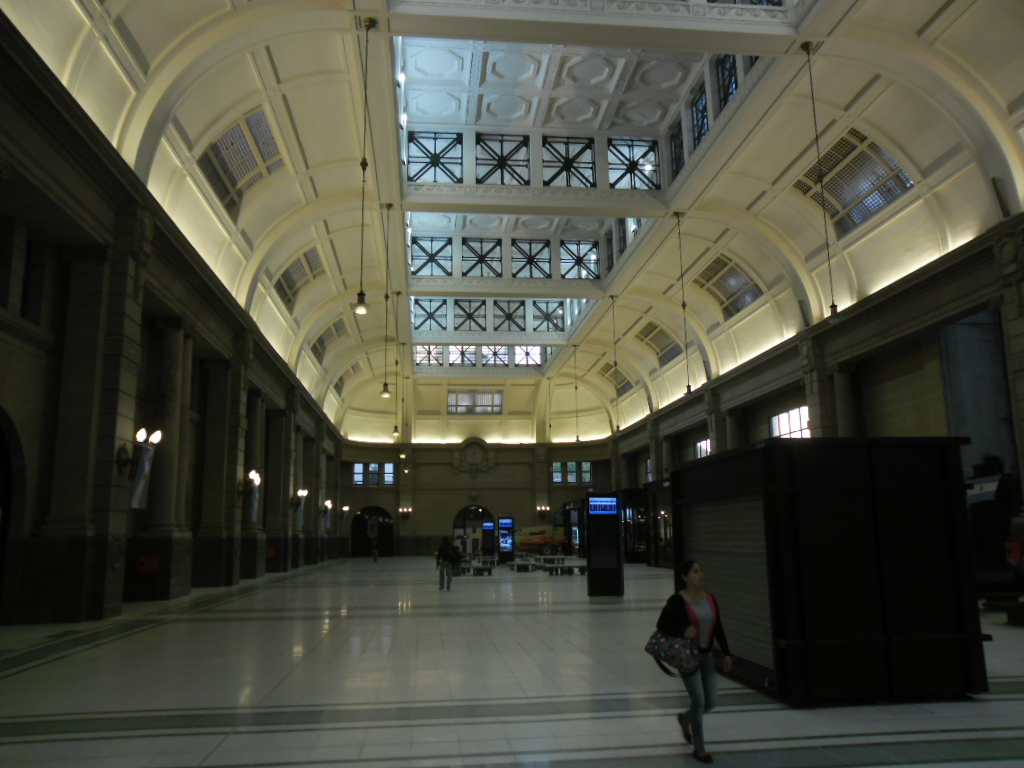

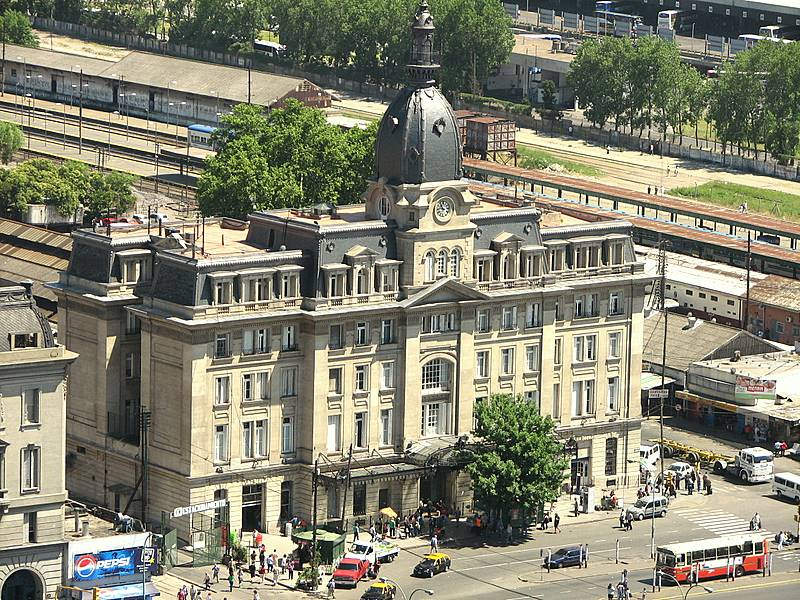
Belgrano

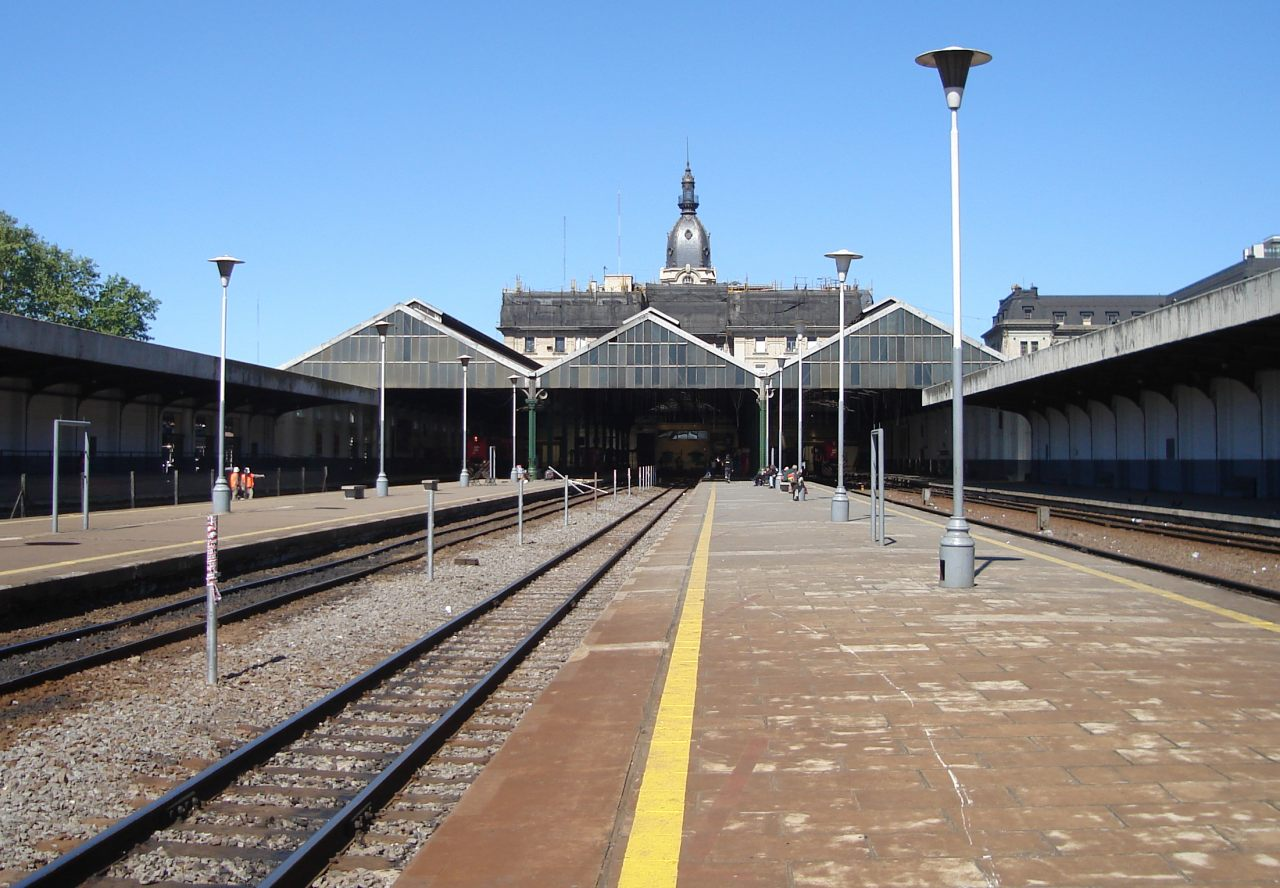
Belgrano

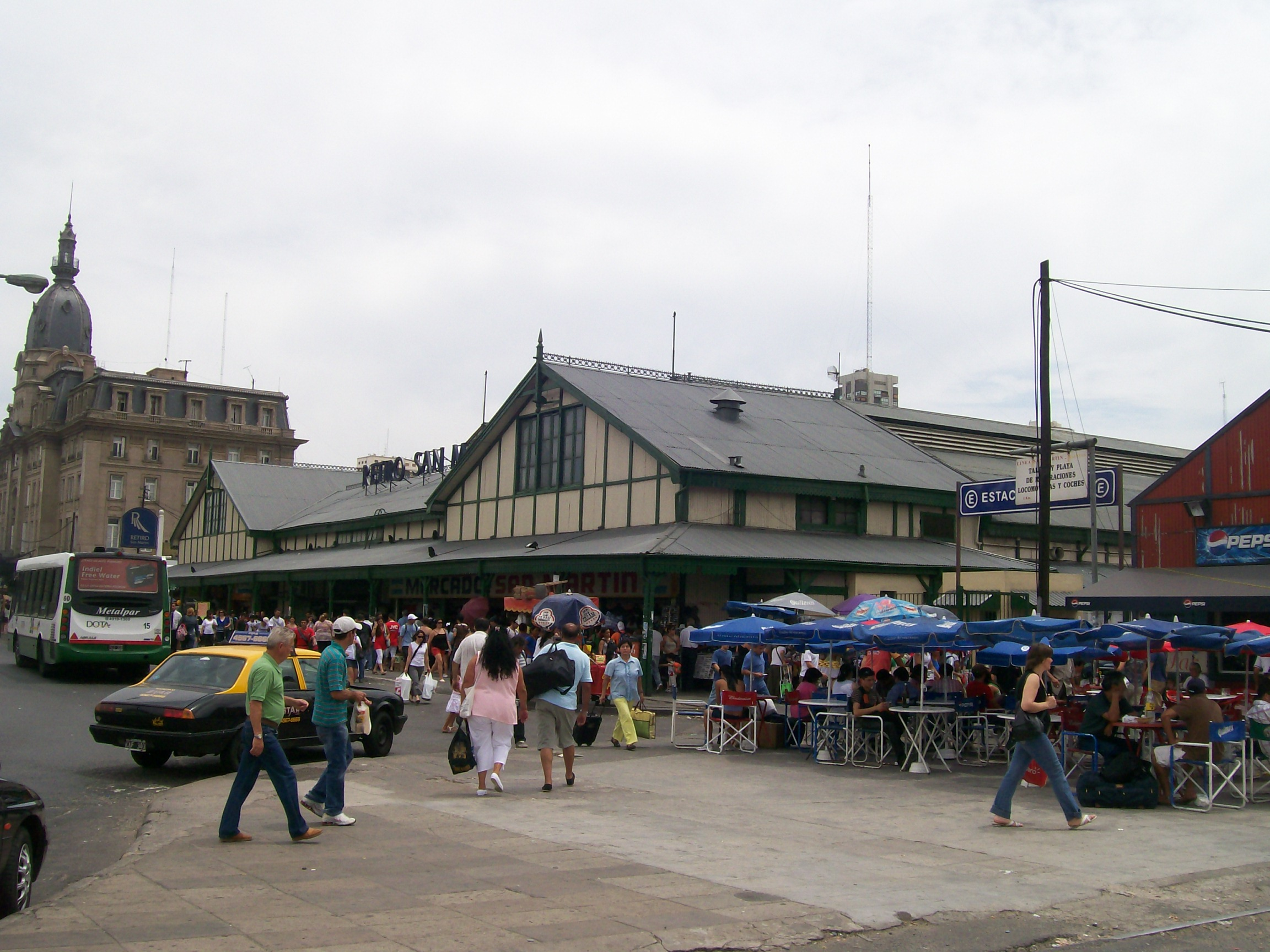
San Martín

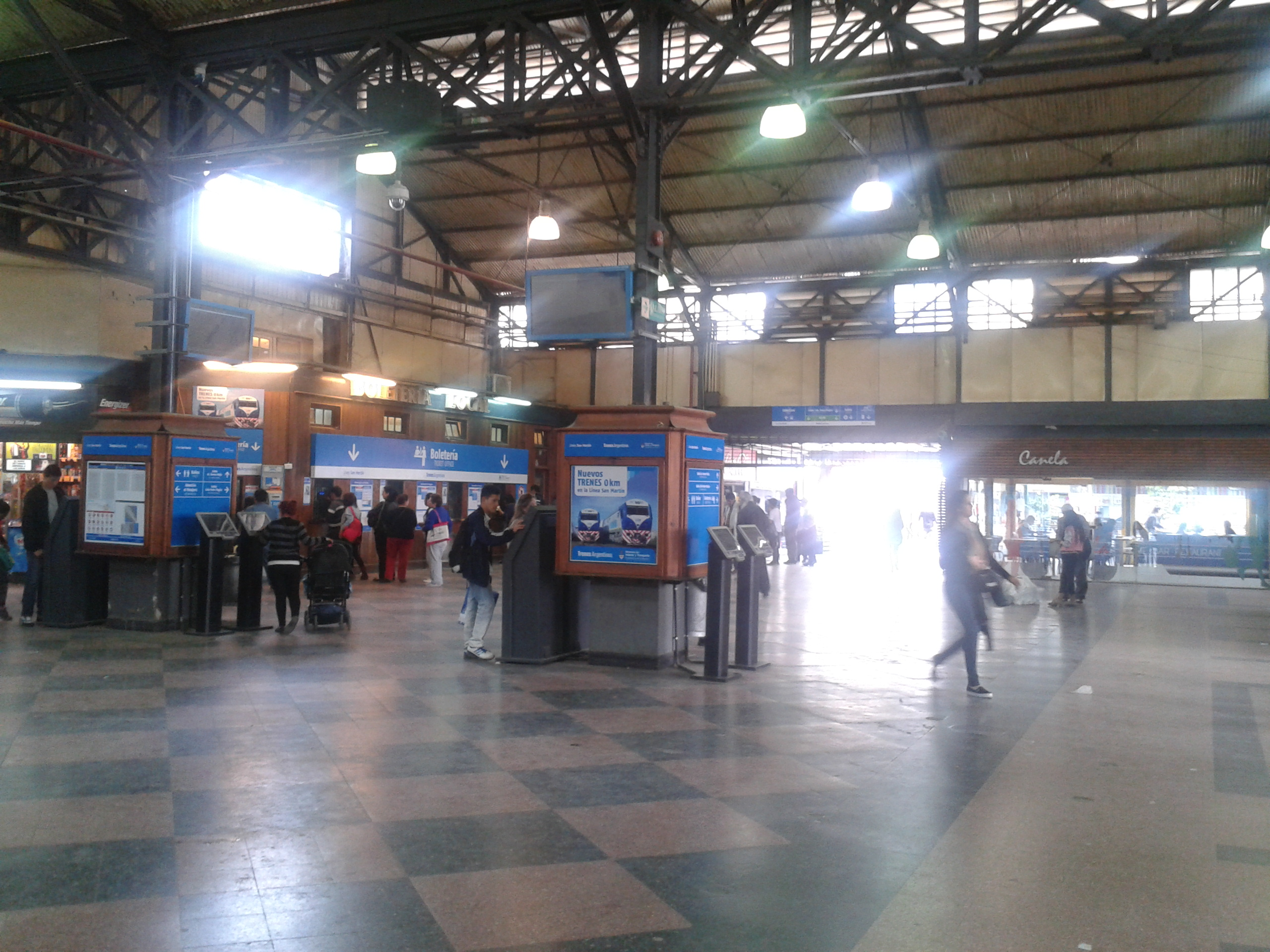
San Martín

== See also ==
- Retiro Belgrano railway station
- Retiro Mitre railway station
- Retiro San Martín railway station
- Rail transport in Argentina
- Retiro (Buenos Aires Underground)
