= El Retiro =

El Retiro can refer to:

- Parque del Buen Retiro, a park in Madrid, Spain
  - Retiro (Madrid Metro), a station on Line 2
- El Retiro (Lake Wales, Florida): a former estate in Lake Wales, Florida, United States
- El Retiro, Coahuila, a town in Mexico
- El Retiro, Coclé, Panama

== See also ==
- Retiro (disambiguation)
