= Retiro (Buenos Aires Underground) =

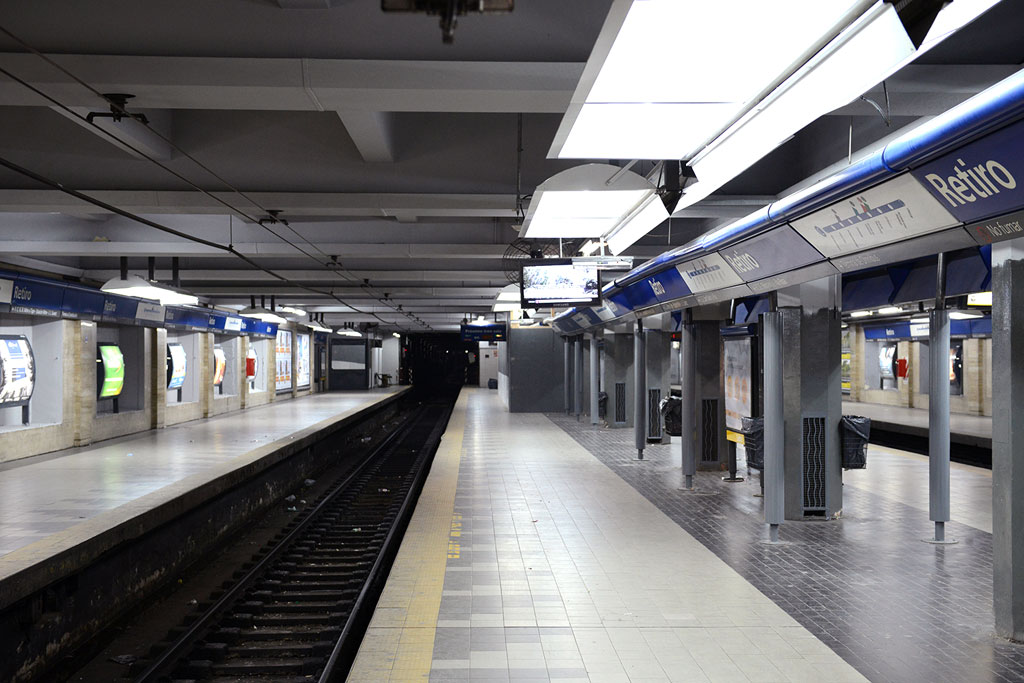
- Line C platforms

General information
- Location: Jose Ramos Mejía and Libertador
- Coordinates: 34°35′28.5″S 58°22′26.5″W
- Platforms: 1 island platform and 2 side platforms (Line C); 1 island platform (Line E)
- Tracks: 4
- Connections: Mitre Line, Belgrano Norte Line and San Martín Line at Retiro

Construction
- Depth: 25 metres (82 ft) (Line E)
- Accessible: Line E only

History
- Opened: 6 February 1936
- Former names: Presidente Perón (1949–1955)

Services
Preceding station	Buenos Aires Underground	Following station
Terminus	Line C	General San Martín towards Constitución
Catalinas towards Plaza de los Virreyes	Line E	Terminus
Location

Retiro is a terminus station on Lines C and E of the Buenos Aires Underground. The station is a part of the larger Retiro railway station which connects to the Mitre, San Martín and Belgrano railways, as well as their corresponding commuter rail lines. The station first opened on 6 February 1936 as part of the extension of Line C from Diagonal Norte; a second set of platforms for Line E opened on 3 June 2019 as part of that line's extension from Bolívar.

== Overview ==
The station serves as a connection point to the Retiro railway station, which serves as the central terminal for the General San Martín Railway and General Mitre Railway and their respective commuter rail services, as well as the Belgrano Norte Line.

Prior to the opening of the platforms for Line E in 2019, Retiro functioned as a terminus of line C for the station's first 74 years of operation. Future plans for the station would have made it a transfer hub between lines C, E, G, and H, but the extension of line E was given a higher priority. The platforms serving Line E were originally planned to be opened in August 2012, but the opening was repeatedly delayed due to numerous construction-related issues. Although the project reached 95% completion by May 2014, construction was suspended shortly thereafter due to delays in the procurement of rails and electrical components. Construction of the platforms would resume in December 2015 with the installation of tracks and the finishing of the station's elevators and escalators. In March 2018, an opening date of May 2019 was announced; the Line E platforms would ultimately open on 3 June 2019, nearly seven years after the originally planned opening date of 2012.

== Gallery ==
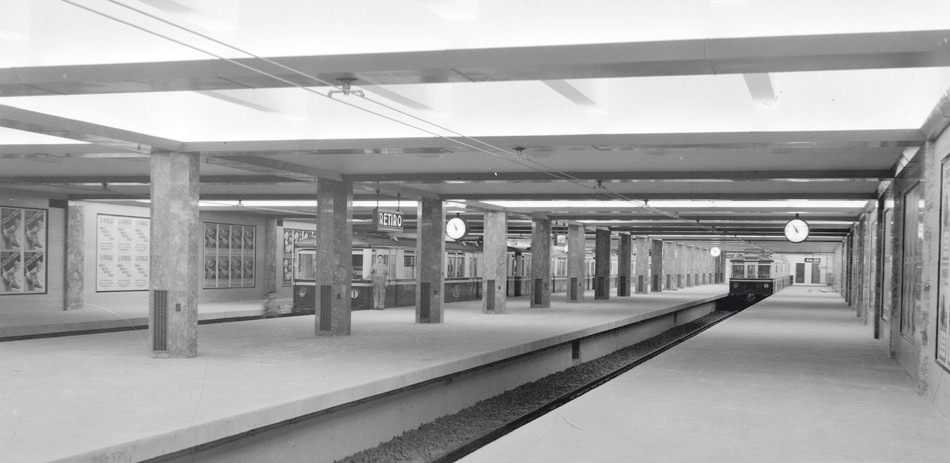
The station in 1940

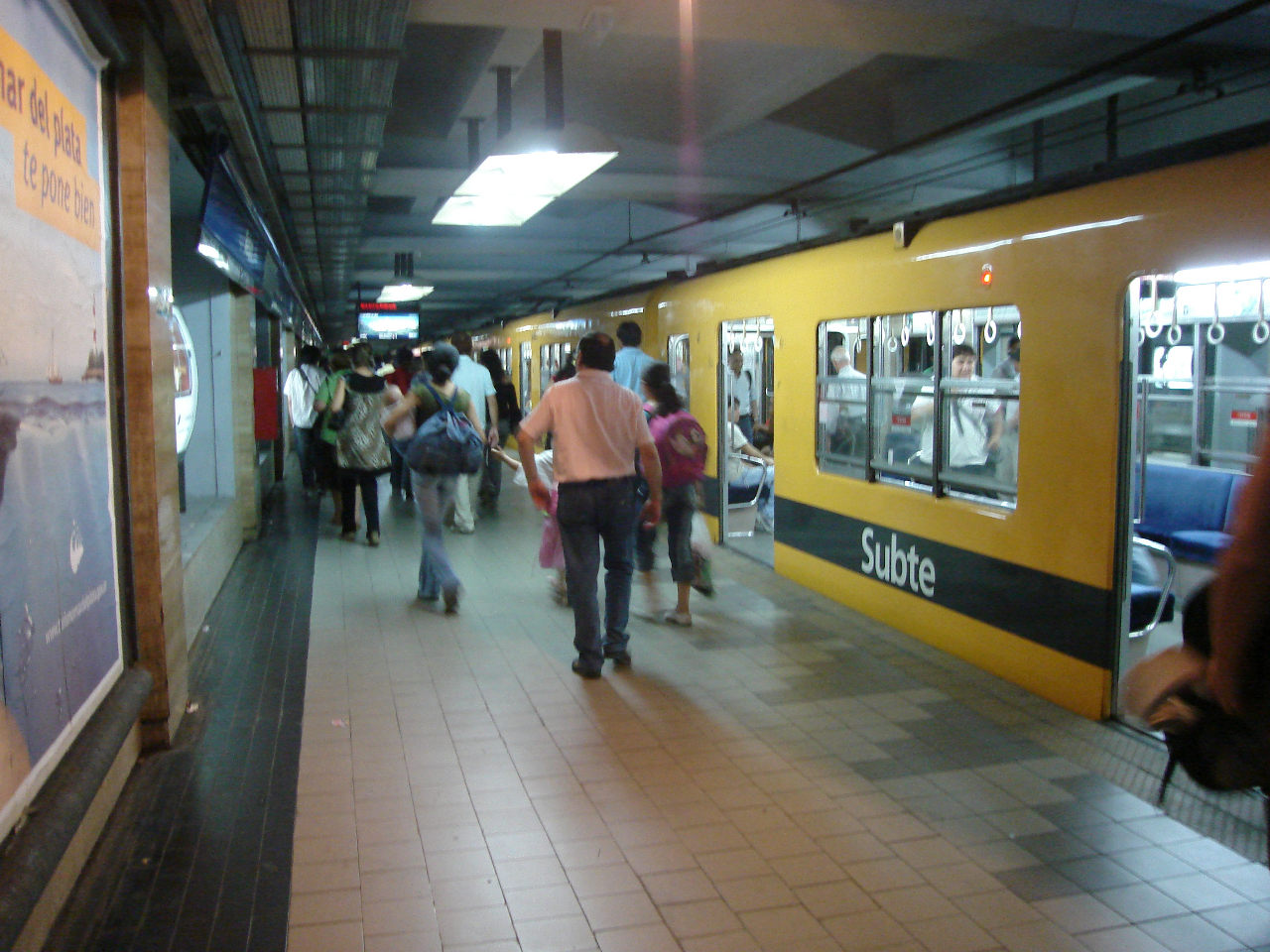
Line C exit platform

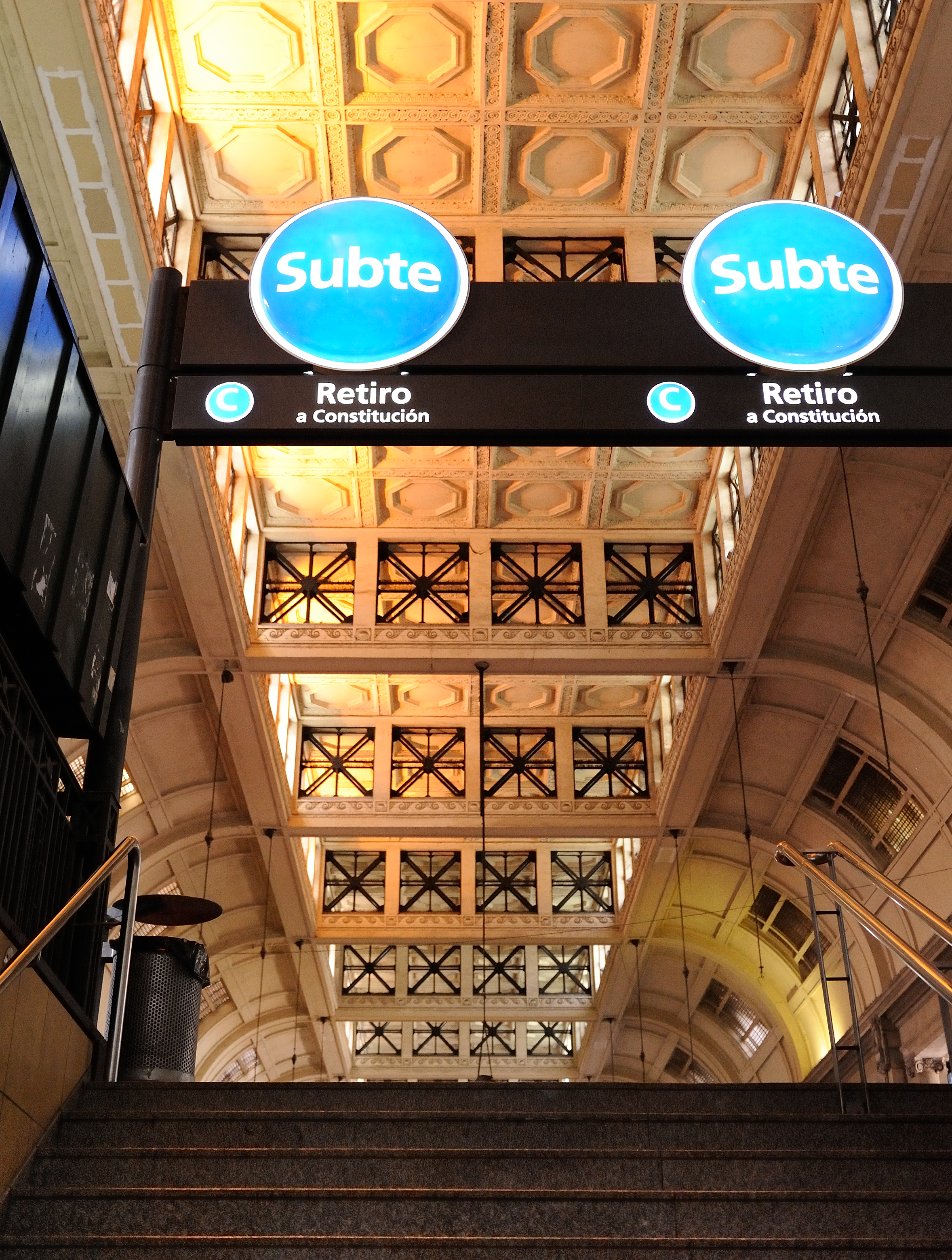
Entrance from Retiro railway station

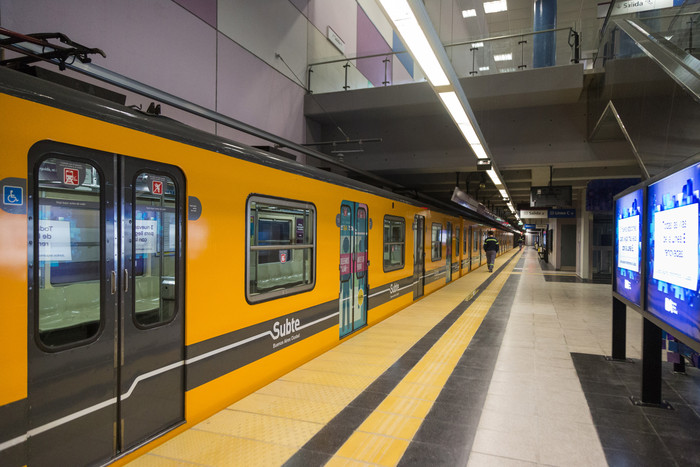
Line E platform shortly before opening in 2019

== See also ==
- Retiro bus station
- Retiro railway station (Belgrano, Mitre, San Martín)
