= Retiro bus station =

Bus station in Buenos Aires, Argentina

Retiro Bus Station
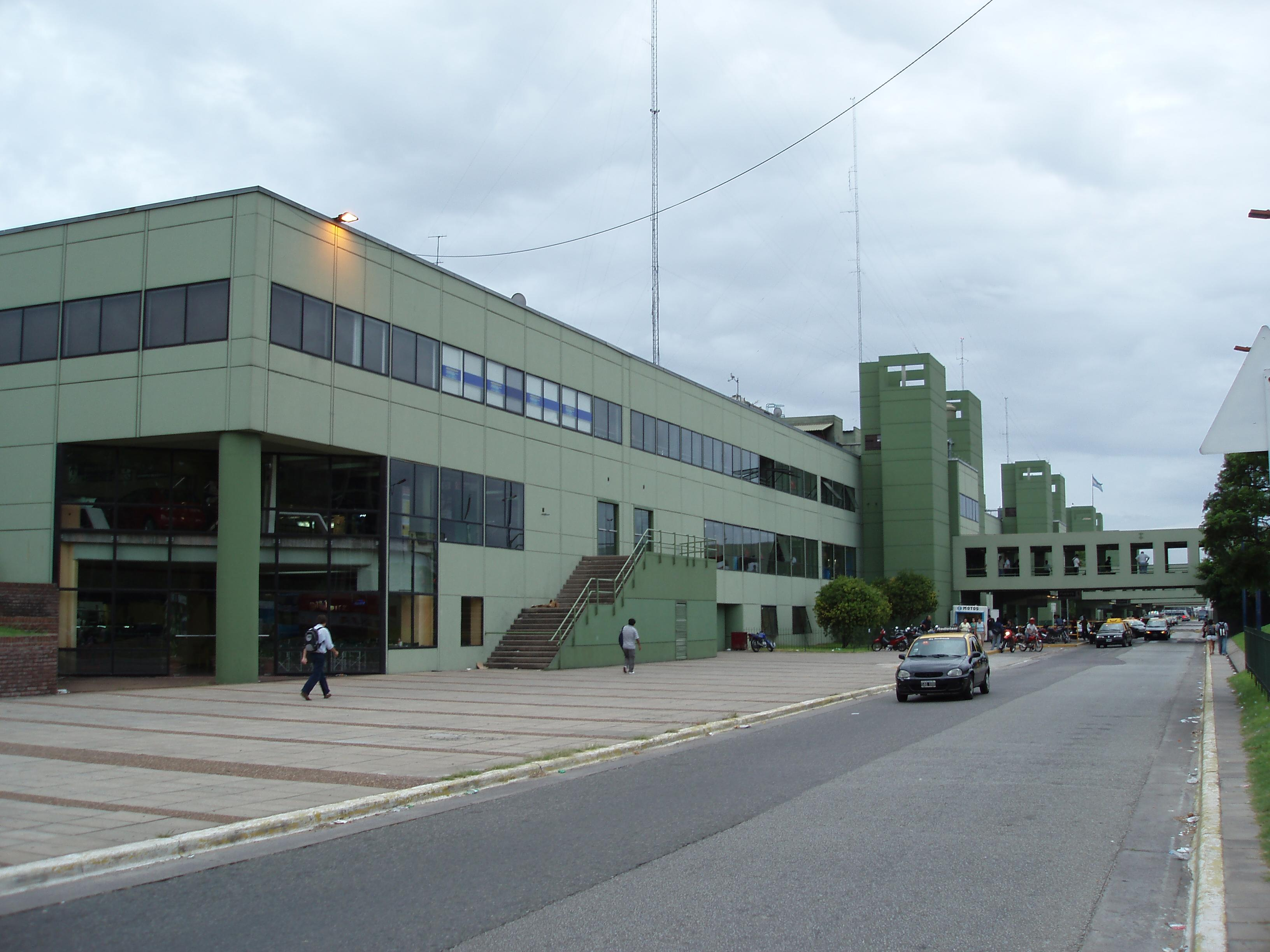

General information
- Location: Av. Antártida Argentina 1175; Retiro, Buenos Aires; Argentina
- Coordinates: 34°35′14″S 58°22′28″W
- Owner: Government of Argentina
- Operator: Terminal Buenos Aires S.A.
- Platforms: 75 gates
- Connections: Line C (Buenos Aires Metro) at Retiro

Construction
- Platform levels: 3
- Parking: 366 spaces

Other information
- Website: www.tebasa.com.ar

History
- Opened: May 1, 1983

Passengers
- 40,000 (daily)
Location

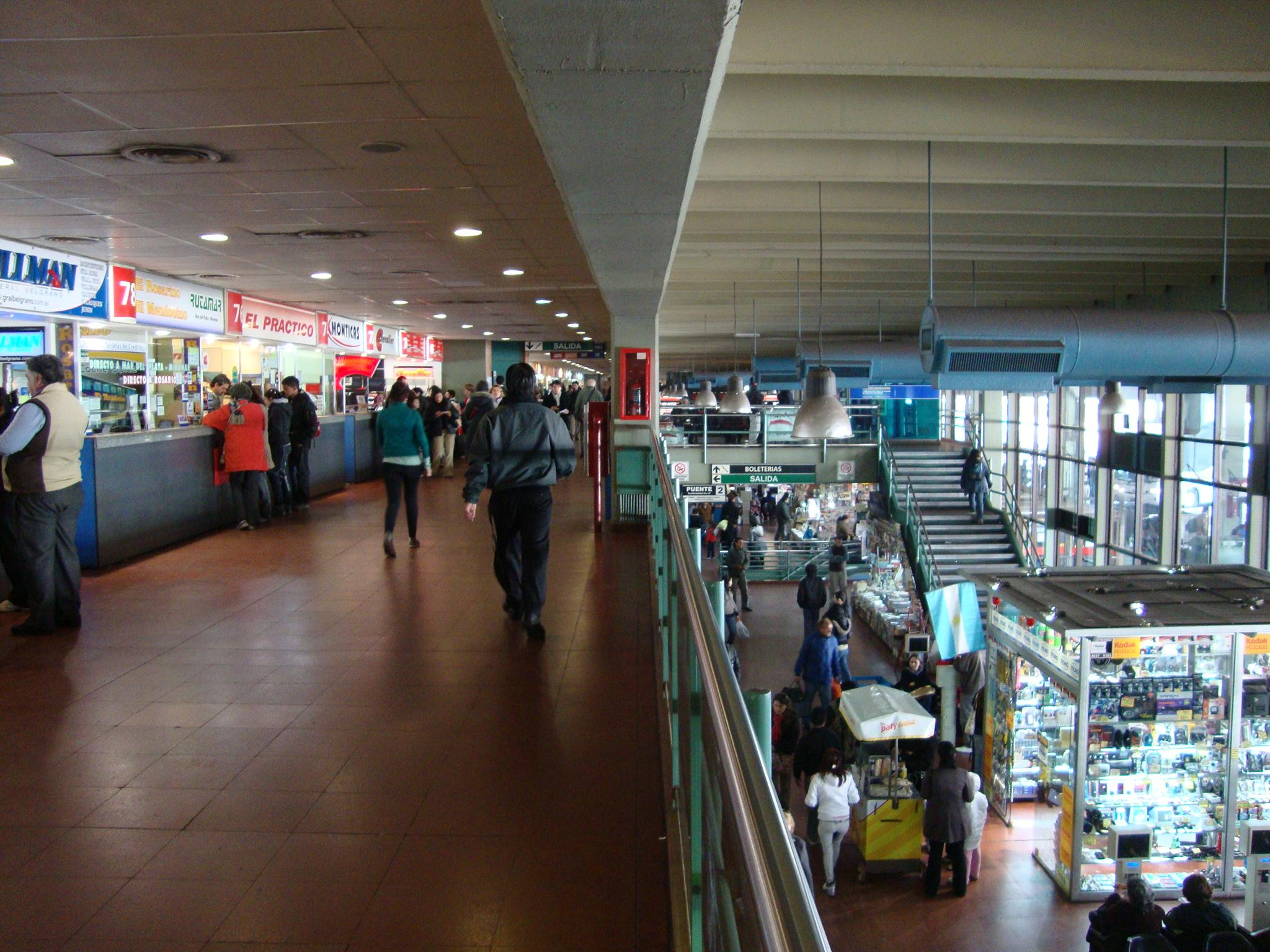
Main hall and concession stands

Retiro bus station (Spanish: Terminal de Ómnibus de Retiro) is the main bus terminal in Buenos Aires, Argentina. It is situated in the Retiro district, two blocks north of Retiro railway station.

== Overview ==
The station was commissioned in 1980 by the municipal government under Mayor Osvaldo Cacciatore. Designed by Fernando Serra, Jorge Valera, and Raúl Petrucci, the station was inaugurated in 1983. The station, nearly 400 metres (440 yd) in length, includes 75 gates and is accessible from the parking lot via five elevated walkways. Buses depart from Retiro for all parts of Argentina, and for the neighbouring countries of Uruguay, Brazil, Paraguay, Bolivia, and Chile, as well as for Lima, Peru. Buses are operated from the terminal by over 100 Argentine and foreign companies. Other services at the station include gift shops, a bar, numerous fast food concessions, a pharmacy, paramedics, a Bank of the City of Buenos Aires branch, and the Integral parcel service.

The bus station has been operated since 1993 by Teba S.A., a private company. Plans for the refurbishment of the terminal were announced in 2016.

== See also ==
- Transportation in Argentina
- Retiro railway station (Belgrano, Mitre, San Martín)
- Retiro underground station (Line C, Line G, Line H)
