= Retiro Mitre railway station =

Railway station in Buenos Aires, Argentina

Retiro Mitre
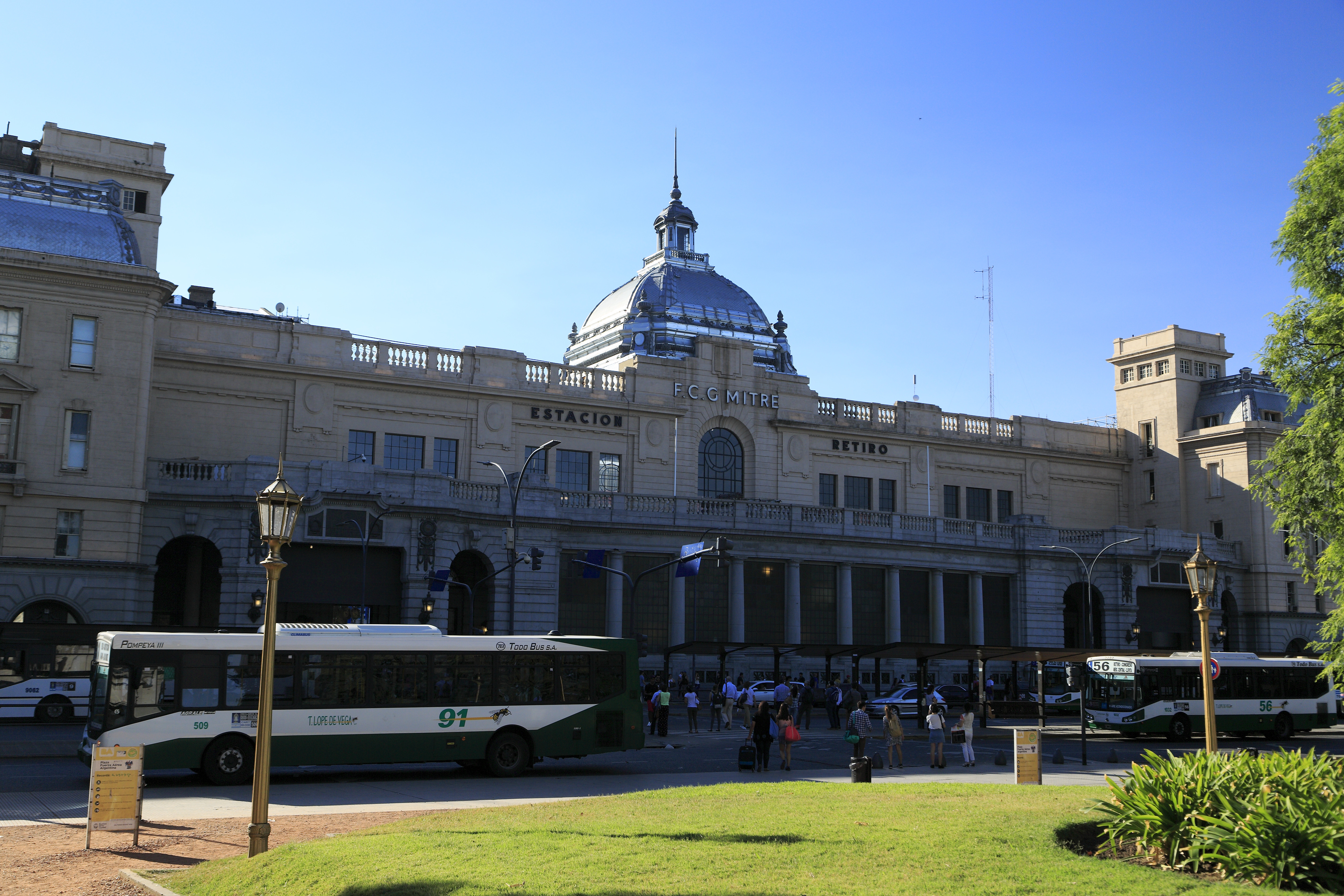
- Station facade

General information
- Location: Av. Ramos Mejía 1358, Buenos Aires; Argentina
- Coordinates: 34°35′29″S 58°22′29″W
- System: Terminal station
- Owner: Government of Argentina
- Operator: Trenes Argentinos
- Line: Mitre
- Platforms: 8
- Connections: Subte; Retiro Belgrano; Retiro San Martín; Bus terminus

Other information
- Fare zone: Retiro, Buenos Aires

History
- Opened: August 1, 1915; 111 years ago

National Historic Monument of Argentina
- Designated: 2006
Location
- Location within Buenos Aires

Retiro-Mitre, or simply Retiro, is one of the six large mainline railway station termini in Buenos Aires, Argentina. Located in the neighborhood of Retiro, it serves as terminal station for the Mitre Line that runs local trains to the northern suburbs of the Buenos Aires metropolitan area. It also functions as terminal station for the national General Mitre Railway, being one of Argentina's largest railway stations.

Retiro Mitre is accessible by the C line and Line E of the Buenos Aires Metro system and by numerous local public bus services. The station will also be accessible by Line H of the metro once its extension is complete. The station is also near Retiro bus station (Terminal de Omnibus), the principal long-distance bus terminal in Buenos Aires.

In 2006, the station was declared a National Historic Monument of Argentina.

== History ==
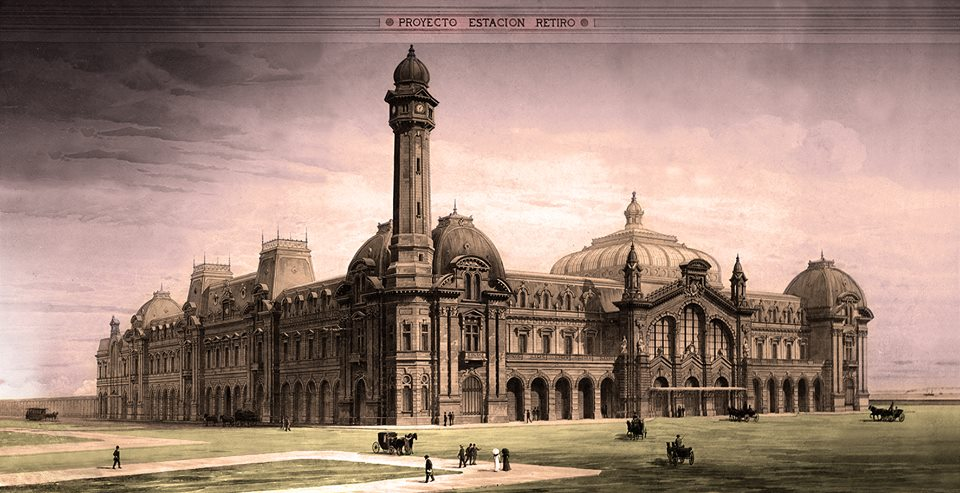
Project of the station in 1909. This original design was later modified

The Edwardian-style station building was designed by the British architects Eustace L. Conder, Roger Conder and Sydney G. Follet together with the engineer Reginald Reynolds. Building began in June 1909 and the station was opened on 1 August 1915 while being operated by the Central Argentine Railway. The steel structure for the building was made in Liverpool, England, and re-assembled in Argentina.

For many years it was considered to be the most important example of structural engineering in South America and architecturally one of the finest buildings in the world. The train shed was supplied by the Butterley Company and closely resembles that at St Pancras in London.

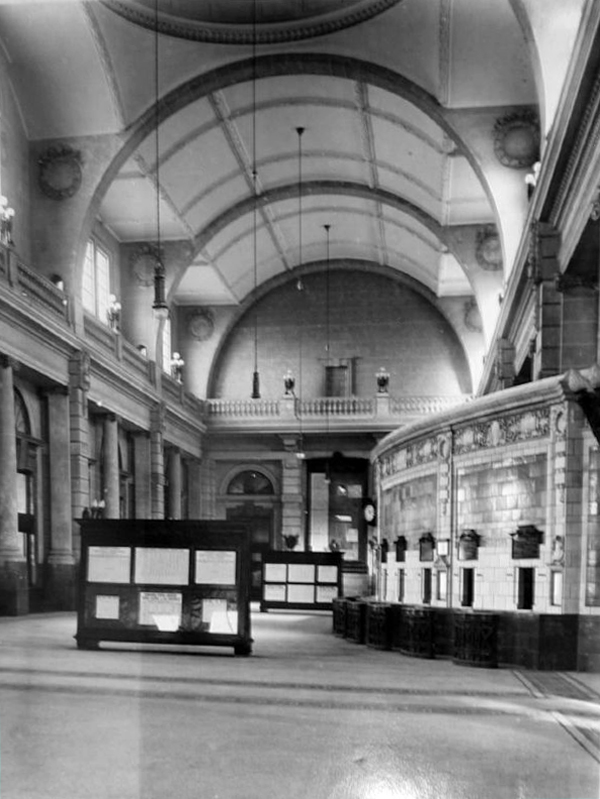
Tickets office in the main hall, 1915

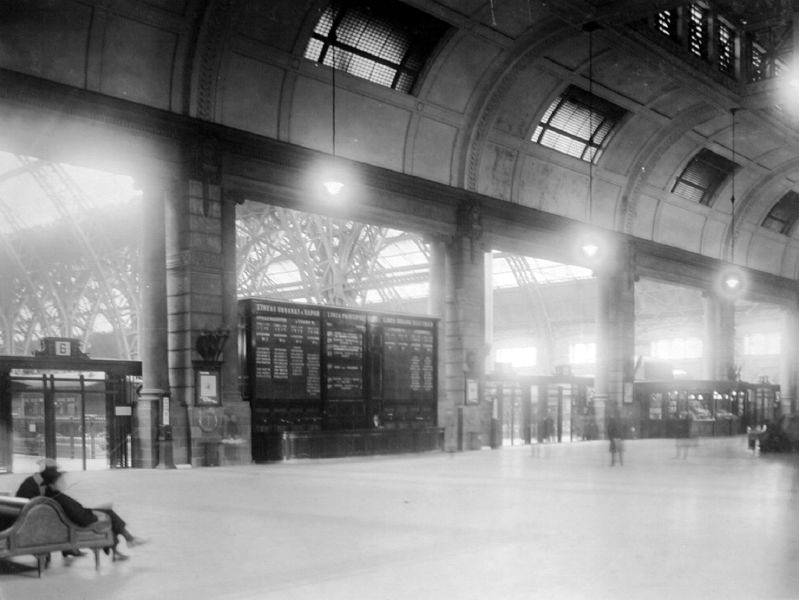
Great hall, 1915

After the railway Nationalisation in Argentina, the station became part of the Bartolomé Mitre Railway, a division of state-owned Ferrocarriles Argentinos, which operated commuter rail and long-distance services to Tucumán (the Estrella del Norte being the most notable of them) When the entire rail network was privatised in the early 1990s, Retiro Mitre was taken over by Trenes de Buenos Aires (TBA) for commuter services and Tucumán Ferrocarriles for long-distance journeys to the province, also crossing Rosario and Santiago del Estero. Other private companies operating the station were Corredores Ferroviarios and Ferrocentral.

In 1997 the Retiro Mitre station was declared a National Monument.

In 2015 plans were announced to expand the station with new platforms to accommodate long-distance services operated by Operadora Ferroviaria Sociedad del Estado. The new part of the station would have new road access from Libertador Avenue, replacing land currently used for storage of rolling stock. The existing buildings are also currently being renovated, including restoration of the train shed.

== Services ==
State-owned Trenes Argentinos operates the commuter rail services calling at José León Suárez (General San Martín Partido), Tigre, and Bartolomé Mitre along its three branches. Long-distance services to Rosario and Tucumán cities are also operated by the same company.

== In media ==
Several films have been filmed at the station, the most important of which are Evita and The Secret in Their Eyes. Also several novels take place in the station and its surroundings.

== Historic operators ==
Operator	Period
(United Kingdom) Central Argentine Railway	1915–1948
(Argentina) Ferrocarriles Argentinos	1948–1991
(Argentina) FEMESA (Note: Temporary operator prior to the privatization of commuter rail services.)	1991–94
(Argentina) TBA	1995–2012
(Argentina) Ferrocentral (Note: Only for long distance services to northern provinces.)	2005–2014
(Argentina) UGOMS (Note: Temporary operator after concessions to TBA were revoked.)	2012–14
(Argentina) Corredores Ferroviarios	2014–15
(Argentina) Trenes Argentinos	2015–present

== Gallery ==
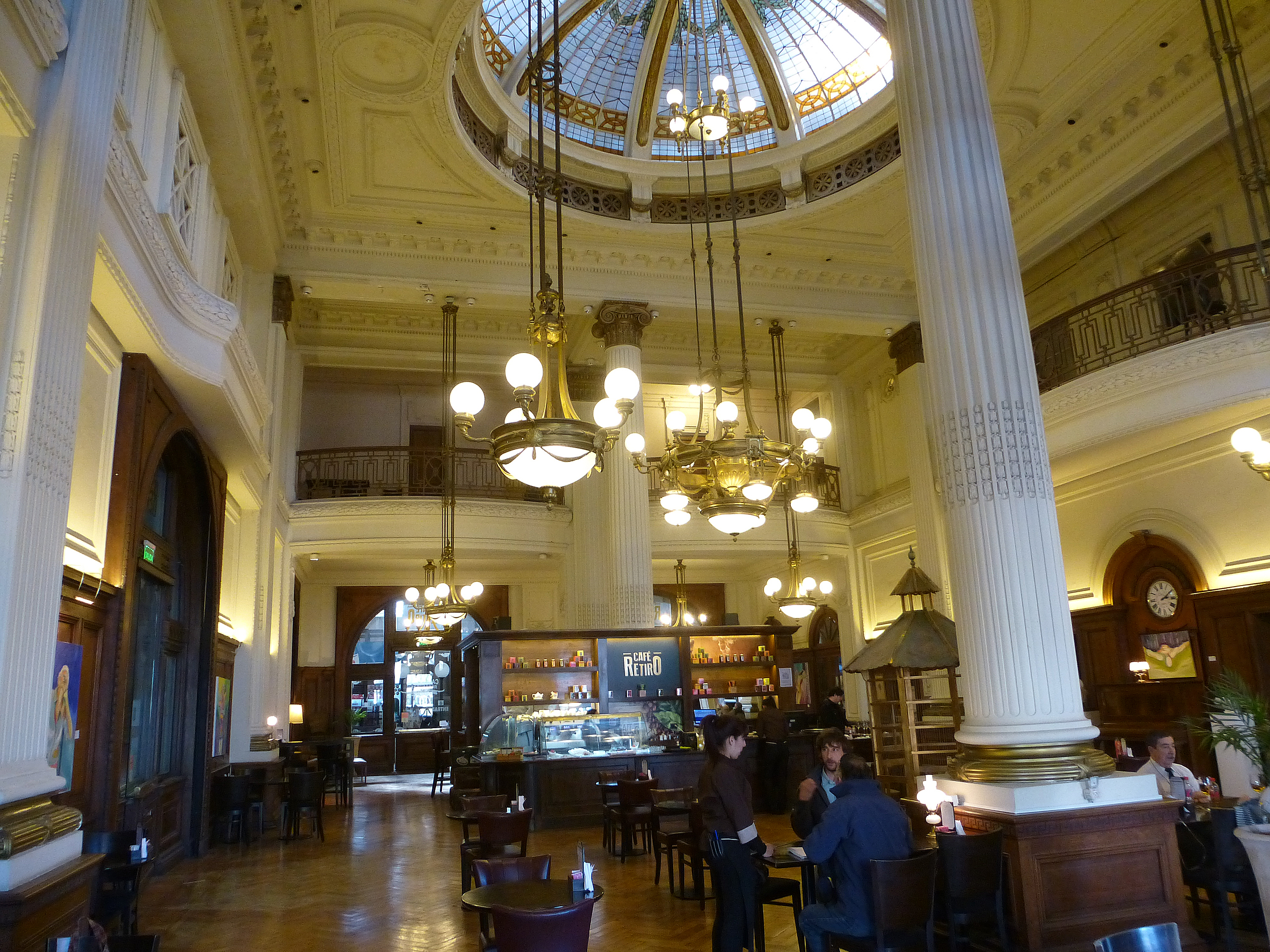
Coffeehouse, 2013

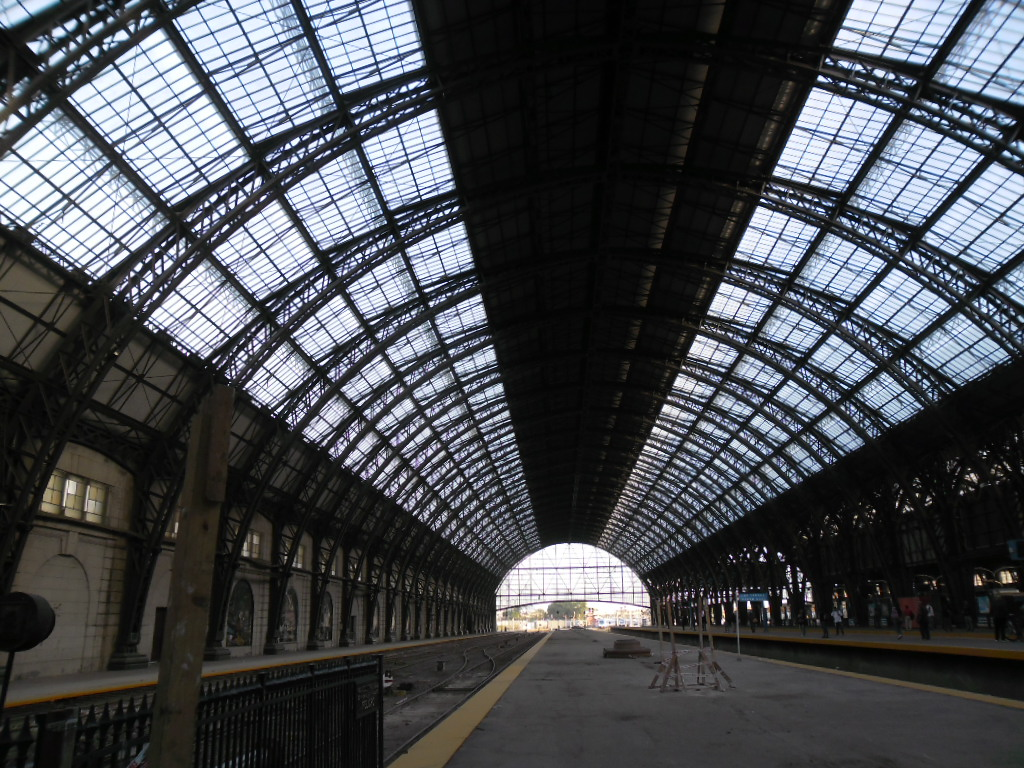
Platform roofs, 2015

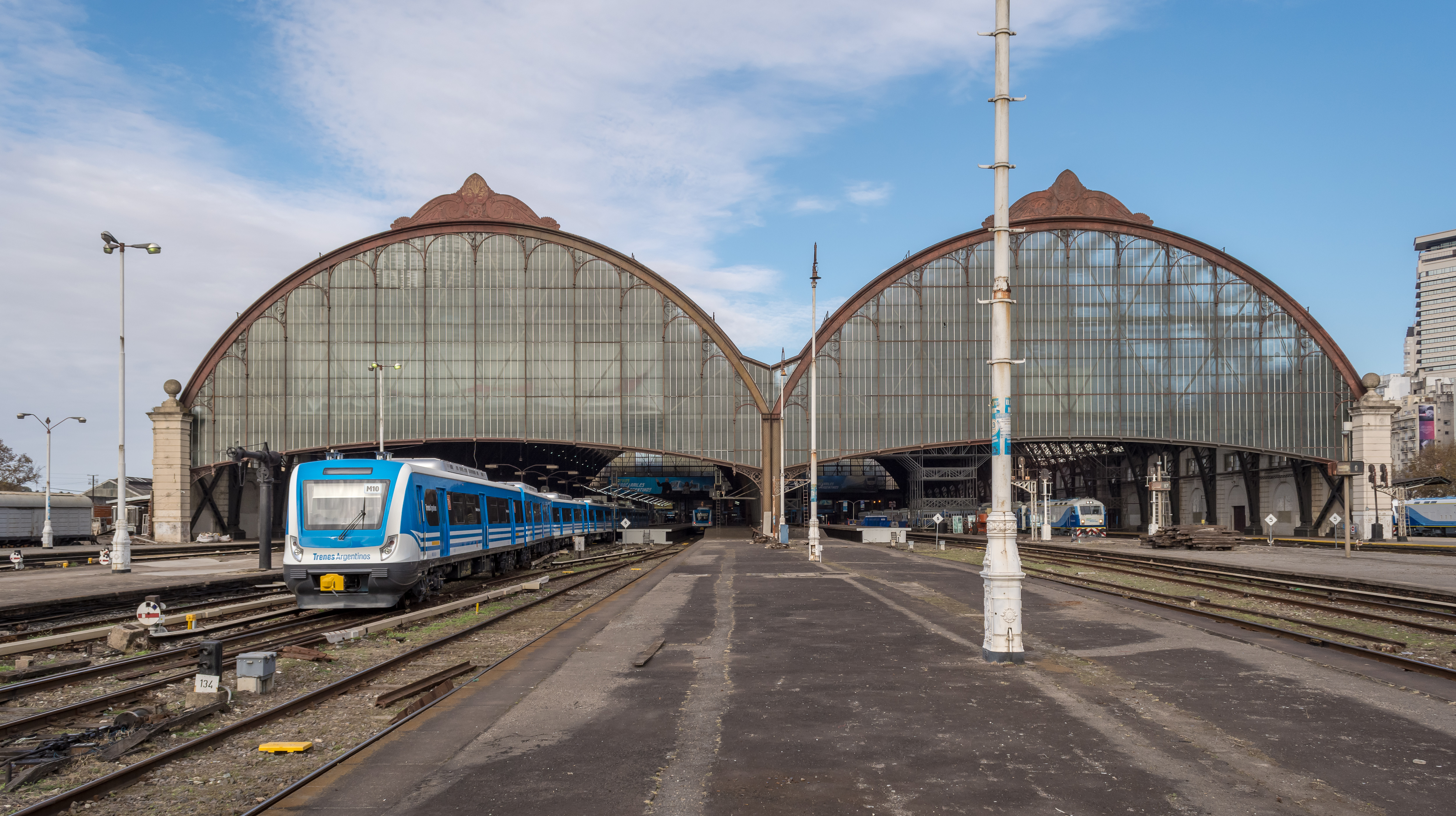
North view, 2015

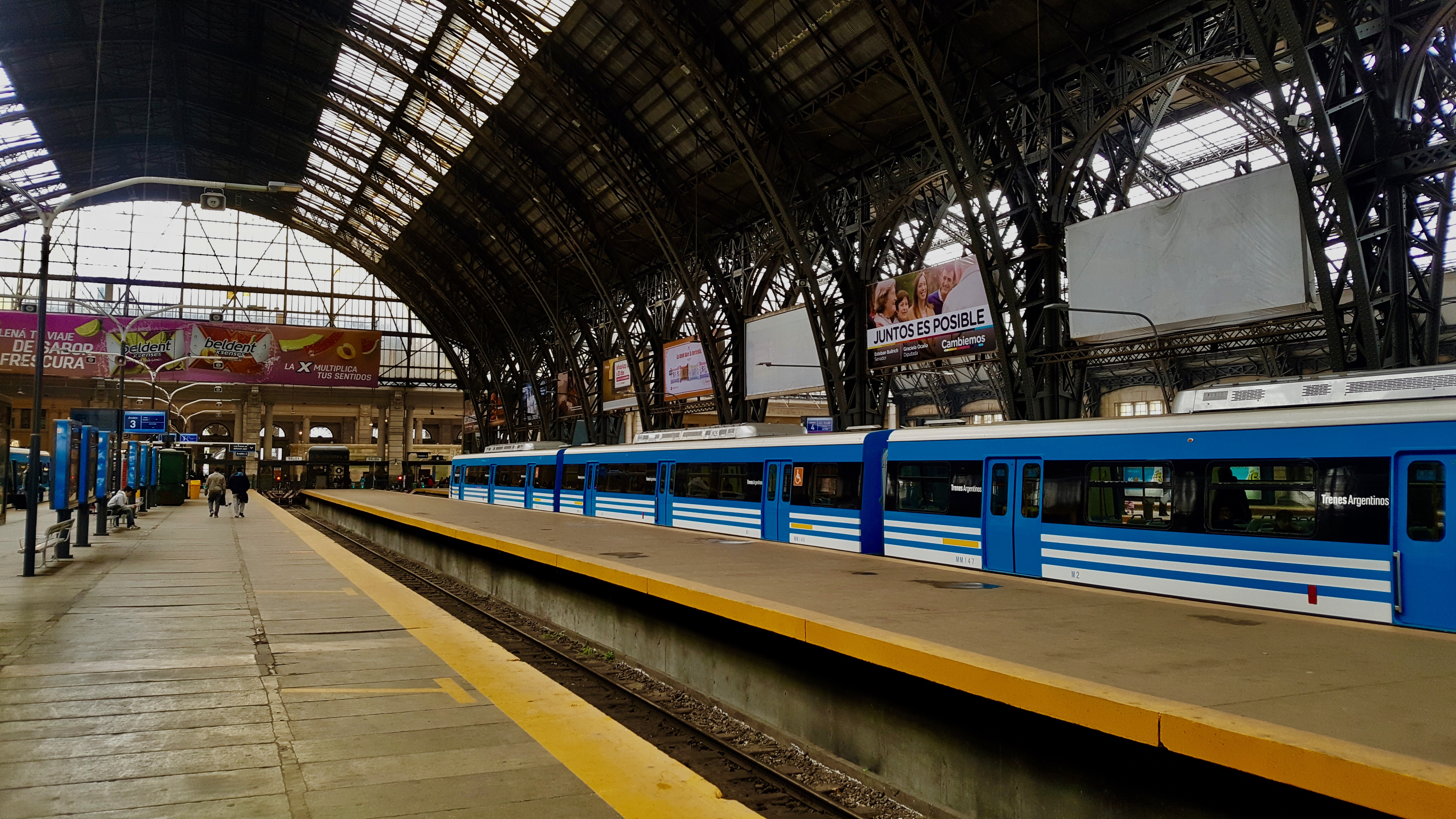
Train platforms, 2017

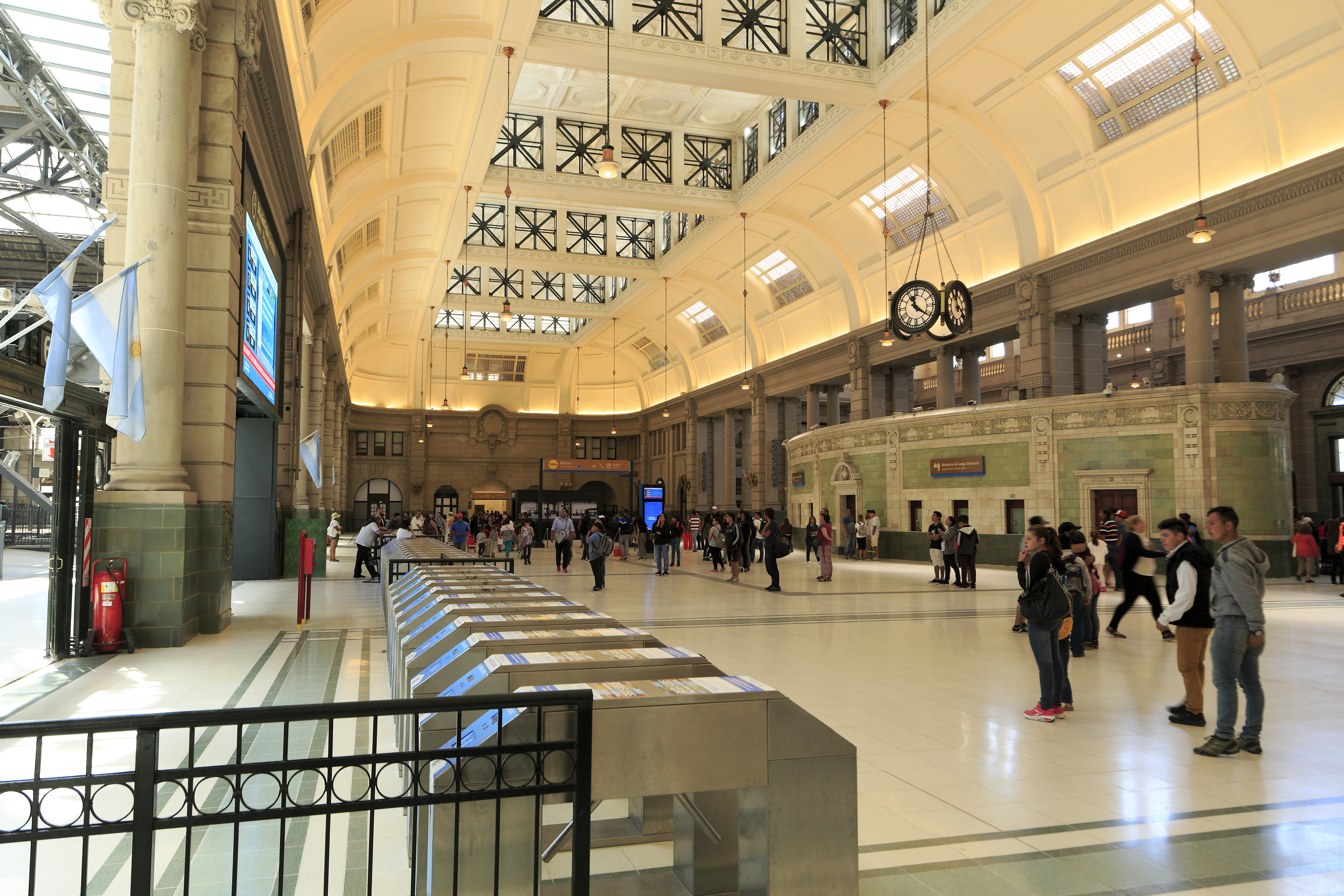
Hall, 2018

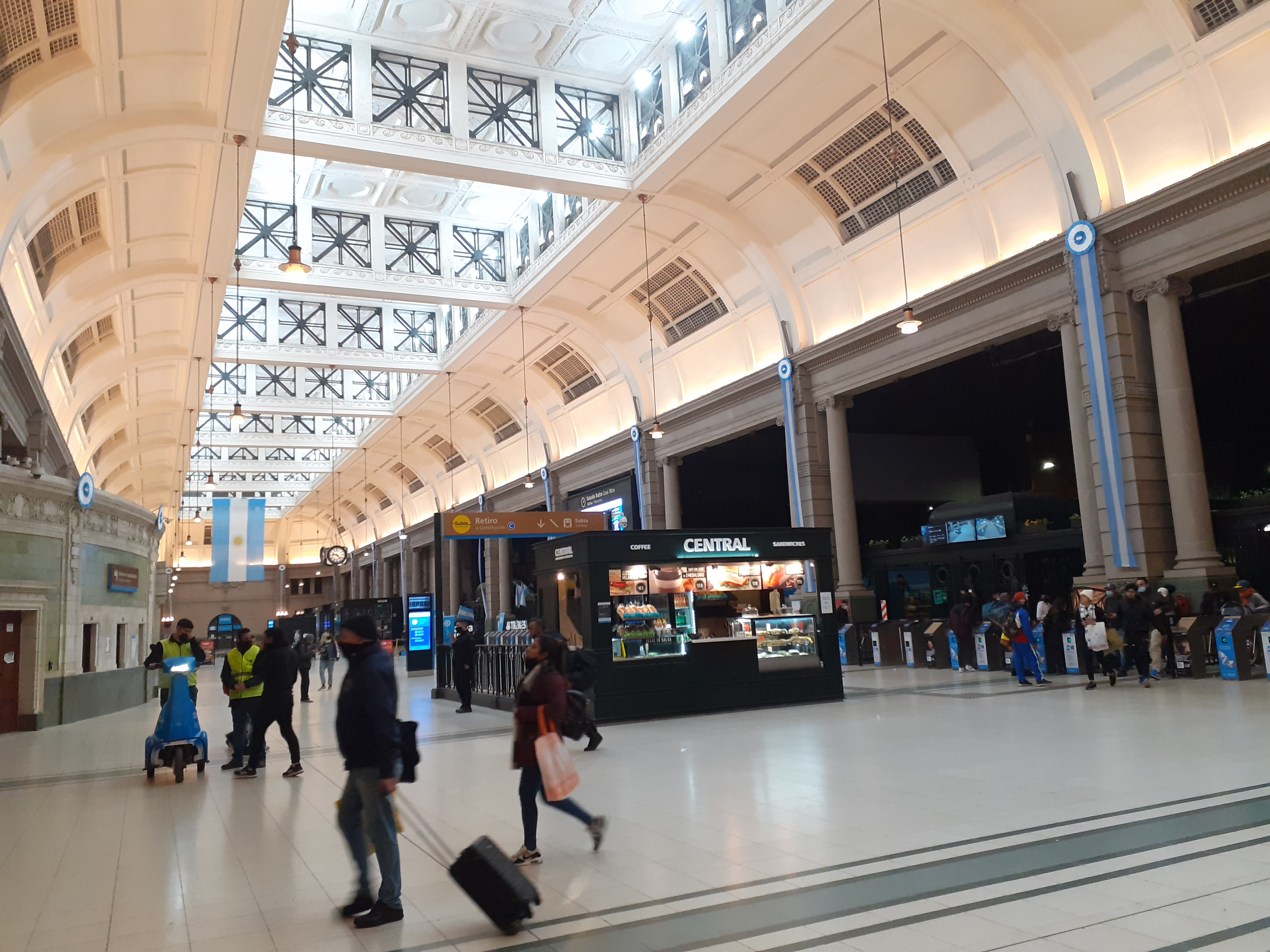
Central hall, 2022

== See also ==
- Retiro (Line C Buenos Aires Underground)
- Retiro (Line E Buenos Aires Underground)
