= Retiro Belgrano railway station =

Railway station in Buenos Aires, Argentina

Retiro Belgrano
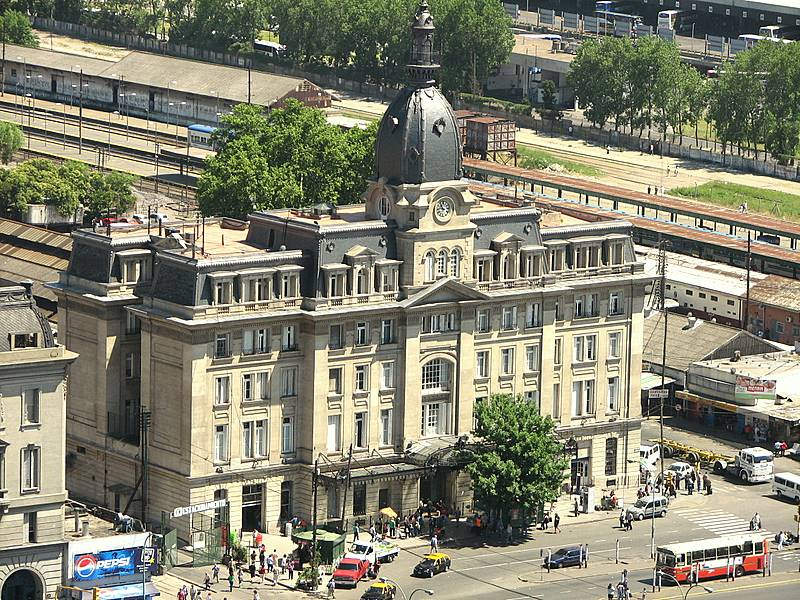

General information
- Location: Avenida Ramos Mejía 1430; Buenos Aires; Argentina
- Coordinates: 34°35′26″S 58°22′34″W
- System: Commuter rail
- Owner: Government of Argentina
- Operator: Ferrovías
- Line: Belgrano Norte
- Platforms: 6
- Connections: Subte (under construction:); Retiro Mitre; Retiro San Martín; Bus terminus

Other information
- Fare zone: Retiro, Buenos Aires

History
- Opened: 1912; 114 years ago

National Historic Monument of Argentina
- Designated: 2021
Location

Retiro-Belgrano, or simply Retiro, is one of the six large mainline railway station termini in Buenos Aires, Argentina. Located in the neighborhood of Retiro, it serves as terminal station for the Belgrano Norte Line that runs local trains to the northern suburbs of the Buenos Aires metropolitan area. It also functions as terminal station for the national cargo train General Belgrano Railway.

Built in 1912, its Beaux-Arts design makes it one of the most recognizable landmarks of french neoclassicism in the country. The terminal is the fourth-busiest train station in Argentina.

== Overview ==
Retiro Belgrano is the terminus for the General Belgrano Railway and is adjacent to the Retiro bus station (Terminal de Omnibus), the principal long-distance bus terminal in Buenos Aires, the Retiro Mitre station of Mitre Railway, and the Retiro San Martín station of the San Martín Railway. The complex is accessible by the C line of the Buenos Aires Metro system and by numerous local public bus services.

The station will also be accessible by both Line E and Line H of the metro once their extensions are complete.

Retiro Belgrano has three entrances, the main one on Ramos Mejía avenue, another next to the main entrance (on the same avenue) and a lateral one (on Padre Mujica street, at the east).

== History ==
The building was built by the British Córdoba Central Railway that originally connected the cities of Rosario and Córdoba until in 1903 the Government allowed the company to extend its network to Buenos Aires, from north to south. In 1906 trains reached Villa Rosa in Pilar Partido and finally arriving in Buenos Aires in 1912. The terminal station, designed by architects Faure Dujarric (Louis Faure-Dujarric) and Robert Prentice, was remodeled and enlarged in 1914. One floor and a dome with a clock were added to the original construction. The building style has remained to present days.

In 2011 the station was remodeled, repairing the external masonry, facade and dome.

In May 2021, the station was declared National Historic Monument, along with other terminal stations such as Once, Constitución, and Federico Lacroze.

== Historic operators ==
| Operator | Period |
|---|---|
| Córdoba Central Railway | 1912–1948 |
| Ferrocarriles Argentinos | 1948–1991 |
| FEMESA (Note: Temporary operator prior to the privatization of commuter rail services.) | 1991–1994 |
| Ferrovías | 1994–present |

== Gallery ==
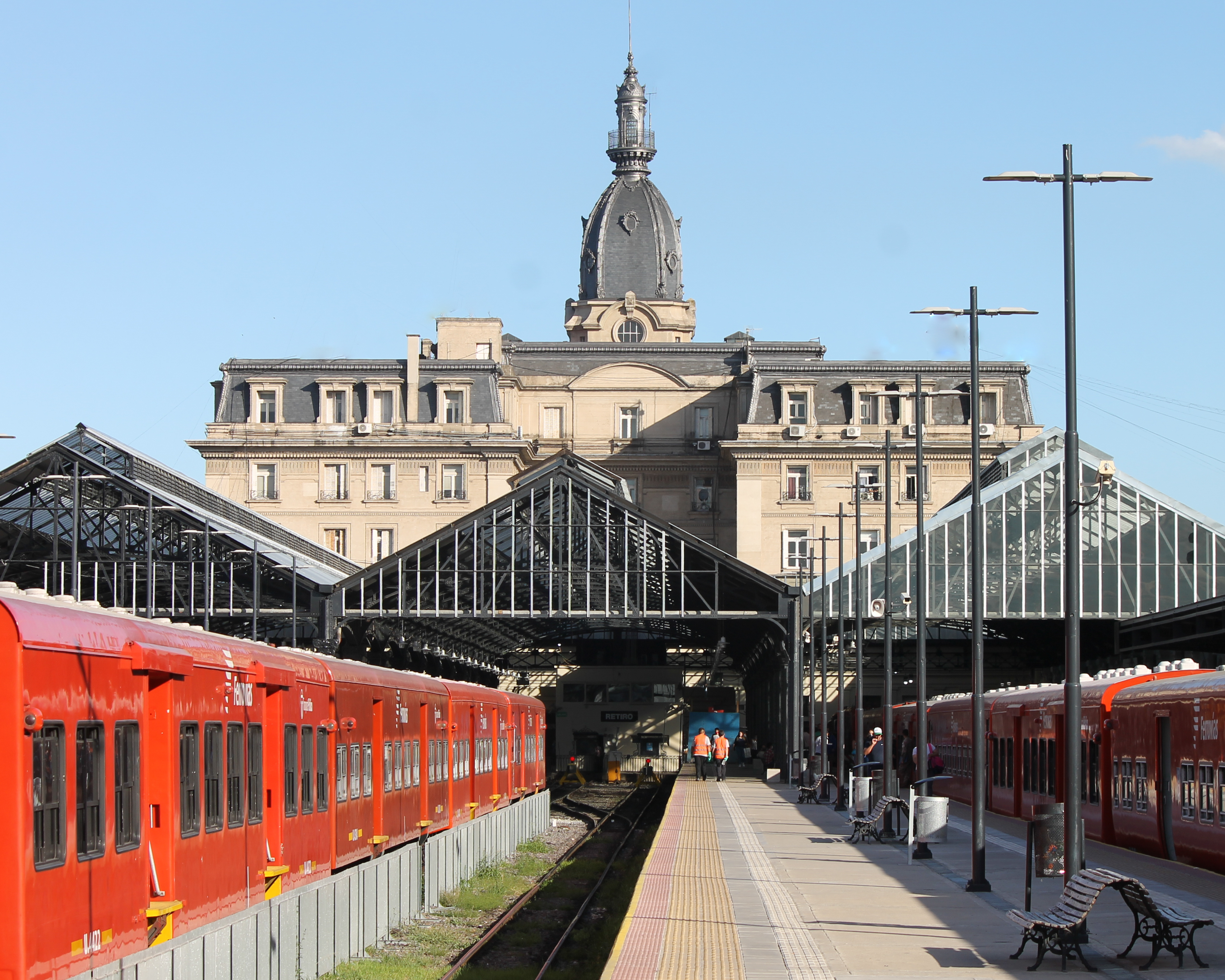
View from the north

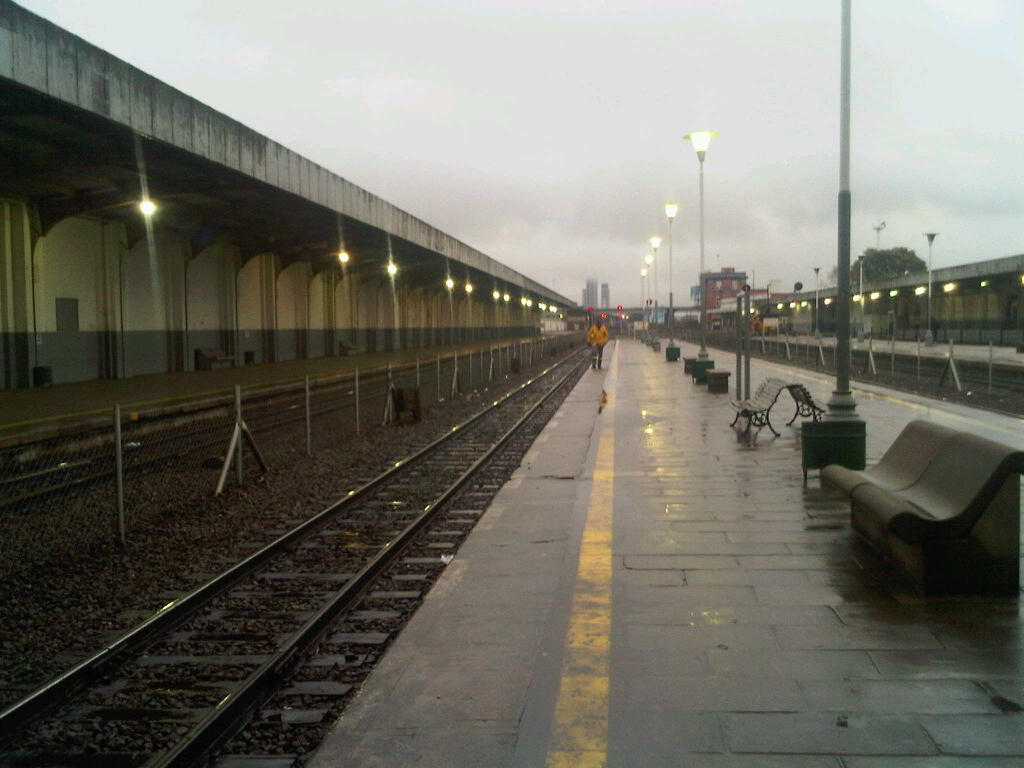
Outdoor platform

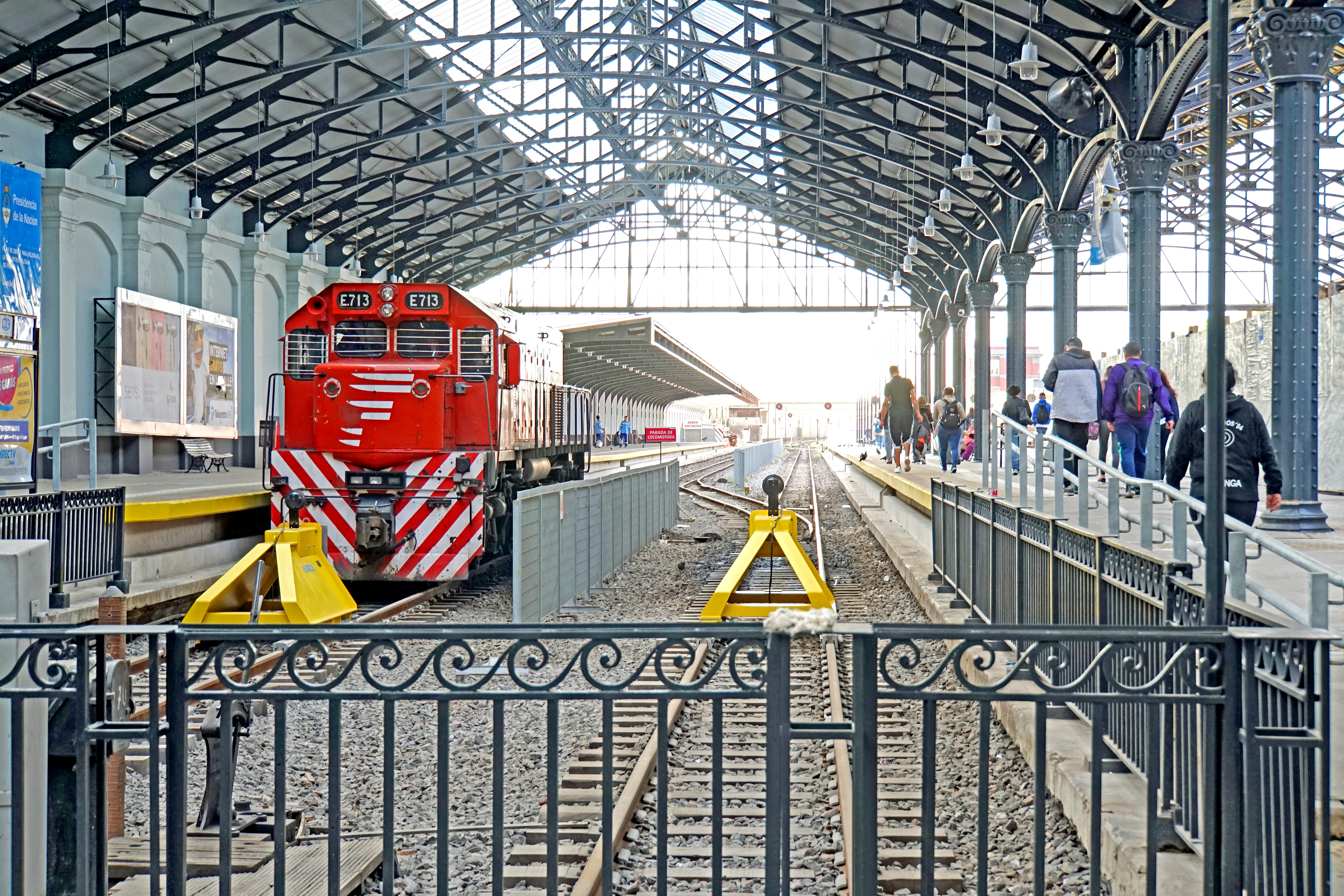
Indoor platform

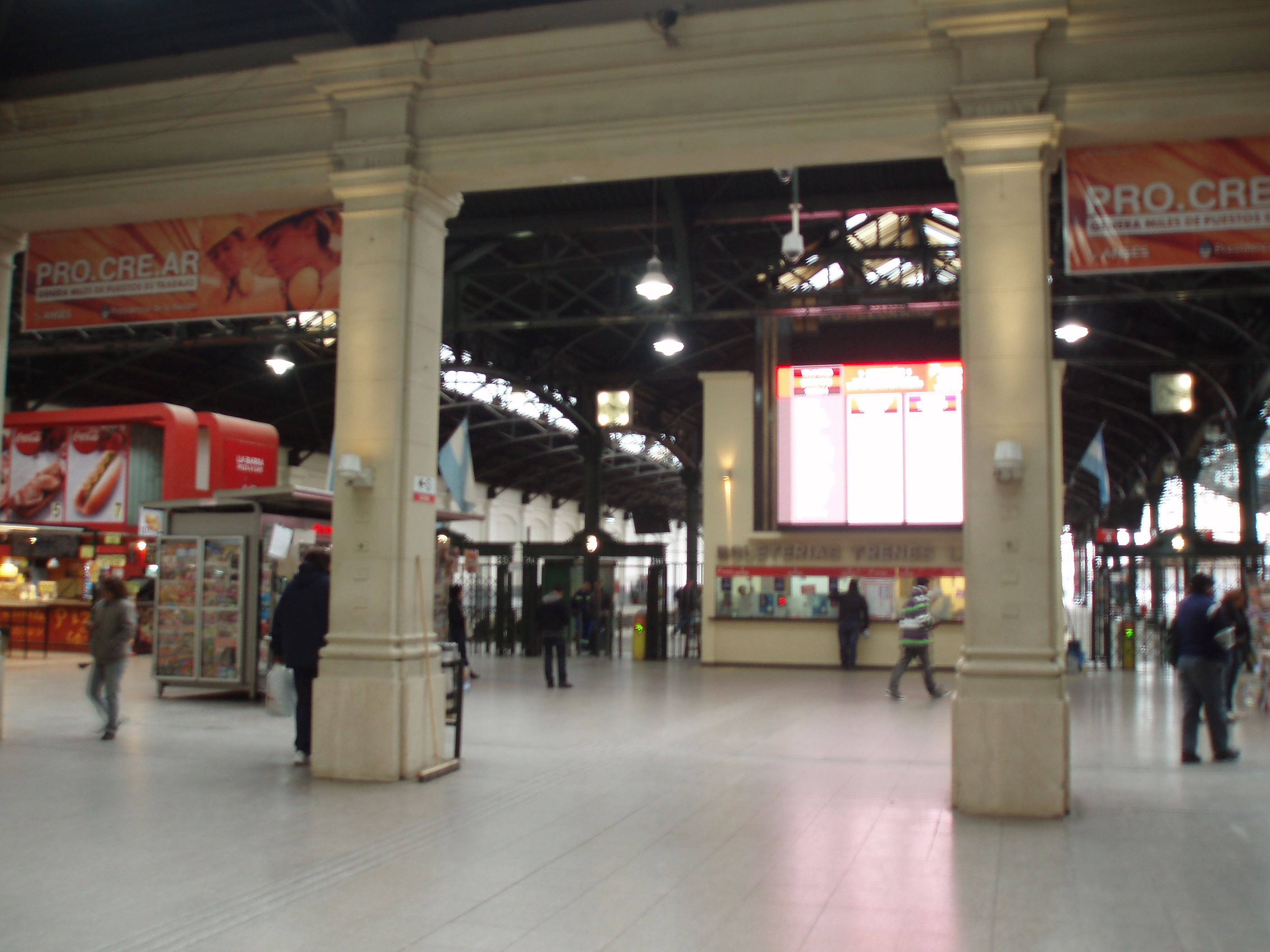
Hall

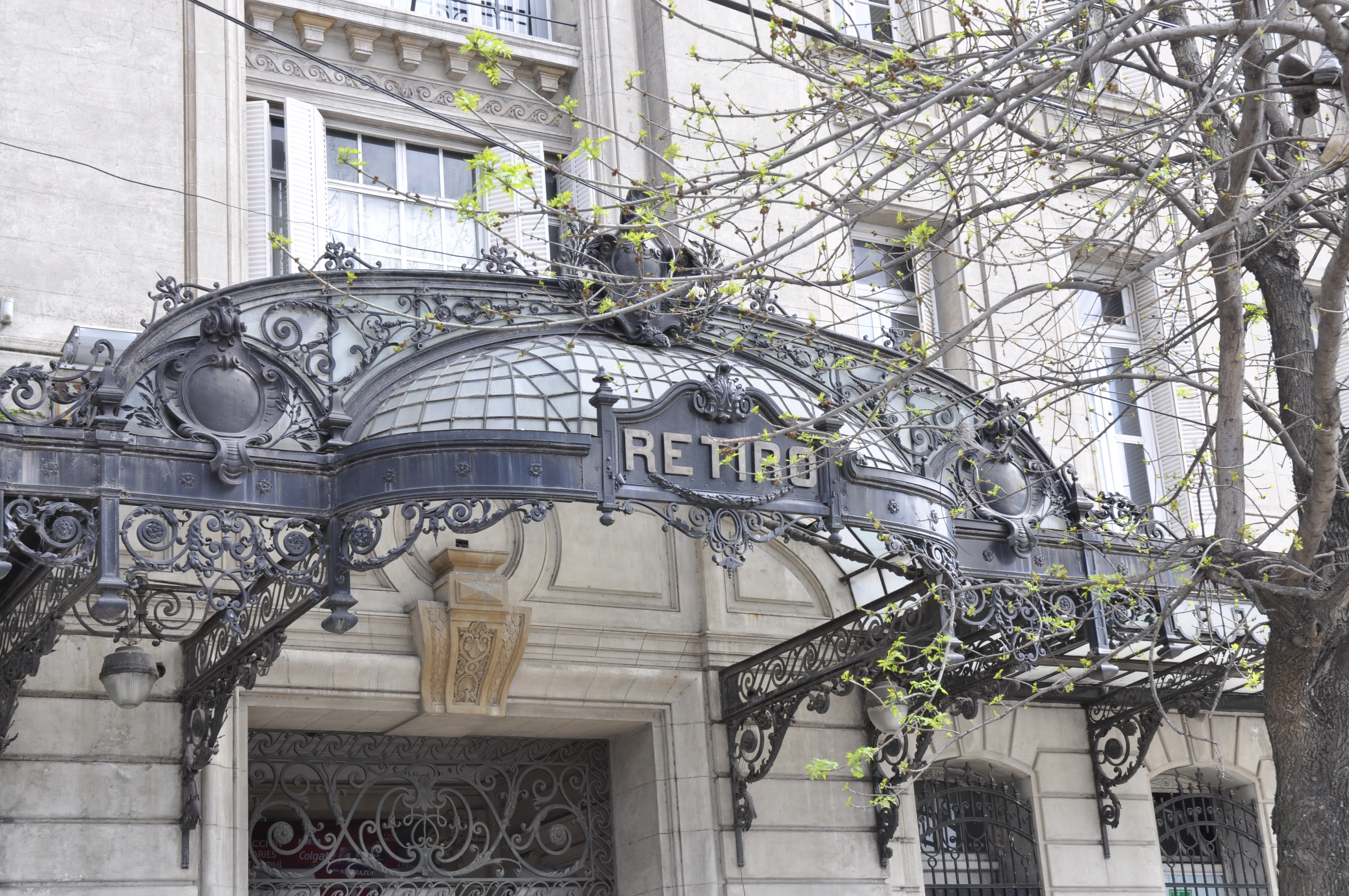
Eaves

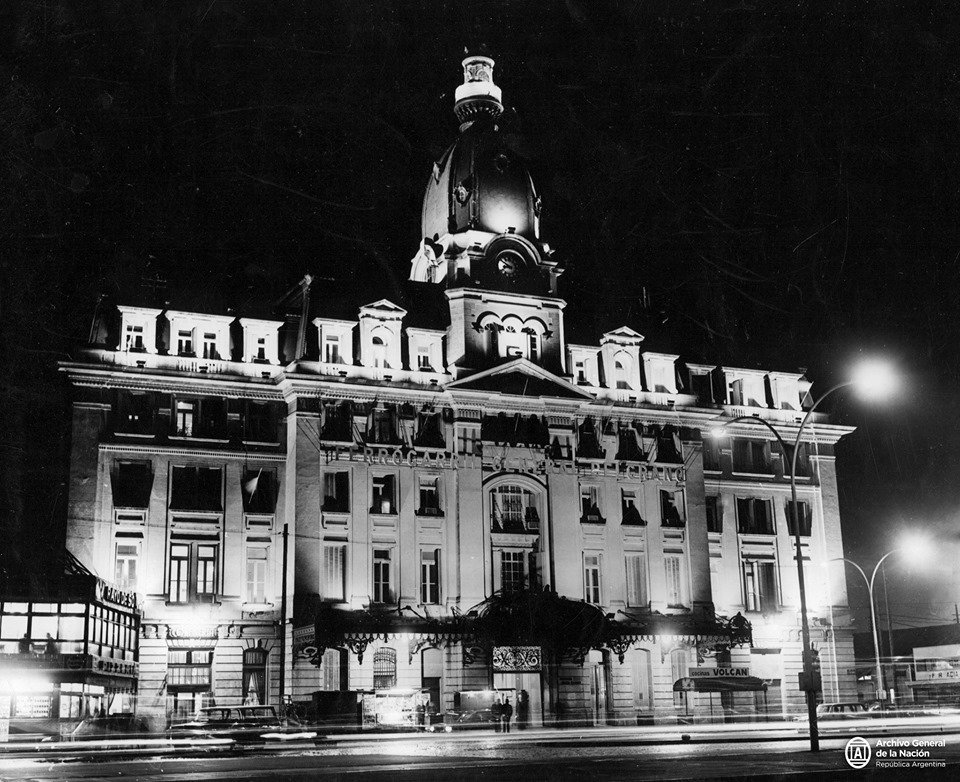
Night view
