= Retiro San Martín railway station =

Railway station in Buenos Aires, Argentina

Retiro San Martín
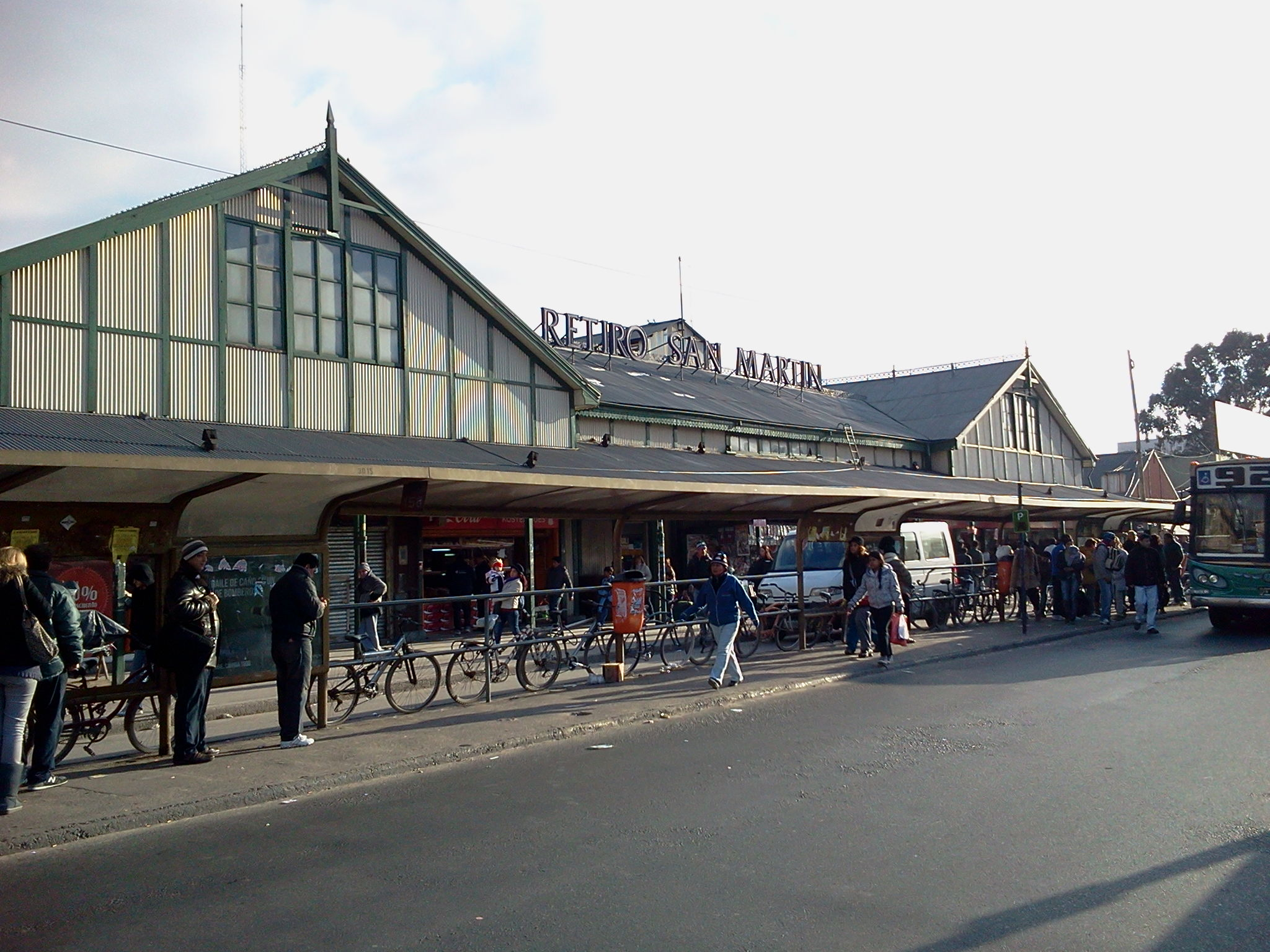
- Station facade

General information
- Location: Av. Ramos Mejía 1500, Buenos Aires; Argentina
- Coordinates: 34°35′25.8″S 58°22′33.96″W
- System: Inter-city & Commuter rails
- Owner: Government of Argentina
- Operator: Trenes Argentinos
- Line: San Martín Railway
- Platforms: 5
- Connections: Subte (under construction:); Retiro Belgrano; Retiro Mitre; Bus terminus

Other information
- Fare zone: Retiro, Buenos Aires

History
- Opened: 1912; 114 years ago
Location
- Location within Buenos Aires Location within Argentina Location within South America

Retiro-San Martín, or simply Retiro, is one of the six large mainline railway station termini in Buenos Aires, Argentina. Located in the neighborhood of Retiro, it serves as the terminal station for the San Martín Line that runs local trains to the northwestern suburbs of the Buenos Aires metropolitan area. It also functions as terminal station for the national train General San Martín Railway.

== Overview ==
Retiro San Martín is the terminus for the San Martín Railway, and lies between Retiro Belgrano station and Retiro bus station (Terminal de Omnibus), the principal long-distance bus terminal in Buenos Aires.

Retiro San Martín is accessible by the C line of the Buenos Aires Metro system and by numerous local public bus services. The station will also be accessible by both Line E and Line H of the metro once their extensions are complete.

== History ==
The station was inaugurated in 1912 by the Buenos Aires and Pacific Railway (BAP), as part of the extension of the service from Palermo through the city with brick bridges. The building built then and currently stands, consisted of a pre-assembled structure of iron, wood and metal that should work provisionally until the construction of a masonry building of monumental appearance, similar to other station buildings in the area. However, this building was never built.

== Services ==
The station is the terminus of commuter and suburban trains to Dr. Domingo Cabred (in Luján Partido), and Alberdi (in Leandro N. Alem Partido); both in the north-western area of Buenos Aires Province. The line to Alberdi, via Junín, is operated by Trenes Argentinos.

Until 10 March 1993, the year of abolition of long-distance services of Ferrocarriles Argentinos, the long-distance trains departing from Retiro San Martín reached San Luis, Mendoza, San Juan and Villa Dolores.

== Historic operators ==
Operator	Period
(United Kingdom) Buenos Aires and Pacific Railway	1912–48
(Argentina) Ferrocarriles Argentinos	1948–91
(Argentina) FEMESA (Note: Temporary operator prior to the privatization of commuter rail services.)	1991–94
(Argentina) Metropolitano	1994–2005
(Argentina) UGOFE (Note: Temporary operator after the Government revoked concession to Metropolitano.)	2005–14
(Argentina) Corredores Ferroviarios	2014–15
(Argentina) Trenes Argentinos Operaciones	2015–present

== Gallery ==
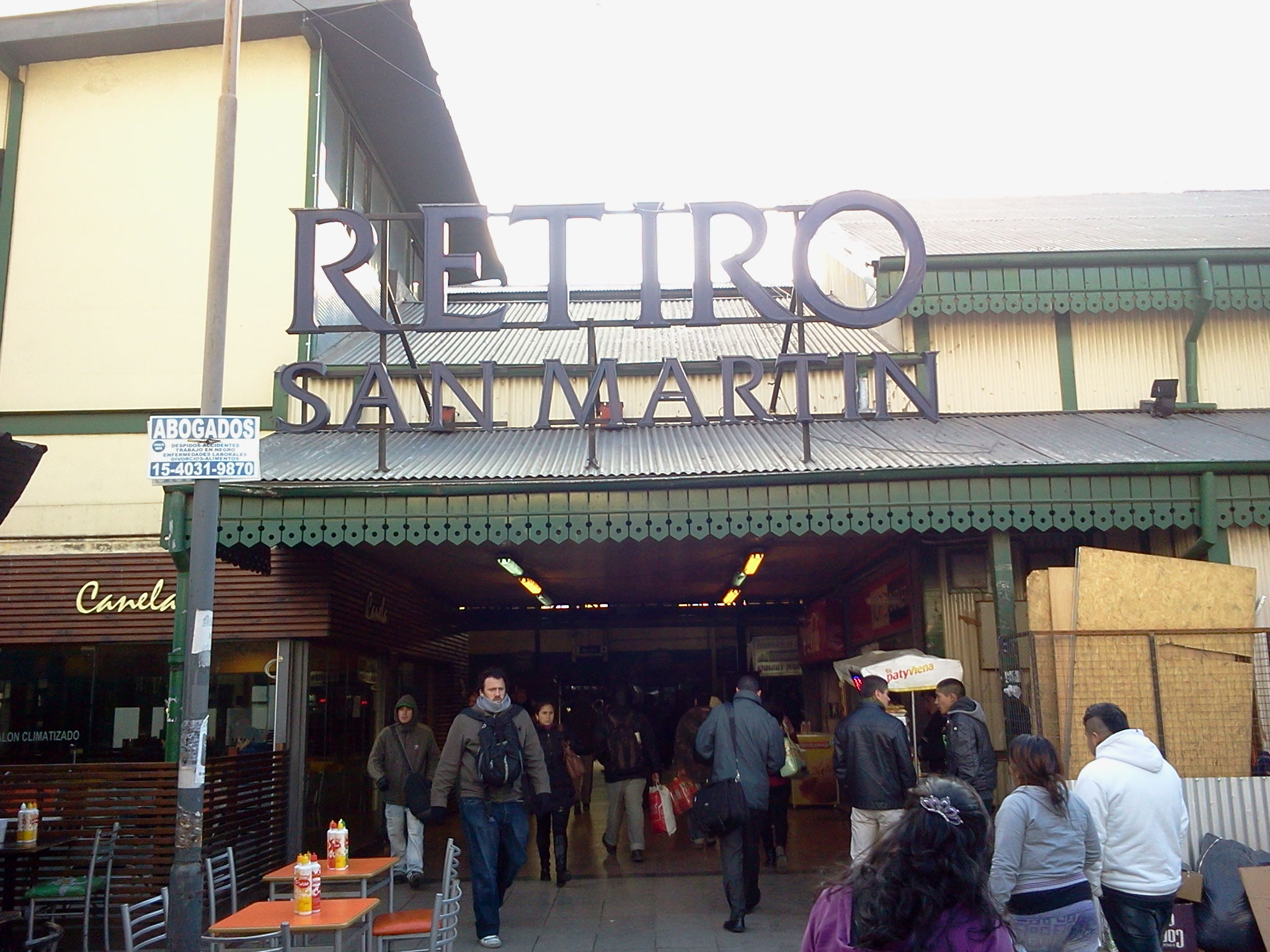
Secondary station entrance

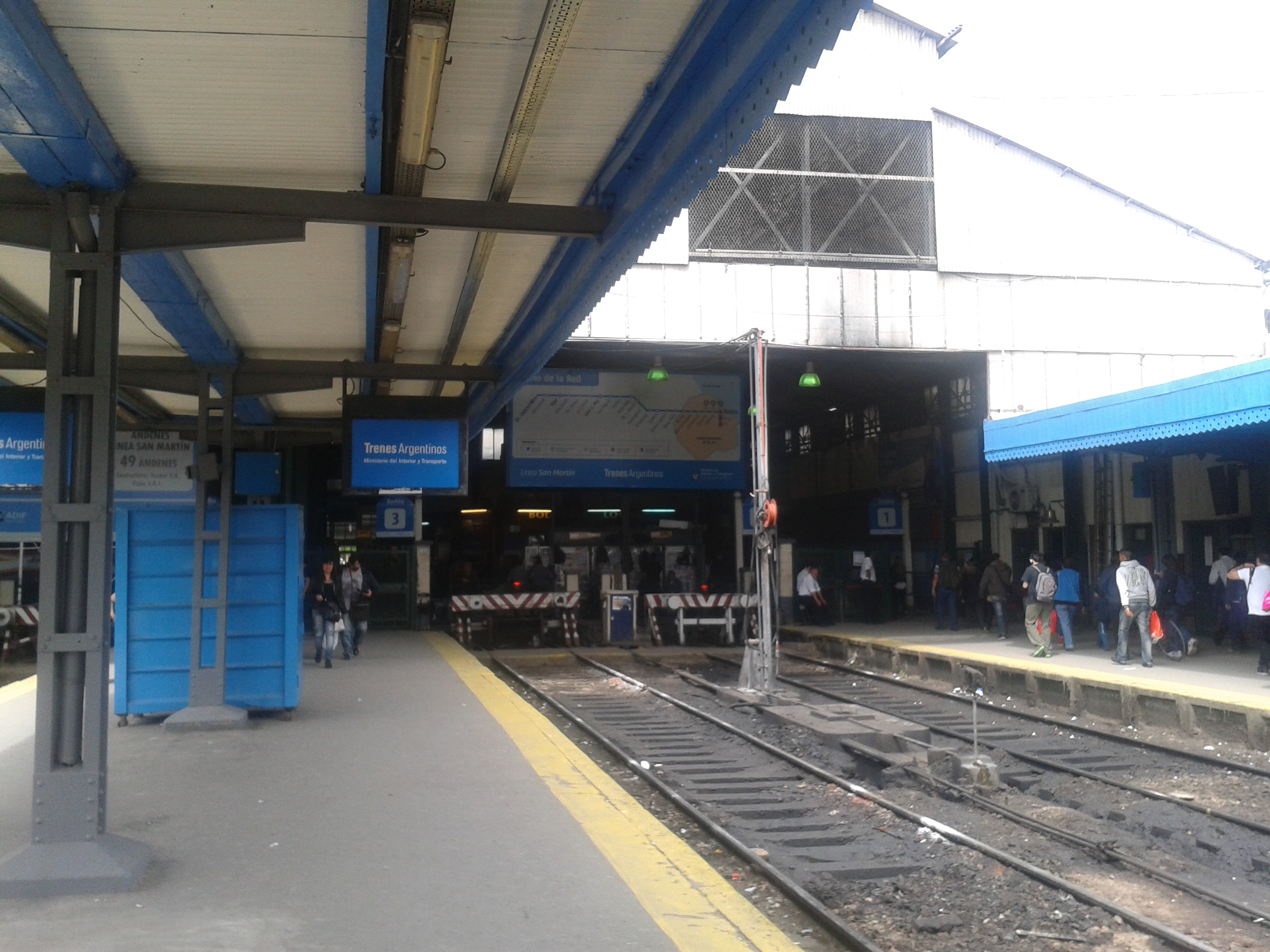
Platforms 2 and 3

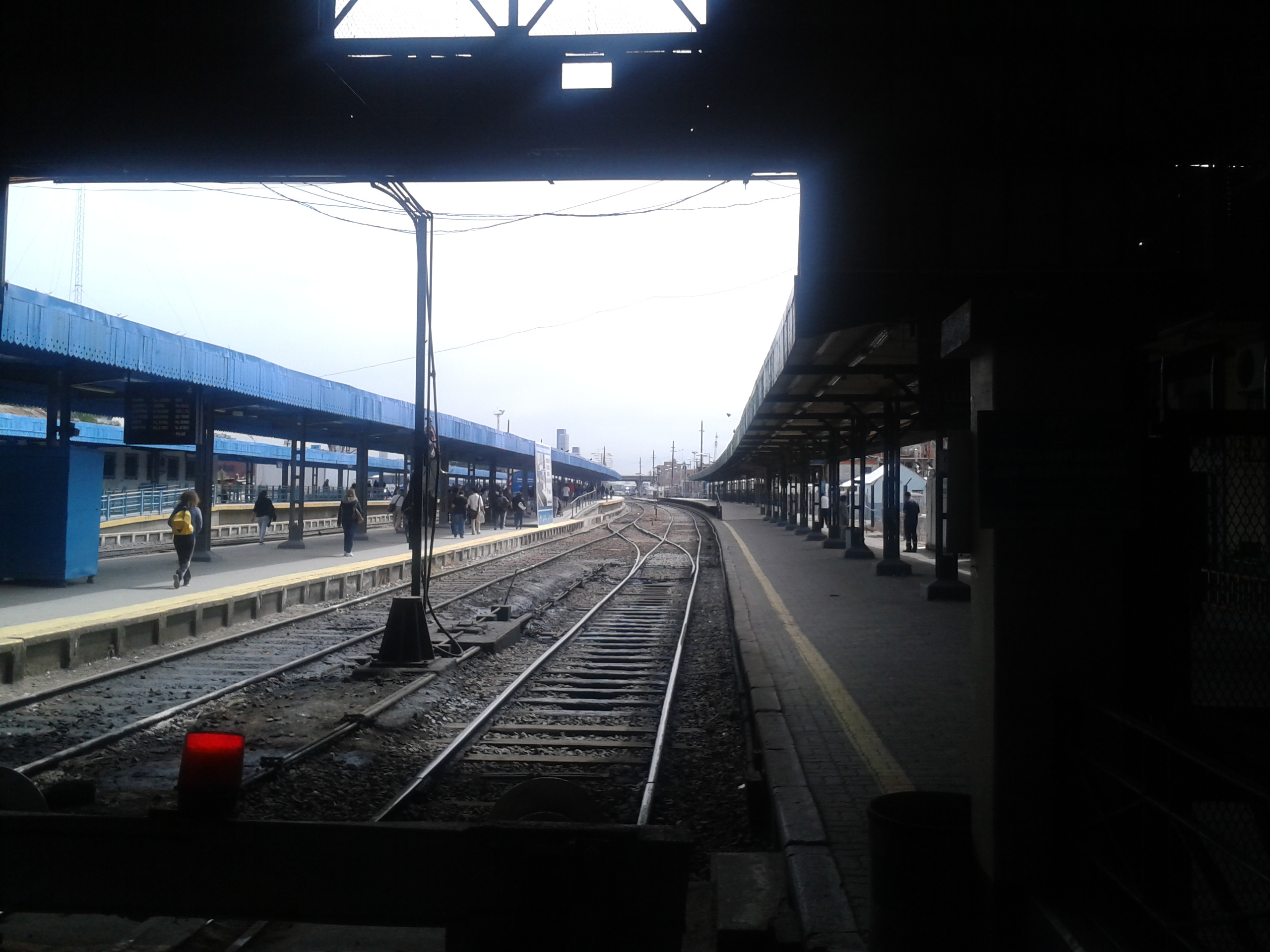
Platform 5

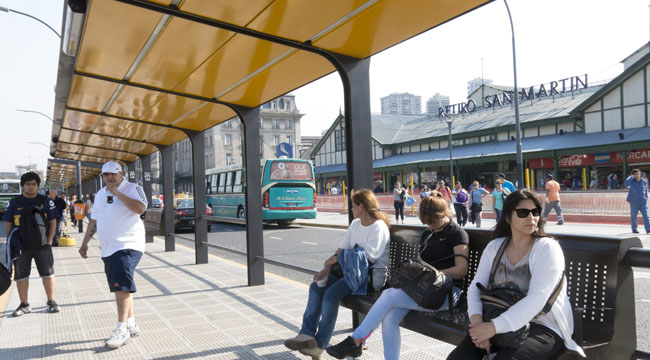
Passengers waiting for buses outside the station
