= Line C (Buenos Aires Underground) =

Rapid transit line of Buenos Aires

Line C

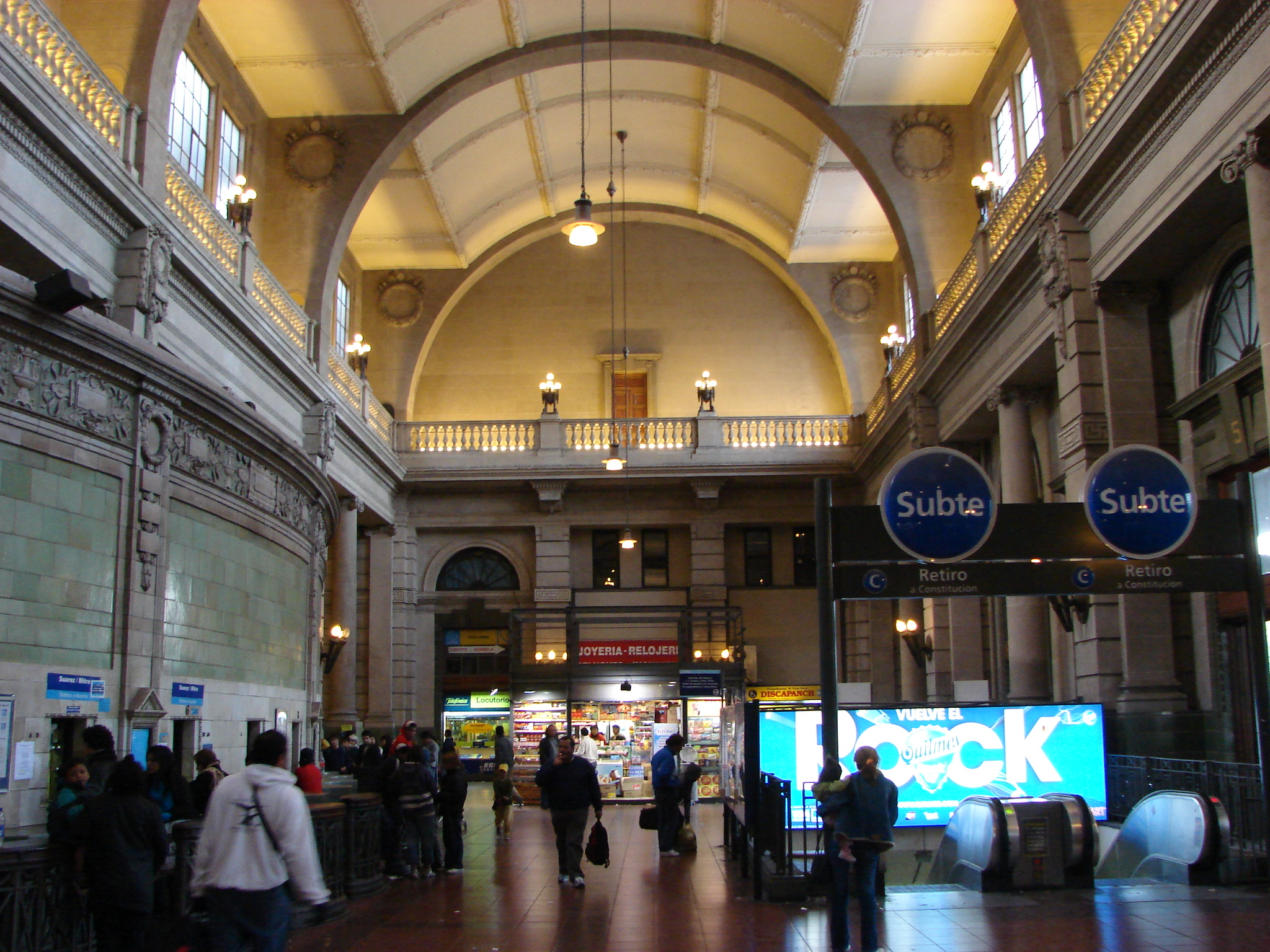
- Entrance to Retiro Station

Overview
- Termini: Retiro; Constitución
- Stations: 9

Service
- Type: Rapid transit
- System: Buenos Aires Underground
- Operator: Emova
- Rolling stock: 200 series · 5000 series
- Daily ridership: 86,657 (2024)

History
- Opened: 9 November 1934; 91 years ago
- Last extension: 1936

Technical
- Line length: 4.3 km (2.7 mi)
- Character: Underground
- Track gauge: 1,435 mm (4 ft 8 1/2 in)
- Electrification: Overhead line, 1,500 V DC

Line C of the Buenos Aires Underground, that runs from Retiro to Constitución terminus, opened on 9 November 1934, and it has a length of 4.3 km (2.7 mi). It runs under Lima Sur, Bernardo de Irigoyen, Carlos Pellegrini, Esmeralda, la Plaza San Martín and Avenida Ramos Mejia streets. It not only connects to every other line on the system (with the exception of Line H, which it is planned will be connected at a later date), but its termini at Retiro and Constitución also connect it to some of the most important commuter rail networks in Buenos Aires, such as the Mitre and Roca lines and also long-distance passenger services. It is thus an important artery in Buenos Aires' transport system. At the same time, it is also the shortest line in both terms of length and number of stations.

It was the third line of the network to provide rail services to the public, after Line A and Line B. Up until 2007 with the opening of line H, it was the only line in the system providing a north–south service.

Line C map

== History ==
The line was constructed by the Compañía Hispano Argentina de Obras Públicas y Finanzas (CHADOPyF, Hispanic-Argentine Company for Public Works and Finances), headed by a Spanish nobleman, Rafael Benjumea, the Count of Guadalhorce. This company took on the task because the Great Depression of the 1930s meant that the Anglo-Argentine Tramways Company (which owned most of the then vast tram network in the city) pulled out of its construction. The line was subsequently opened in 1934 and extended from the present terminus at Constitución to Diagonal Norte in the centre of the city. The stretch from Diagonal Norte to its present terminus at Retiro was opened in 1936 and marked the last expansion of the line, which remains the only line not to be extended since then.

On opening, the stations were decorated with murals depicting rural Spain created by Argentine artists Martín S. Noel and Manuel Escasani, as well as some stations reflecting Moorish influences and were painted with gold powder. It had advanced technology for the time, such as Automatic Train Stop (ATS).

When Line E was opened in 1938, its original terminus was shared with that of Line C at Constitución. However, Line Es' route was altered in 1966 for the lines to meet instead at Independencia, where they still do so to this day. With the extensions of Line E and Line H, they now meet Line C at Retiro, where all three terminate.

Siemens has modernised the signalling systems on the line, at a cost of $18 million which included the use of Communications-based train control (CBTC) in order to improve the line's frequency and potentially open up the possibility of automatic trains in the future. The work was completed towards the end of 2016.

Aside from the signalling system, the line has had its stations refurbished, its rolling stock refurbished and ventilation improved, in part to compensate from the extra heat associated with the air conditioning units added to the trains. Major works took place at Constitución railway station to provide better transfers between the Roca Line, Line C and Metrobus Sur in the area, which includes the construction of a new underground annex to the station. Large segments of track, as well as switches, were replaced.

== Rolling stock ==
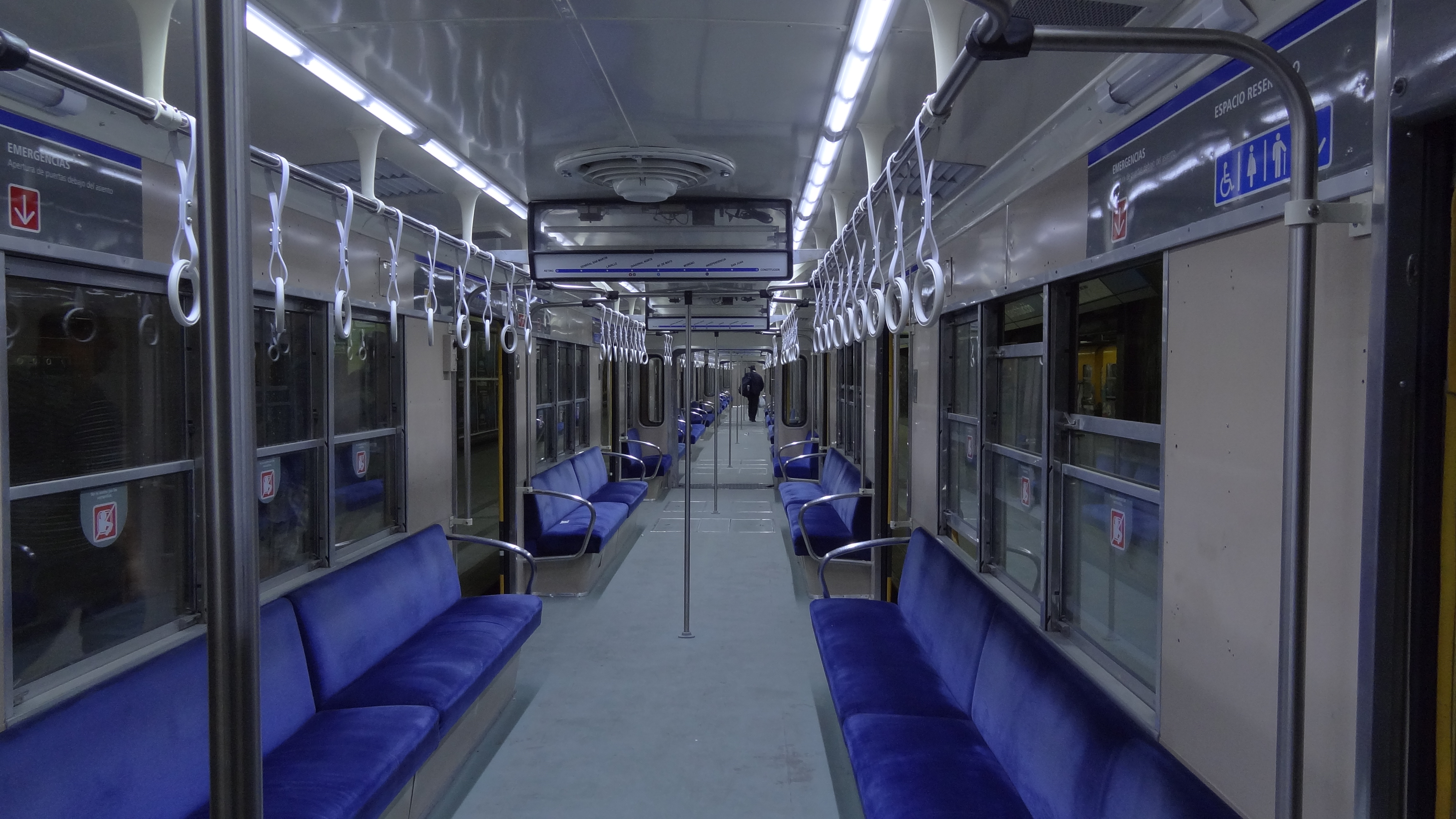
Interior of the Nagoya 300 Series rolling stock

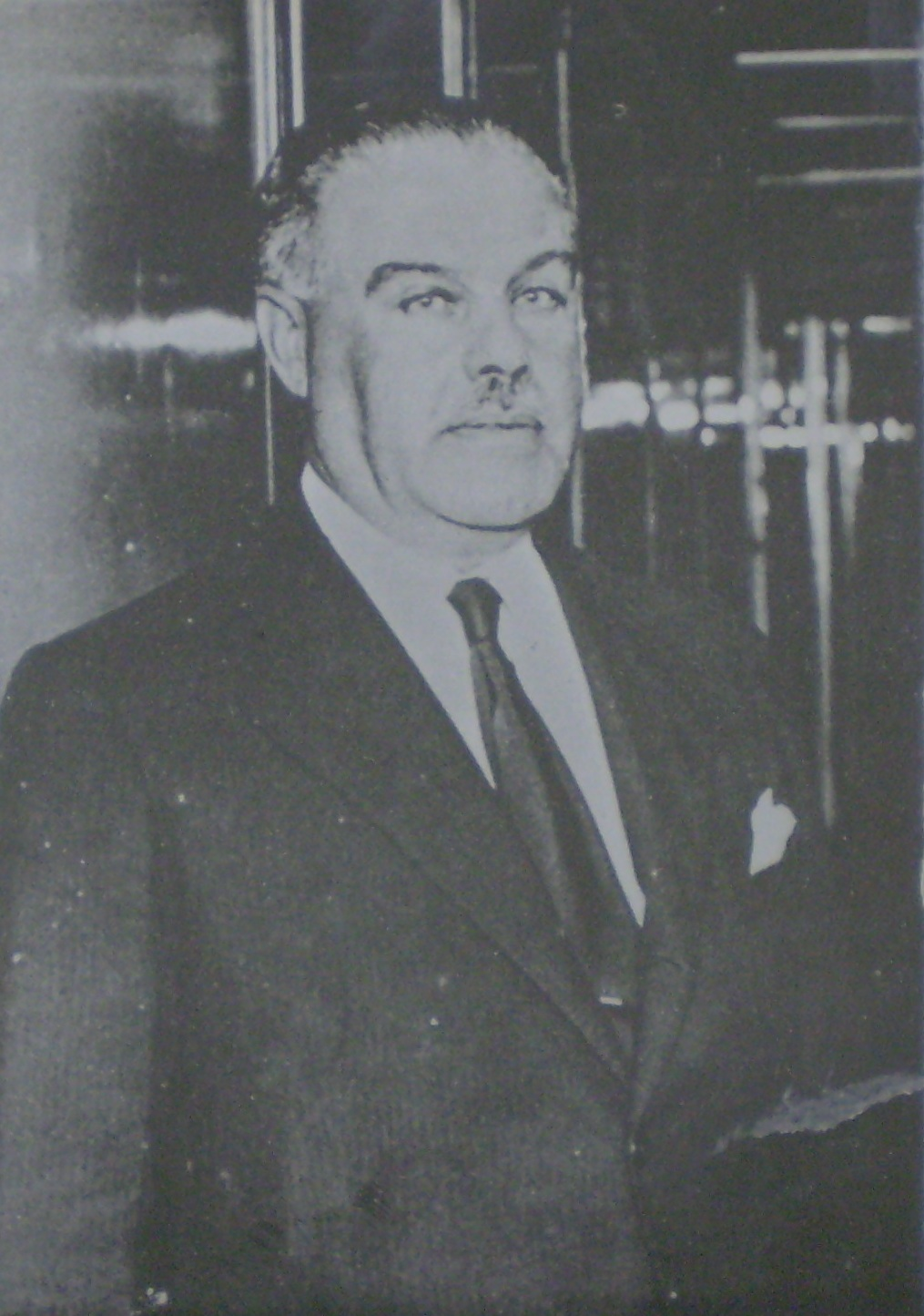
Rafael Benjumea, the Count of Guadalhorce, who oversaw the construction of the line.

When the line was first opened, it was served by Siemens-Schuckert Orenstein & Koppel rolling stock in its entirety until 2007. In 1999, trains were purchased from the Nagoya Municipal Subway but they ultimately ended up being used on Line D, and were then sent to Line C in 2007 as Line D acquired more new Alstom rolling stock and Line H was opened, meaning that the Siemens O&K trains were needed there as temporary stock until newer Alstom Metropolis trains arrived there.

In 2015, refurbished Nagoya Municipal Subway 5000 series rolling stock began to arrive, adding 50% capacity to the line's existing Nagoya trains and reducing journey times. Though the rolling stock was in very good condition and was further refurbished, the purchase was criticised by the Minister of the Interior and Transport, Florencio Randazzo, who accused the Municipal Government of buying dated rolling stock in contrast to the brand new rolling stock purchased by the Ministry for Buenos Aires' commuter rail network and Line A of the underground. Along with the purchase, the existing Nagoya rolling stock was refurbished with air conditioning. 200 Series trains were gradually introduced to the line beginning in 2018, slowly replacing the Nagoya 250/300/1200 Series cars until the final set was retired in 2020.

== Gallery ==
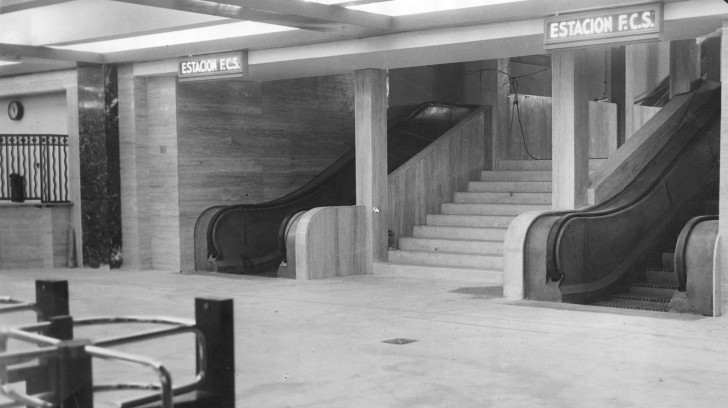
Exit to Constitución railway station c.1934

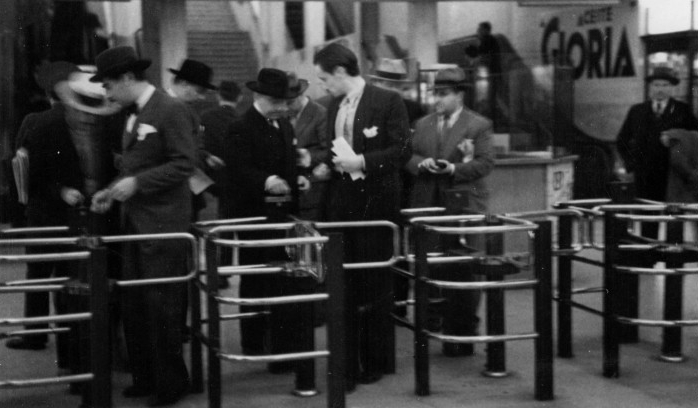
Passengers going through turnstiles on the line c.1934

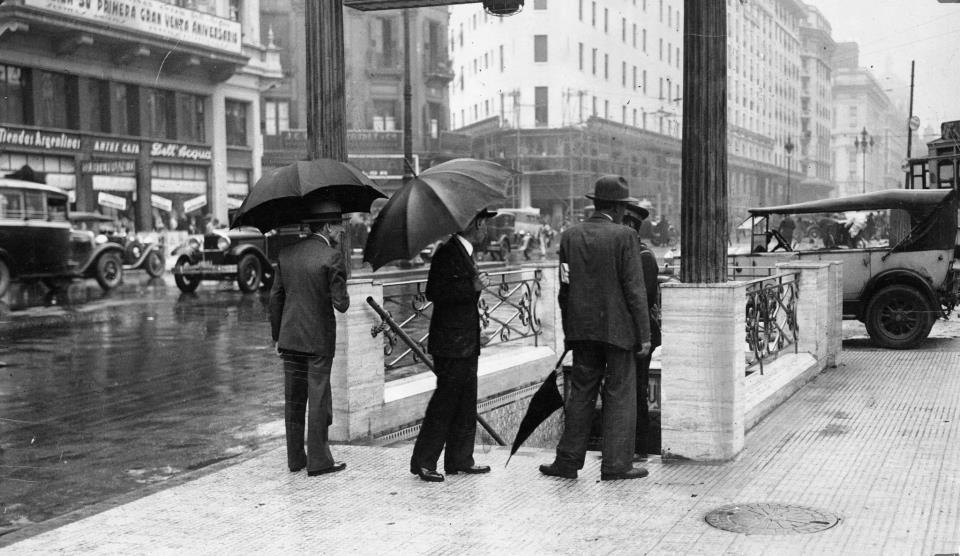
Entrance to Diagonal Norte station, c.1936

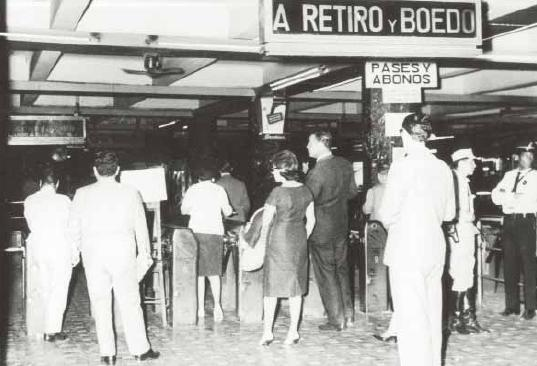
Passengers entering Line C from the former Line E station at Constitución

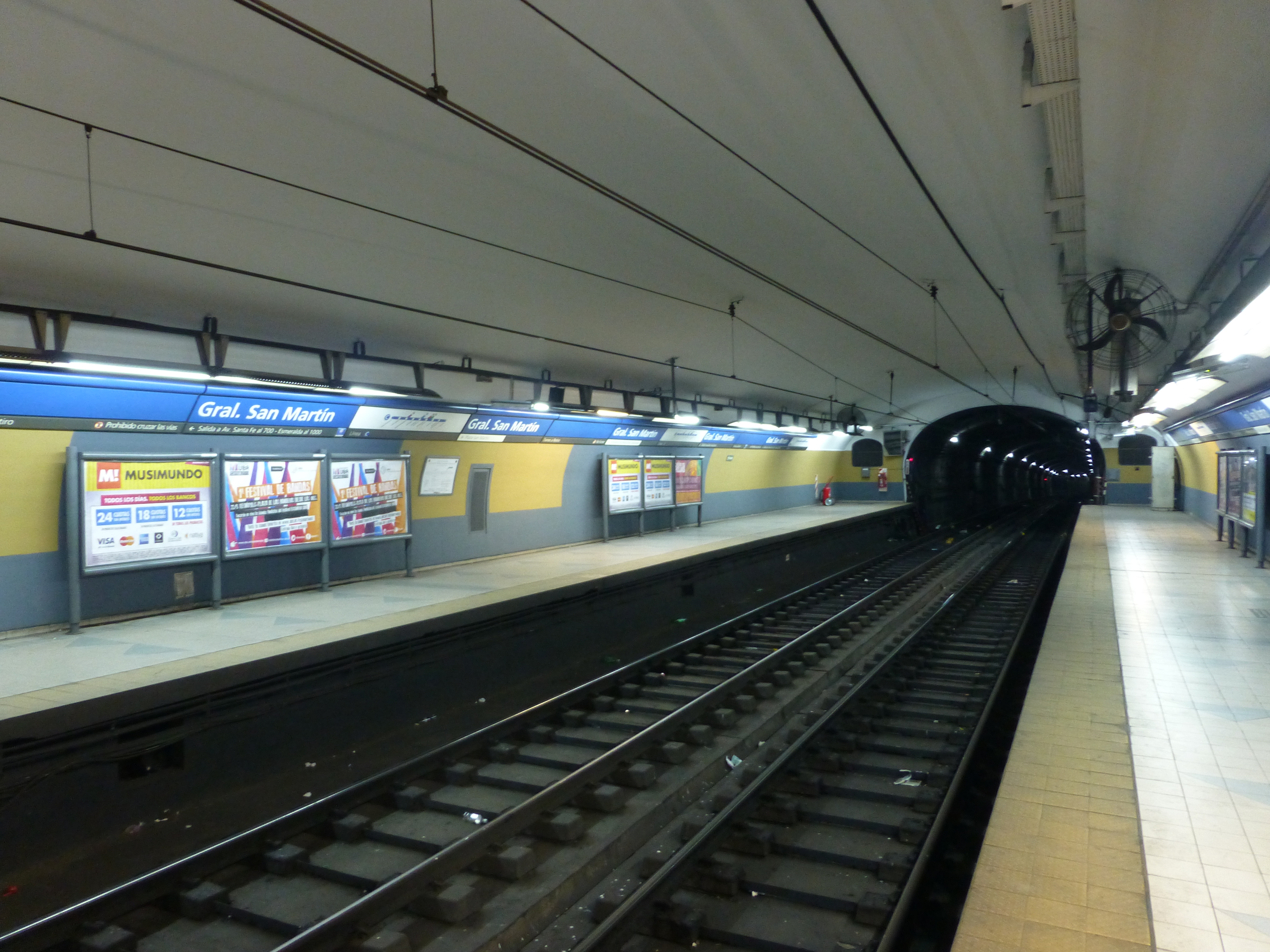
General San Martín station interior
