= Railway nationalisation in Argentina =

1948 acquisition of Argentinian railways

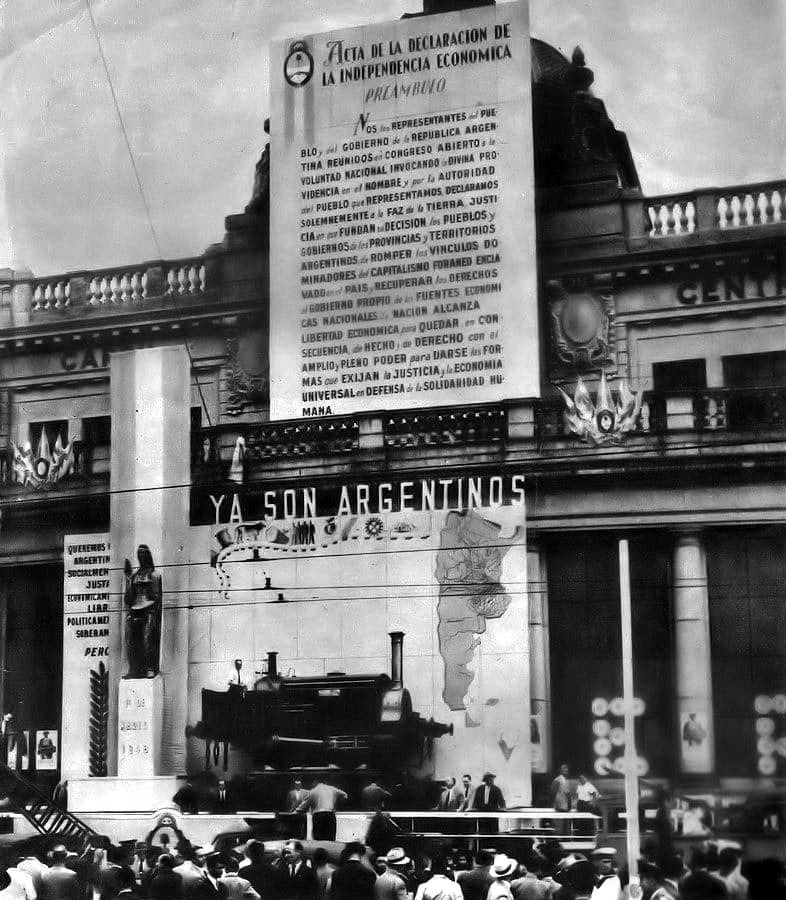
- Celebrations at Retiro (FCCA) train station
- Date: 1 March 1948; 78 years ago
- Location: Argentina
- Theme: Selling of the Argentine rail transport network to the Government of Argentina
- Cause: World War II; Financial problems
- Participants: British and French rail transport companies Government of Argentina

The railway nationalisation in Argentina occurred on 1 March 1948, during President Juan Perón's first term of office, when the seven British- and three French-owned railway companies then operating in Argentina were purchased by the state. These companies, together with those that were already state-owned, where grouped, according to their track gauge and locality, into a total of six state-owned companies which later became divisions of the state-owned holding company Ferrocarriles Argentinos.

== Background ==
In the latter half of the 19th century British and French-owned railway companies had played an important role in the economic development of Argentina. Between 1856 and 1914 the nation's railway network grew to become the largest in Latin America. The foreign investment provided by these companies had helped to transform Argentina from a relatively underdeveloped, rural country, with many isolated communities, into one which was becoming an increasingly prosperous agricultural producer and exporter.

The foreign-owned railway companies had developed under the protection of what was, at the time, Argentina's strong property-rights regime.

The rail networks of the various companies generally radiated inland from the major ports of Buenos Aires and Rosario and were primarily designed to speed the export of agricultural products from the provinces to European markets. The lack of interlinking between the many radial lines meant that the integration of the country’s interior was probably slower than it would have been had domestic needs been a priority.

During World War II, restrictions on the importation of railway equipment and materials prevented much-needed maintenance and investment. Consequently, by the time of nationalization in 1948, substantial sections of track, locomotives, and rolling stock required renewal. At the same time, the railways faced increasing competition from road transport as the national road network expanded and improved.

By 1948, during President Perón's first term in office, economic nationalism had gained considerable support in Argentina. For many Argentines who associated national ownership with greater economic independence, the foreign-owned railways had come to symbolize the influence of foreign powers over the country's economy.

== Details ==
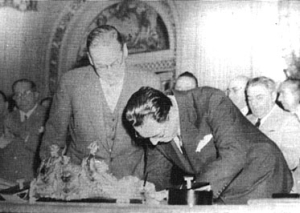
President Juan Perón (right) signs the nationalization of the British-owned railways with Ambassador Sir Reginald Leeper

Between 1936 and 1939, the formerly British-owned metre gauge Córdoba Central, Transandine and Central Chubut railways had already been nationalised. On 1 March 1948, the remaining British-owned railway companies in Argentina also passed into government ownership. These were the four broad gauge companies: BA Great Southern, Central Argentine, BA & Pacific and the BA Western; the standard gauge companies Entre Ríos and Argentine North Eastern; and the Buenos Aires Midland Railway, the only metre gauge company.

A crowd celebrating the nationalisation in front of Retiro station, covered by newspaper Crítica, which described the event as a "mayor day"

The official transfer to the Argentine government on 1 March of some 24,458 km (15,197 mi) of British-owned railways, representing 57% of the total railway network, took place amid widespread celebrations. These included a mass demonstration in support of the transfer in Buenos Aires' Plaza Británica, in front of the Retiro railway terminus.

British shareholders were compensated through the cancellation of their US$500 million debt to the Central Bank of Argentina, together with a cash payment of US$100 million. The cash payment proved controversial, as it had not previously been disclosed during the negotiations. When pressed on the issue, President Perón explained that the premium had been paid for "sentimental reasons".

Later in 1948, the three French-owned railway companies were also nationalised: the broad-gauge Rosario & Puerto Belgrano, and the metre-gauge Compañía General de Buenos Aires and Provincial de Santa Fe. After nationalisation, the entire Argentine railway network was grouped into six divisions according to track gauge and geographical location.

The divisions were named after distinguished Argentine presidents and national heroes: José de San Martín, Manuel Belgrano, Domingo Sarmiento, Justo José de Urquiza, Bartolomé Mitre and Julio A. Roca. Alongside the former British- and French-owned companies, the existing Argentine state-owned railways were incorporated into "Ferrocarriles Argentinos", the state-owned company created after nationalisation to manage the entire railway network.

The list of companies taken over by each division was as follows:

Ferrocarriles Argentinos
Former company	Origin	Provinces covered	Renamed (railway division)
Central Northern (Note: The Central Northern had previously taken over North Argentine Railway in 1909.)	ARG	La Rioja, Catamarca, Córdoba, Tucumán, Formosa, Chaco, Santiago del Estero, Salta, Jujuy	Belgrano
Provincial de Buenos Aires	FRA	Buenos Aires	Belgrano
Provincial de Santa Fe	FRA	Santa Fe, Chaco, Córdoba	Belgrano
Midland	UK	Buenos Aires	Belgrano
Compañía General de Buenos Aires	FRA	Buenos Aires, Santa Fe	Belgrano
Córdoba Central (Note: The Central Córdoba had previously taken over the Córdoba North Western Railway in 1901.)	UK	Santa Fe, Córdoba, Santiago del Estero	Belgrano
Transandine	ARG	Mendoza	Belgrano
Central Argentine (Note: The Central Argentine had previously acquired the BA Northern (1888), BA & Rosario (1902) and Santa Fe Western (1900), and a part of Andean railways.)	UK	Buenos Aires, Santa Fe, Córdoba, Sgo. del Estero, Tucumán	Mitre
Buenos Aires Central	ARG	Buenos Aires, Santa Fe	Urquiza
Argentine North Eastern (Note: The Argentine North Eastern had acquired the East Argentine in 1907, and the Entre Ríos Railway in 1915.)	UK	Entre Ríos, Corrientes, Misiones	Urquiza
Económico Correntino	ARG	Corrientes Province	Urquiza
BA Great Southern (Note: The BAGSR had acquired Bahía Blanca & North Western and Buenos Aires & Ensenada railways before being built by the Argentine state)	UK	Buenos Aires, La Pampa, Río Negro, Neuquén	Roca
Patagónicos (Note: The Patagonian Railway included the Central Chubut, Comodoro Rivadavia, Puerto Deseado, and San Antonio-N. Huapi railway companies.)	ARG	Río Negro, Neuquén, Chubut, Santa Cruz	Roca
Rosario and Pto. Belgrano	FRA	Santa Fe, Buenos Aires	Roca
BA & Pacific (Note: The BAP had previously acquired the Villa María & Rufino (1900), Argentine Great Western Railway (1907), and a part of Andean (1909) railways.)	UK	Buenos Aires, Santa Fe, Córdoba, Mendoza, San Luis	San Martín
BA Western (Note: The company had previously acquired a part of Andean Railway in 1887.)	UK (Note: Originally an Argentine company, the BAWR had been purchased by British in 1890.)	Buenos Aires, La Pampa, Córdoba, San Luis, Mendoza	Sarmiento

=== Railway divisions network ===
After the nationalisation, maps of the six railway divisions managed by state-owned Ferrocarriles Argentinos were as follows:

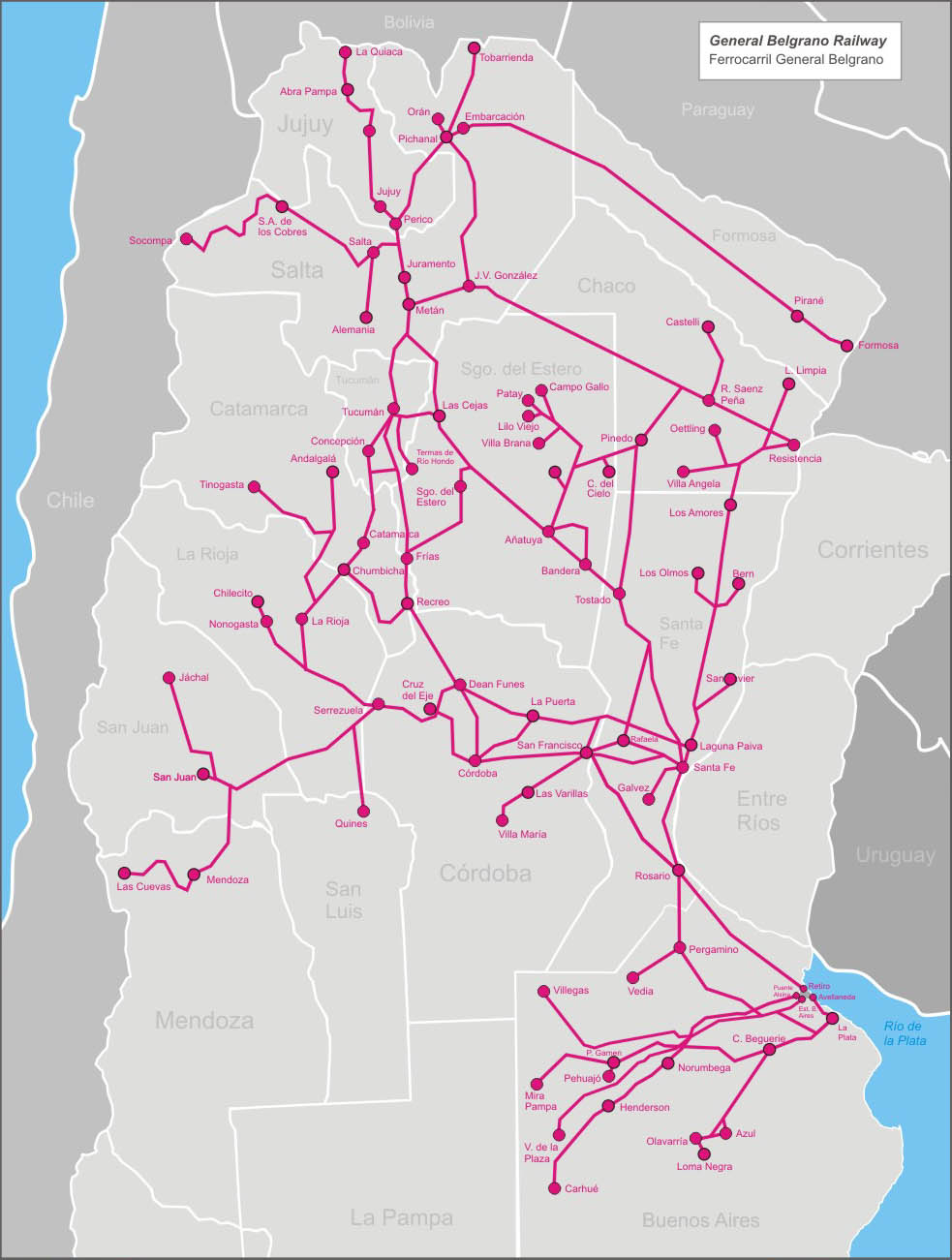
Belgrano

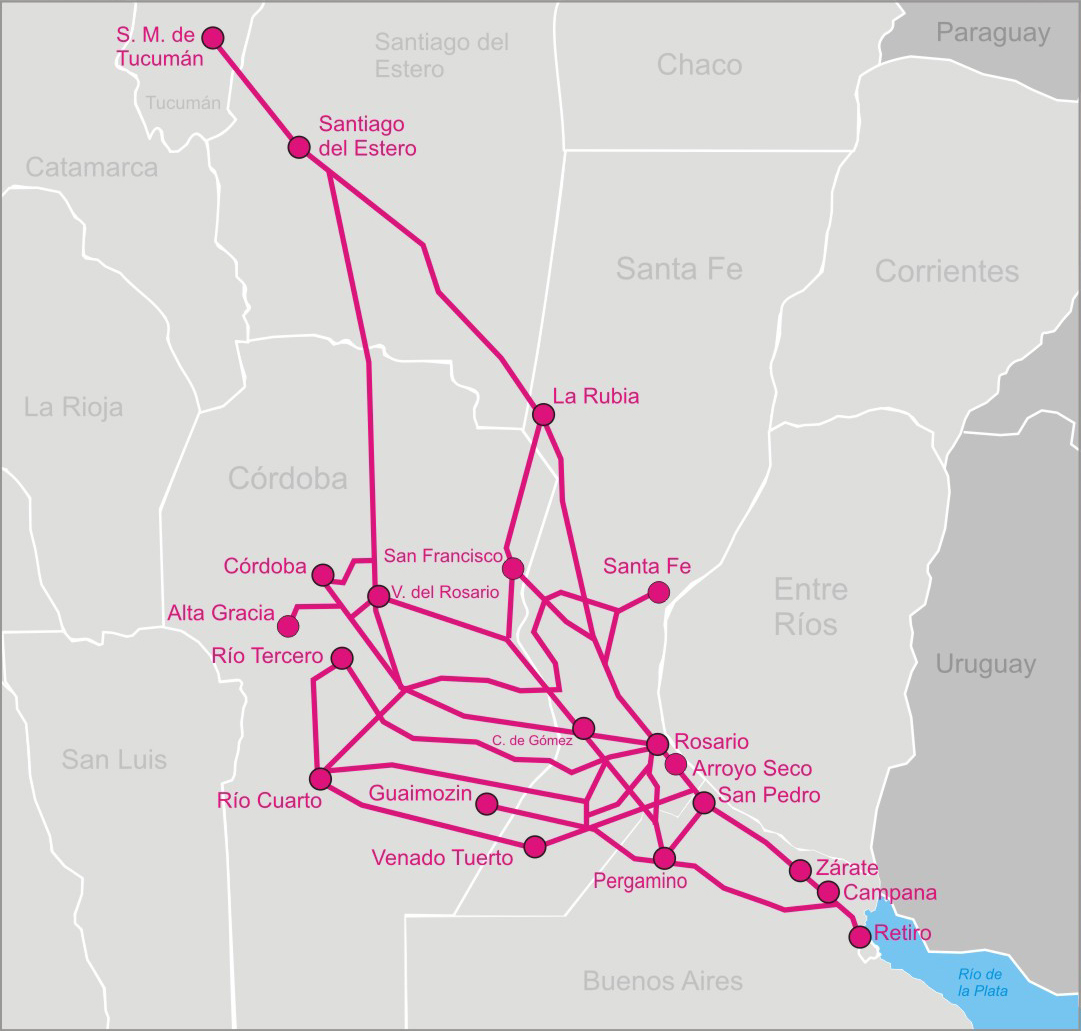
Mitre

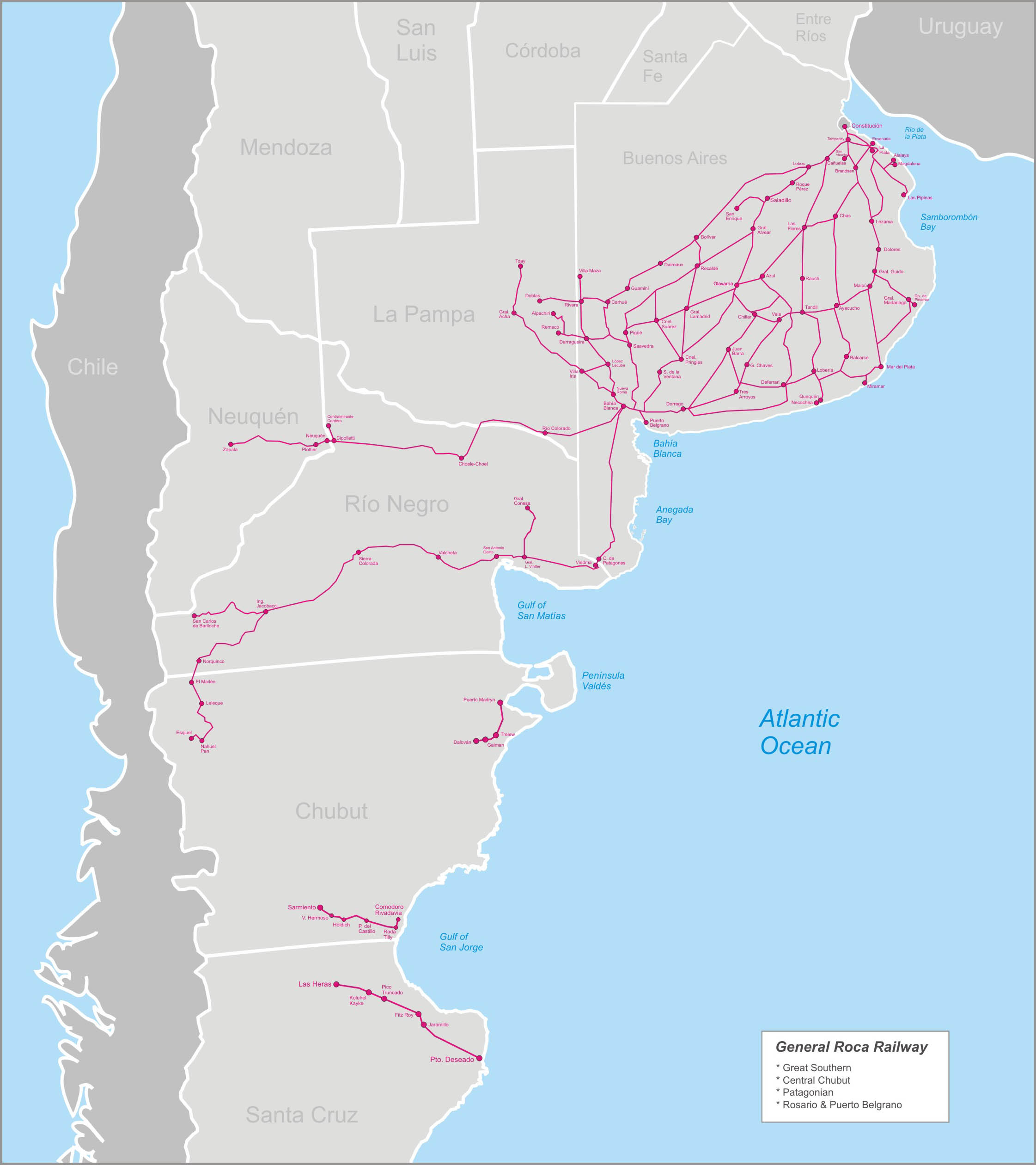
Roca

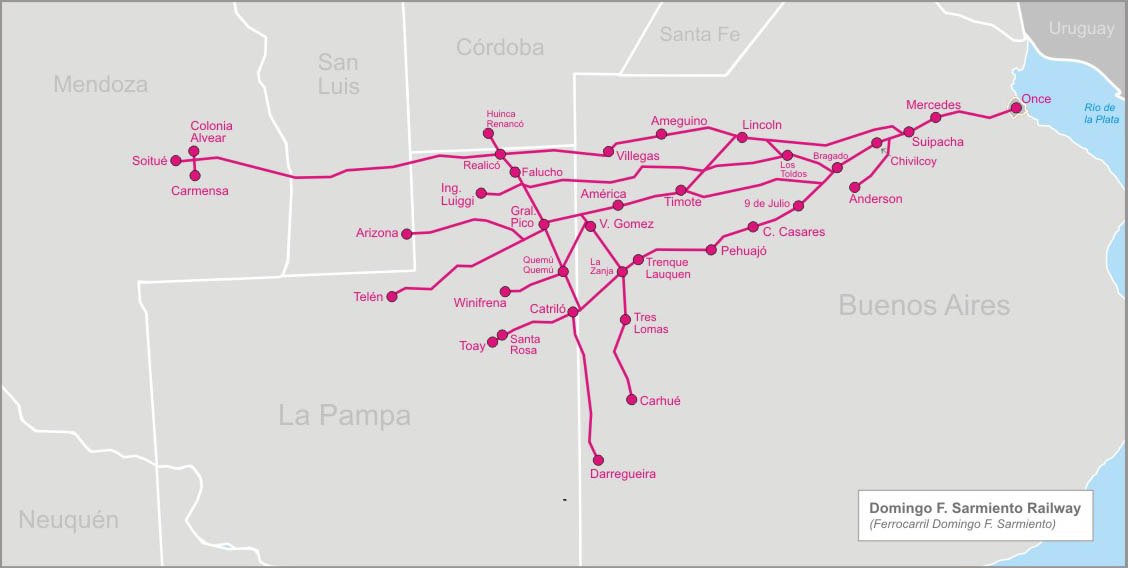
Sarmiento

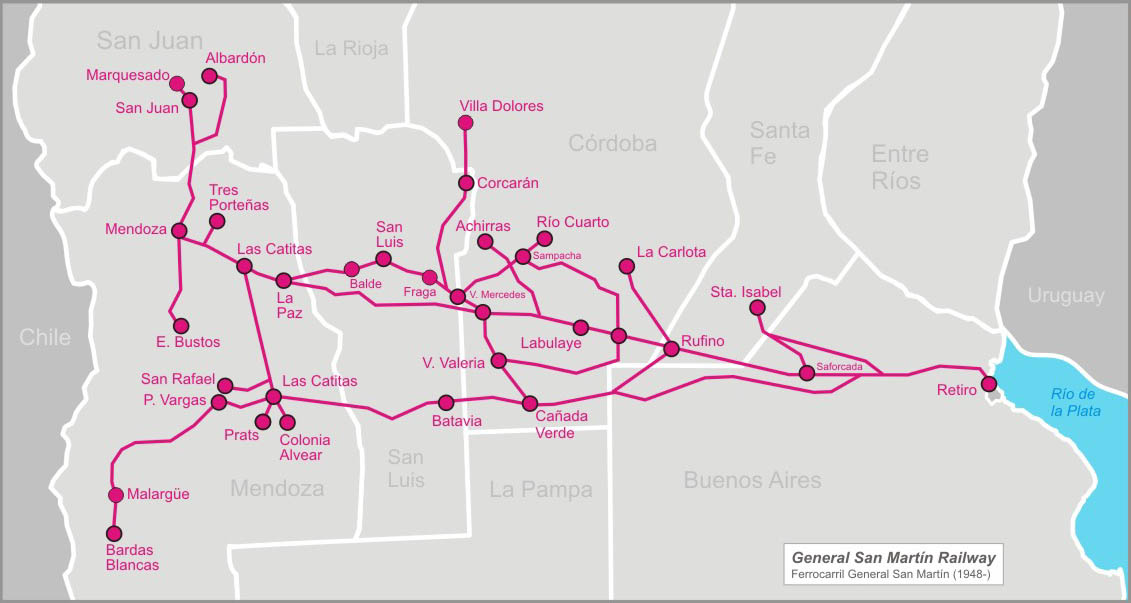
San Martín

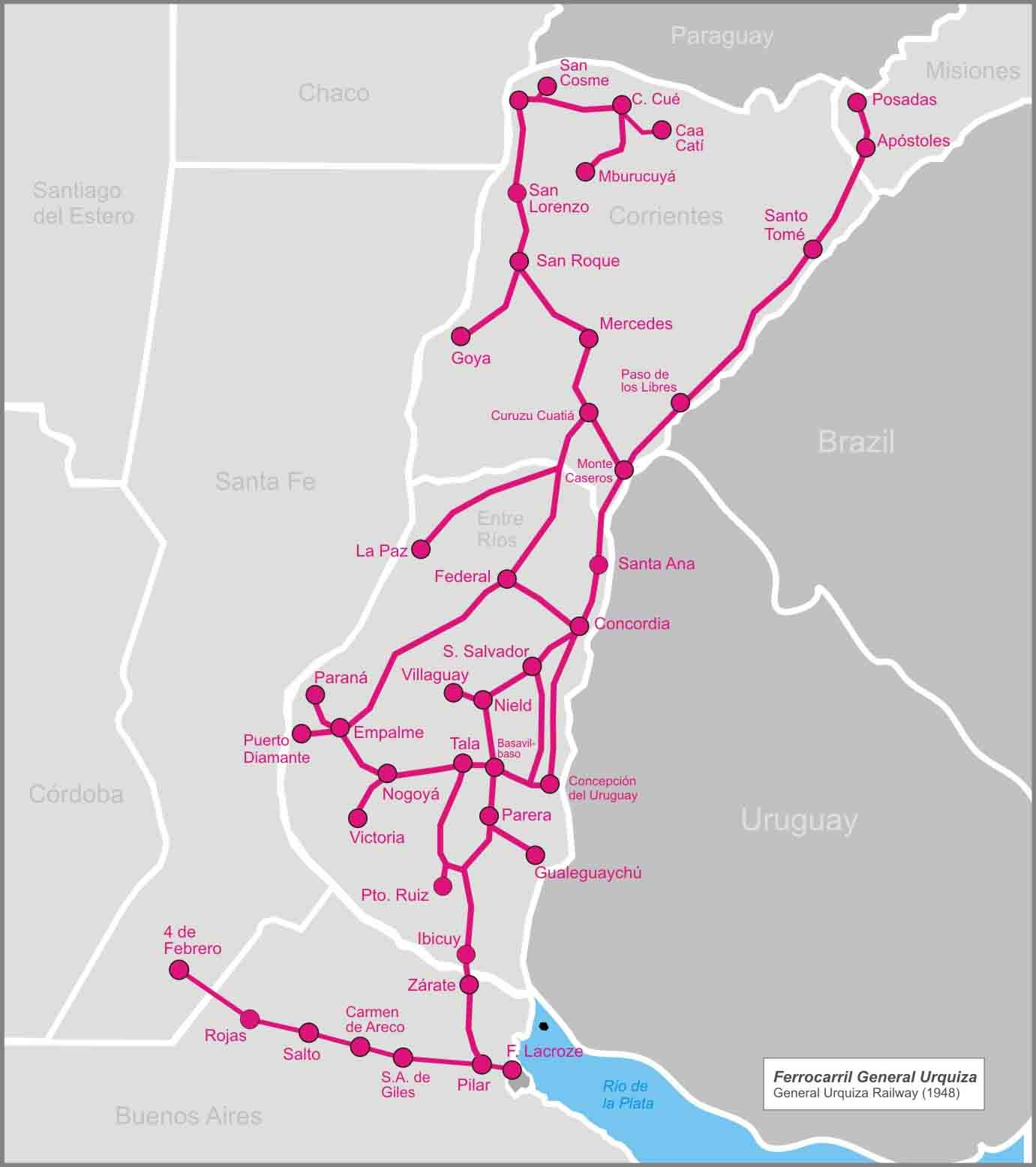
Urquiza

== Aftermath ==
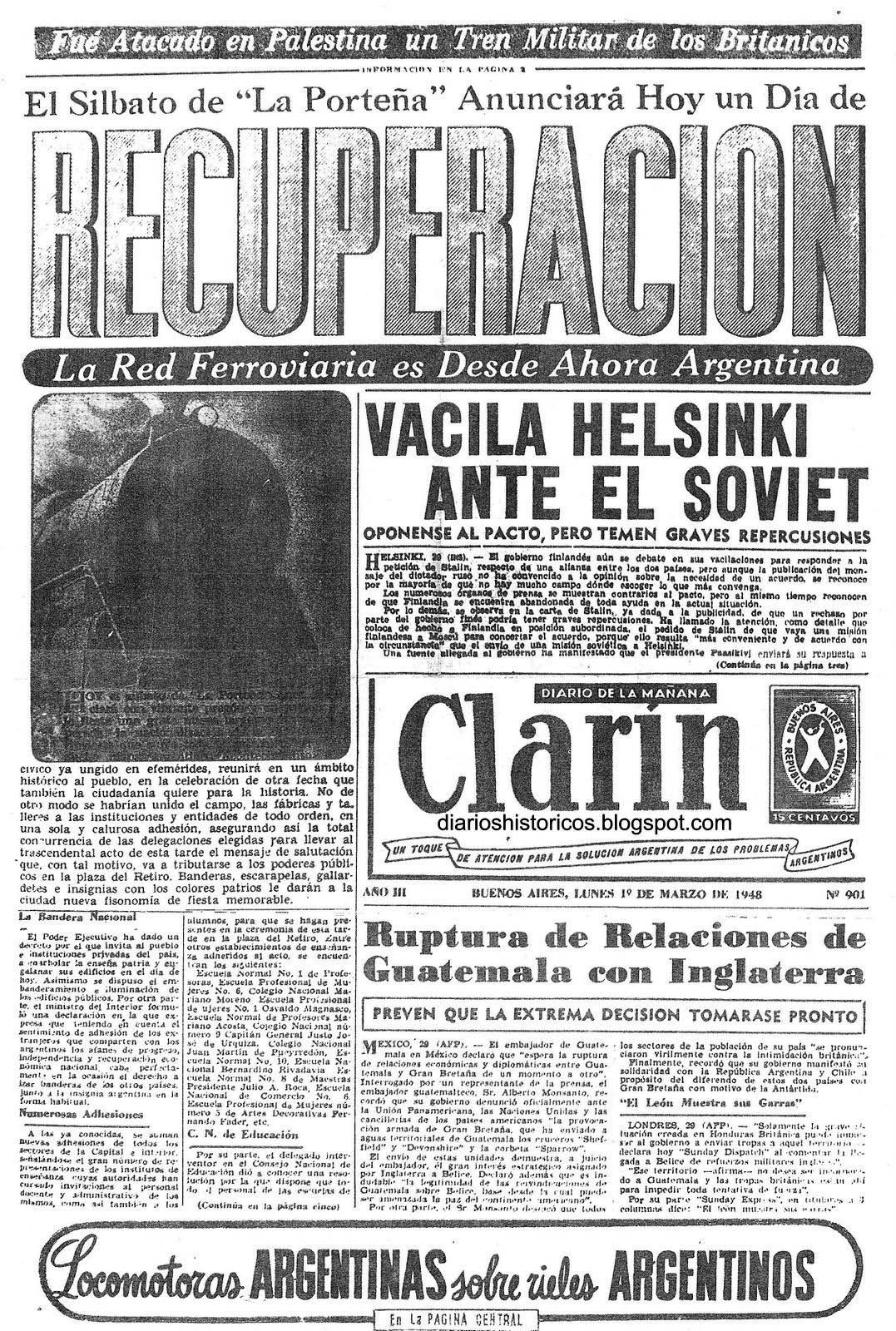
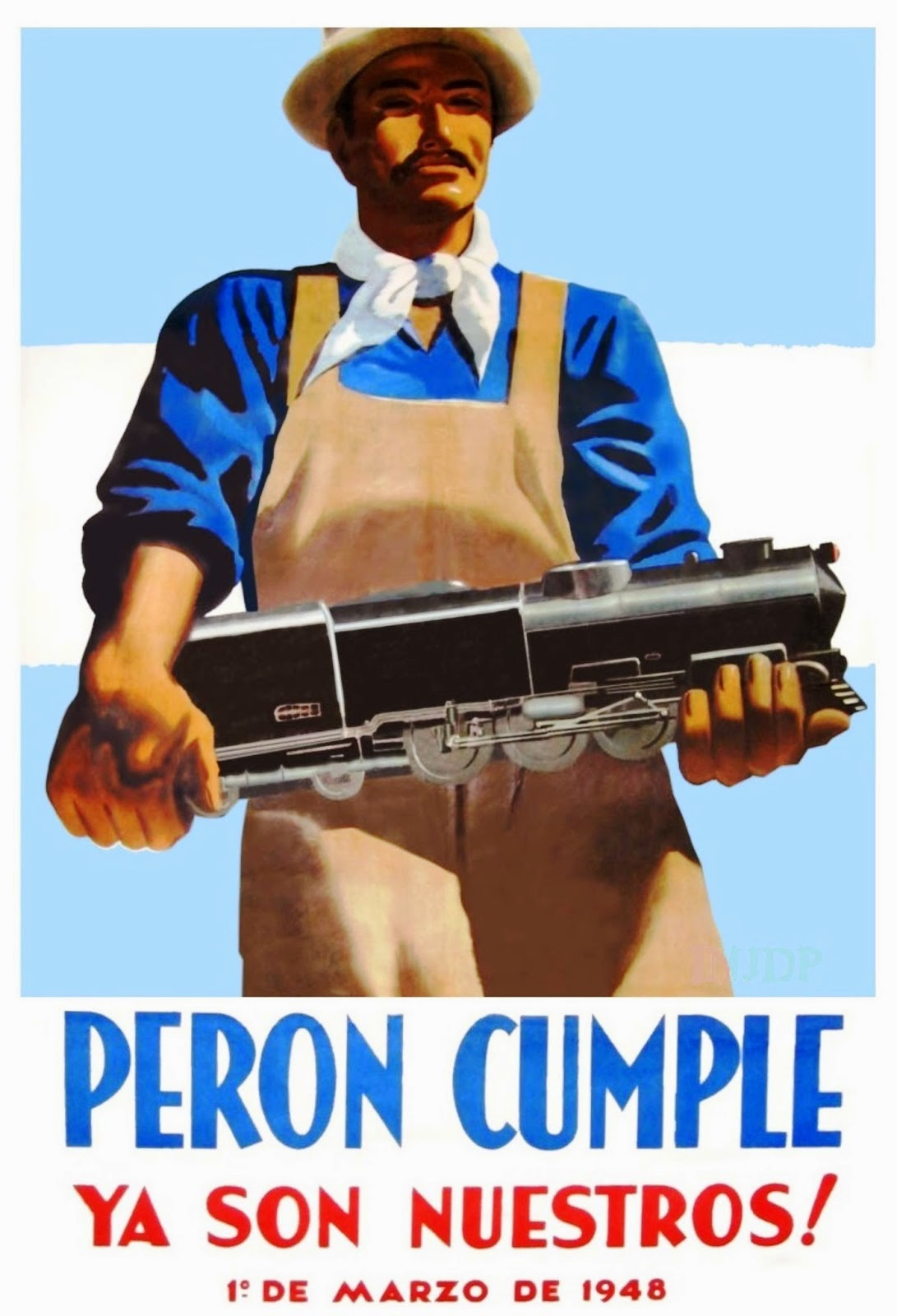
(Left): Cover of Clarín newspaper highlighting the nationalisation with the word "Recovering"; (right): Peronist propaganda bearing the caption "Perón Fulfils. They are now ours!"

Many Argentines regarded railway nationalisation as a major step towards the country's economic independence after a long period of foreign influence over its economy. The nationalisation of the railways, the central bank, the telephone system and the docks formed part of Perón's programme for the economic recovery of postwar Argentina and had been included in the first Five-Year Plan, announced in October 1946. At subsequent mass rallies, Perón described railway nationalisation as a victory over foreign imperialism.

There was little domestic opposition at the time. It later became apparent, however, that the nationalisation of the railways and other foreign-owned companies, rather than stimulating the national economy, contributed to the economic difficulties experienced by Argentina from the 1950s onwards. The nationalised enterprises added substantially to government budget deficits, which the Central Bank was forced to finance largely through "printing money", contributing to inflation. Argentine Railways, in particular, became the most heavily loss-making state-owned enterprise among the numerous companies nationalised by Perón, generating daily losses of one million US dollars by the 1960s, and two million by the 1980s.

== Bibliography ==
- British Steam on the Pampas by D.S. Purdom - Mechanical Engineering Publications Ltd, London (1977)
- British-Owned Railways in Argentina – Their Effect on Economic Nationalism, 1854-1948 by Winthrop R. Wright - Latin American Monograph No. 34, Institute of Latin American Studies, Univ. of Texas Press, London (1974)
