= Bahía Blanca and North Western Railway =

British-owned railway company in Argentina (1891–1904)

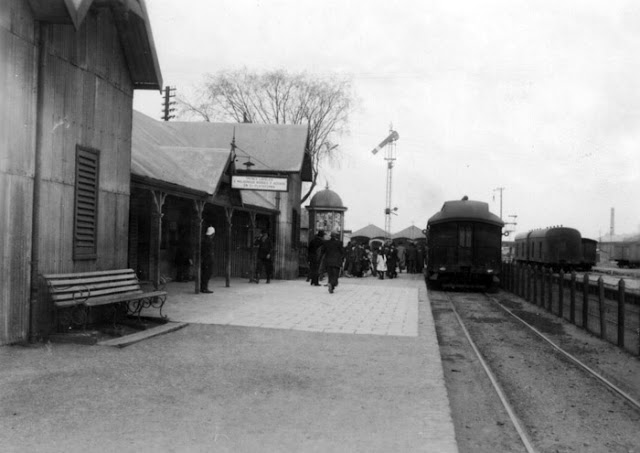
- Terminus Bahía Blanca station in 1930

Overview
- Native name: Ferrocarril de Bahía Blanca al Noroeste
- Status: Defunct company; rail lines active
- Owner: Government of Argentina
- Locale: Buenos Aires, La Pampa
- Termini: Bahía Blanca; Toay

Service
- System: Inter-city
- Services: 1

History
- Opened: 1891
- Closed: 1904 (acquired by the BA & Pacific, which sold it to BA Great Southern in 1924)

Technical
- Track gauge: 1,676 mm (5 ft 6 in)
Map of the line in 1904
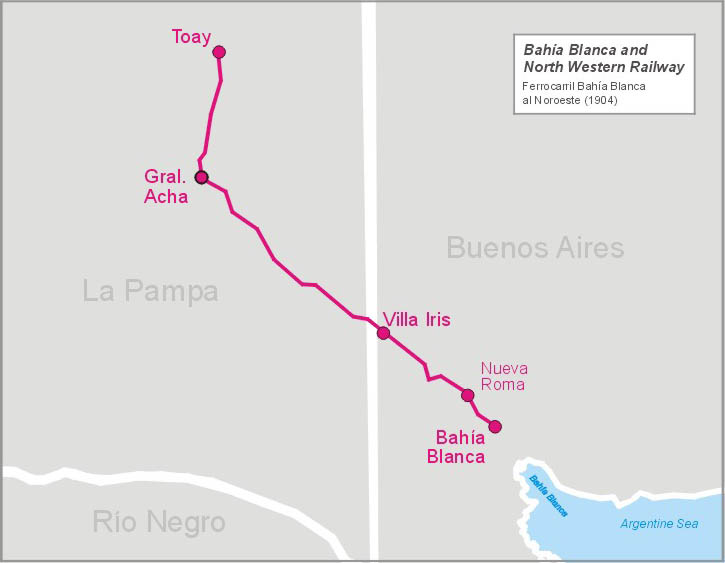

The Bahía Blanca and North Western Railway (Spanish: Ferrocarril Bahía Blanca al Noroeste) was a British-owned railway company that operated in Argentina. The original project was the rail line to run through the provinces of Buenos Aires, Córdoba and San Luis, tracks were only extended to Toay in La Pampa and Huinca Renancó in Córdoba. The BB&NWR was also the first railway line to reach La Pampa.

== History ==
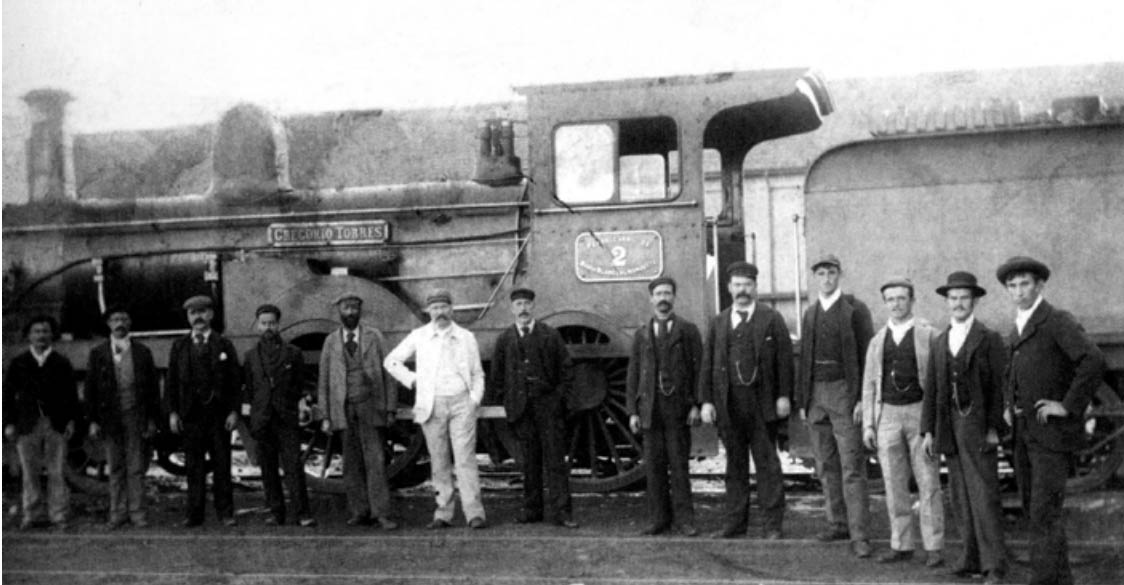
Workers of the BB&NWR

Portuguese trader Luis D'Abreu had made successive arrangements to build a railway. After many of his requests were repeatedly rejected by the Engineers Office of Argentina (then directed by Guillermo White), finally the Government granted D'Abreu's company, "Abreu, Torres y Cía", a concession to build and operate a railway by Law N° 2097 on September 29, 1887. Once the concession was given, Abreu transferred it to British company John Meiggs & Co., which finally transferred the permission to "Bahía Blanca & North Western Railway Corporation".

The company was registered in May 1889 and assumed concessions for lines from the port of Bahía Blanca in the south of Buenos Aires Province to Río Cuarto in the joint with Andean Railway and Villa Mercedes in the joint with BA & Pacific, via cities of General Acha, La Verde, Toay and Victorica, all of them in La Pampa Province. The plan was for this route to form the basis of a regional broad gauge, 5 ft 6 in (1,676 mm), network complete with branch lines eastwards towards the radial trunk routes spreading out from the federal capital, and feeder lines westwards.

Architects Alejandro Christophersen and Carl August Kihlberg were hired by the Hume Brothers (that worked as contractors for several railway companies including the BB&NWR) to design the Bahía Blanca terminus station, which was opened in 1891. On 29 January 1891, then president of Argentina Carlos Pellegrini promulgated a decree that allowed the company to build the Bahía Blanca-Bernasconi section. The BB&NWR was the first railway to reach La Pampa. That same year, construction of the Bernasconi-Hucal section was also officialized. The railway finally reached Toay in 1897.

The Nueva Roma-Puán line was allowed to build in 1904 by Law N° 4300. On June 23, president Julio Roca allowed Buenos Aires and Pacific Railway to rent BB&NWR. Therefore, lines to Villa Mercedes and Río Cuarto would be later completed by the BA & Pacific. That same year the National Congress promulgated Law N° 4481 that committed BB&NWR to build new branches to Nueva Roma and Catriló.

In 1904 the BB&NWR was acquired by the BA & Pacific. After the acquisition, the railway extended its tracks to Huinca Renancó in Córdoba (1908), joining BA Western R. tracks there. Finally in 1924, the BA&PR sold the BB&NWR to the BA Great Southern.

== Aftermath ==
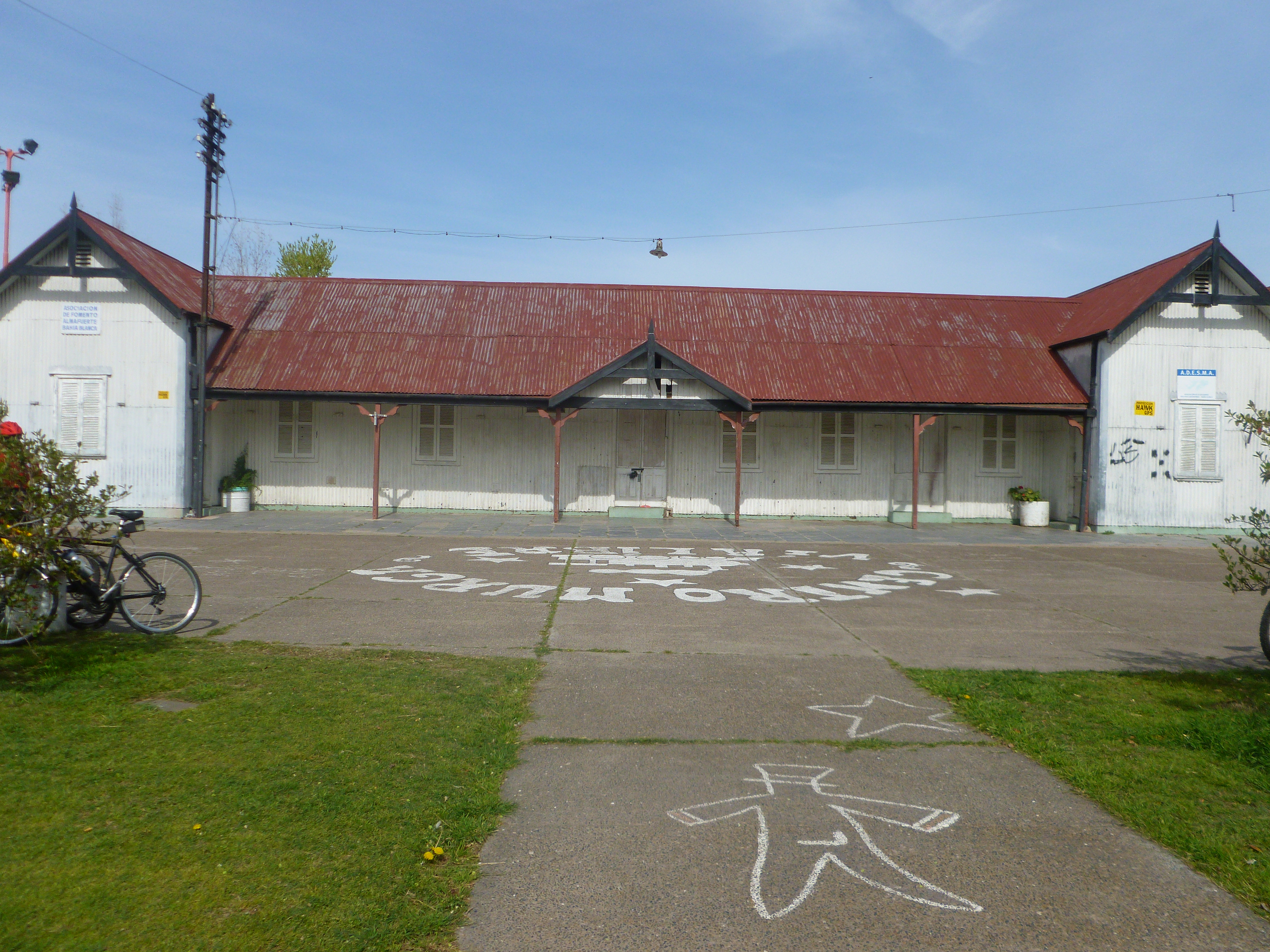
The well preserved Bahía Blanca station (terminus) as seen in 2012. It was destroyed by fire in 2022

The well preserved Bahía Blanca (named "Noroeste") station building was destroyed by fire in April 2022. The experts determined it was caused by short-circuit voltage. The building, which at the moment of the accident was seat of the municipal library and also used by local murgas, was demolished.

== Bibliography ==
- British Steam on the Pampas by D.S. Purdom - Mechanical Engineering Publications Ltd (London, 1977)
- British Railways in Argentina: 1857-1914 - A Case Study of Foreign Investment by Colin M. Lewis - Athlone Press (for the Institute of Latin American Studies, University of London, 1983)
