= General San Martín Railway =

Former railway company in Argentina

San Martín Railway
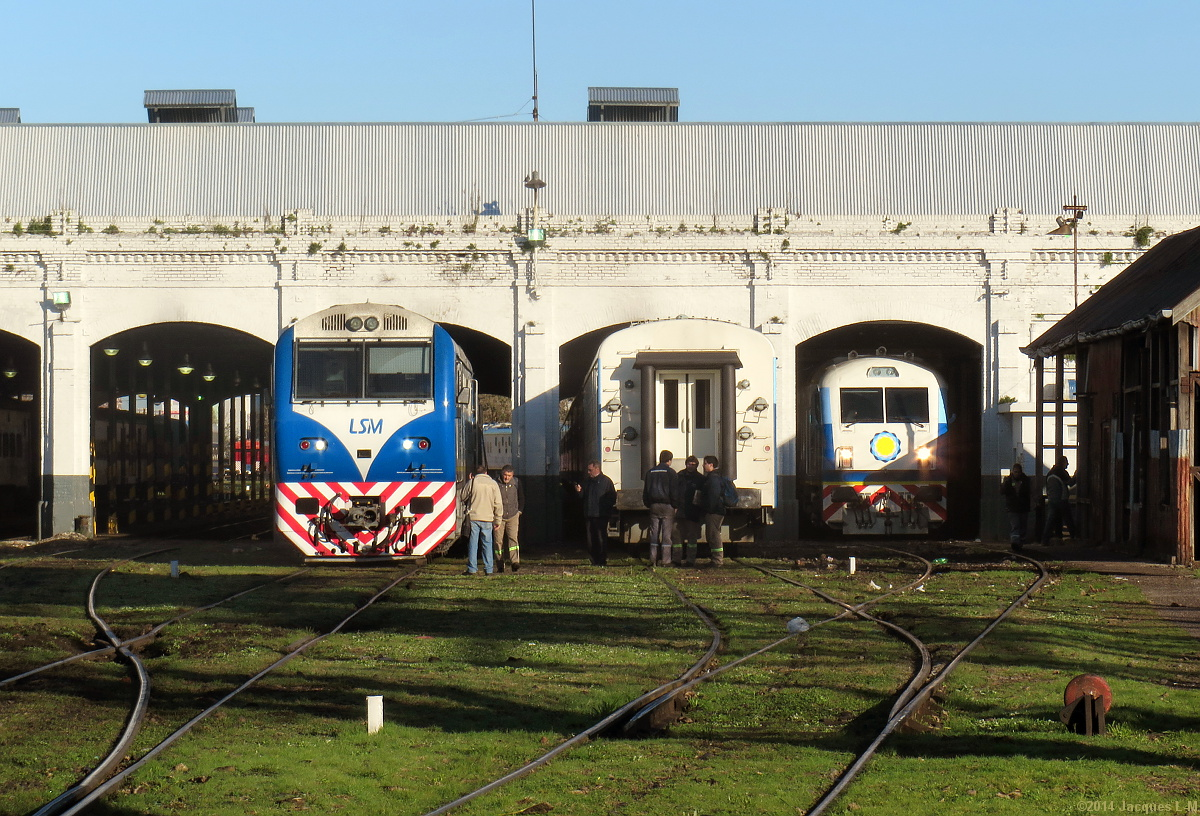
- Current rolling stock at a workshop in Haedo, Buenos Aires Province.

Overview
- Native name: Ferrocarril San Martín
- Status: Active
- Owner: Government of Argentina
- Locale: Buenos Aires, Santa Fe, Córdoba, San Juan, San Luis, Mendoza
- Termini: Retiro; Mendoza

Service
- Type: Inter-city
- Operator(s): Trenes Argentinos (passengers); Trenes Argentinos Cargas y Logística (freight)

History
- Opened: 1948; 78 years ago

Technical
- Track gauge: 1,676 mm (5 ft 6 in)
Route map
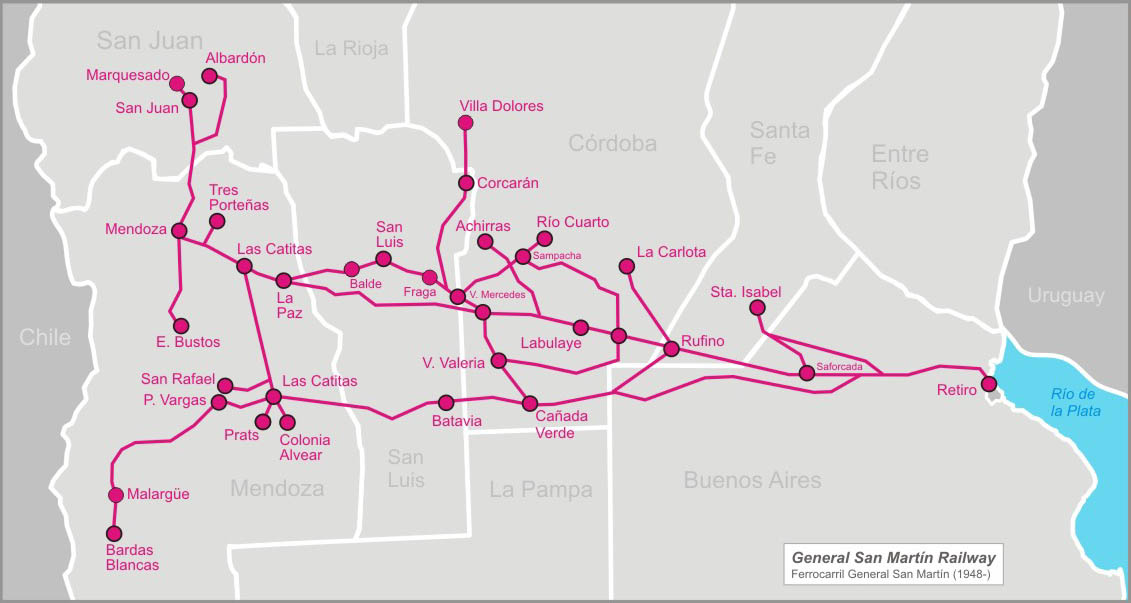

The General San Martín Railway (FCGSM) (Spanish: Ferrocarril General San Martín), named after the former Argentine general José de San Martín, was one of the six state-owned Argentine railway companies formed after President Juan Perón's nationalisation of the railway network in 1948. The six companies were managed by Ferrocarriles Argentinos which was later broken up during the process of railway privatisation beginning in 1991 during Carlos Menem's presidency.

The FCGSM took over the 1,676 mm (5 ft 6 in) broad gauge British-owned company Buenos Aires and Pacific Railway.

The principal lines departed from Retiro terminus in Buenos Aires to the west through the provinces of Buenos Aires, Santa Fe, Córdoba, Mendoza, San Luis and San Juan.

== History ==
=== Background ===
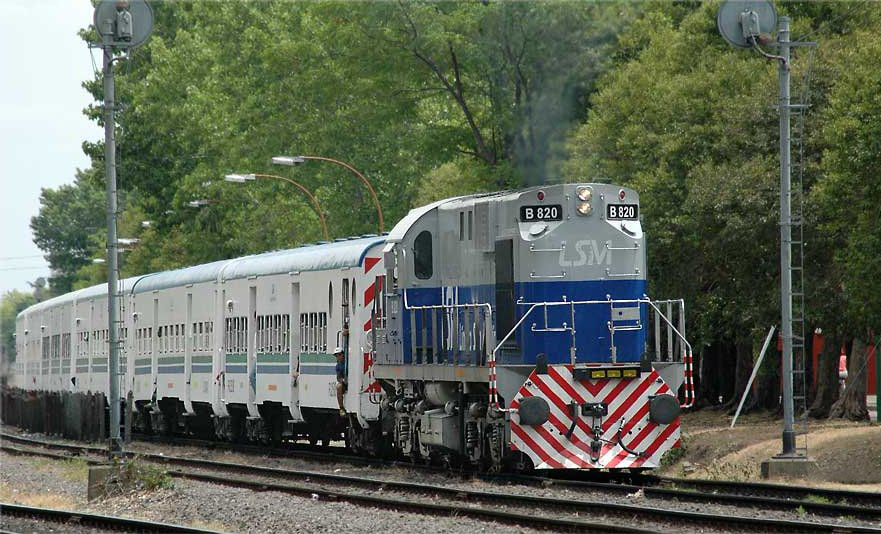
An urban service train, with the UGOFE symbols.

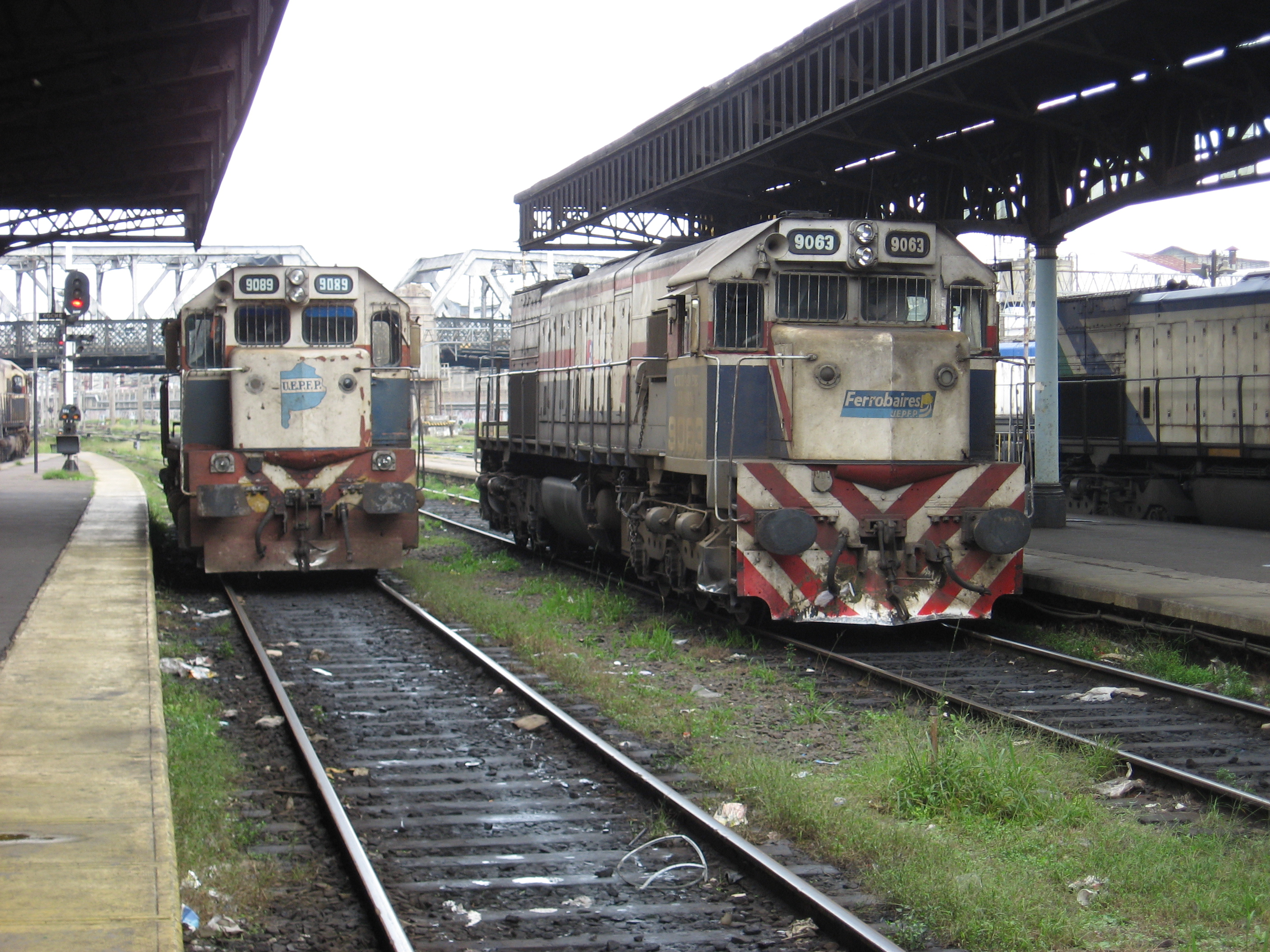
Two Ferrobaires locomotives, used for interurban services.

The Buenos Aires and Pacific Railway had been established in London on October 10, 1882, with the purpose to build a railway from Mercedes, Buenos Aires to Villa Mercedes in San Luis Province, where the line joined to Ferrocarril Andino. The entering to the city of Buenos Aires was made through Buenos Aires Western Railway (current Ferrocarril Sarmiento) until the company built its own access to the capital city of Argentina.

=== Nationalisation ===
After the World War II finished, British and French-owned railway companies in Argentina began proceedings with the purpose of selling their railways due to financial problems to operate those services. Finally on March 1, 1948, all the foreign railway companies in Argentina were nationalised under the Juan Perón's administration, creating the State-owned company "Empresa de Ferrocarriles del Estado Argentino (EFEA)", then renamed to Ferrocarriles Argentinos, taking over all the railway lines of Argentina, including passenger and freight services.

The following broad gauge railway companies were added to San Martín railway network after the 1948 nationalisation:

Ferrocarril San Martín
Former company	Provinces
BA & Pacific ^{(1)}	Buenos Aires, Santa Fe, Córdoba, Mendoza, San Luis
Andean	Córdoba, Mendoza, San Luis, San Juan

Notes:

- ^{(1)} The BAP had previously acquired the Villa María & Rufino (1900), Argentine Great Western Railway (1907), and Andean (1909) railways.

=== Ferrocarriles Argentinos ===
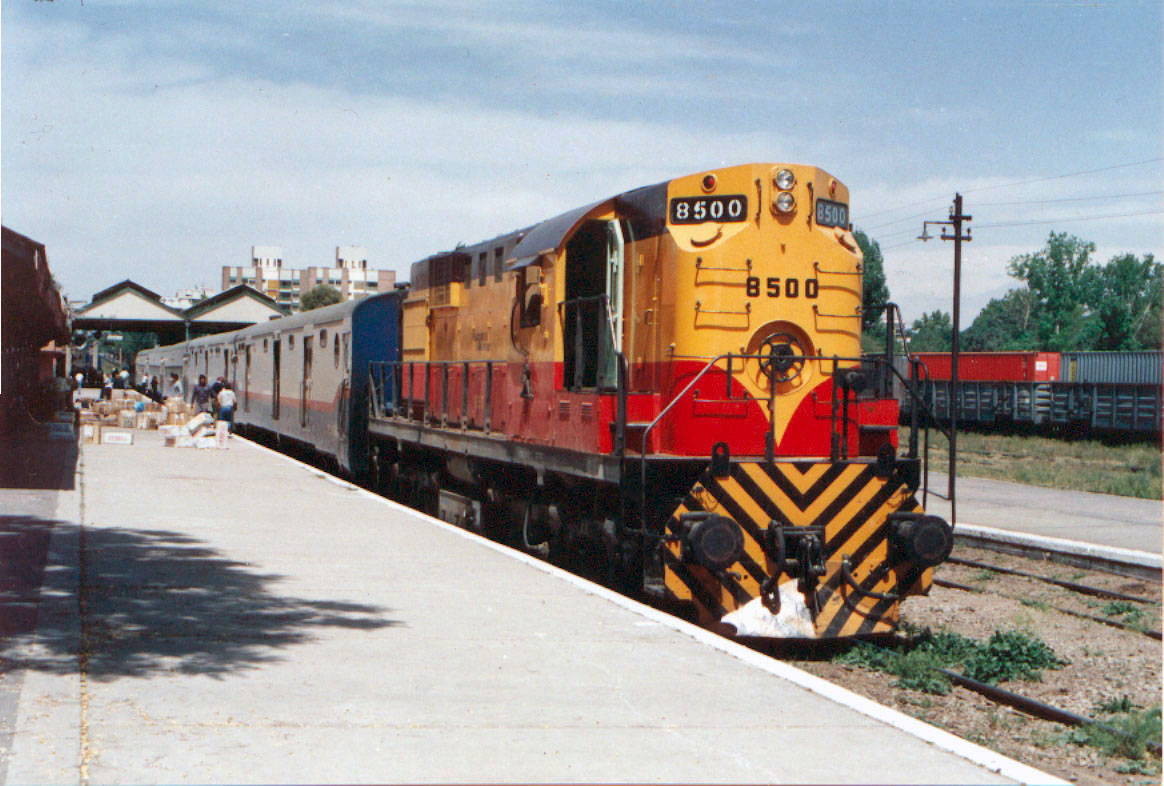
Ferrocarriles Argentinos El Aconcagua train in Mendoza, pre-1993.

By 1945 the English and French railway companies made the arrangements with the Government of Argentina to sell their railways. On November 1, 1947 the French companies became State-owned companies. Finally, on March 1, 1948, the Government took over the British railways, including the BAPR. That same year the railway was named "Ferrocarril Nacional General San Martín", honoring General José de San Martín, the prime leader of South American wars of independence.

By the beginning of the 1990s, the railway system in Argentina was showing a deficit of US$ 355 million per year (about 1 million a day). National Decree N° 520 (1991) created FEMESA, a State-owned company in replacement of Ferrocarriles Argentinos to operate the urban services in Buenos Aires. FEMESA would take over the passenger services until they were privatized. Ferrocarriles Argentinos only continued operating freight services.

On 10 March 1993, the Government of Argentina closed all the services from Buenos Aires to the rest of the country. The San Martín freight service was given in concession to private company "Buenos Aires al Pacífico" (then América Latina Logística - abbreviated "ALL"). The system included more than 5,000 km length, 120 locomotives and 8,500 freight wagons. Most of the material carried was oil and minerals.

Between January 1994 and June 1995 the lines temporarily operated by FEMESA were privatized. The consortium "Metropolitano" took over the San Martín line (along with Roca and Belgrano Sur lines, renamed "TMS", "TMR" and "TMB" respectively).

After the National Government cancelled all the interurban passenger services, in 1993 the Government of Buenos Aires created the "Unidad Ejecutora del Programa Ferroviario Provincial (UEPFP)" that began to operate some trains from the main terminus in Buenos Aires Constitución, Retiro and Once to different cities within Buenos Aires Province. The San Martín line took over the service to Junín and Iriarte.

The trains run on tracks that were also used by the freight companies (such as América Latina Logística), a part of being in bad conditions with no maintenance. The UEPFP later changed its name to "Ferrobaires".

=== Urban services ===
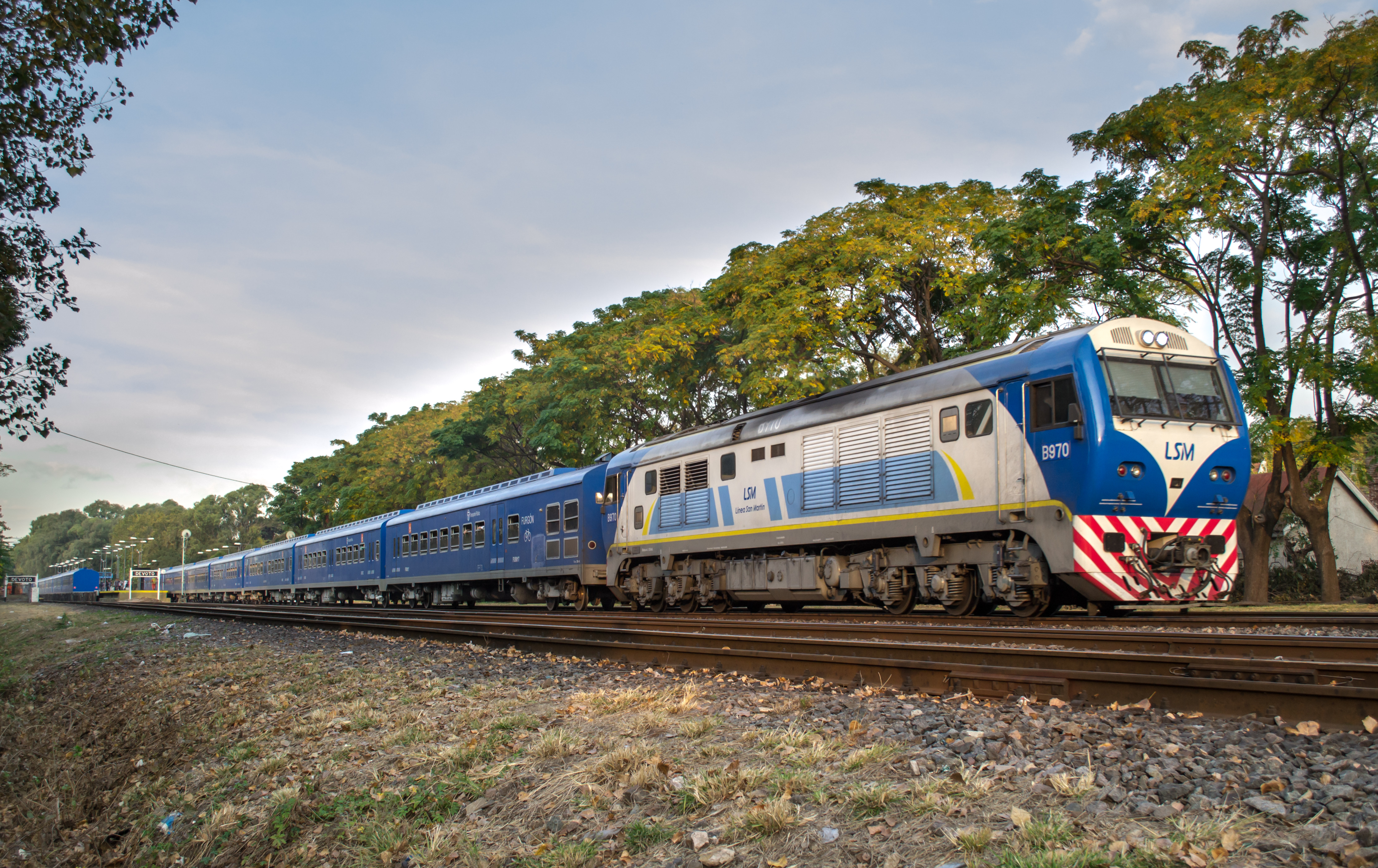
Chinese CSR SDD7 trains acquired for the San Martín line in 2013.

With the purpose of improving the passenger services in Greater Buenos Aires, Metropolitano acquired 15 locomotives by General Motors, although the devaluation of the Argentine Peso and the 2002 economic crisis made Metropolitano could not pay its debts and the rolling stock was retained in the customs due to a court order.

By 2003 the quality of the service got worse considerably due to the reasons given above. The critical condition of rolling stock and tracks led the Government to review the contract of concession. Two years later the users still criticize the poor conditions of the service so the Government decided to revoke the concession to Metropolitano for the San Martín urban services. As a result, a new consortium formed by the rest of private companies operating the urbain lines (Ferrovías, Metrovías and Trenes de Buenos Aires) named "UGOFE" took over the Retiro-Pilar branch. The 1,100 employees of the company were hired by Ferrocarril Belgrano S.A., a residual company created in 1999 when the Belgrano Cargas was privatized. After UGOFE took over the services, new locomotives and coaches were added to the trains. By March 2006 a new service Retiro-Hurlingham was launched.

In December 2012, the first locomotives and coaches by Chinese company CSR arrived to Argentina for the San Martín urban service.

In Mendoza, a new light rail service named the Metrotranvía Mendoza began operation in 2012, using a former right-of-way and trackbed of the FCGSM.

UGOFE operated the line until 12 February 2014, when the Minister of Transport, Florencio Randazzo, announced the San Martín line to be given in concession to "Corredores Ferroviarios S.A.", a company of Grupo Roggio.

== Train services ==
=== Metropolitan area ===
- Retiro – Dr. Cabred

=== Long distance ===
- Retiro – Junín
- Retiro – Palmira (Mendoza Province)
