= Transandine Railway =

Railway between Argentina and Chile (1910–84)

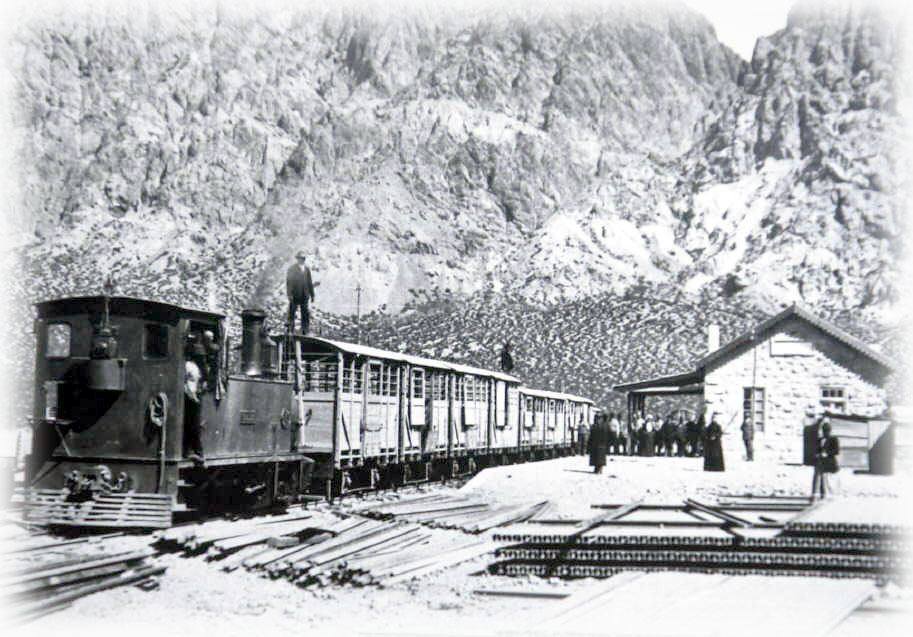
- Train at Uspallata station c. 1890s

Overview
- Other name: A16 Branch
- Native name: Ferrocarril Trasandino
- Status: Inactive
- Owner: Government of Argentina; Government of Chile
- Termini: Mendoza, Argentina; Los Andes, Chile
- Stations: 17

Service
- Type: Inter-city

History
- Opened: 1910 (Note: Date refers to the official inauguration of the entire line so the railway had been operating since 1891.)
- Closed: 1984; 42 years ago

Technical
- Line length: 248 km (154 mi)
- Number of tracks: Single track with passing loops
- Rack system: Abt
- Track gauge: 1,000 mm (3 ft 3 3/8 in) metre gauge
- Old gauge: `
- Minimum radius: 100 m (328.1 ft)
- Electrification: 3000 V DC Overhead line
- Highest elevation: 3,176 m (10,420 ft)
- Maximum incline: 8%
Route map
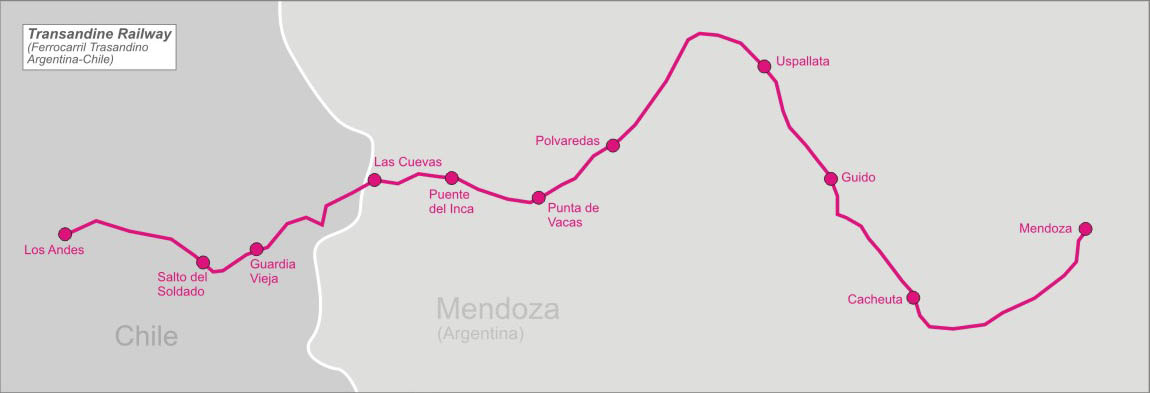

The Transandine Railway (Spanish: Ferrocarril Trasandino) was a 1,000 mm (3 ft 3 3/8 in) metre gauge combined rack (Abt system) and adhesion railway which operated from Mendoza in Argentina, across the Andes mountain range via the Uspallata Pass, to Santa Rosa de Los Andes in Chile, a distance of 248 km. It was a part of the first rail route linking the southern Pacific and Atlantic Oceans.

The railway has been out of service since 1984, and has been partly dismantled. There has been talk about restoring the railway, but there is currently no indication of any restorative work underway.

As of 2023, there are still freight train services between Los Andes and Río Blanco on the Chilean side running on the Transandine railway tracks.

== History ==
=== Beginning and development ===
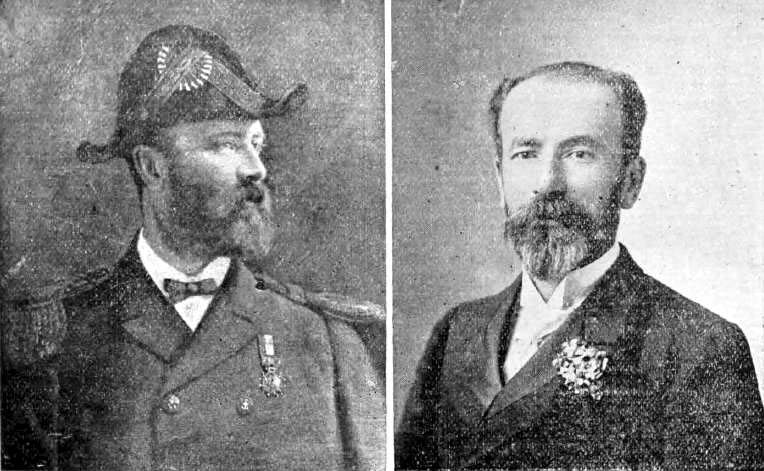
The Clark Brothers, whose company built the line

The Transandine Railway was first projected in 1854, but the construction of the line came many years later. It was initiated by Juan and Mateo Clark, Chilean brothers of British descent, successful entrepreneurs in Valparaíso who in 1871 built the first telegraph service across the Andes, between Mendoza in Argentina and Santiago in Chile.

In 1874 the Chilean government granted them the concession for the construction of the rail link. Because of financial problems, their company, Ferrocarril Trasandino Clark, did not begin work on the construction in Los Andes until 1887. The section between Mendoza and Uspallata was opened on 22 February 1891 and extended to Rio Blanco on 1 May 1892, to Punta de Vacas on 17 November 1893, to Las Cuevas on 22 April 1903.

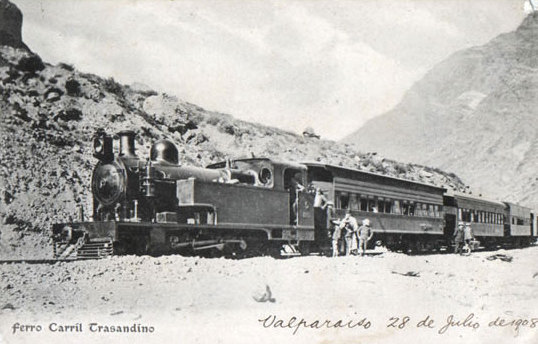
Train stopped at Valparaíso in 1908

On the Chilean side the section from 'Santa Rosa de Los Andes' to 'Hermanos Clark' was opened in 1906, and extended to Portillo in February 1908. The entire line was first opened to traffic in 1910. By then the company had been taken over by the British-owned Argentine Transandine Railway Company. The construction of the summit tunnel (total length 3463.5 yards) was carried out by the British-registered company "Messrs. C. H. Walker and Co. Limited". There was a discussion of the project at the Institution of Civil Engineers in London in December 1913.

The line followed roughly the ancient route taken by travellers and mule-trains crossing the Andes between Chile and Argentina and connected the broad gauge, 5 ft 6 in (1,676 mm), railway networks of the two countries, rising to a height of almost 3,200 metres at Las Cuevas where the track entered the Cumbre tunnel, about 3.2 km long, on the international border. Nine sections of rack were laid in the last 40 km of track on the Argentine approach to the tunnel, ranging from 1.2 km to 4.8 km in length, with a maximum gradient of 1 in 17 (5.88%). On the Chilean side there were seven sections of rack in just 24 km, of which one section was 16 km long with an average gradient of 1 in 13 (7.69%). Sections of the line were protected by snowsheds and tunnels.

The Chilean Transandine railway was originally worked by Kitson-Meyer 0-8-6-0s rack and adhesion locomotives, two examples of which survive in Chile. The line was electrified in 1927 with Swiss-built electric locomotives.

The railway suffered several disasters during its years of operation. A glacial flood in 1934 destroyed 124 km (77 mi) of the Argentine section, which was later rebuilt. An avalanche in 1936 in the Chilean section near Juncal killed three railway engineers, including the chief engineer of the line, Scotsman Peter Jardine.

When the entire Argentine railway network was nationalised in 1948, the Transandine Railway became part of the Belgrano Railway. The Mendoza-Paso de los Andes section was named "A12 branch" and the Paso de los Andes-Las Cuevas "A16".

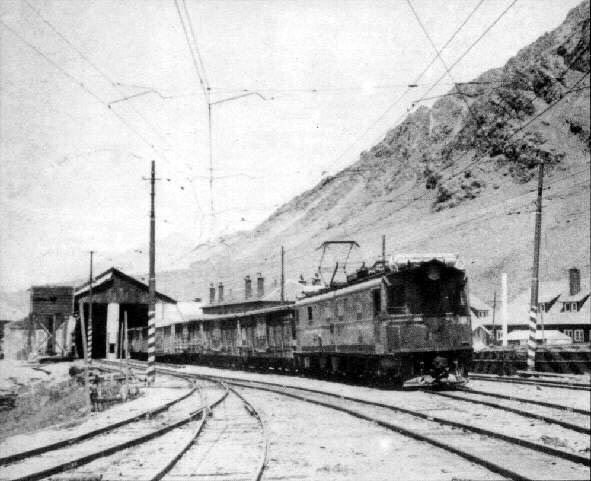
Freight train in Las Cuevas, 1973

The Transandean railway could transport only limited amounts of cargo. The original passenger wagons were made of lightweight construction to keep the dead weight to a minimum. Accidents due to derailing of the trains were not uncommon. Trains would get stuck in snowbanks and passengers would be stranded, sometimes for days. Due to the limitations on freight and passenger-carrying capacity, and later due to competition from motor vehicle transport, along with the dangers and relative discomfort as well as slow movement of the trains, the Transandine railway was never a commercial success.

During tensions between Chile and Argentina in 1977–78 due to the Beagle conflict, all international railway use of the Transandine Railway was suspended. Fearing an invasion from Argentina that could take advantage of the railway, the Chilean military prepared to destroy key sections of the Transandine. However, road traffic including buses, automobiles, and similar vehicles was conducted through the railway's "Cumbre" tunnel: since the railway tunnel was not wide enough for two-way vehicle transit, groups of vehicles were controlled and ran alternately from the Chilean and Argentine sides of the tunnel. With the relative normalization of relations between the two countries, railway passenger service through the tunnel resumed for a short period ending in 1979. The last freight train used the tunnel in 1984.

=== Projects ===
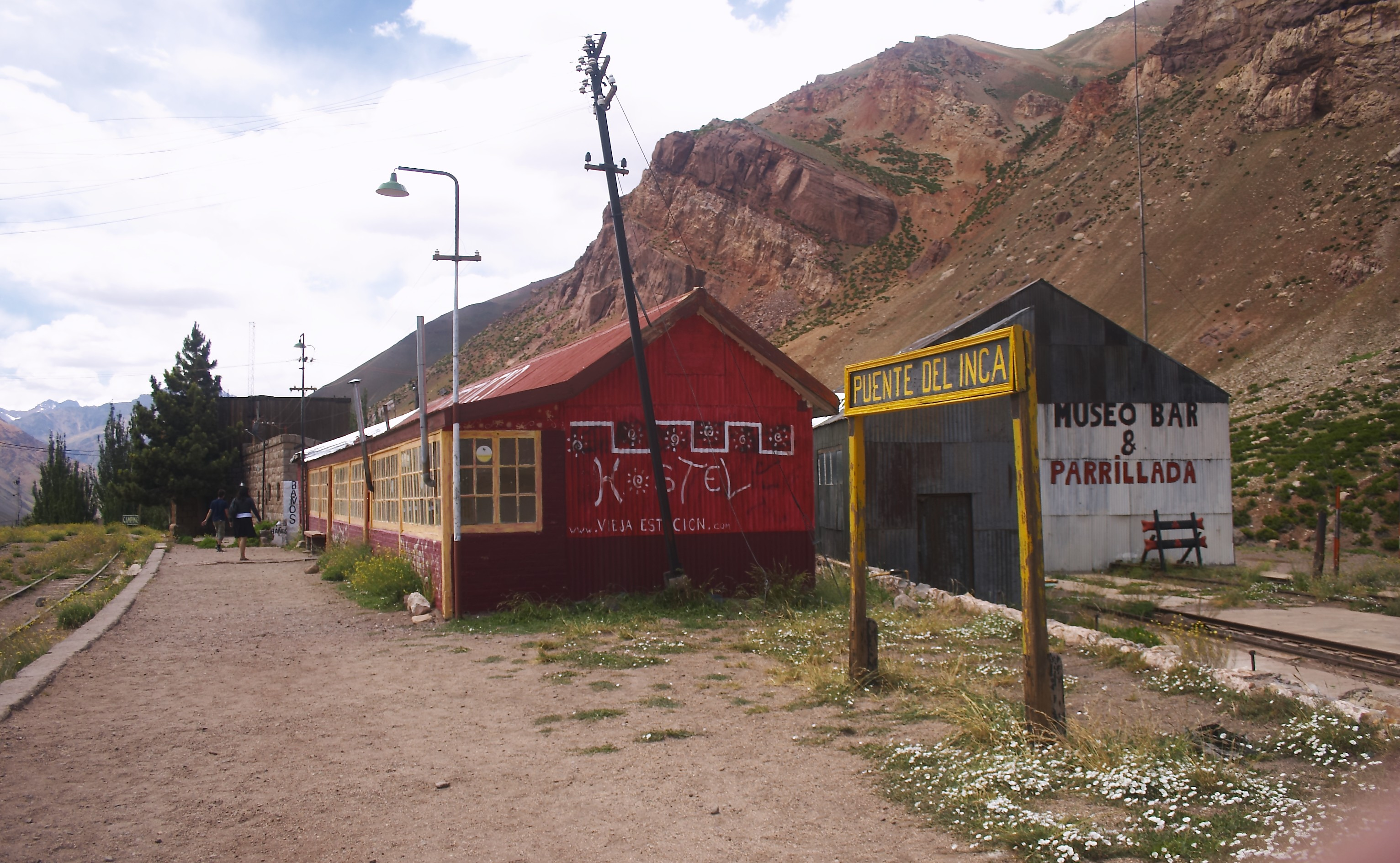
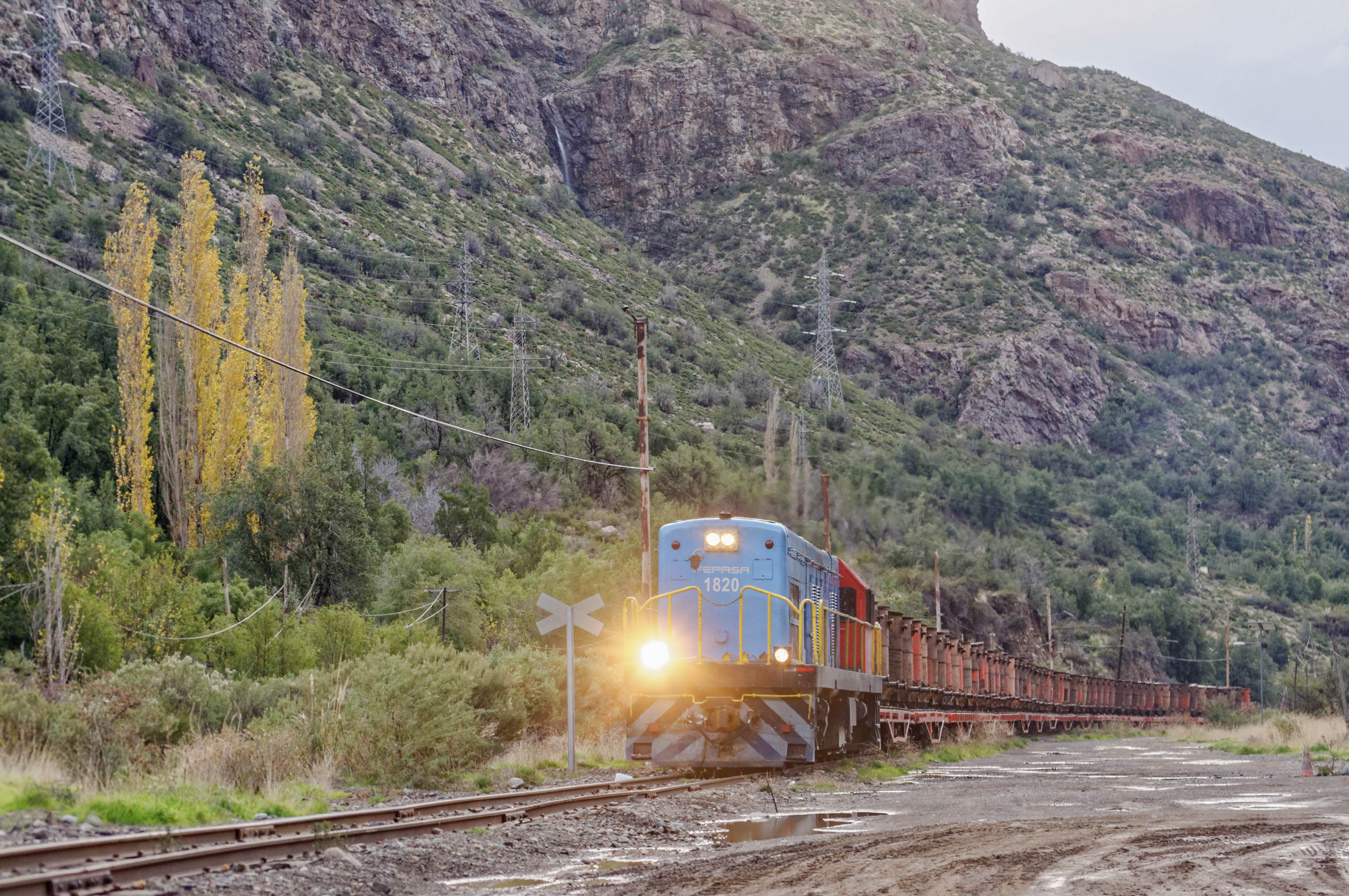
(Left): former Puente del Inca station as seen in 2007; (right): train running between Los Andes and Río Blanco in 2018. That route on the Chilean side is the only one that remains active

In 2006, both the Argentine and Chilean governments agreed to refurbish the railway and make it functional by the year 2010, at an estimated total cost of US$460 million.

In 2016 and after almost a decade of announcements and good intentions from both countries, the Transandine train that Argentina and Chile had been promoting since 2006 was finally postponed and without a recovery date. The Government of Chile decided that the private initiative project presented by the Eurnekián group among other holdings, was not among its priorities in the plan to improve border crossings. This statement was endorsed by the Argentine government then led by Mauricio Macri. The Trasandino was removed from the list of border union issues, focusing on announcements related to improvements for car traffic in the bi-oceanic corridor. The project included a 52-km line between Luján de Cuyo in Mendoza Province and the Chilean Andes. The train was expected to transport 72 million tons per year, with an initial cost of U$S3,000 million.

On the Chilean side, the section between the town of Los Andes and a point above the old station of Río Blanco continues to be used for transport of copper mining materials (acids, copper, copper concentrates). At Río Blanco there is a rail connection to the Codelco mine at Saladillo. Modern diesel-electric locomotives are used.

Another meeting between authorities from Argentina and Chile was held in Curicó in 2022. Both parties committed to build a new transandine railway that would start at the south of Mendoza, where mountain passes have lower heights. The new project planned to connect both countries at "Paso del Planchón" which is located 2,370 metres above sea level, less than other passes that connect Argentina and Chile such as Agua Negra, Las Leñas, or Los Libertadores. This alternative would help reduce the cost of construction of the line. Works have an estimated cost of US$1,000 million.

== Characteristics ==
=== Railway companies ===
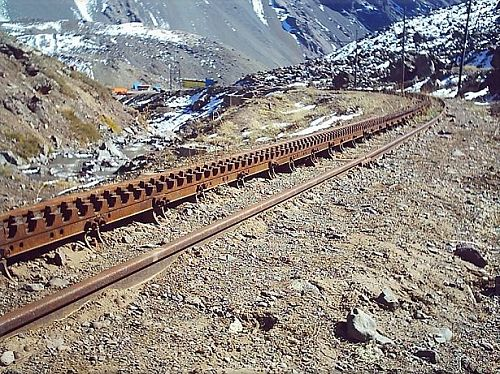
Abt rack system used in the line

The Transandine completed a 1,408 km (875 mi) rail link between the Argentine capital of Buenos Aires and the Chilean port of Valparaiso, and provided the first rail route linking the southern Pacific and Atlantic Oceans. This journey involved the use of services operated by the following five railway companies:

- Buenos Aires and Pacific Railway: Buenos Aires (Retiro terminus) to Villa Mercedes (1,676 mm or 5 ft 6 in gauge, 689 km or 428 mi).
- Argentine Great Western Railway: Villa Mercedes to Mendoza (1,676 mm gauge, 354 km or 220 mi).
- Argentine Transandine Railway: Mendoza to the international border Las Cuevas (1,000 mm or 3 ft 3 3/8 in gauge, 159 km or 99 mi).
- Chilean Transandine: International border (Las Cuevas, Arg) to Santa Rosa de Los Andes (1,000 mm gauge, 73 km or 45 mi).
- Chilean State Railway: Santa Rosa de Los Andes to Valparaíso (1,676 mm gauge, 134 km or 83 mi).

Passenger service between Buenos Aires and Valparaiso took about 36 hours, including changes of train in Mendoza and Los Andes, required because of the break-of-gauge at these points. In comparison, the 5,630 km (3,500 mi) journey by sea between the same two points, around Cape Horn, took eleven days.

== See also ==
- List of road-rail bridges
- Trans-Andean railways

== Bibliography ==
- H. R. Stones, British Railways in Argentina 1860–1948, P.E. Waters & Associates, Bromley, Kent, England (1993).
- W. S. Barclay, The First Transandine Railway, Geographical Journal, Vol. 36, No. 5, 553–562 (1910).
- H. R. Stones, International Rail Routes Over the Andes, Railway Magazine, Vol. 105, No. 699, July 1959, pp. 460–466.
- Santiago Marín Vicuña, Los hermanos Clark, Balcells & Co., Santiago de Chile (1929), 76–260.
- Cole, Beverly (2011). Trains. Potsdam, Germany: H.F.Ullmann. ISBN 978-3-8480-0516-1.
