= 0-8-0+0-6-0T =

Articulated locomotive wheel arrangement

An 0-8-0+0-6-0, in the Whyte notation for the classification of steam locomotives by wheel arrangement, is the configuration for any such articulated locomotives with two separate pivoting engine units. The front engine unit has no leading truck, and eight driving wheels. The rear engine unit has six driving wheels and no trailing truck. Any such locomotives built as tank locomotives are referred to as an 0-8-0+0-6-0T.

In the UIC system, this would be described as a D'C't arrangement. The suffix "t" denotes this locomotive being a tank locomotive. A locomotive that carries its fuel and water on board via tanks for the water and a bunker at the rear of the cab for fuel.

== Examples ==
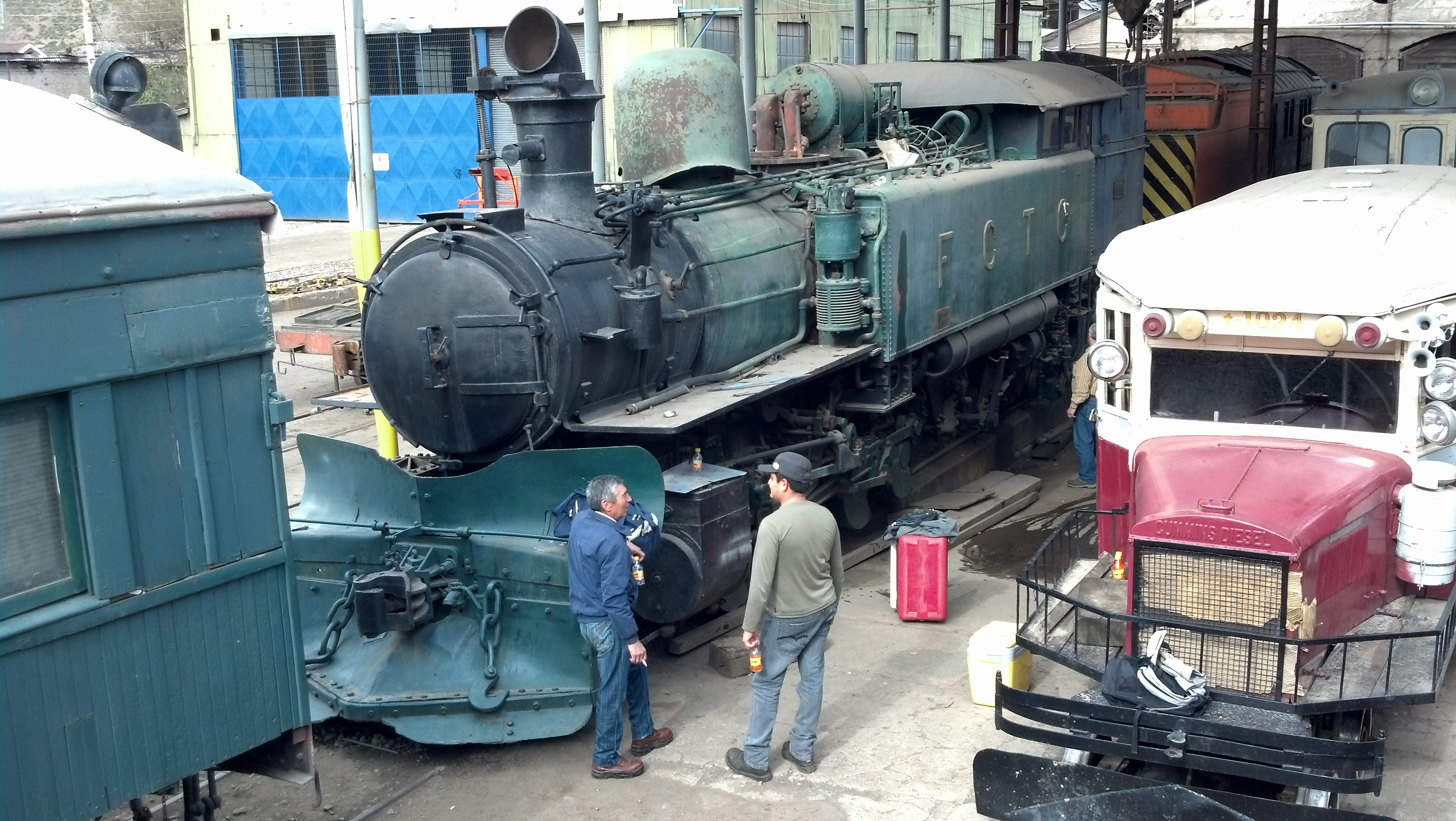
Kitson-Meyer 3348, under restoration in 2013

Six locomotives with this wheel arrangement were built by Kitson & Co. as Kitson Meyers for the Transandine Railway, three of which survive today.
