= Villa María and Rufino Railway =

British railway company in Argentina

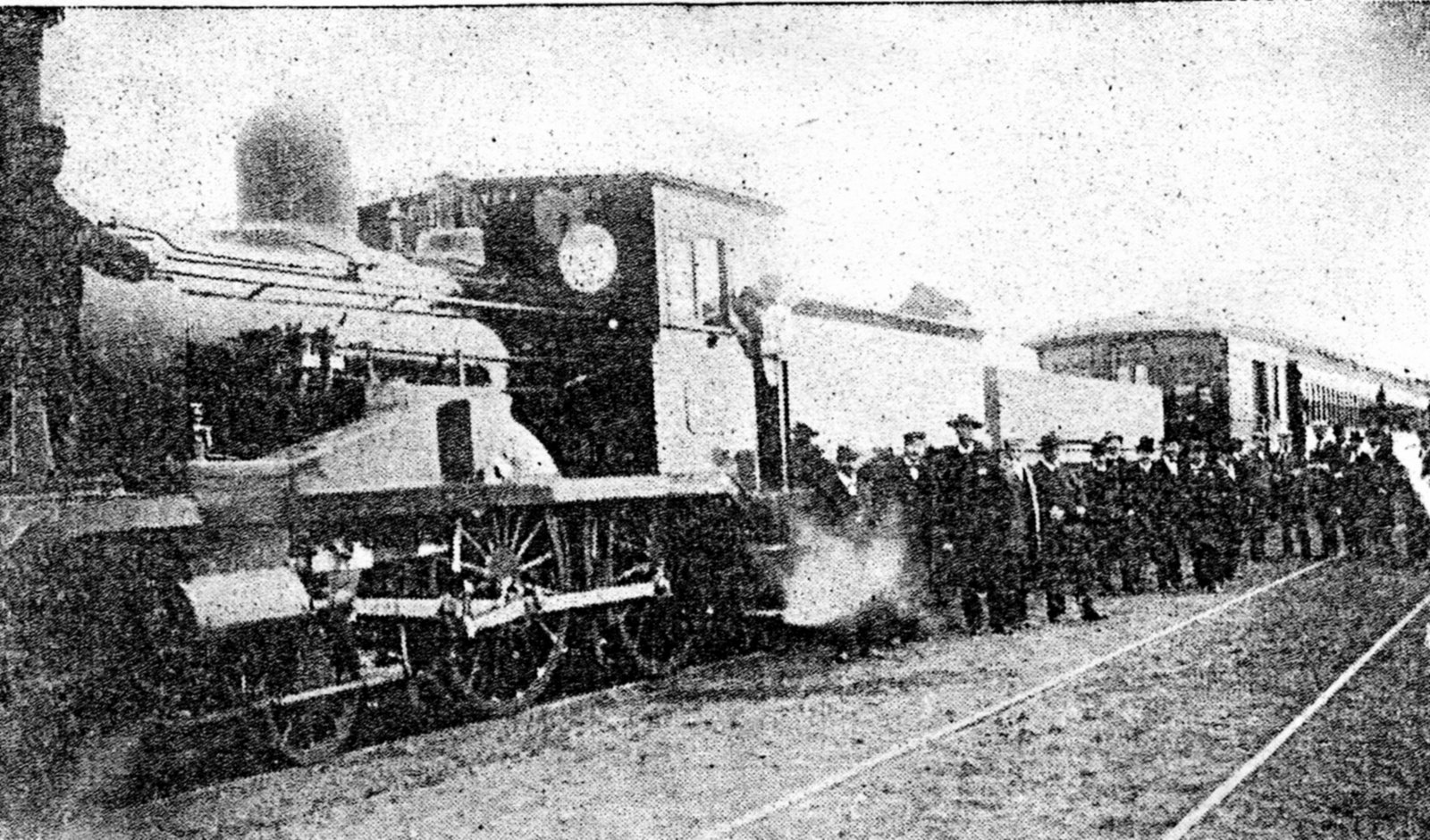
- Rufino station and train in June 1900.

Overview
- Native name: Ferrocarril Villa María a Rufino
- Status: Defunct company; some lines active
- Locale: Córdoba, Santa Fe
- Termini: Villa María; Rufino

Service
- Type: Inter-city

History
- Opened: 1890
- Closed: 1900; 126 years ago (acquired by BA & Pacific)

Technical
- Line length: 227 km (141 mi)
- Track gauge: 1,676 mm (5 ft 6 in)
Route map
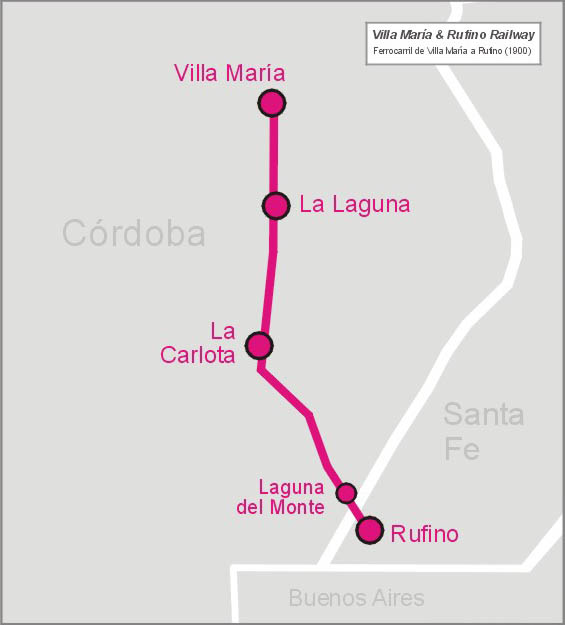

The Villa María and Rufino Railway (VM&RR) (native name: Ferrocarril Villa María a Rufino) was a British-owned company that, towards the end of the 19th century, built and operated a broad gauge, 5 ft 6 in (1,676 mm), railway line in Argentina.

== History ==
The VM&RR was granted a concession on 15 August 1887 to construct a 227 km line between Villa María in Córdoba Province, on the Central Argentine Railway (CAR), and Rufino in Santa Fe Province, on the Buenos Aires and Pacific Railway (BA&P). The section between Villa María and La Carlota was opened on 26 October 1890 and from La Carlota to Rufino on 23 March 1891.

The line passed through the developing grain zone, which lay between the main lines operated by the BA&P and the CAR, and became a valuable feeder for the former railway. At that time the VM&R provided farmers situated along its route with their only direct access to the port and market of Buenos Aires.

Because of their common interests the VM&RR and the BA&P forged close links until finally, in 1900, the BA&P took over the VM&R.

== See also ==
- Buenos Aires and Pacific Railway
- San Martín Railway

== Bibliography ==
- British Railways in Argentina 1857-1914: A Case Study of Foreign Investment by Colin M. Lewis - Athlone Press (for the Institute of Latin American Studies, University of London, 1983)
