= Argentine Great Western Railway =

British-owned railway company in Argentina

Overview
- Native name: Ferrocarril Gran Oeste Argentino
- Locale: Mendoza, San Luis, San Juan

History
- Opened: 1887
- Closed: 1907; 118 years ago (acquired by BA & Pacific)

Technical
- Track gauge: 1,676 mm (5 ft 6 in)

The Argentine Great Western Railway (AGWR) (in Spanish: Ferrocarril Gran Oeste Argentino) was a British-owned railway company, founded in 1887, that operated a broad gauge, 1,676 mm (5 ft 6 in), railway network in the Argentine provinces of San Luis, San Juan and Mendoza. In 1907 it was taken over on a lease by the Buenos Aires and Pacific Railway (BA&P).

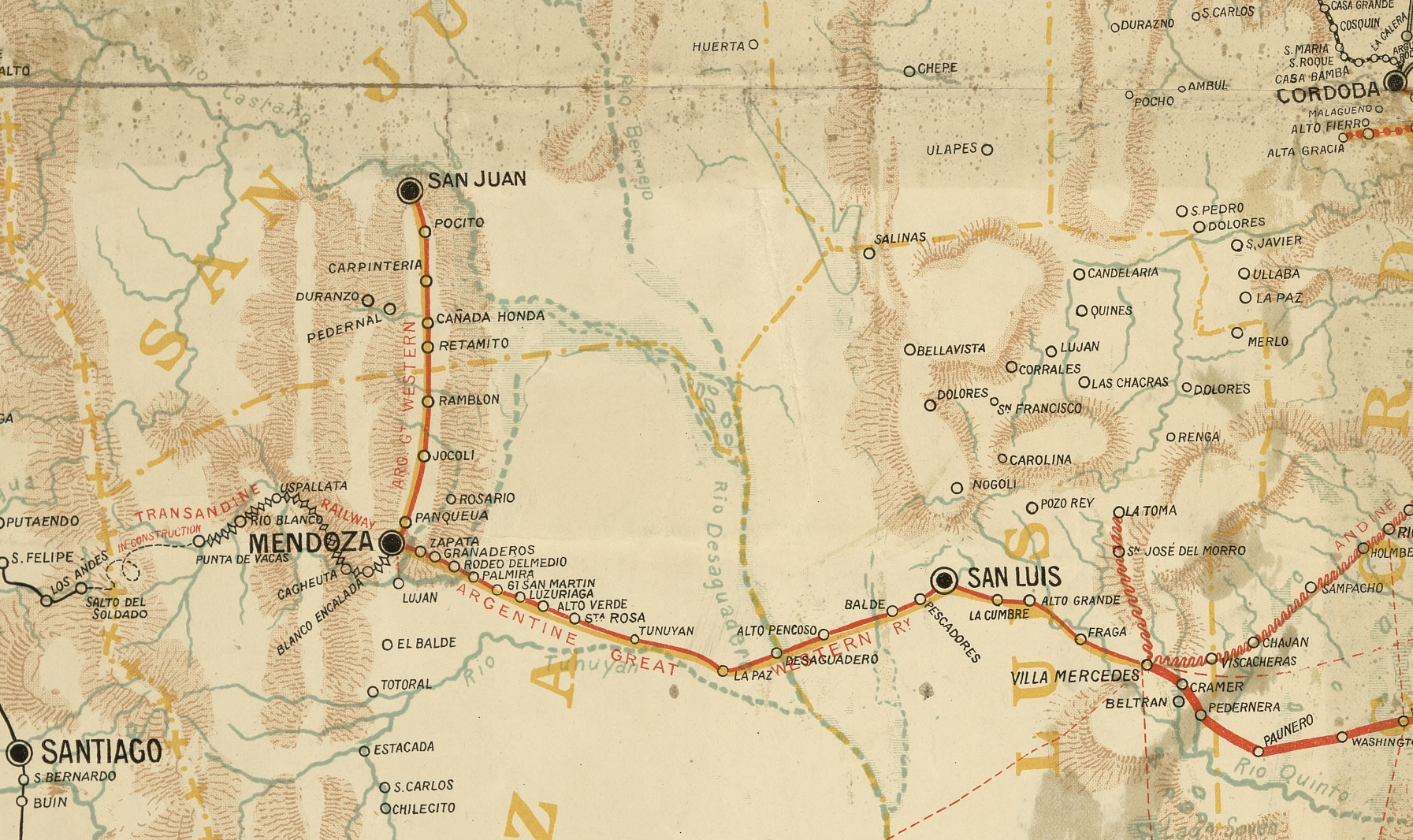
Argentine Great Western Railway map in 1899

The AGWR was founded in 1887, and in the same year bought the 518 km line connecting Villa Mercedes in San Luis Province with Mendoza and San Juan in the rich wine-producing districts at the foot of the Andes. This line had been built by the State-owned company Ferrocarril Andino between 1878 and 1885 as the middle section of a planned transcontinental route from Buenos Aires to the border with Chile.

Next the AGW embarked upon the building of branch lines and feeders in northern San Luis Province and southwards through Mendoza Province, transforming the network into a regional system geared to the needs of this wine-producing region. As a result, the company saw its traffic returns increase dramatically between 1895 and 1905, although there was always fierce competition from the BA&P.

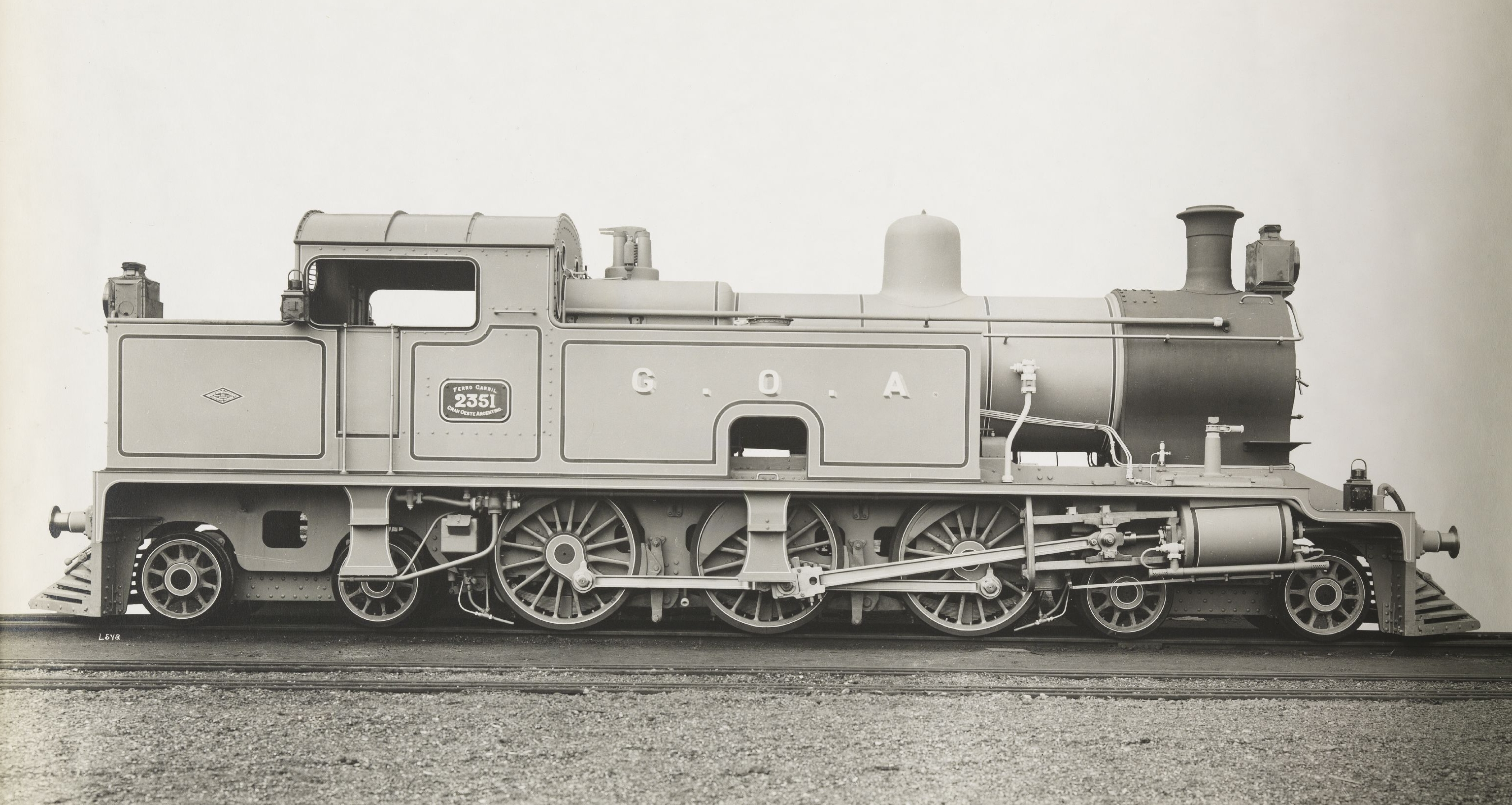
Steam engine of the Argentine Great Western Railway (AGWR)

In 1903 the AGW took over a lease on the working and management of the Transandine Railway which was under construction and in financial difficulties. In 1905 the AGW, together with the BA&P, agreed to guarantee the stock of the Transandine, thereby enabling them to raise additional funds. Two years later the AGW was taken over on a lease by the BA&P who at the same time took over the working of the Transandine.

== See also ==
- Buenos Aires and Pacific Railway
- San Martín Railway

== Bibliography ==
- Lewis, Colin M. (1983). British Railways in Argentina 1857-1914: A Case Study of Foreign Investment. Athlone Press (for the Institute of Latin American Studies, University of London).
- Stones, H.R. (1993). British Railways in Argentina 1860-1948. Bromley, Kent, England: P.E.Waters & Associates.
- Wright, Winthrop R. (1974). British-Owned Railways in Argentina – Their Effect on Economic Nationalism, 1854-1948. Latin American Monograph. Vol. 34. London: Institute of Latin American Studies, Univ. of Texas Press.
