= Buenos Aires and Pacific Railway =

British owned railway company in Argentina (1886–1948)

Overview
- Other name: Ferrocarril Buenos Aires al Pacífico
- Locale: Argentina
- Termini: Buenos Aires; Mendoza
- Stations: Santa Fe; Córdoba; San Luis

History
- Opened: 1882
- Closed: 1948; 78 years ago

Technical
- Track gauge: 1,676 mm (5 ft 6 in)

The Buenos Aires and Pacific Railway (BA&P) (in Spanish: Ferrocarril Buenos Aires al Pacífico) was one of the Big Four broad gauge, 1,676 mm (5 ft 6 in), British-owned companies that built and operated railway networks in Argentina.

The original concession was awarded by the Argentine government in 1872 to John E. Clark for the construction of a railway from Buenos Aires to Chile. It was not until 1882, when the BA&P was registered as a joint-stock company in London, that Clark was able to take over the concession. Initially the new company only intended to build the section between Mercedes, in Buenos Aires Province, and Villa Mercedes in San Luis Province. From Mercedes the company planned to obtain access to the city of Buenos Aires over the Ferrocarril Oeste track. At Villa Mercedes it connected with the Ferrocarril Andino line that ran on to Mendoza and San Juan.

== History ==
=== Opening ===
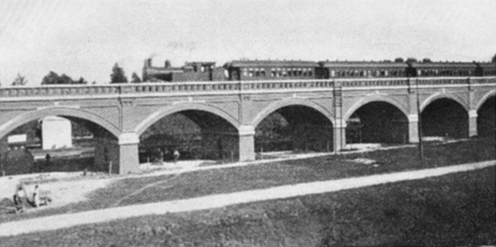
A train crossing the arc bridges in Palermo, Buenos Aires, 1909

Chilean citizen Juan E. Clark obtained in 1872 a concession for the construction of a railway line from Buenos Aires to Chile. In 1882 the "Buenos Aires and Pacific Railway" (BA&P) company was registered in London, and Clark was able to begin construction of the line. Initially this new company was going to build the section between Mercedes, in the Province of Buenos Aires, and Villa Mercedes in the Province of San Luis. Trains were going to reach Buenos Aires from Mercedes using the tracks of the Western Railway, then connecting with the Andean Railway whose rails reached Mendoza and San Juan.

Work began on the line to Villa Mercedes in July 1882 and the line was opened on 8 October 1886. After a change of plan, the company applied for, and was granted, permission to build its own independent access to Buenos Aires. Therefore, in 1888 the BAPR opened the 100-km length Mercedes−Palermo. It was a long-distance service with only two stops existing, Caseros and Muñiz. In Buenos Aires, Retiro was an intermediate stop before reaching Central Station terminus through Buenos Aires Northern Railway rail tracks.

As Buenos Aires population increased, new stations were opening and frequencies were also increased. Some of those stations were La Paternal (which original name was "Chacarita") in 1887, Villa Devoto in 1888, Bella Vista in 1891 and San Miguel in 1896, Santos Lugares in 1906, Villa del Parque and Sáenz Peña one year later and El Palomar in 1908.

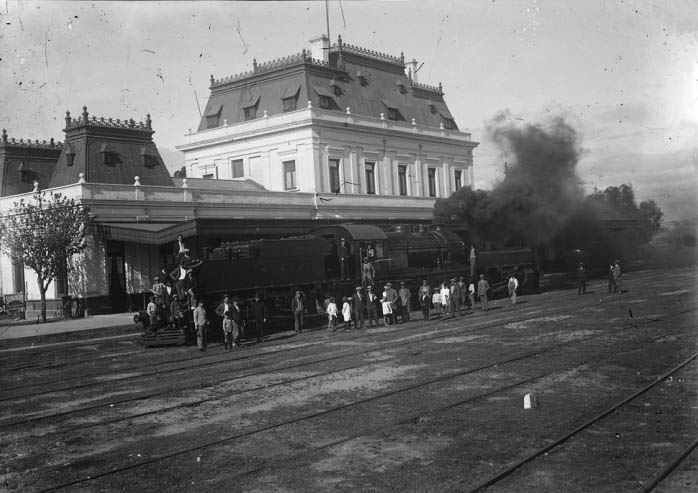
San Luis station, c. 1930

The Sánez Peña-Villa Luro line was opened in 1909, that same year Palermo station began to be built. Three years later the line reached Retiro, that was a provisional station so the BAPR had planned to build a terminus in front of Correo Central. Nevertheless, the project was never carried out and the lands were sold in 1931 to build Luna Park.

In 1938 the Sánez Peña-Villa Luro section was closed because of the construction of Avenida General Paz. The Municipality of Buenos Aires had stated that there could be no level crossings in the freeway which obligated BAPR to build a bridge over it. The line had been thought for freight services mainly, carrying merchandise to Riachuelo. However the creation of Port of Buenos Aires made cargo traffic decrease in the South of the city. The BAPR decided to close the line, leaving the Villa Real district without services and virtually isolated from public transport.

When it was first completed, the new line provided the provinces of the Cuyo with a direct rail link to the federal capital, instead of the much longer route, via Villa María to Rosario and then by river steamer to Buenos Aires.

=== Takeovers ===
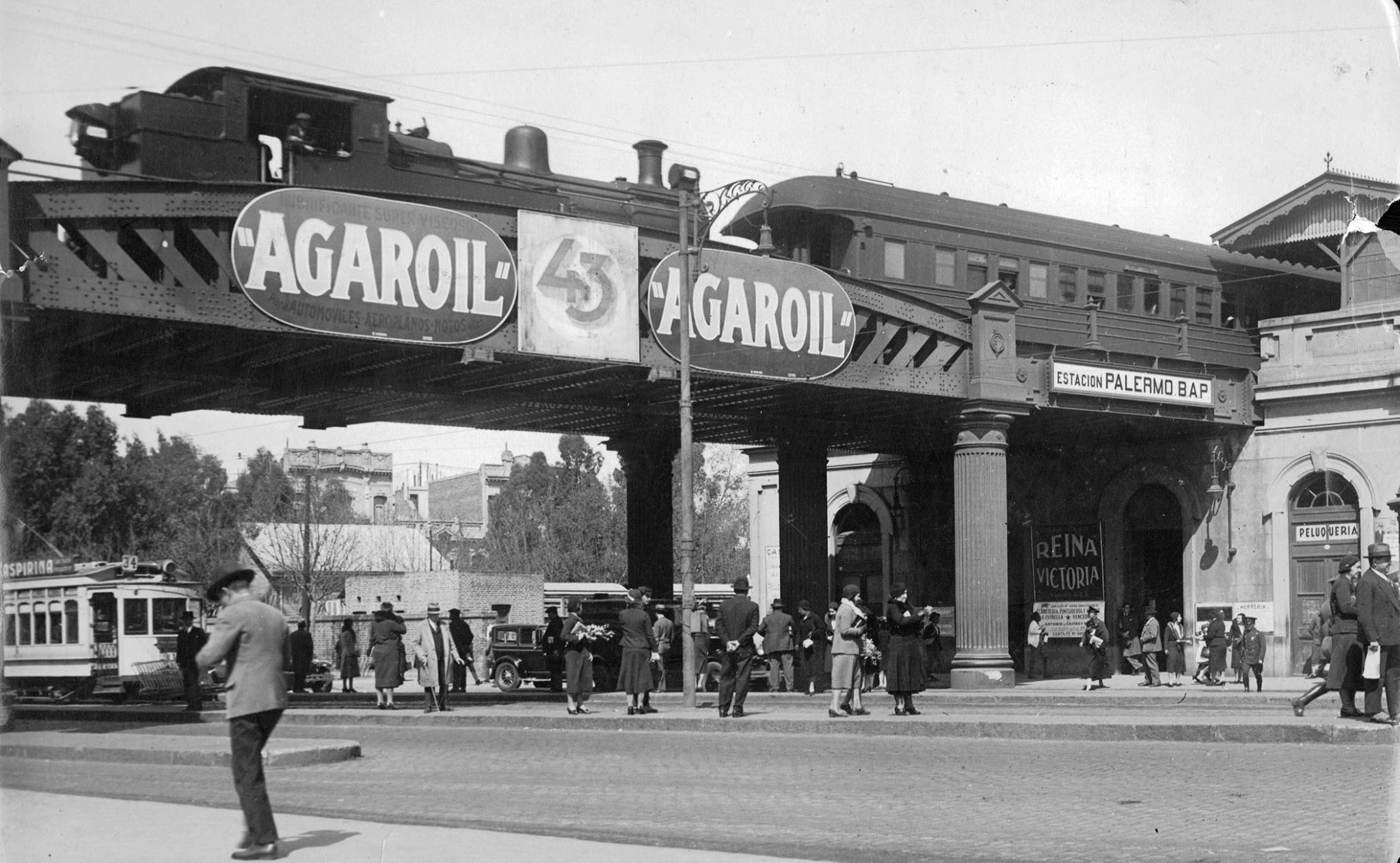
A train crossing Puente Pacífico, c. 1930

In 1898 the BA&P took over the British-owned company Villa Maria and Rufino Railway and a year later John Wynford Philips became chairman of the BA&P, a post he held until 1938. During this period the company developed into a regional amalgamation of companies and dependent lines reaching from Buenos Aires to the Andes and extending from San Juan to Bahía Blanca. In 1907 the Argentine Great Western Railway, which had long been a rival of the BA&P, was taken over.

The line between Buenos Aires and Valparaíso in Chile was finally completed when the link between Mendoza and Santa Rosa de Los Andes in Chile, built by the Transandine Railway company was opened in 1910. In 1908 the BA&P acquired part of a building on Florida Street, in the centre of Buenos Aires, for offices. As a result, the building became known as Edificio Pacífico and since 1990 has housed Galerías Pacífico, a well-known shopping arcade.

During this period, there was interest in electrifying the urban parts of the line in Buenos Aires, today the San Martín Line. Electrification was considered as early as 1907, and more concrete plans emerged in 1947 which included elevating the track through the centre of Buenos Aires, however, with the nationalisation of the railways in 1948, these plans were shelved.

== Nationalisation ==
When the entire Argentine railway network was nationalised in 1948, during Juan Peron's presidency, the BA&P became part of the state-owned company Ferrocarril General San Martín.
