= Andean Railway =

Former railway company in Argentina (1867–1909)

Overview
- Native name: Ferrocarril Andino
- Status: Defunct company; some lines active
- Owner: Government of Argentina
- Locale: Córdoba, San Luis, Mendoza, San Juan
- Termini: Villa María; San Juan

Service
- Type: Inter-city

History
- Opened: 1867
- Closed: 1909; 116 years ago

Technical
- Track gauge: 1,676 mm (5 ft 6 in)
Route map
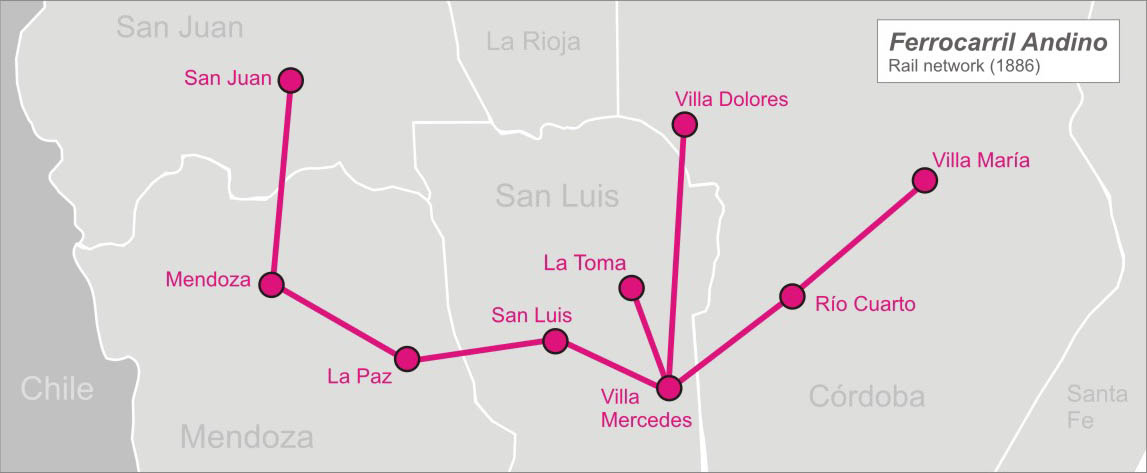

The Andean Railway (native name: Ferrocarril Andino) was a state-owned railway company in Argentina which, towards the end of the 19th century, built and operated a line connecting Villa María in Córdoba Province with the cities of Mendoza, San Luis and San Juan. The 1,676 mm (5 ft 6 in) network was later sold to a number of British-owned railway companies.

== History ==
The first plan to reach the Andes through railway had been carried out with a concession granted to Central Argentine Railway (CAR) and later with the project to make Buenos Aires Western Railway a trans-andean line. The aim of the railway was linking the three provinces of the Cuyo region, San Juan, San Luis and Mendoza with the city of Rosario, via the CAR.

The AR was the first state-owned railway in Argentina and was founded on 15 November 1867 by decree promulgated in November 1867, from Villa María to Villa Nueva, then extending to Río Cuarto.

At the beginning of 1870 the Government signed an agreement to British entrepreneur John Simmons who committed to finish the railway within 3 years at a cost of A$ 26,200 per mile. In November that same years works began.

On October 24, 1873, the Villa María–Río Cuarto section was finished. That same the company started works to extend the line to Villa Mercedes, San Luis, opening the line two years later, totalizing 254 km. President of Argentina Nicolás Avellaneda attended the ceremony.

Once the works finished, the National Government hired J. E. Rogers (whose company had been one of the constructors) to operate the line. The Government required Rogers his employees had to be Argentina-born.

Details of the building of the line are as follows:

Construction
Section	Length, km	Date Opened
Villa María – Río Cuarto	135	24 October 1873
Río Cuarto – Villa Mercedes	120	4 October 1875
Villa Mercedes – Fraga	40	1 August 1881
Fraga – Chorrillos		29 April 1882
Chorrillos – San Luis		8 July 1882
San Luis –La Paz	120	11 August 1883
La Paz – Maipú	135	9 October 1884
Maipú – Mendoza	10	25 April 1885
Mendoza – San Juan	160	6 May 1885

In 1884, the company owned 55 locomotives, 61 passenger cars, 16 baggage cars and 596 freight cars.

In 1886 the AR bought the branch line from Villa Mercedes to La Toma from the ex-Ferrocarril Noroeste a La Rioja and extended it to Villa Dolores to give a branch line with a total length of 226 km.

The construction costs and tariffs of the AR were the lowest of any railway company in Argentina at that time, and when it began to make a profit, the network was sold off to British-owned companies as detailed in Table 2.

Privatisation
Section	Length, km	Date Sold	Buyer
Villa Mercedes – Mendoza	326	1887	Argentine Great Western
Mendoza – San Juan	160	1887	Argentine Great Western
Villa Mercedes - Villa Dolores	226	1909	BA & Pacific
Río Cuarto - Villa Mercedes	120	1909	BA & Pacific
Villa María - Río Cuarto	135	1909	Central Argentine

== See also ==
- Transandine Railway

== Bibliography ==
- British Railways in Argentina 1857-1914: A Case Study of Foreign Investment by Colin Lewis - Athlone Press (for the Institute of Latin American Studies, University of London), 1983
