= Villa Mercedes =

- City
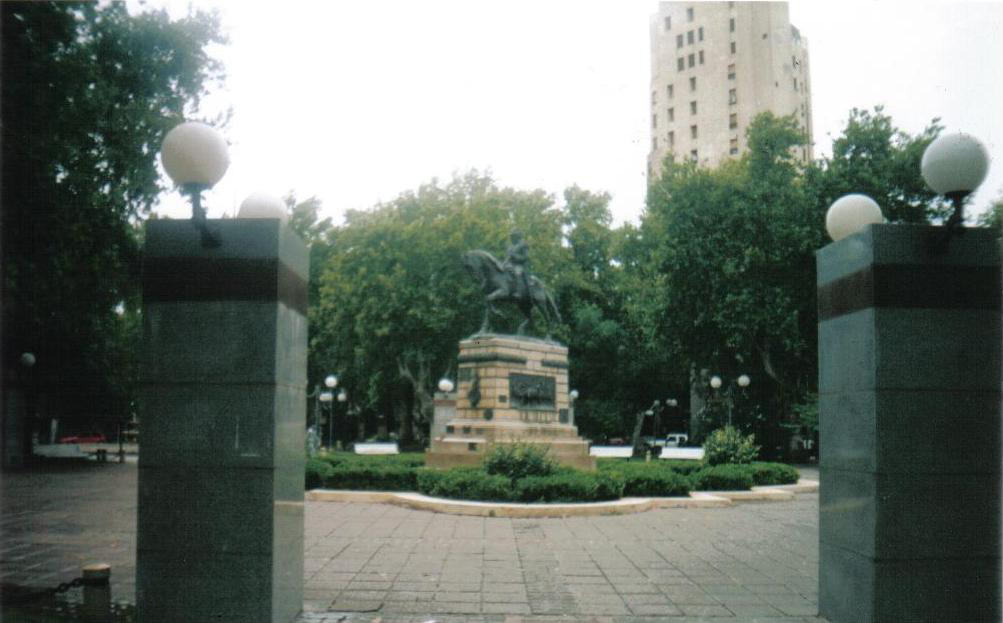
- Plaza principal de Villa Mercedes

- Location of Villa Mercedes in Argentina
- Coordinates: 33°40′S 65°28′W
- Country: Argentina
- Province: San Luis
- Department: General Pedernera

Government
  - Intendant: Maximiliano Germán Frontera (PJ)

Population (2022 census)
  - Total: 131,936
- Time zone: UTC−3 (ART)
- CPA base: D5730
- Dialing code: +54 2657

Villa Mercedes is a city in the province of San Luis, Argentina. It lies on the center-east of the province, on the left-hand banks of the Quinto River, 32 km from the boundary with Córdoba, on National Route 148, and near the intersection of National Routes 8 and 7. National Route 7 links the city to the provincial capital San Luis, 90 km to the north-west. It had 96,781 inhabitants during the 2001 census [INDEC].

== History ==
The city was founded by Governor Justo Daract on or around December 1, 1856, as Fortín Constitucional, a mixed civilian-military fort, to protect the territory against attacks by the Ranquel aboriginal tribes. The original name was changed in 1861 to Villa Mercedes by decision of the residents, who had adopted the Virgin of Mercy (Virgen de las Mercedes) as their patron.

Villa Mercedes grew quickly after a railway line from Villa María on the Central Argentine line between Rosario and Córdoba, reached the town in 1875. Built by the State-owned company Ferrocarril Andino, the line was extended to San Juan in 1885 via San Luis and Mendoza. The line from Villa Mercedes to Mendoza would become the middle section of the route from Buenos Aires and was bought by the Argentine Great Western Railway in 1887 and later became part of the Buenos Aires and Pacific Railway network.

Villa Mercedes was officially declared a city in 1896. It is now the second largest in San Luis, and an industrial and educational center, hosting a branch of the National University of San Luis.

== Geography ==
=== Climate ===
Villa Mercedes has a dry winter humid subtropical climate (Köppen Cwa), typical from the geographic center of Argentina. Summer is warm to hot with frequent thunderstorms, whereas winter is dry and prone to heavy frosts. Snowfall is unusual but still more common than in Eastern Argentina, and occasionally it can stay on the ground for a couple of days, for example, during the July 2007 Argentine winter storm, when the temperature hit -16.8 °C, the lowest on record for the city.

Climate data for Villa Mercedes INTA (1981–2010, extremes 1968–2013)
Month	Jan	Feb	Mar	Apr	May	Jun	Jul	Aug	Sep	Oct	Nov	Dec	Year
Record high °C (°F)	41.2 (106.2)	41.7 (107.1)	37.7 (99.9)	35.4 (95.7)	33.0 (91.4)	30.8 (87.4)	33.9 (93.0)	37.1 (98.8)	38.0 (100.4)	42.1 (107.8)	39.6 (103.3)	42.7 (108.9)	42.7 (108.9)
Mean daily maximum °C (°F)	29.9 (85.8)	29.1 (84.4)	27.0 (80.6)	23.4 (74.1)	20.0 (68.0)	17.0 (62.6)	16.5 (61.7)	19.0 (66.2)	21.2 (70.2)	24.4 (75.9)	27.0 (80.6)	29.2 (84.6)	23.7 (74.7)
Daily mean °C (°F)	22.5 (72.5)	21.4 (70.5)	19.4 (66.9)	15.2 (59.4)	11.4 (52.5)	8.1 (46.6)	7.3 (45.1)	9.5 (49.1)	12.3 (54.1)	16.4 (61.5)	19.3 (66.7)	21.8 (71.2)	15.4 (59.7)
Mean daily minimum °C (°F)	14.9 (58.8)	13.9 (57.0)	12.3 (54.1)	7.8 (46.0)	3.7 (38.7)	0.2 (32.4)	−0.9 (30.4)	0.8 (33.4)	3.7 (38.7)	8.2 (46.8)	11.2 (52.2)	14.0 (57.2)	7.5 (45.5)
Record low °C (°F)	2.9 (37.2)	1.2 (34.2)	−2.2 (28.0)	−6.9 (19.6)	−10.5 (13.1)	−12.5 (9.5)	−16.8 (1.8)	−14.8 (5.4)	−12.3 (9.9)	−6.4 (20.5)	−6.0 (21.2)	0.1 (32.2)	−16.8 (1.8)
Average precipitation mm (inches)	120.2 (4.73)	90.4 (3.56)	86.0 (3.39)	54.4 (2.14)	26.4 (1.04)	6.7 (0.26)	16.3 (0.64)	13.4 (0.53)	32.2 (1.27)	49.5 (1.95)	76.6 (3.02)	117.0 (4.61)	689.1 (27.13)
Average snowy days	0	0	0	0	0	0.2	0.5	0.3	0	0	0	0	1.0
Average relative humidity (%)	65.6	69.8	74.0	73.0	74.7	73.0	68.8	61.2	58.7	60.8	59.4	63.0	66.8
Mean monthly sunshine hours	293.0	255.4	226.9	191.4	167.6	159.0	188.1	206.1	226.8	247.5	281.1	307.4	2,750.3
Source 1: Instituto Nacional de Tecnología Agropecuaria
Source 2: Atlas Bioclimático de Argentina UNLP (snowfall data)

== Transportation ==
It is served by Villa Reynolds Airport.
