= Saldías station =

Railway station in Buenos Aires, Argentina

Saldías
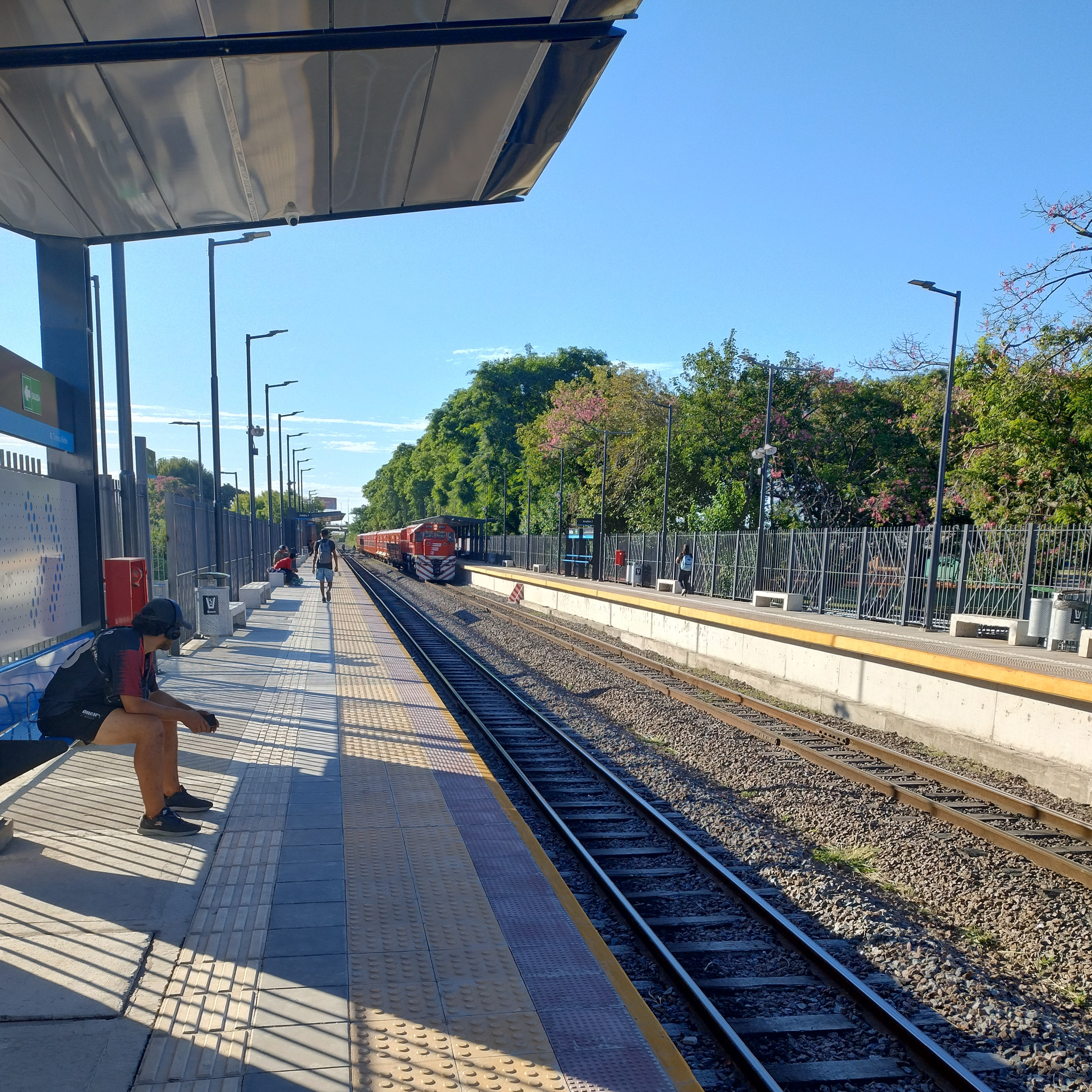
- Saldías station in 2024

General information
- Location: Belgrano, Buenos Aires; Argentina
- Coordinates: 34.58°S 58.4°W
- System: Commuter rail
- Owner: Government of Argentina
- Operator: Ferrovías
- Line: Belgrano Norte Line
- Platforms: 2
- Tracks: 2

History
- Opened: 1912; 114 years ago (rebuilt in 2024)
Location

Saldías is a railway station located at the boundary between the Recoleta and Palermo barrios of Buenos Aires, Argentina. The station is part of Belgrano Norte Line, between Retiro and Ciudad Universitaria stations.

== Overview ==
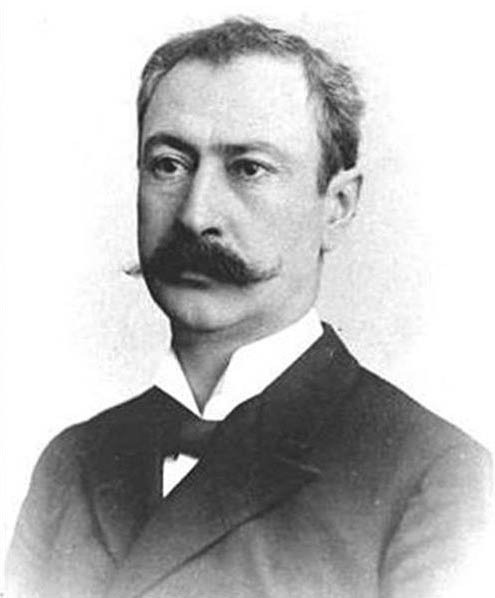
The station was named after Adolfo Saldías

It is currently operated by private company Ferrovías which serves all regular services since it took the concession in 1994.

The station is named after Argentinian historian, lawyer, politician, soldier and diplomat Adolfo Saldías (1849-1914). Saldías was an affiliate to the Radical Civic Union which served in Buenos Aires Province as minister and then vice-governor.

On the other hand, state-owned Trenes Argentinos is operator for differential services only, served by Emepa Alerce DMUs). That service (only three stops from Del Viso to Retiro) started in 2015.

== Gallery ==
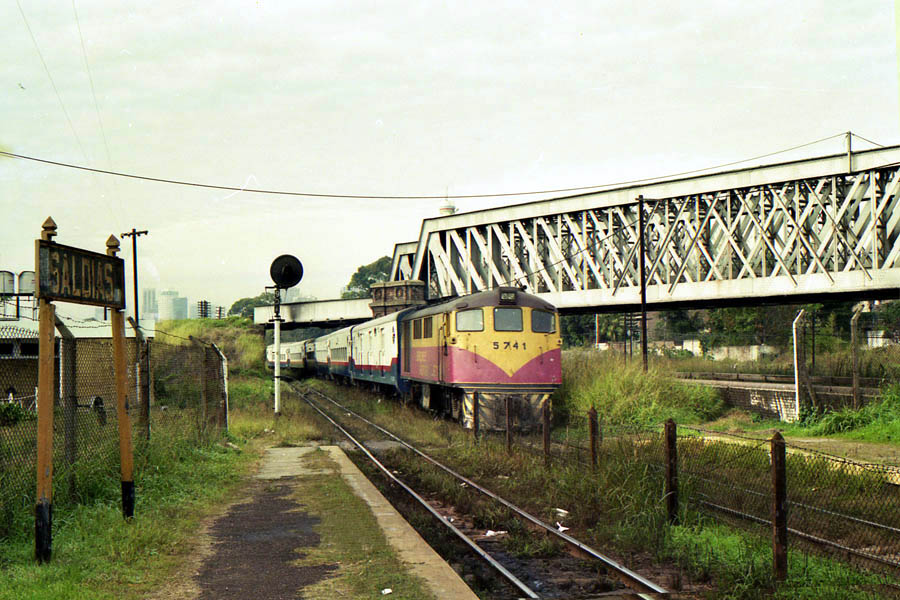
Train in Saldías

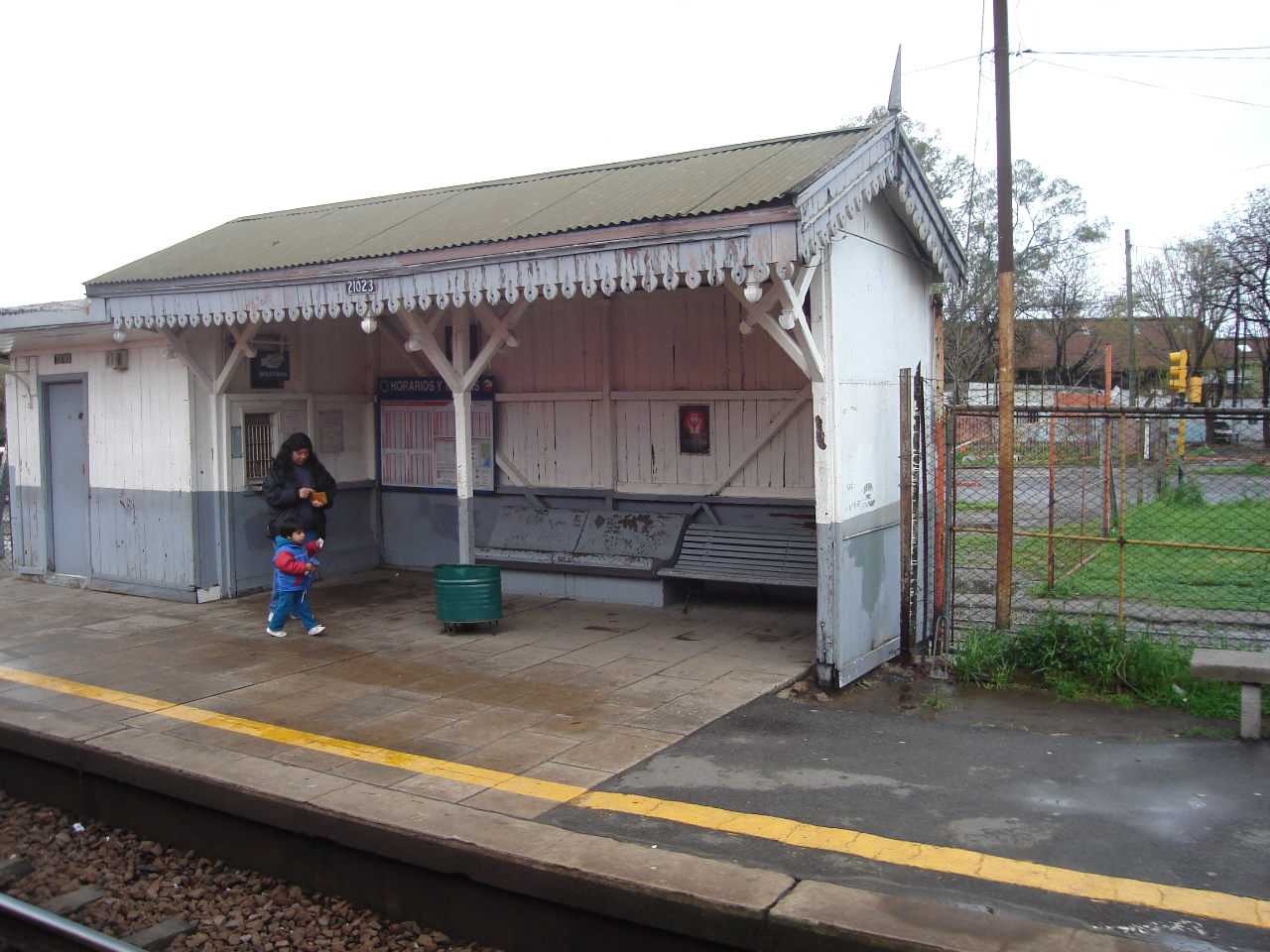
Station in 2007

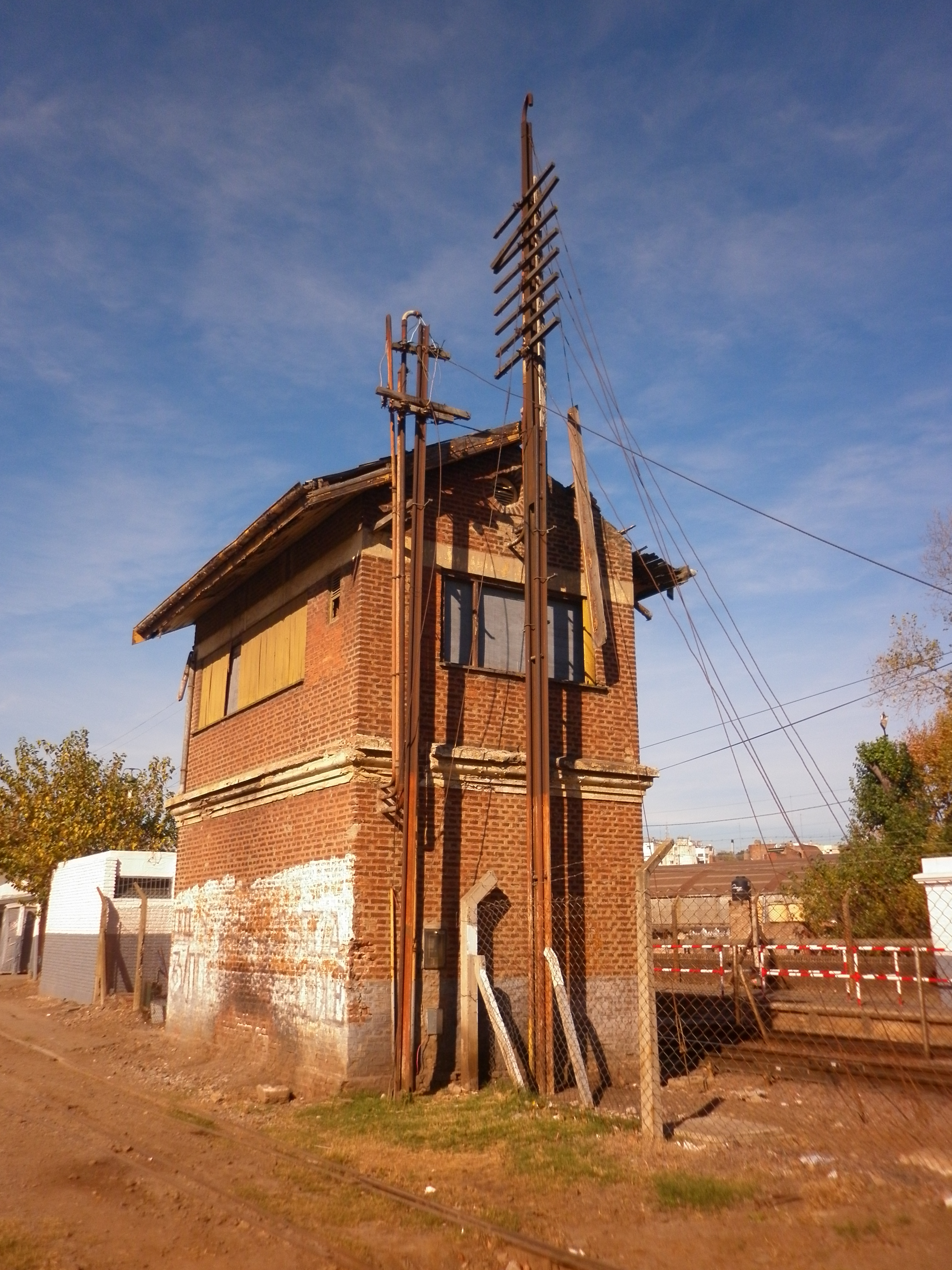
Old cabin

== See also ==
- Belgrano Norte Line
- Ferrovías
