= Saldías =

Saldías may refer to:

== People ==
- Adolfo Saldías (1849–1914), Argentinian historian, lawyer, politician, soldier and diplomat
- Álvaro Lara Saldías (1984–2011), Chilean football player
- Antonio Saldías (born 1951), Chilean writer
- Marciano Saldías (born 1966), Bolivian football player
- Roberto Saldías (born 1993), Chilean football player
- Roque Augusto Saldías Maninat (1892–1974), Venezuelan-born Peruvian admiral and politician
- Washington Saldías Fuentealba (1927–1989), Chilean politician
- Washington Saldías González (born 1949), Chilean politician

== Places ==
- Saldías, Navarre, Spain
- Saldías station, Buenos Aires, Argentina
