= Belgrano Norte Line =

Commuter rail service in Buenos Aires

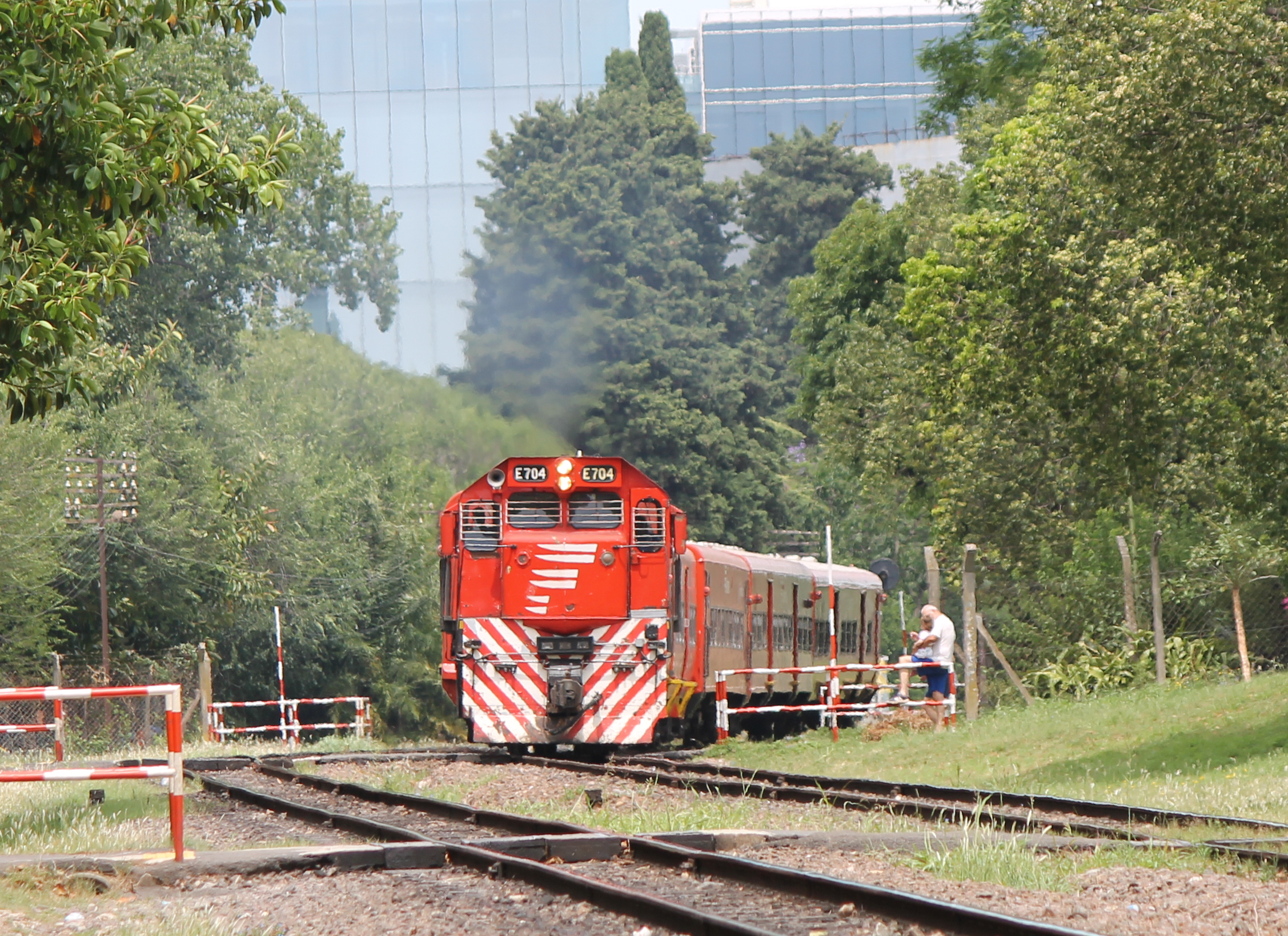
- Train operated by Ferrovías, pictured in 2020

Overview
- Service type: Urban rail
- Status: Operating
- Locale: Buenos Aires Province
- Predecessor: Córdoba Central Railway
- First service: 1948; 77 years ago
- Current operator: Ferrovías
- Former operator: FEMESA
- Annual ridership: 16,375,539 (2019)
- Website: Official site

Route
- Termini: Retiro; Villa Rosa
- Stops: 22
- Distance travelled: 55 km (34 mi)
- Average journey time: 65–80 minutes
- Service frequency: 10 minutes

On-board services
- Class: Standard class only
- Baggage facilities: Overhead racks

Technical
- Rolling stock: EMD Locomotives; Emepa Alerce
- Track gauge: 1,000 mm (3 ft 3 3/8 in)

The Belgrano Norte line is a commuter rail service in Buenos Aires, Argentina run by the private company Ferrovías since 1 April 1994. This service had previously been run by the state-owned General Belgrano Railway since nationalisation of the railways in 1948. Ferrovías also formed part of the temporary consortium (2005–2014) Unidad de Gestión Operativa Ferroviaria de Emergencia (UGOFE), which operated other commuter rail services in Buenos Aires.

The Belgrano Norte line service operates from Retiro station, in the centre of Buenos Aires, through the northern Buenos Aires suburbs to the town of Villa Rosa in Pilar Partido. The metre gauge line was built by the British-owned Córdoba Central Railway which was bought by the State in 1939 and was later integrated into Ferrocarril General Manuel Belgrano in 1948 when the entire Argentine railway network was nationalised.

There are a total of 22 stations along the 55 km (34 mi) long railway line and the journey along the entire length of the line takes roughly one hour and twenty minutes for the regular service and one hour and five minutes for the differential service. During peak hours, trains run approximately every 8 minutes and an estimated 42 million passengers are transported each year.

== History ==
=== First steps and development ===
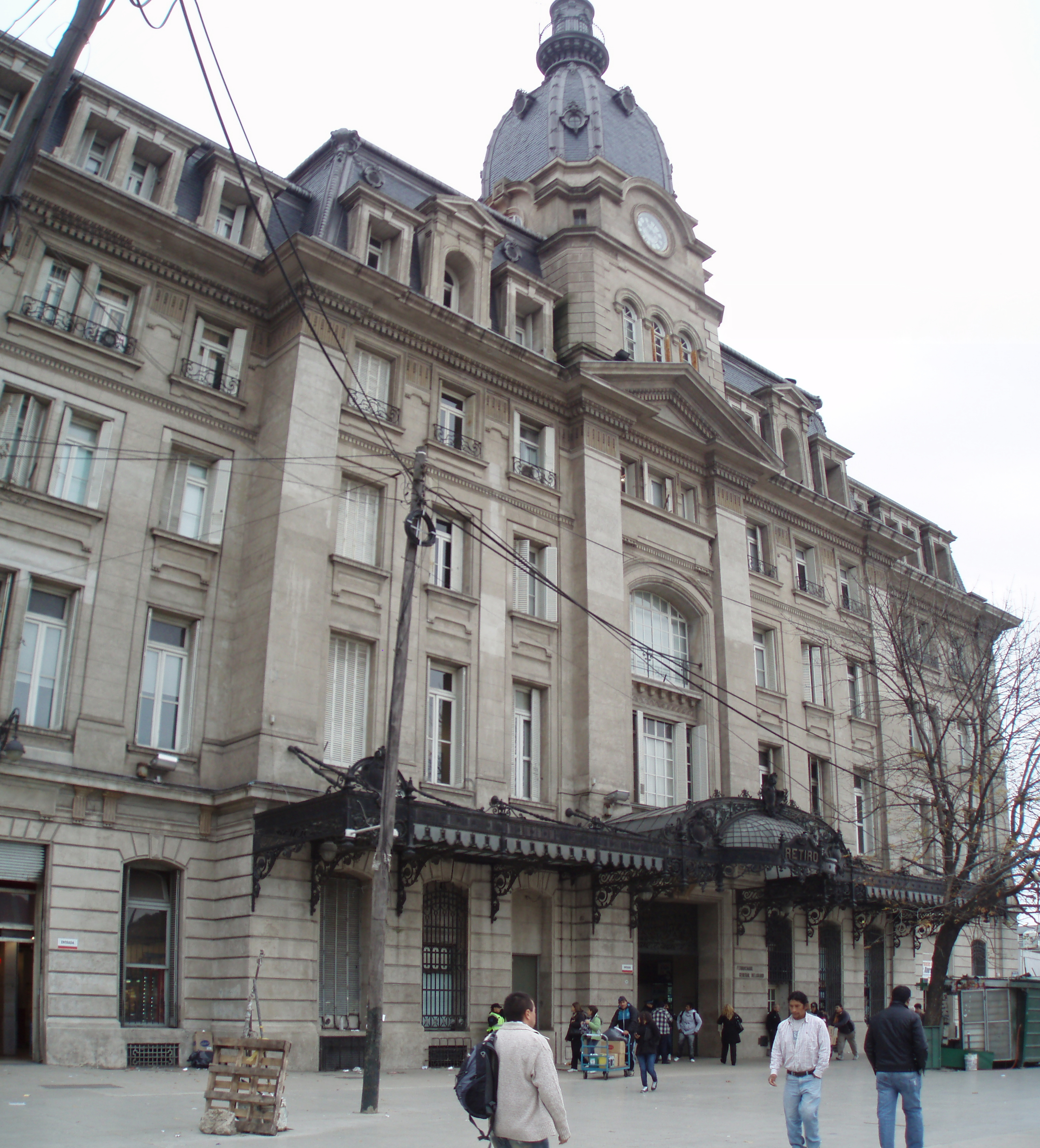
Retiro, terminus of the line

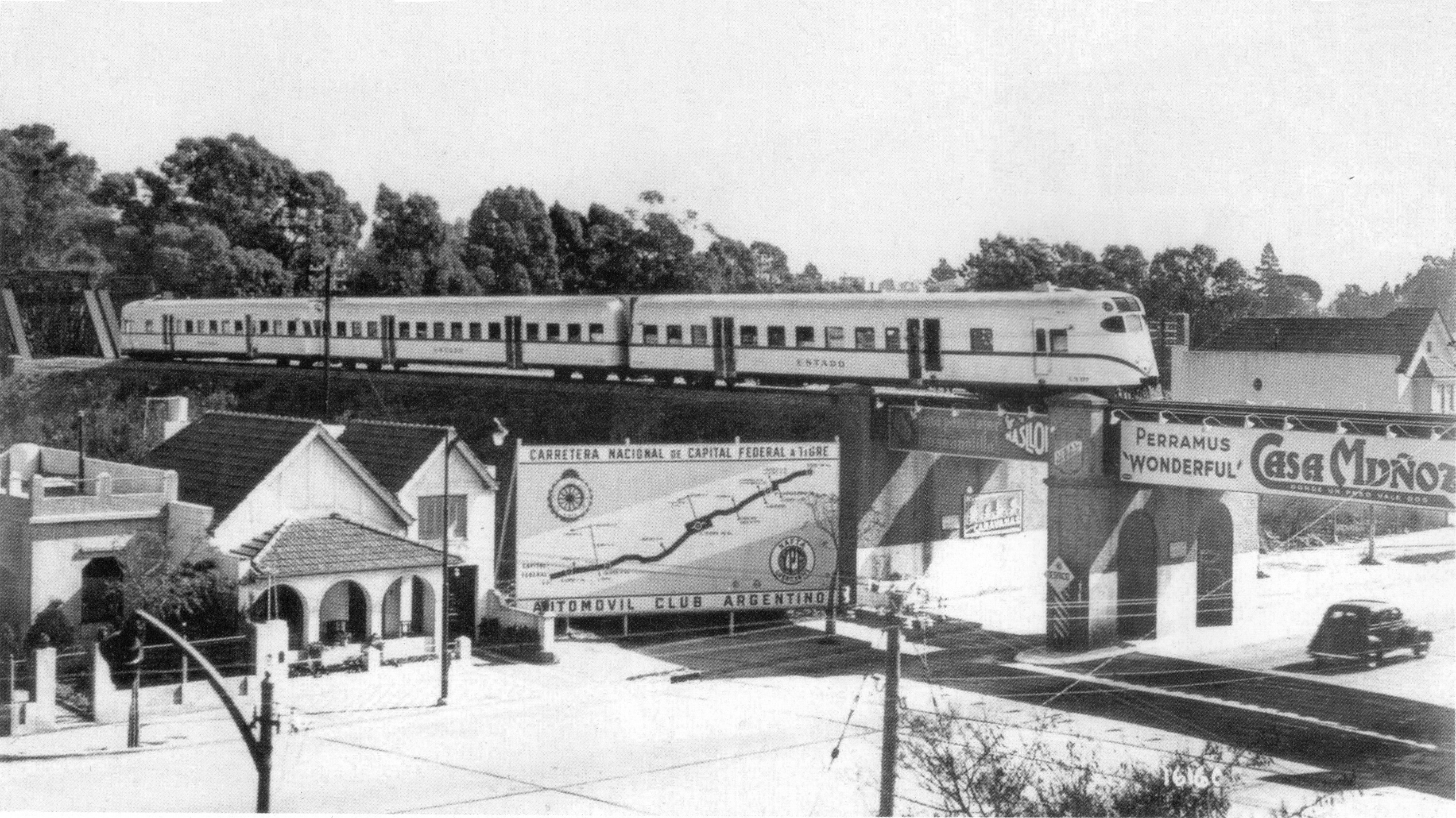
Ganz Works railcar crossing Avenida del Libertador in Vicente López Partido

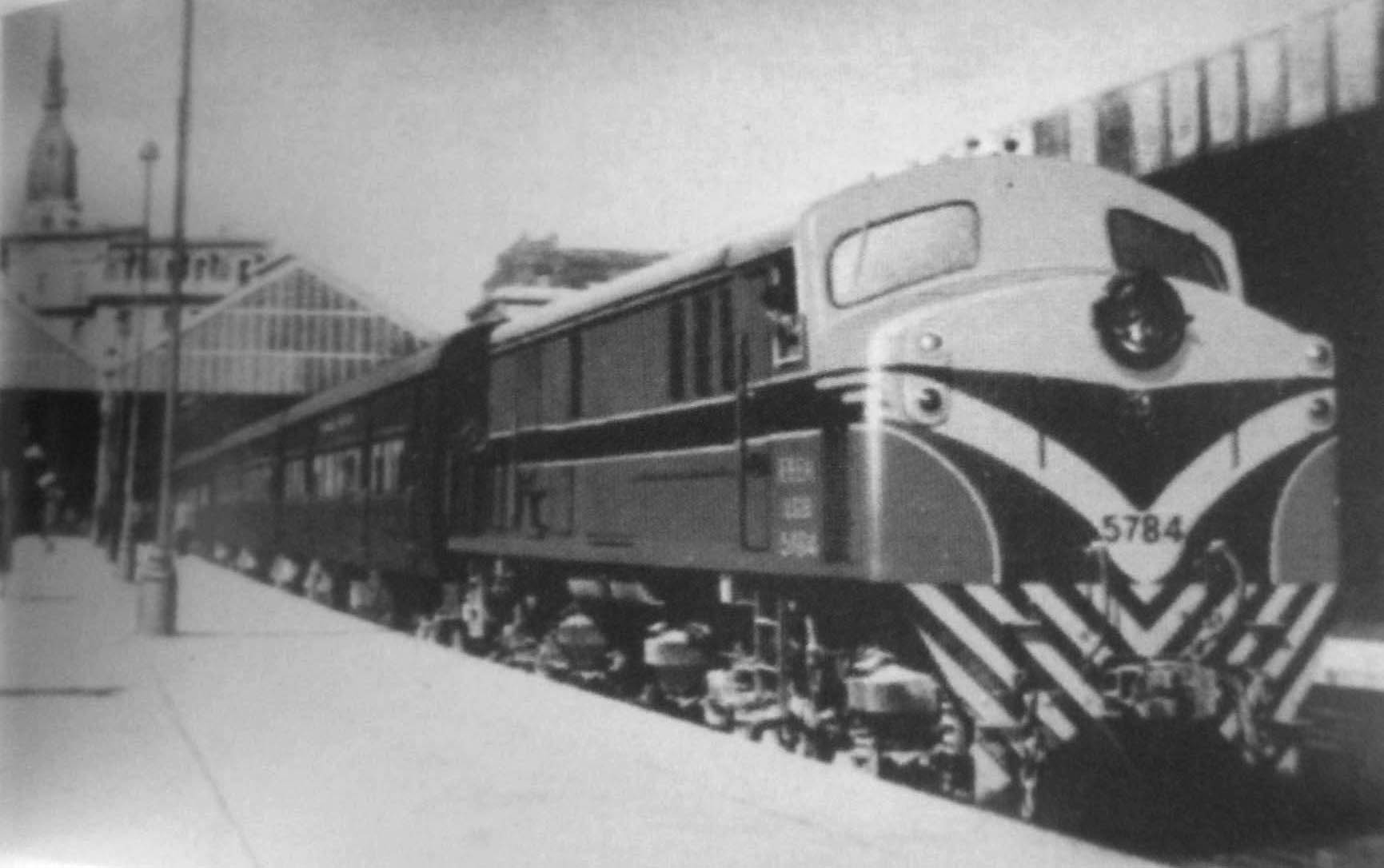
English Electric locomotive in Retiro, 1959

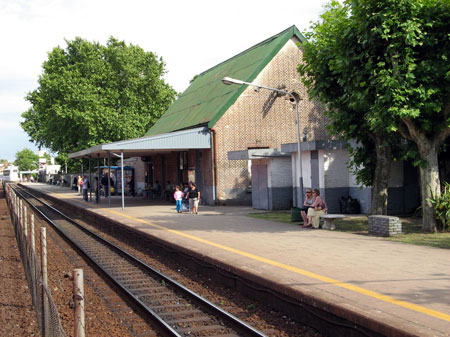
Munro station

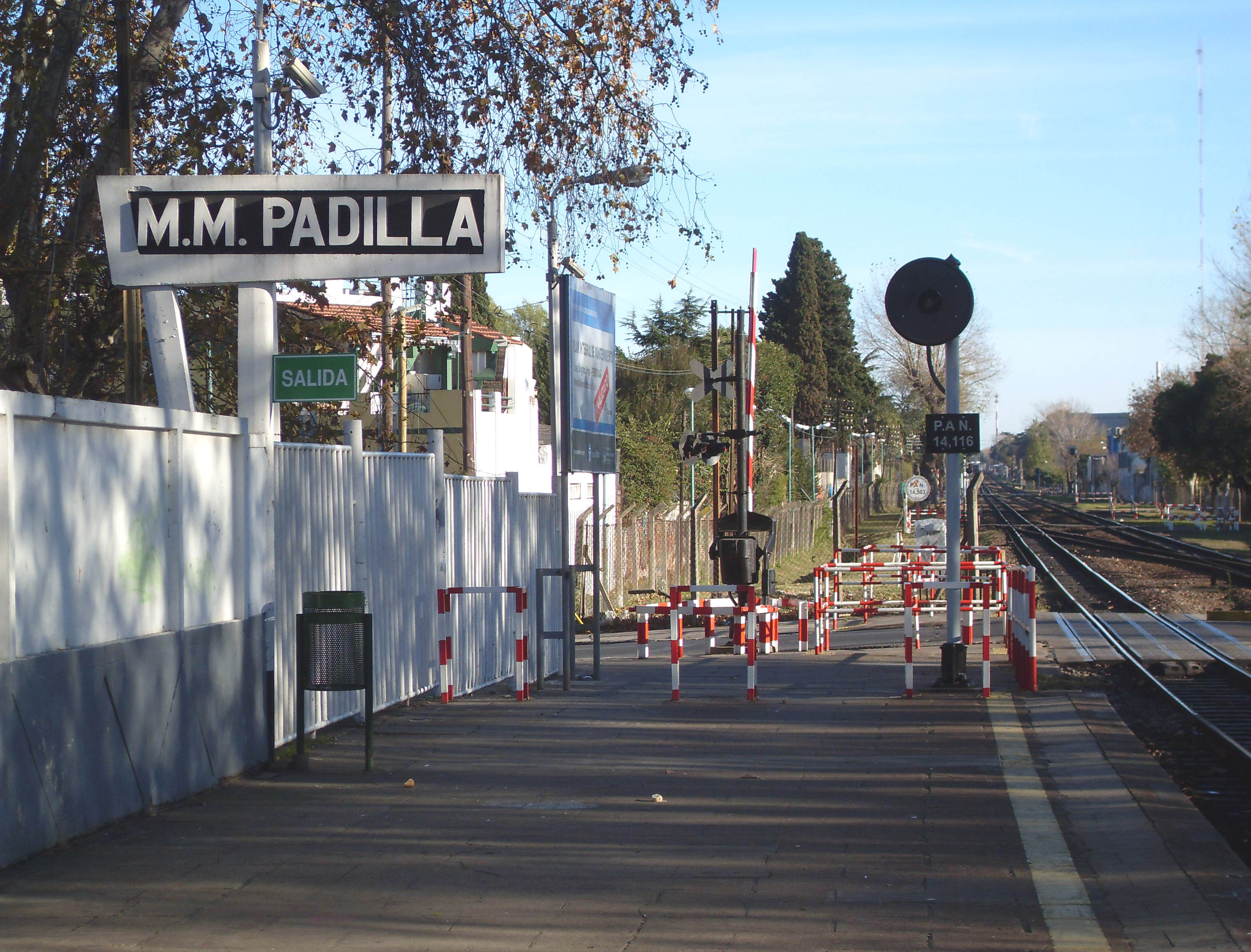
Railway signalling by GRS in M. Padilla, 2015

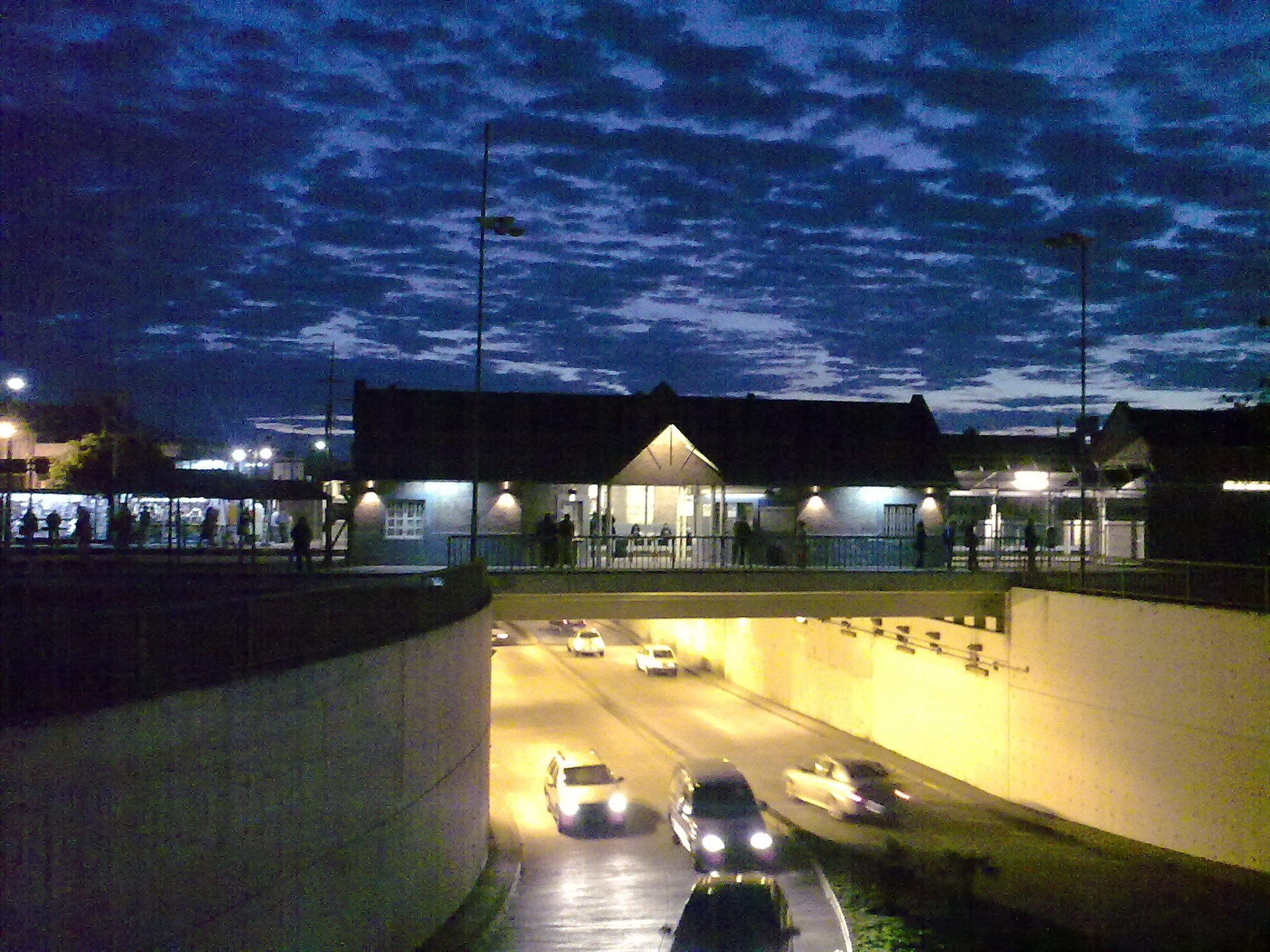
Villa Adelina station and low level crossing

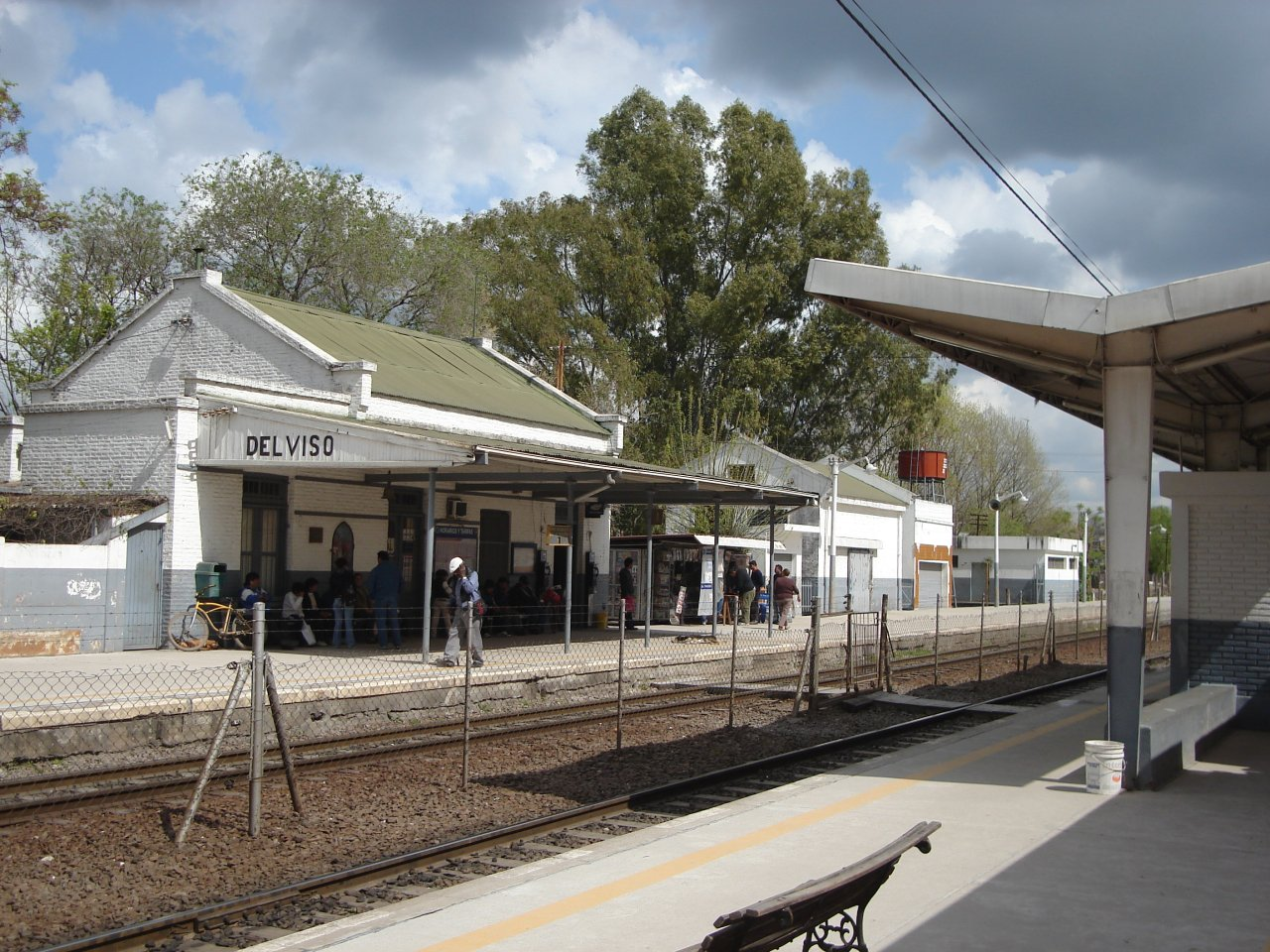
Del Viso station

The line was part of the Córdoba Central Railway (CCR), specifically the branch from the city of Rosario to Retiro, Buenos Aires. The CCR would become part of General Belgrano Railway network when the Government of Argentina nationalised French and British companies in 1948.

In 1903 the company was authorised to extend the railway to Boulogne Sur Mer in Greater Buenos Aires and work began three years later. In 1909 the line was finally opened. Trains departed from Rosario, finishing the journey in Villa Adelina, named in honour of Adelina Munro Drysdale, the General Manager's granddaughter. The trains stopped at the other four stations in existence at the time: Villa Rosa, Del Viso, Los Polvorines and Don Torcuato.

In 1912, the line was extended to Retiro in central Buenos Aires. Other stations were opened, such as Munro (named in memory of Duncan McKay Munro) and "Kilómetro 14", later renamed "Juan B. Justo" in commemoration of the founder of the Socialist Party of Argentina.

Between Juan B. Justo and Retiro, tracks had to cross over the Maipú Avenue in Vicente López Partido, so a railway bridge was built. This bridge was named "Puente Saavedra". A short time after that, a new station, "Km. 12" was built near the bridge and renamed "Aristóbulo del Valle" in the 1920s.

The current Florida station was initially opened as a railway stop along the way. In 1913, when the San Martín Avenue was paved, a storage property of the Narciso Agüero & Cía company was established there. For that reason, the stop was named "Parada Agüero" for a period.

In 1931, the Juan B. Justo station had its name changed to M.M. Padilla to avoid being confused with the station of the same name that belongs to the Mitre Line, only a few blocks away. During the 1930s, the "Km. 18" station was established and many names were proposed (Ader, Drysdale, La Tahona, among others) until the National Academy of History suggested "Carapachay", which was chosen in 1946.

While the line was operated by the State-owned company Argentine State Railway, in 1938 brand new Ganz Works railcars were acquired to serve on the Retiro-Villa Rosa and Don Torcuato-Campo de Mayo lines. Between 1947 and 1948, 50 coaches made at the Tafí Viejo workshops and 70 Whitcomb diesel locomotives were added to the Belgrano Norte's fleet, sharing duties with the Ganz railcars.

=== Ferrocarriles Argentinos ===
Due to Córdoba Central Railway's financial problems, the Government of Argentina took over the company and began operating the trains. In 1949 the line was merged into the then recently created General Belgrano Railway, which incorporated all of the country's 1,000 mm (3 ft 3 3/8 in) rail lines. Local services were run by Ferrocarriles Argentinos under the name "Belgrano Norte" to distinguish it from the Belgrano Sur Line. In 1955, 30 Werkspoor locomotives were acquired and, as a result, Ferrocarriles Argentinos removed the Ganz vehicles from service on the Belgrano Norte line, sending them to Córdoba to serve local railways there.

Four years later, a fleet of 21 English Electric locomotives arrived to replace the Whitcomb and Werkspoor locomotives. In 1961 the Government led by President Arturo Frondizi closed several railway lines, with the Don Torcuato-Campo de Mayo line among them. In 1964, 27 coaches built by Aerfer, an Argentine subsidiary of FIAT Ferroviaria, were added to the line. Four years later, the fleet size was increased with the addition of 20 coaches built by local company Materfer, which replaced the old ones made in Tafí Viejo. As a result, the English Electric locomotives operated alongside the Aerfer and Werkspoor coaches.

In 1965 a group of residents raised the funds to build a new railway stop, named "Km. 42", which was then changed to "Manuel Alberti". In 1975 Materfer supplied more coaches ("FIAT IIIs") for the line. That same year, some stations (such as Padilla, Florida and Aristóbulo del Valle) were completely remodelled. One year later, the first grade crossing signals and gates by General Railway Signal (GRS) were installed at the main level crossings of the line.

In 1972, the first G22 diesel locomotives manufactured by General Motors' Electro Motive Division were delivered to the Belgrano Norte line. These were the CU version, adapted to run on metre-gauge railways. From then on, the locomotives were built by the local licensee Astarsa at its factory in San Fernando.

To strengthen local services to Villa Rosa, 20 brand new G22 were purchased in 1980. These locomotives were built by the Argentine company Astarsa, replacing the English Electric locomotives which were sent to the Belgrano Sur Line. The last station to be inaugurated was Tierras Altas in 1990.

=== Privatisation: Ferrovías ===
In 1991, the state-owned company FEMESA temporarily took over the Belgrano Norte line (along with all the other suburban railway lines) until it was given in concession to the private company Ferrovías in 1994, as part of the privatisation process carried out by President Carlos Menem.

Some improvements made by Ferrovías included the acquisition of 17 railcars (built by Alstom in 1977) which were to serve from Vicente López and Avellaneda, crossing the Puerto Madero and La Boca neighbourhoods of Buenos Aires, a length of 24 km. However, the project was never carried out and the Alstom vehicles were sent to the Tren de las Sierras instead.

In 2014 the national government began building the Ciudad Universitaria station. The new station, opened in August 2015, replaced Scalabrini Ortiz (located 700 metres to the south of it). Ciudad Universitaria connects the University of Buenos Aires (UBA) campus (known as "Ciudad Universitaria" from which it took the name) by a bridge which allows students to reach the University facilities without the risk of traffic accidents. It was initially announced that construction would be concluded by March 2015 at a cost of AR$48 million. However in June 2015 it was announced that it was "completed and awaiting its opening" by the Ministry. Finally, the station was opened at the end of August 2015, providing rail access for the 40,000 people who attend the UBA campus each day.

Another proposed station was "Aeroparque", which would join the railway station with Aeroparque Jorge Newbery airport. The original project saw the addition of a pedestrian tunnel to be built between the station and the airport. However, in 2015 it was announced that this station's construction was cancelled with the Ministry of the Interior and Transport citing a possible increase in security concerns at the airport with the inclusion of a station.

=== State-run services ===
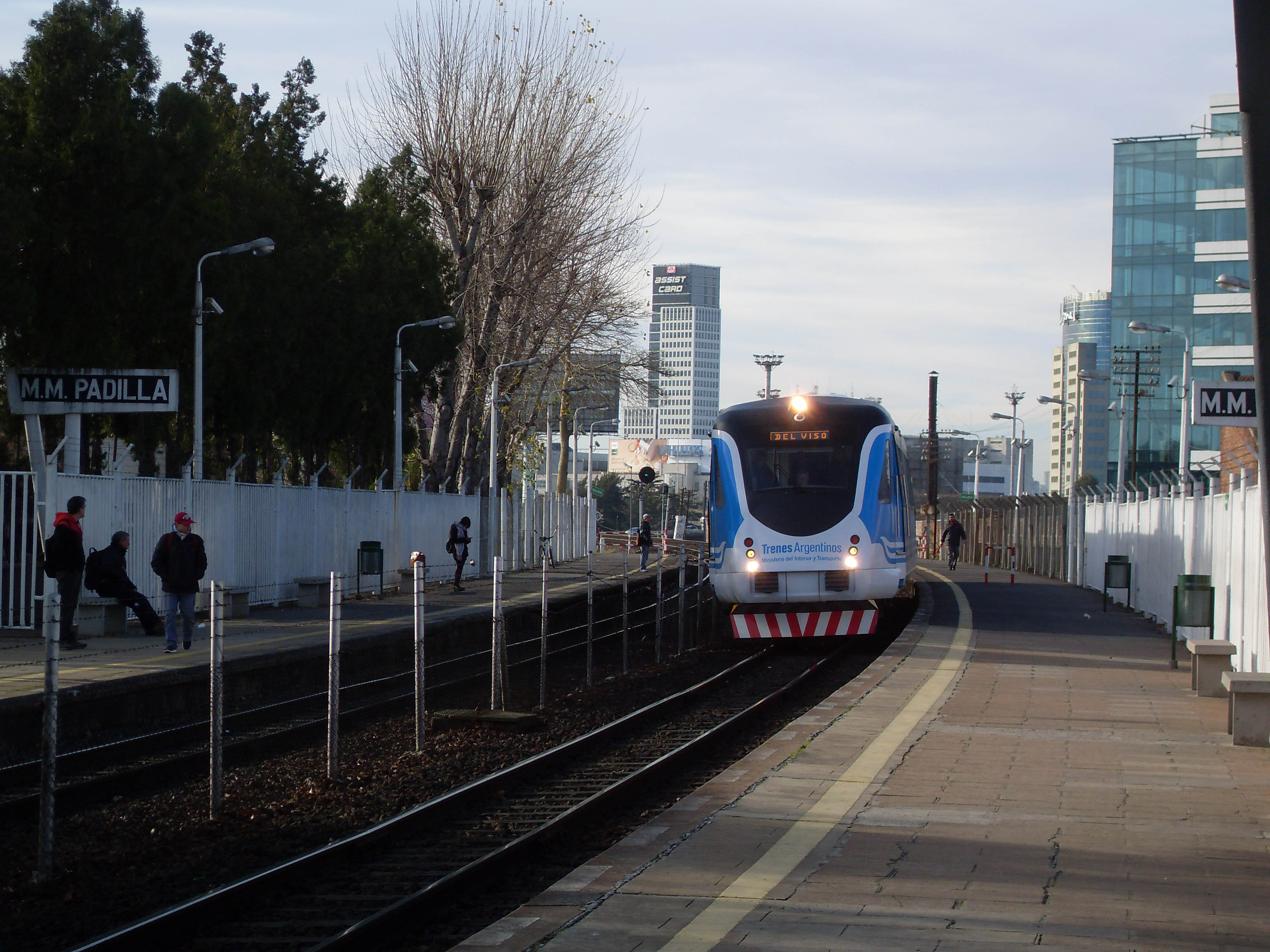
A Trenes Argentinos Emepa Alerce railcar passing M. M. Padilla station

In March 2015, the Ministry of Transport announced the purchase of Alerce trains manufactured by the Emepa Group, the first train completely built in Argentina, to run on the Belgrano Norte Line. A fleet of 20 diesel multiple units were to be built and put into operation as an express service covering the Retiro-Boulogne Sur Mer section, with only two intermediate stops, Ciudad Universitaria and Aristóbulo del Valle. For a second phase of the project, the service would be extended to Pilar. Construction of the first train was completed in the Grupo Emepa's workshops at Chascomús in March 2015.

The new service with Alerce DMUs started operations on 13 July 2015 with three Alerce trains, with the other 17 trains added to the line at a rate of one per month as they were completed by Emepa. The trains run from Del Viso to Retiro with a journey time of 65 minutes. The Alerce DMUs' comfort features include HVAC and Wi-Fi. Unlike the rest of the line, the service is operated by the state-owned Trenes Argentinos rather than Ferrovías.

The service begins at Retiro Belgrano railway station and stops at the University of Buenos Aires' Ciudad Universitaria campus, Aristóbulo del Valle and terminates at Del Viso in Pilar Partido with prices (as of July 2025) ranging from AR$ 1.50 to AR$17 with a SUBE card and AR$3 to AR$34 without a SUBE card. The service's route was altered from its original plans, skipping the Boulogne Sur Mer station and the proposed new station at Aeroparque Jorge Newbery airport that was not built.

In January 2024, a new station, "Cecilia Grierson" (named after the first woman to receive a Medical Degree in Argentina) was opened in Pilar Partido. The station (which originally was given the name "Panamericana") is located on km 46 of Acceso Norte as an intermediate stop between Del Viso and Villa Rosa stations. The opening was delayed several times so works took more than 10 years. It is the first Belgrano Norte station since the inauguration of Tierras Altas in 1988, when the line was still operated by the defunct company Ferrocarriles Argentinos.

=== Historic operators ===
Companies that have operated the Belgrano Norte Line since it was established after the 1948 nationalisation are:

Operator	Period
Ferrocarriles Argentinos	1948–1991
FEMESA	1991–1994
Ferrovías	1994–present

== Rolling stock ==
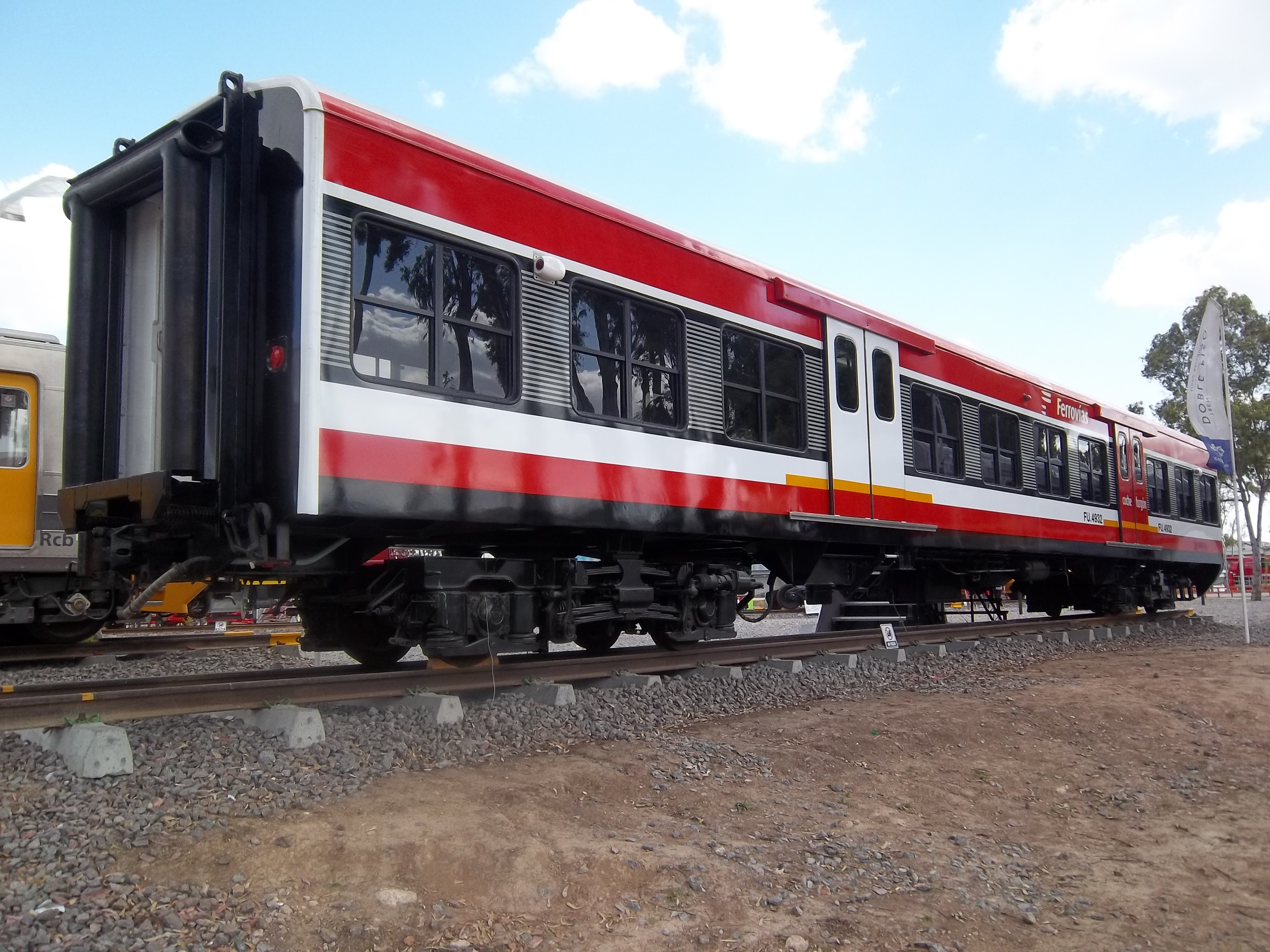
One of the line's carriages exhibited at Tecnopolis

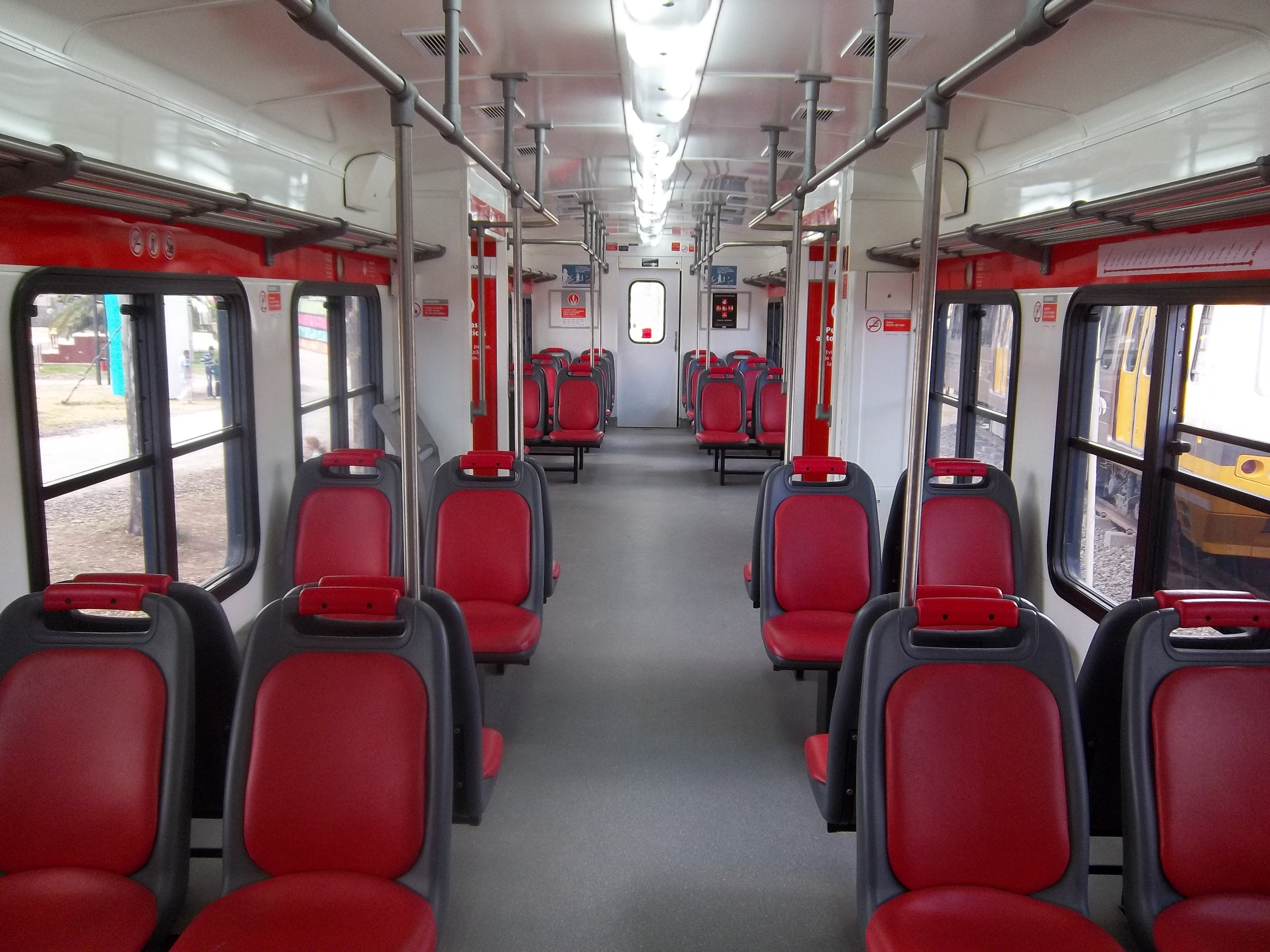
Interior of one of the carriages

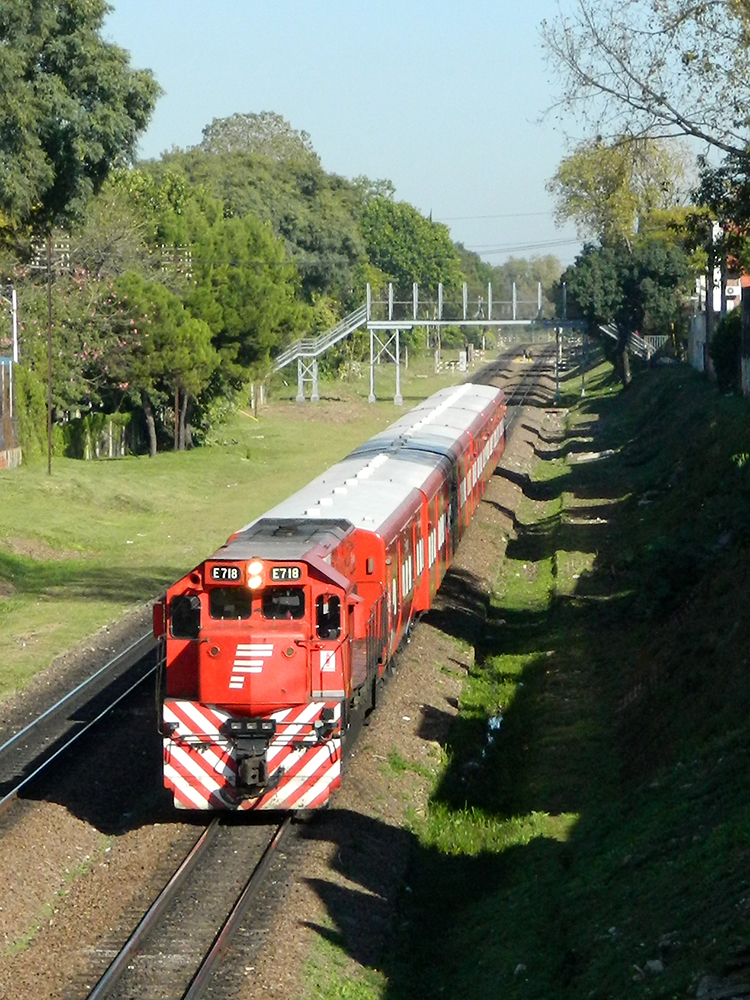
Diesel-Electric rolling stock

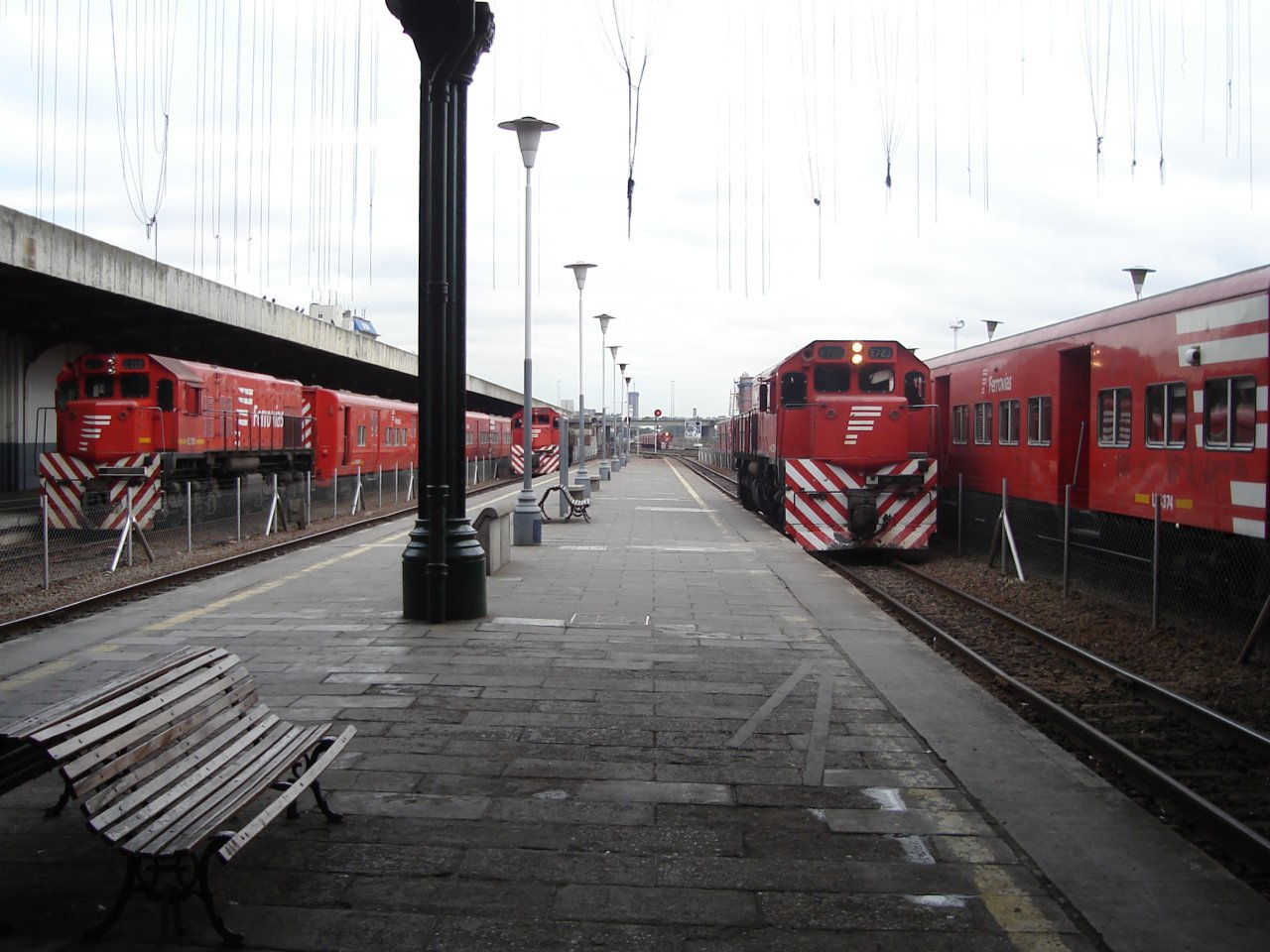
Trains in Retiro

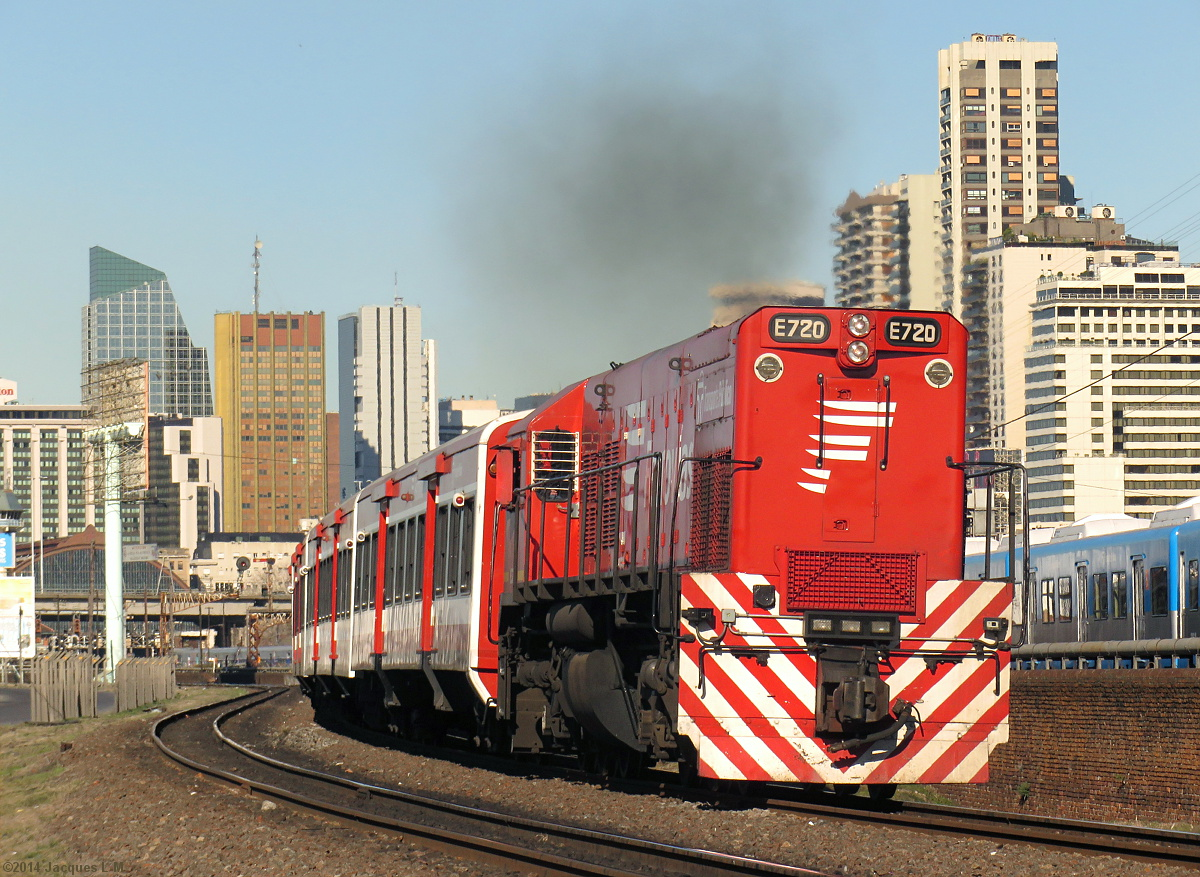
Train leaving Retiro station

== See also ==
- Belgrano Sur Line
- Ferrovías
- General Belgrano Railway

== Bibliography ==
- Historia del Ferrocarril al Norte del Gran Buenos Aires: Ferrocarriles Mitre y Belgrano by Ariel Bernasconi, Dunken Editorial, 2012. ISBN 978-9870257691.
