= Emepa Alerce =

Argentine train used on commuter rail services

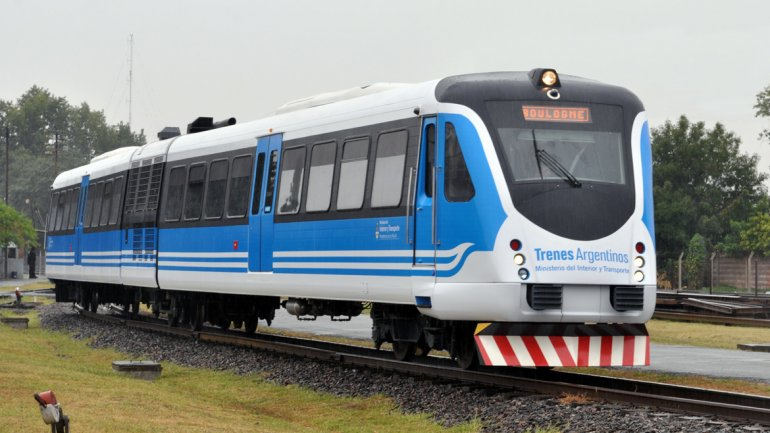
- An Alerce pictured in 2015
- Manufacturer: Emepa Group
- Built at: Chascomús
- Constructed: 2015
- Entered service: 2015; 10 years ago
- Number built: 20
- Formation: 2 cars per trainset
- Capacity: 120 per car
- Operators: Trenes Argentinos
- Lines served: Belgrano Norte; Tren de las Sierras; Salta – Güemes

Specifications
- Doors: 2 per side
- Track gauge: 1,000 mm (3 ft 3 3/8 in), 5 ft 6 in (1,676 mm)

The Alerce is an Argentine railcar produced by the Emepa Group in Chascomús, Buenos Aires Province. As of 2015, the units are produced for the General Belgrano Railway's narrow gauge network and are currently used on commuter rail services, though a broad gauge variant is currently in the works. They are designed to be easily converted into Electric Multiple Units, though only diesel variants have been produced to date. The Alerce's namesake is the common name of Fitzroya cupressoides, a coniferous tree native to Argentina and Chile.

== Overview ==
The first prototype of the Alerce began circulating the Belgrano Norte Line on test runs in 2012 from Boulogne Sur Mer to Retiro Belgrano railway station and the National Government then decided to purchase 20 trains from Emepa for use on the line. Each train has a capacity for 240 passengers and feature intelligent doors, air conditioning, security cameras, disabled access and Wi-Fi.

The Alerce's engine is located between the two carriages on its own articulated bogie with an access corridor between the two carriages. The trains use 90% of its parts from Argentine origin, with the remaining 10% being specialised parts imported from abroad, such as the German brakes and Austrian intelligent doors. The trains are also designed to be easily converted into Electric Multiple Units should the lines they run on be electrified.

In June 2015 it was announced that Emepa would produce a broad gauge variant of the Alerce for use on local service on the General Roca Railway.

== Usage ==
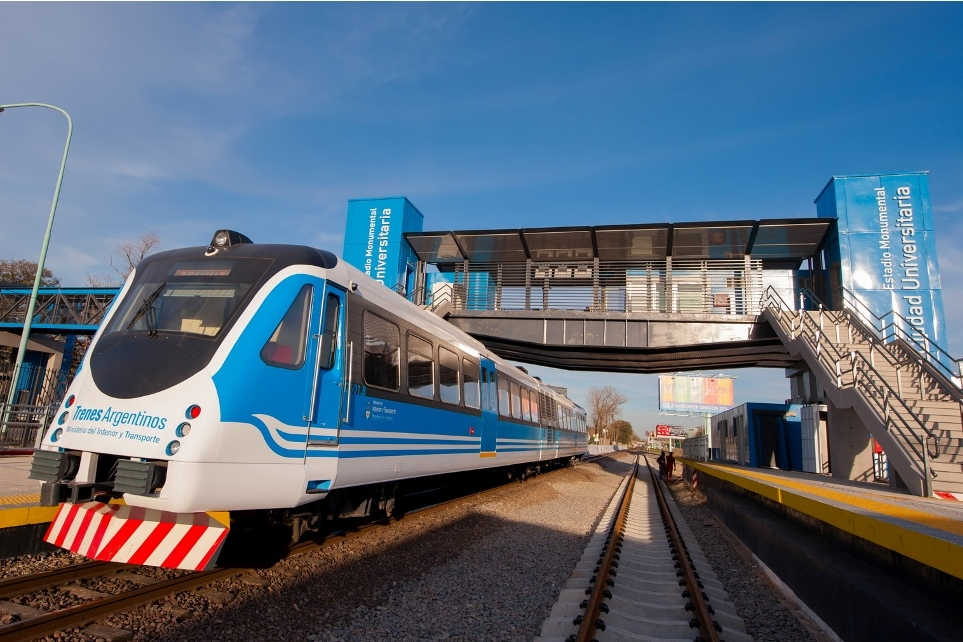
An Alerce stopped at Ciudad Universitaria station in the Belgrano neighbourhood (August 2015)

The narrow gauge variant of the Alerce is currently used for differential services on the Belgrano Norte Line commuter rail service in Buenos Aires. The service stops at Retiro Belgrano railway station, the University of Buenos Aires' Ciudad Universitaria campus, Aristóbulo del Valle and Del Viso with prices ranging from AR$ 1.50-17 with a SUBE card and AR$3–34 without a SUBE card. The journey time between Retiro and Del Viso is 65 minutes. Unlike the rest of the line operated by Ferrovías, the service is operated by the state-owned Trenes Argentinos. The service was also going to have a stop at Aeroparque Jorge Newbery airport, however this station was cancelled with the Ministry of the Interior and Transport citing the station causing a possible increase in security concerns at the airport as the reason for its cancellation.

The broad gauge variant of the Alerce will be used on the General Roca Railway between Constitución railway station and Dolores on a rural service which will stop at all stations between the two termini.

In April 2018, Emepa provided the two last Alerce vehicles (from a total of 20) that had been commissioned to be used in the regional services Tren de las Sierras (Córdoba Province) and Salta – Gral. Güemes (Salta Province). In 2020, two coaches else commissioned to Emepa were added to the Salta Service.

== See also ==
- Materfer CMM 400-2 - another Argentine-built DMU
- Trenes Argentinos - primary operator
- Belgrano Norte Line
- Tren de las Sierras
