= Subtepass =

Electronic smartcard used on the Buenos Aires Metro

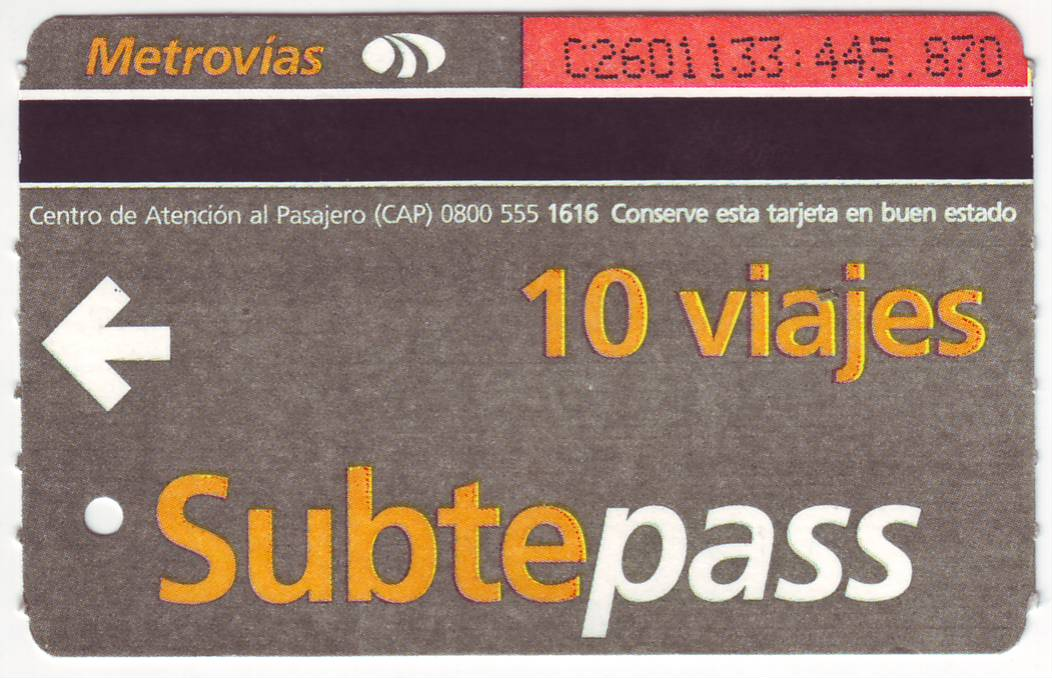
Subtepass 10 trip Card

Subtepass is the electronic smartcard used for trips on the Buenos Aires Metro. In addition to the regular Subtepass, there are special discounted and free versions available, based on category. Secondary and tertiary school students may purchase a discounted Abono Estudiantil (Spanish: Student Pass). Teachers that are employed by the city school system may purchase a discounted Abono Maestro (Spanish: Teacher Pass). Students in primary school may ride the metro to and from school for free with a Pase Escolar Primario (Spanish: Primary School Pass), provided they are wearing their white smock uniform. In addition, retirees, pensioners, and certain classes of retired military personnel are eligible for a free Pase Jubilados y Pensionados (Spanish: Retiree and Pensioner Pass). There are also free passes for visually impaired and disabled persons.

In more recent years, the contactless SUBE and Monedero smart cards have been favoured over the Subtepass.
