= Emepa Group =

Argentine rolling stock manufacturer

Grupo Emepa
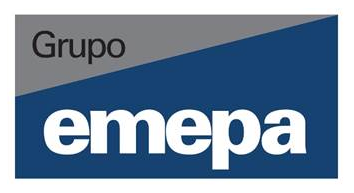
- Company type: S.A.
- Industry: Civil Engineering; Transport; Metallurgy
- Headquarters: Avenida Corrientes, Buenos Aires, Argentina
- Products: Diesel locomotives Diesel railcars
- Services: Railway engineering Construction
- Owner: Gabriel Romero
- Number of employees: 10,000
- Subsidiaries: Emepa; Ferrovías; Ferrocentral (defunct); Argentren (defunct)
- Website: grupoemepa.com.ar

Emepa Group S.A. (Spanish: Grupo Emepa, an acronym for Empresa Metalúrgica Patricias Argentinas) is an Argentine conglomerate (company) that operates in several transport and engineering areas.

The company owns a large amount of companies such as Ferrovías (which operates on the Belgrano Norte Line), with headquarters located in the city of Buenos Aires. It had formerly owned Ferrocentral, which ran services from Buenos Aires to Córdoba and San Miguel de Tucumán on the Mitre Network, however the state-owned company SOFSE took over these services in 2014 and the subsidiary now remains inactive.

Emepa has also manufacturered railway vehicles such as the Alerce diesel railcars.

== Overview ==
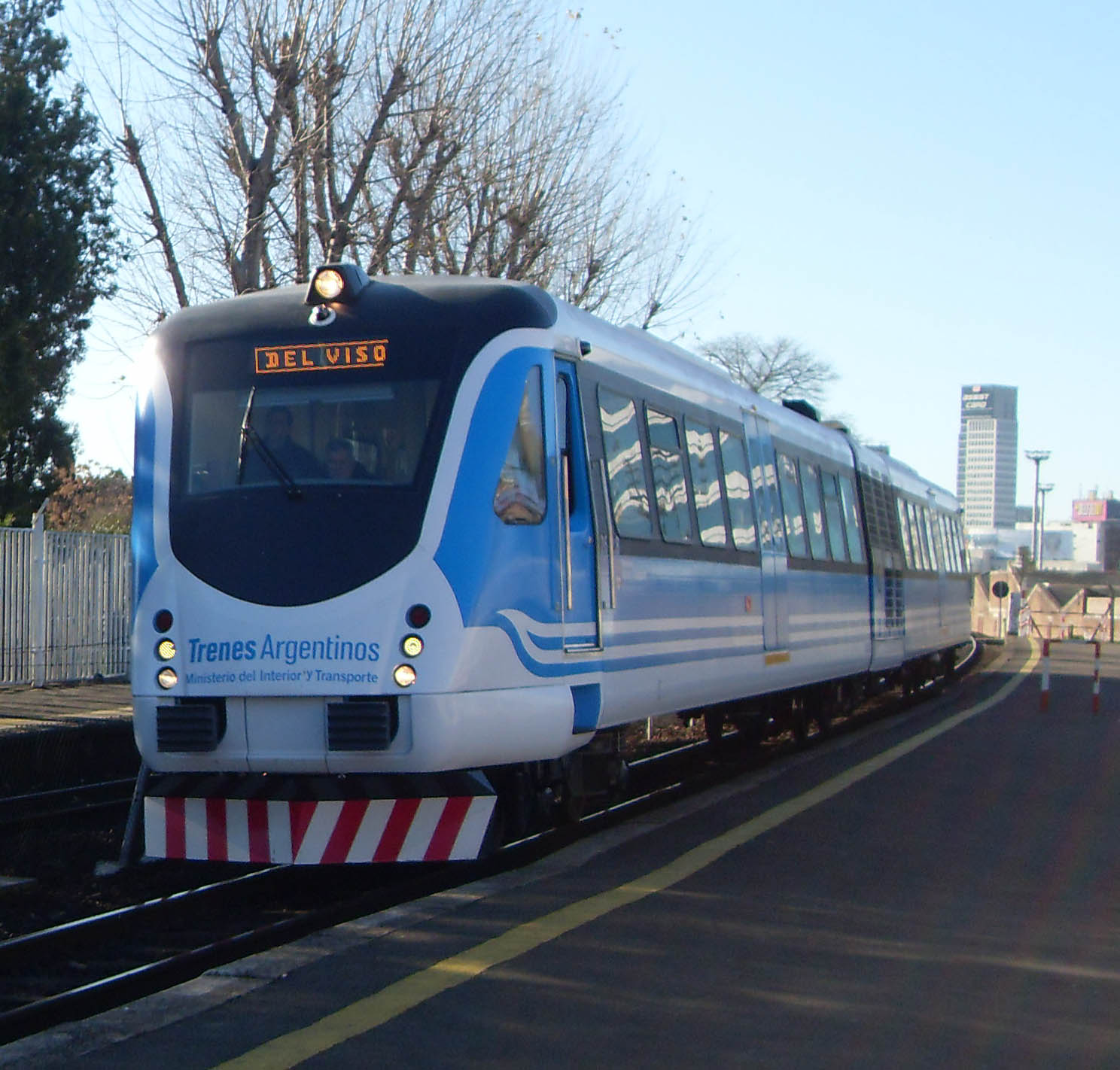
Emepa Alerce diesel multiple units were introduced in 2015 to serve the Belgrano Norte line

Emepa currently produces Alerce trains at the company's workshop in Chascomús. Current models are diesel multiple units which are being phased into the Belgrano Norte Line in Greater Buenos Aires with 20 two-carriage trains on order, however electric models will be made available in the future for other lines. The trains are made using 90% of the raw materials needed from Argentina and have a capacity for 240 people. In June 2015 it was announced that Emepa would produce a broad gauge variant of the Alerce for use on local service on the General Roca Railway.

Over the years the company has also restored and refurbished older rolling stock in Argentina, particularly for the Buenos Aires Underground. Some examples include modernised versions of the La Brugeoise cars and modernised versions of the Siemens-Schuckert Orenstein & Koppel rolling stock with Alstom.

The group owned both Ferrovías and Ferrocentral. Ferrovías still operates the Belgrano Norte Line, while Ferrocentral formerly operated services from Buenos Aires to Rosario, Córdoba and Tucumán as well as the Tren de las Sierras in Córdoba Province - services which were gradually taken over by Trenes Argentinos (SOFSE) in 2014 and 2015. The company had also owned Argentren, which operated the Roca and Belgrano Sur lines until they were also re-nationalised by the government in 2014.

Through Ferrovías, the company also operates the Lima Metro.

In the 1990s, Emepa (associated with Belgian company Jan de Nul) granted a concession to operate the Paraguay-Paraná Waterway.

== Current companies ==
Company	Sector	Operating area
Emepa	Railway infrastructure, Metallurgy	Argentina
Línea 1	Rail transport operation	Lima, Peru
Ferrovías	Rail transport operation	Buenos Aires Province
Herso	Railway engineering	Argentina
Ferromel	Railway engineering	Argentina

== Gallery ==
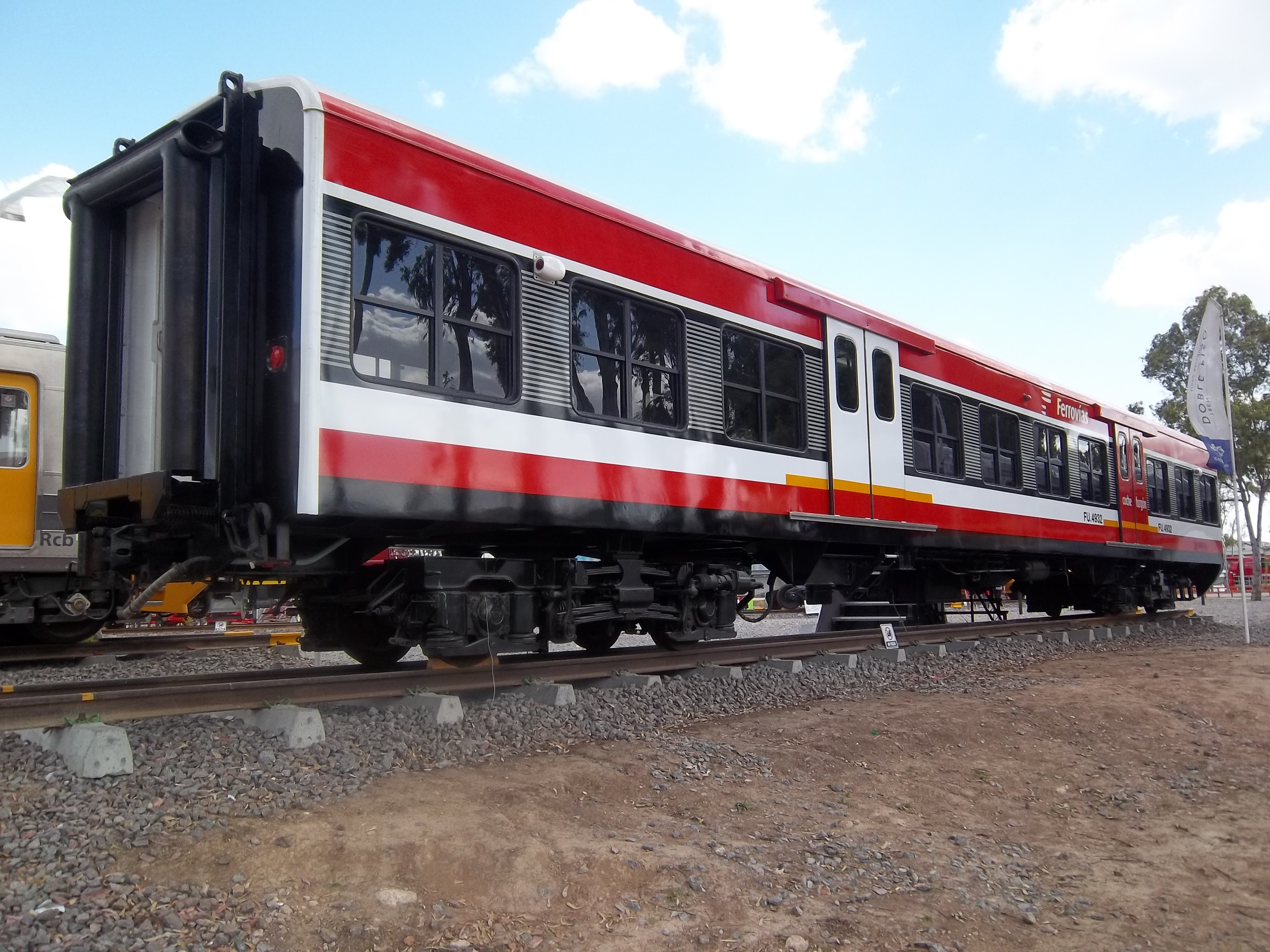
Coach produced for Belgrano Norte Line

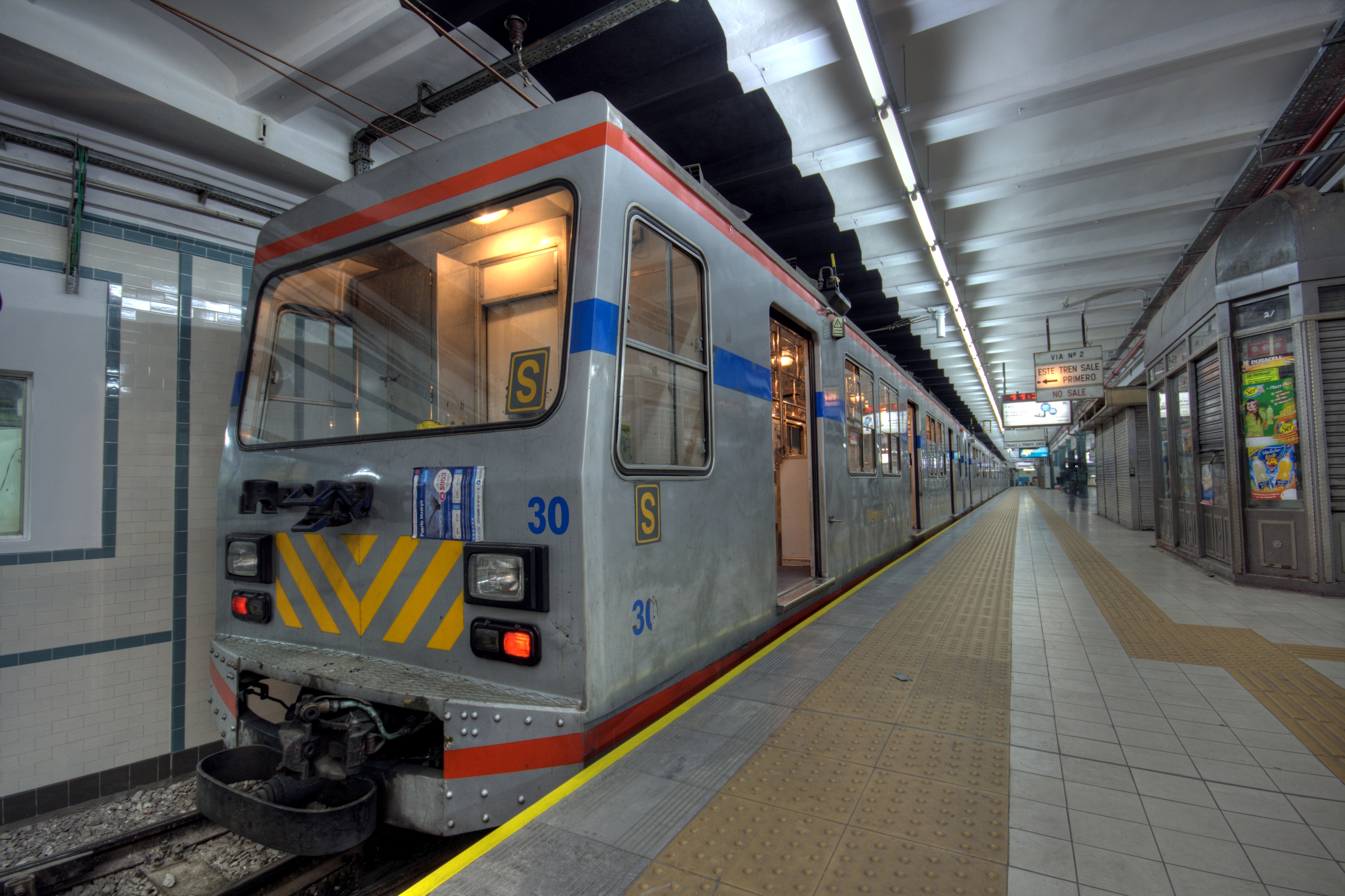
EMEPA-La Brugeoise underground coach

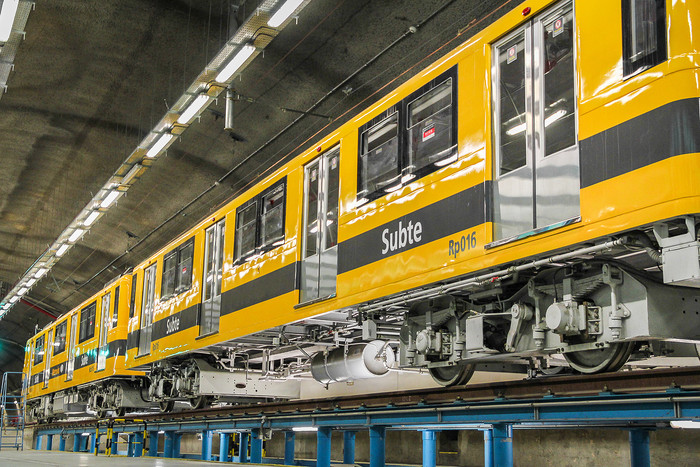
A Siemens-Schuckert Orenstein & Koppel reformed by Emepa for the Buenos Aires Underground

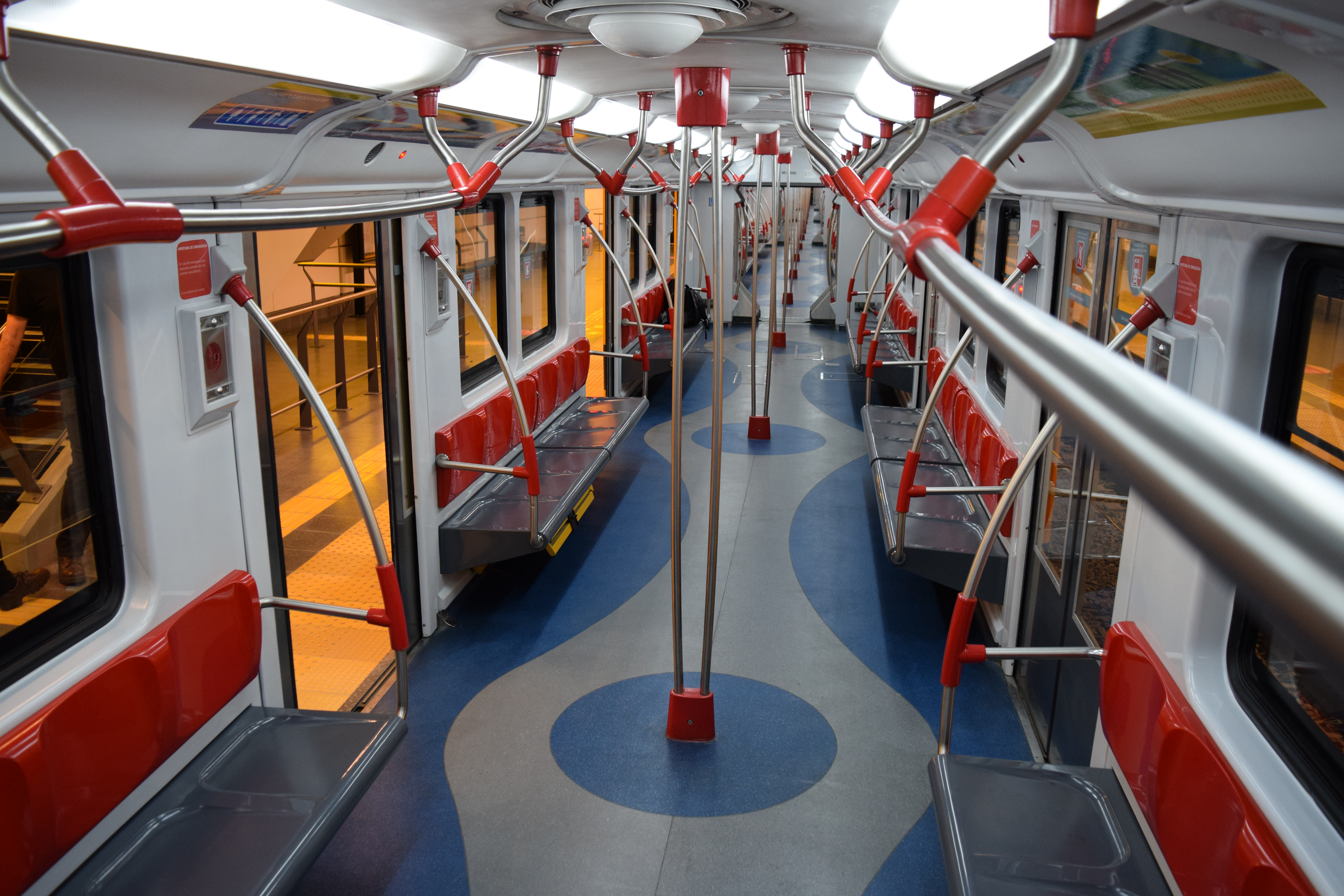
Interior of the Siemens-Emepa car

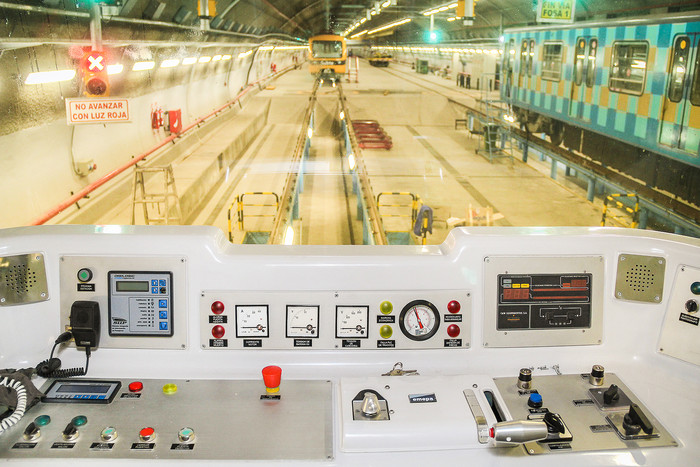
Siemens interior, company logo can be seen on dashboard

== See also ==
- Emepa Alerce
- Buenos Aires Underground rolling stock
- Materfer
- Rail transport in Argentina
