= Ciudad Universitaria railway station =

Railway station in Buenos Aires, Argentina

Ciudad Universitaria
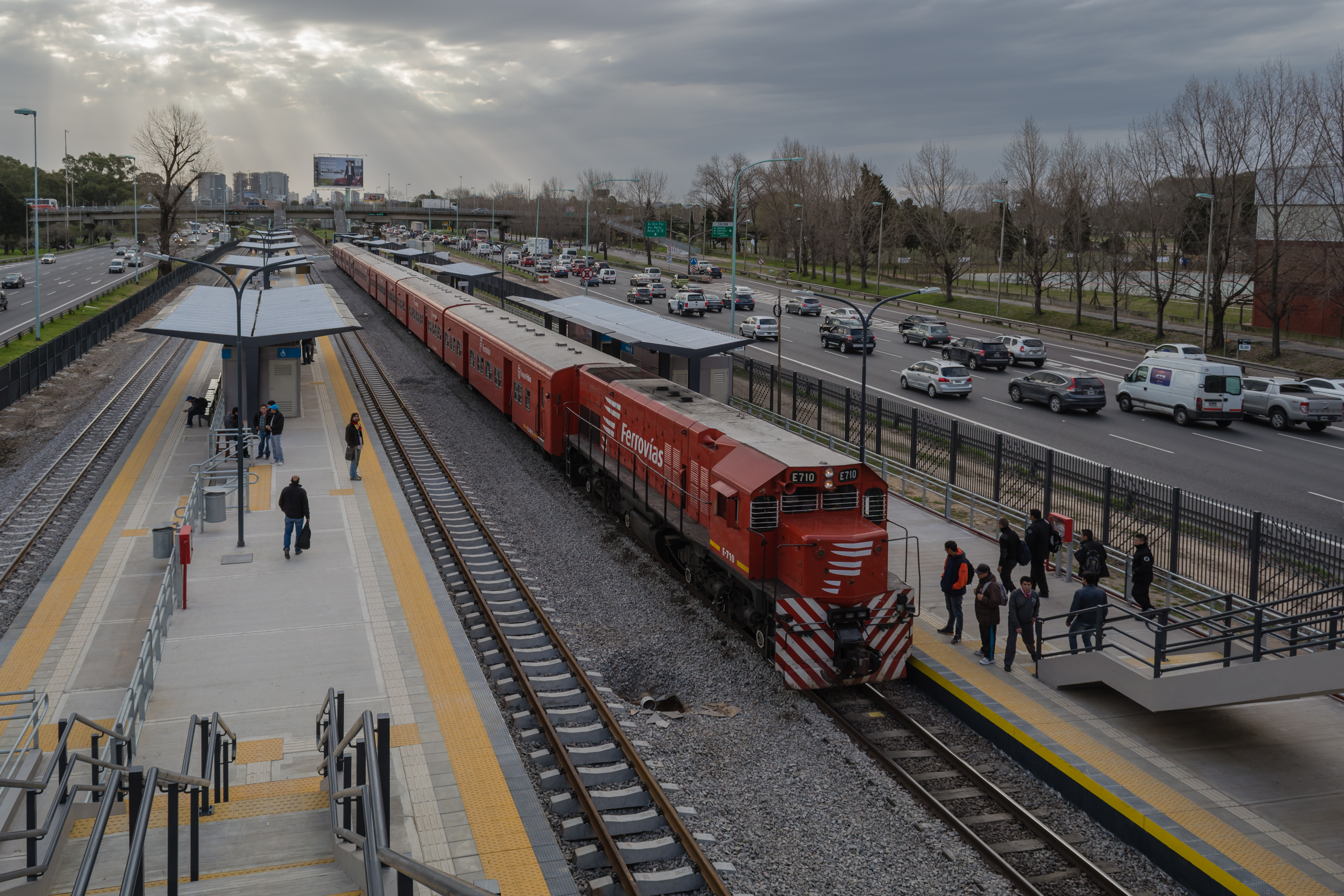
- A local train bound for Retiro.

General information
- Location: Lugones/Cantilo Ave. and Udaondo; Belgrano, Buenos Aires; Argentina
- Coordinates: 34.5426°S 58.4484°W
- System: Commuter rail
- Owner: Government of Argentina
- Operator: Ferrovías (standard service); Trenes Argentinos (differential)
- Line: Belgrano Norte Line
- Platforms: 2
- Tracks: 2
- Connections: Ciudad Universitaria UBA; Estadio Monumental

History
- Opened: August 29, 2015; 10 years ago
Location

Ciudad Universitaria is a railway station located in Belgrano, Buenos Aires. The station is part of Belgrano Norte Line and currently operated by both companies, private Ferrovías (for regular services) and state-owned Trenes Argentinos (for differential services only, served by Emepa Alerce DMUs).

The station is named for the Ciudad Universitaria campus of the University of Buenos Aires, which lies adjacent to the station and is served by it.

== History ==
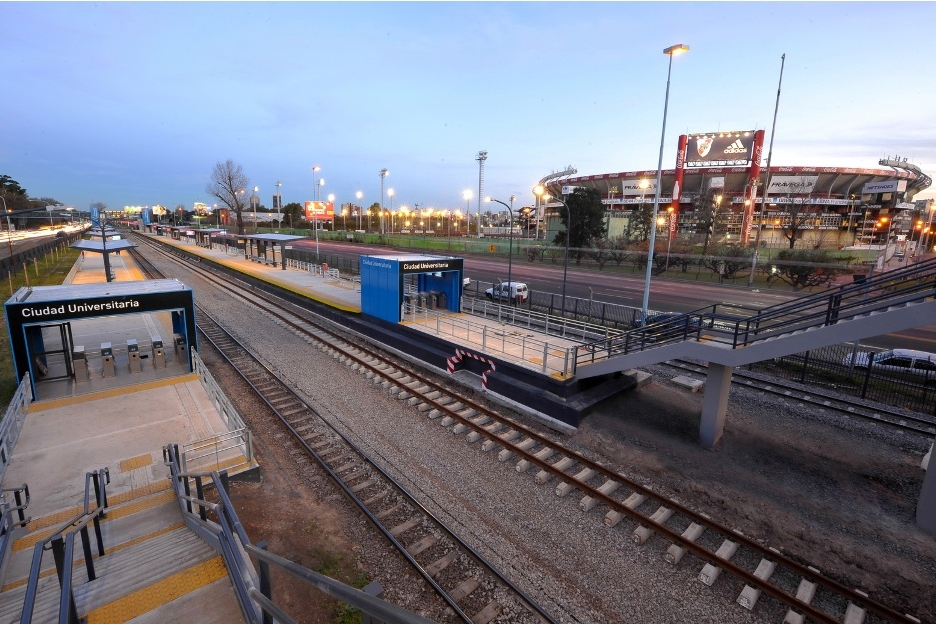
Ciudad Universitaria Station & River Plate stadium

In 1994 private company Ferrovías took the concession of Belgrano Norte as part of the privatisation process carried out by President Carlos Menem.

In 2014 the Government of Argentina began building the "Ciudad Universitaria" station. The new station, opened in August 2015, replaced Scalabrini Ortiz (located 700 metres to the south of it). Ciudad Universitaria connects the University of Buenos Aires's campus (known as "Ciudad Universitaria" from which it took its name) through a bridge which allows students to reach university facilities without risk of traffic accidents.

Although it had been announced that the station would be completed in March 2015 at a cost of AR$48 million, by June 2015 it had not been completed yet according to the Ministry of Transport. Finally, the station was opened at the end of August 2015, to serve the 40,000 people that attend the UBA campus each day.
