= Adelina Munro Drysdale =

Argentine socialite and Italian aristocrat (1896–1942)

Princess Adelina
- Duchess of Rignano
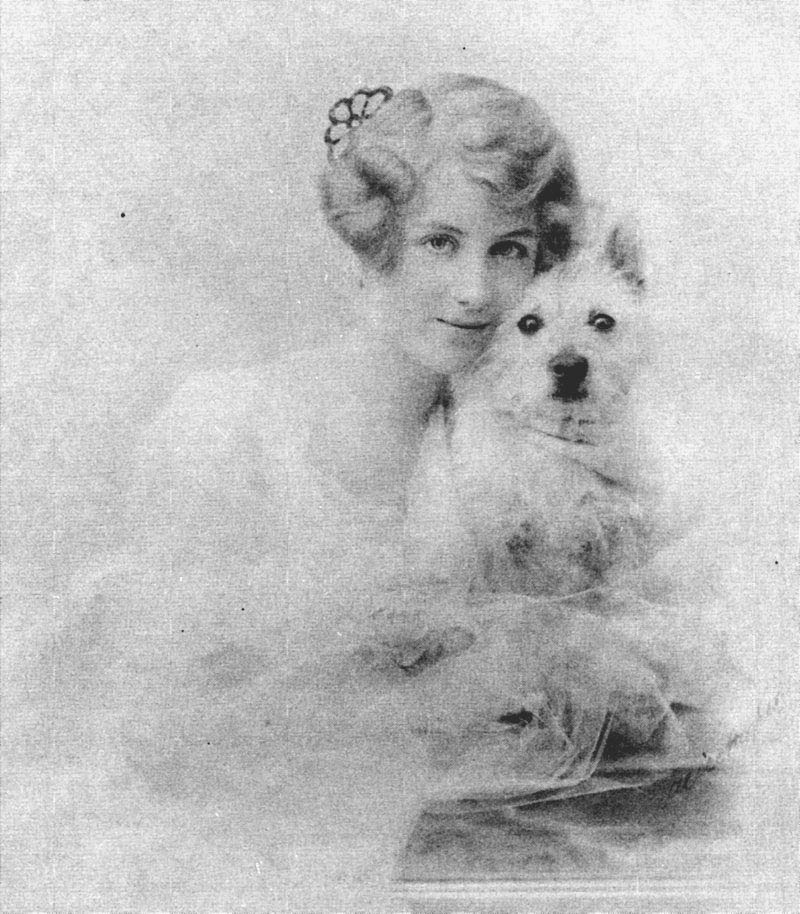
- Drysdale in 1917
- Born: Adelina Munro Drysdale; 19 September 1896; Buenos Aires, Argentina
- Died: 14 December 1942 (aged 46); Rome, Italy
- Noble family: Colonna (by marriage)
- Spouses: Prince Mario de Colonna, Duke of Rignano (m. 1917)
- Issue: María Vittoria, Oddone, Fabio, Stefano, Livia
- Father: Thomas James Drysdale
- Mother: Elisabeth Mary Munro
- Occupation: socialite

Princess Adelina de Colonna, Duchess of Rignano (born Adelina Munro Drysdale; 19 September 1896 – 14 December 1942) was a Scottish Argentine socialite. In her honour, her grandfather Duncan MacKay Munro named the Villa Adelina train station of Córdoba Central Railway (current General Belgrano Railway) after her. The town then built around the station in Vicente López Partido also took the name "Villa Adelina".

== Early life and family ==
Drysdale was born on 19 September 1896 in Buenos Aires to Thomas James Drysdale (1869–1897) and Elisabeth Mary Munro, a descendant of the Clan Munro. Her father, born in London, moved to Argentina after completing his education. Her paternal grandfather, Joseph Drysdale, was a prominent businessman who emigrated from Scotland to Argentina. Her maternal grandfather, Duncan Mackay Munro, was a Scottish industrialist who managed the Córdoba and Rosario Railway, Córdoba Central Railway, Argentine Northwest Railway and later served as the British Vice-Consul of Córdoba. Her grandfather had the town of Villa Adelina named after her. After her father died of typhoid in 1897, her mother remarried Count Francesco Bottaro Costa (1858–1936), an Italian nobleman and diplomat, in 1903. The family later moved to Europe due to Drysdale's stepfather's diplomatic appointments, settling in Rome. When Drysdale was eighteen years old she was presented at court to Queen Elena of Italy.

On 10 September 1917 Drysdale married Prince Mario de Colonna, Duke of Rignano in Paris. Her husband was the son of Prospero Colonna, Duke of Rignano, Prince of Sonnino, who served as the mayor of Rome. She and Prince Mario had five children:

- María Vittoria, born in Rome on 2 August 1918, wife of Francesco Mario Theodoli, of the family of San Vito.
- Oddone, born in Rome on 22 October 1919, Duke of Rignano (1938). Married to María Luisa Bergozzi in 1944.
- Fabio, born in Rome on 11 March 1921, married to Elisabetta Galletti in 1946.
- Stefano, born in Rome on 7 September 1924. Married to Diana Hierschel de Minerbi in 1967.
- Livia, born in Rome on 7 August 1932, wife of Paolo Cenci-Bolognetti, prince of Vicovaro .

Her husband died in an airplane crash in 1938. Drysdale died in Rome on 14 December 1942 after suffering from an illness.

Drysdale's biography, titled Adelina ... La Princesa, was written by Francisco Diurno in 1991.
