= Ferrovías =

Argentine private railway company

Ferrovías S.A.C.

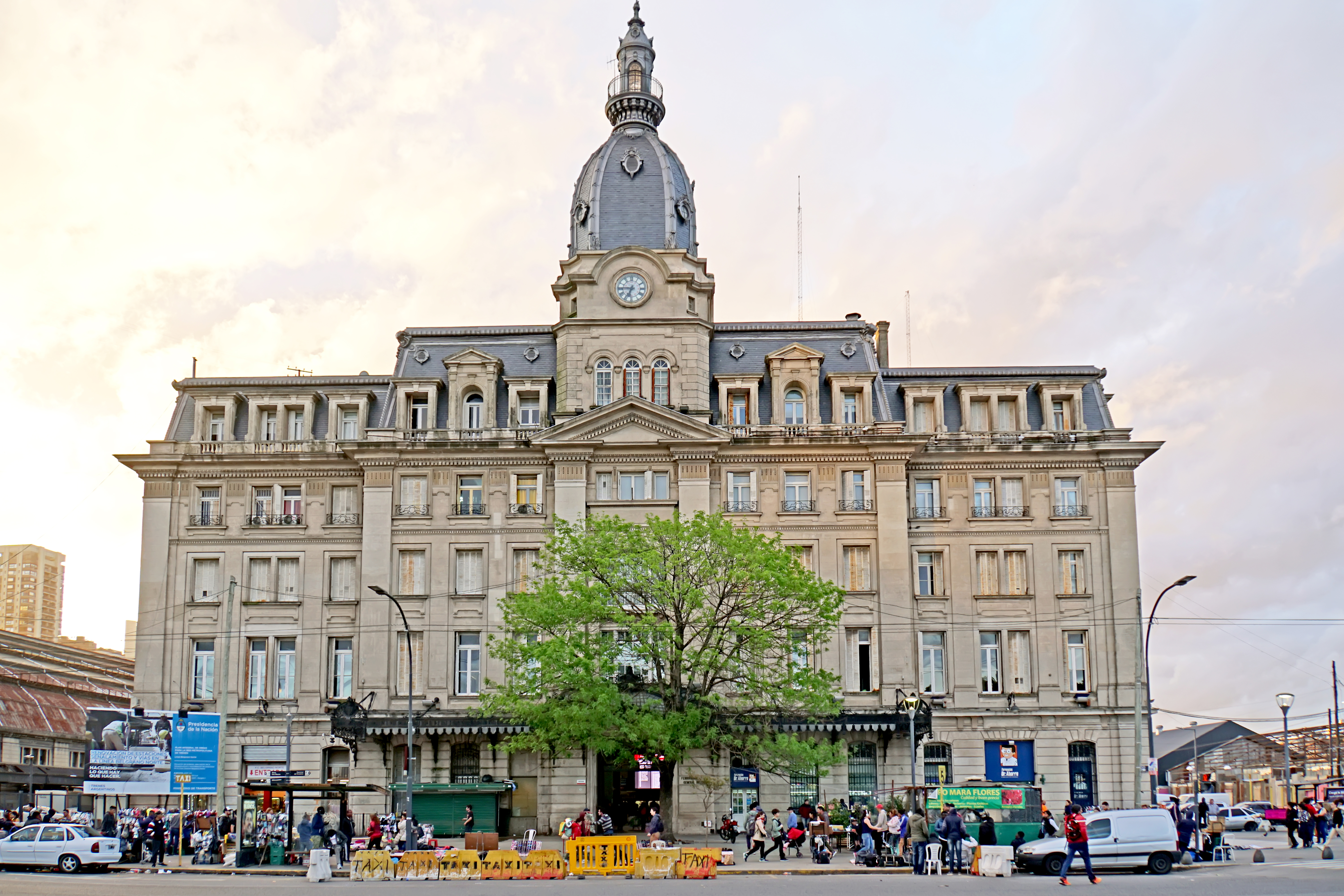
- Retiro (Belgrano Norte) station, Ferrovías headquarters
- Company type: Private
- Industry: Transport
- Predecessor: FEMESA
- Founded: 1994; 32 years ago
- Headquarters: Buenos Aires, Argentina
- Number of locations: 23 stations
- Area served: City of Buenos Aires; Greater Buenos Aires; Lima
- Services: Railway transport
- Parent: Grupo Emepa
- Divisions: Belgrano Norte Line; Lima Metro
- Website: Ferrovias.com.ar

Ferrovías S.A.C. is a privately owned company which, on 1 April 1994, took over the concession, granted by the Argentine government as part of railway privatisation during the presidency of Carlos Menem, for the operation of the 1,000 mm (3 ft 3 3/8 in) (metre gauge) Belgrano Norte Line commuter rail service in Buenos Aires, Argentina.

From 2004 to 2014 the company also formed part of UGOFE, a consortium with Metrovías and Trenes de Buenos Aires, which took over the running of commuter rail services on the Belgrano Sur, Roca and San Martín lines in Buenos Aires after concessions granted to Metropolitano S.A. for the operation of these services were revoked. UGOFE was dissolved in 2013.

Ferrovías operated the Puerto Madero Tramway, in the Puerto Madero district of Buenos Aires, from July 2007 until its closure in October 2012.

Outside of Argentina, the company also operates the Lima Metro in Peru.

== History ==
=== Background ===
By the end of the 1980s all the railway system in Argentina was privatized by the national government. The metropolitan services were privatized since March 1991. A new company – Ferrocarriles Metropolitanos S.A. (FEMESA) – was established to operate the suburban services until the railway lines were given in concession to their respective operators.

=== Ferrovías administration ===
On April 1, 1994, Ferrovías S.A.C. took over the Línea Belgrano Norte. During the first year of operation, the line carried 14,800,000 passengers.

The main plan of the concession were based on 3 objectives:

- To improve the infrastructure of track, bridges and level crossings and signal system and traffic control in all the stations of the line.
- The maintenance of locomotives and coaches in good conditions.
- To reduce travel time between head stations (Retiro and Villa Rosa), increasing also the number of coaches.

Due to the investments, the number of passengers carried increased to 36 million during 1999 and 2000. In 2008 it was increased to 45,830,200 passengers.

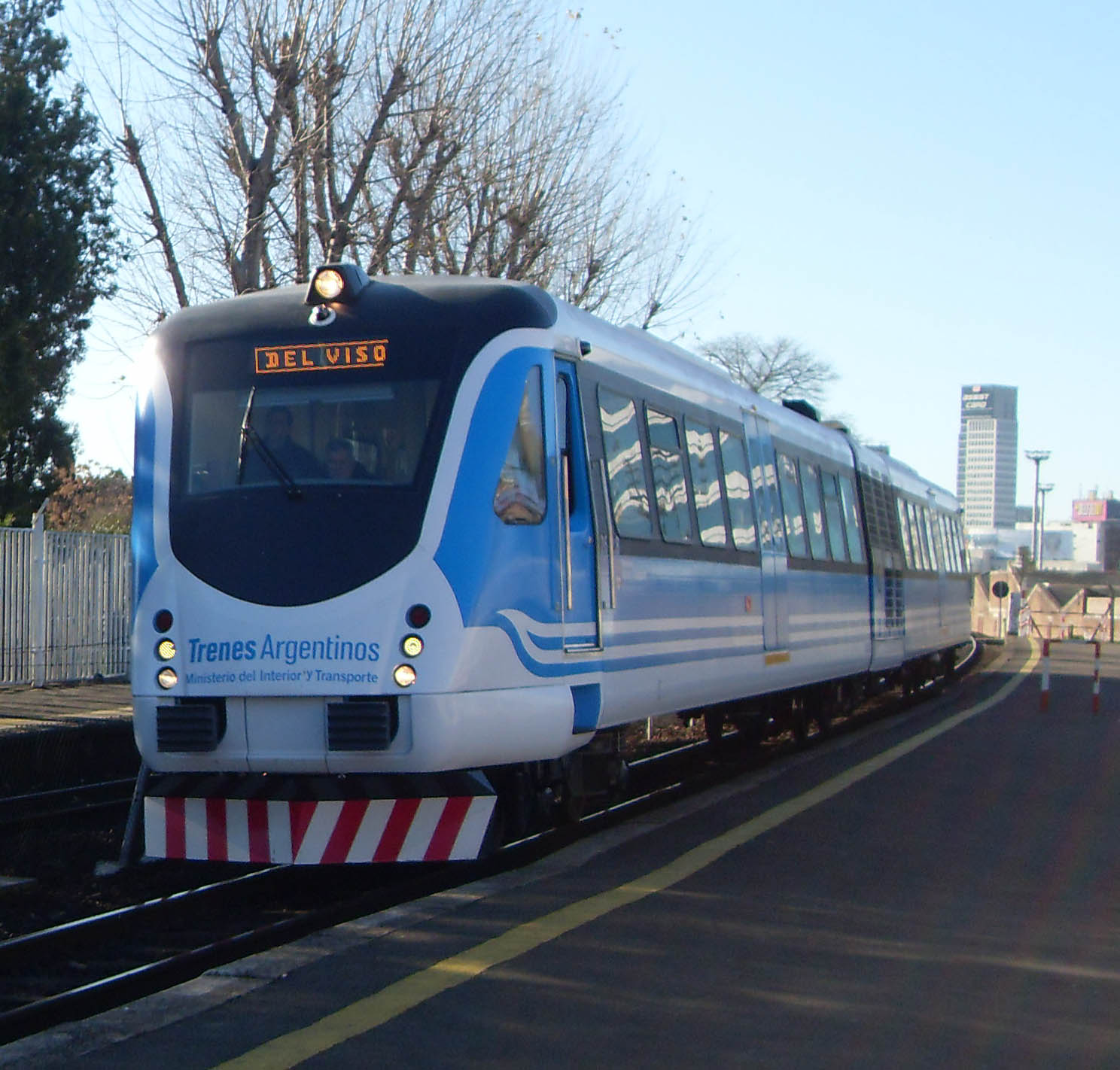
Emepa Alerce railcars were introduced in 2015 to run express services

The General Auditing Office released a report indicating that the subsidies given by the State to Ferrovías were misappropriated to other companies of the holding which received them as "loans". In 2011 Ferrovías received subsidies for a total of A$ 368,3 million.

In addition to the remodeling of the stations, this comprehensive renovation includes improvements to the tracks and signage in the station area, which will allow improvements in train circulation. The works were awarded in November 2017 and at the end of March 2018 the works began.

In 2015, Ferrovías introduced the Alerce, a railcar manufactured by the Emepa Group that ran trains from Boulogne Sur Mer to Retiro. Each train had a capacity for 240 passengers and featured intelligent doors, air conditioning, security cameras, disabled access and Wi-Fi.
