= Villa Adelina =

- District
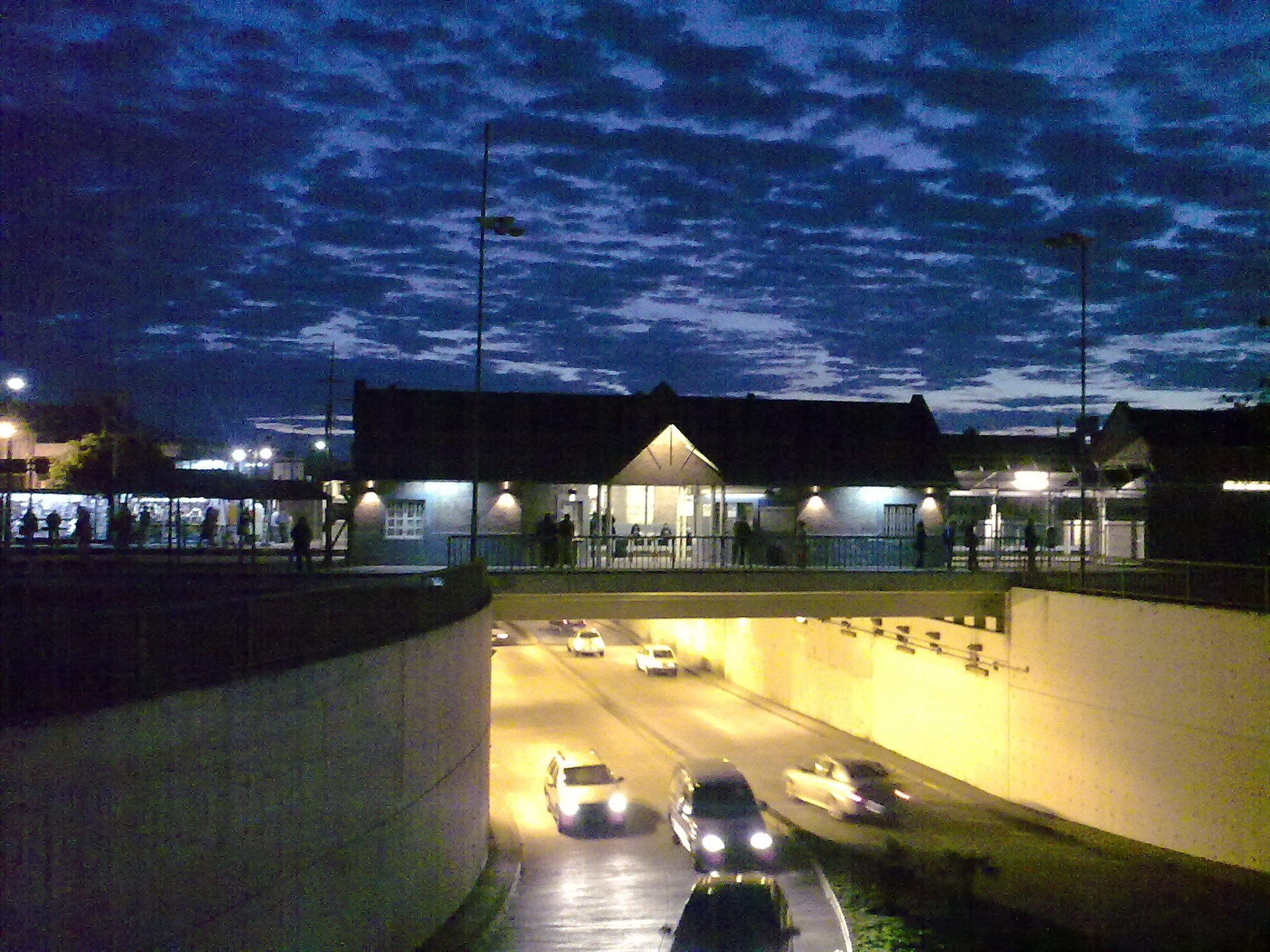
- May Avenue, Villa Adelina.

- Location in Greater Buenos Aires
- Coordinates: 34°31′S 58°32′W
- Country: Argentina
- Province: Buenos Aires
- Partido: San Isidro; Vicente López
- Founded: 1909
- Named for: Adelina Munro Drysdale
- Elevation: 26 m (85 ft)

Population (2001 census [INDEC])
  - Total: 44,587
- CPA Base: B 1607 / B 1605
- Area code: +54 11

Villa Adelina is a city in Buenos Aires Province, Argentina. It is divided between the counties (partidos) of San Isidro and Vicente López and forms part of the urban conurbation of Greater Buenos Aires. The town is named after Adelina Munro Drysdale, whose grandfather was a British railway official in Argentina.

== Education ==
The area once had a German school, Deutsche Schule Villa Adelina.
