= Boulogne Sur Mer =

- Town
- Location in Greater Buenos Aires
- Coordinates: 34°30′S 58°34′W
- Country: Argentina
- Province: Buenos Aires
- Partido: San Isidro
- Elevation: 16 m (52 ft)

Population (2001 census [INDEC])
  - Total: 73,496
- CPA Base: B 1643
- Area code: +54 11

Boulogne Sur Mer is a town in Buenos Aires Province, Argentina. It is in San Isidro Partido and forms part of the Greater Buenos Aires urban conurbation, 26 km (16,25 mi) north of Buenos Aires. It has a population of 89,046 (2001 INDEC census). The town is named after the city of Boulogne-sur-Mer in northern France, where the Argentine general José de San Martín died in 1850.

== Transport ==
By rail, the town in served by the narrow gauge Belgrano Norte Line, which has both regular and differential services. National Route 9 also passes through the town, giving direct access to the city of Buenos Aires and to provinces to the west.

== Education ==
Goethe-Schule Buenos Aires, a German school, is in Boulogne.
