= SUBE card =

Card system for public transport in Argentina

SUBE Card
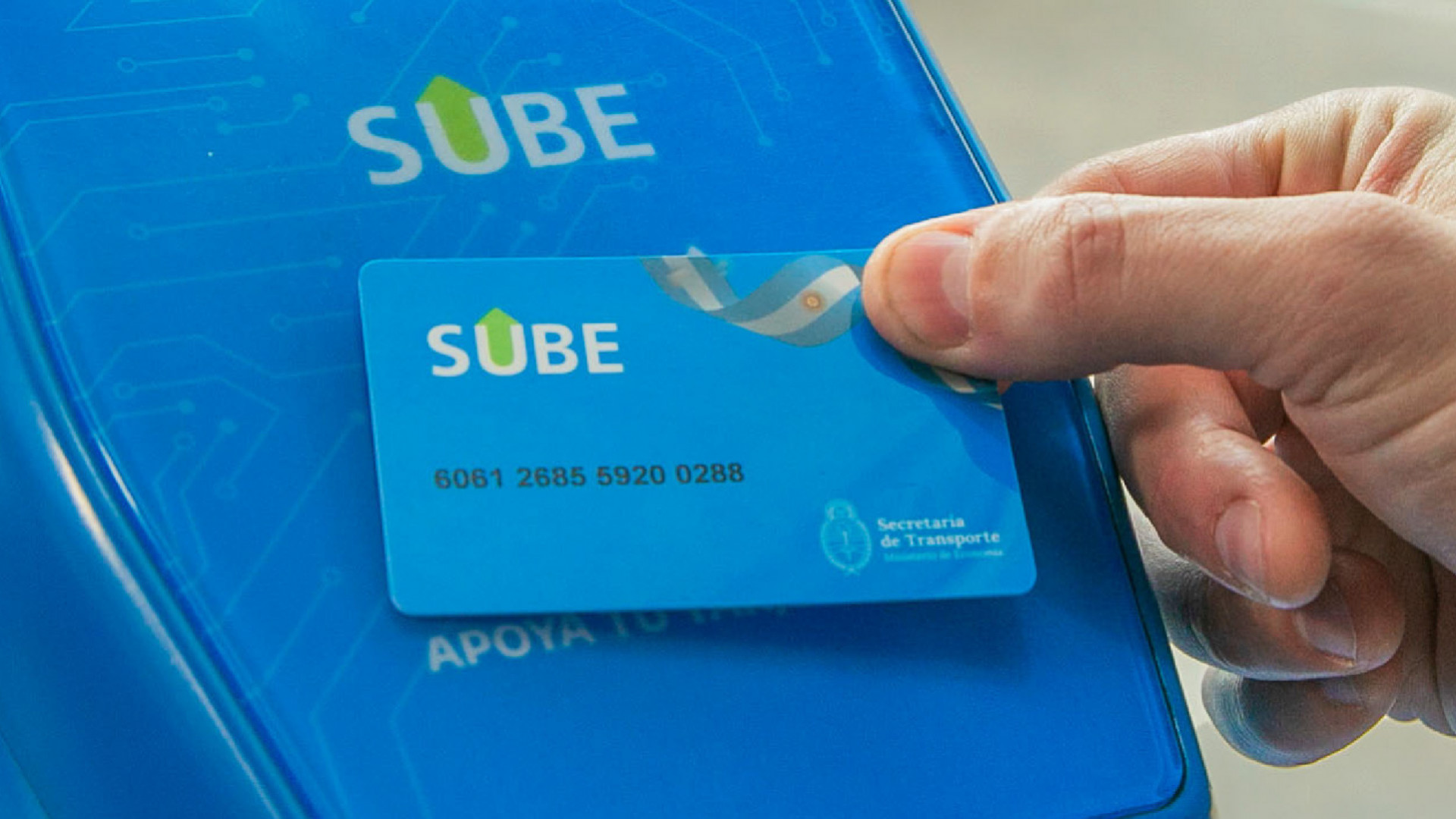
- Location: Argentina
- Launched: February 2009; 17 years ago
- Technology: Contactless smart card (MIFARE)
- Operator: Nación Servicios S.A
- Currency: ARS
- Credit expiry: None
- Validity: Colectivos (all lines); Metropolitan trains; Subte
- Retailed: Online; Telephone; Stations
- Variants: Monedero card
- Website: argentina.gob.ar/sube

The Sistema Único de Boleto Electrónico (Unique Electronic Ticket System, mostly known for its acronym SUBE) is a contactless smart card system introduced in Argentina in February 2009. It is used on public transport services within the Buenos Aires metropolitan area and other Argentine cities and was promoted by the Argentine Secretary of Transportation. It is valid on a number of different travel systems across the city including the Underground, buses and trains.

One of the benefits of this change is that it has helped speed passengers onto the bus, as people no longer had to wait to be issued a printed receipt as they each enter the bus. Environmentally this helps reduce emissions of carbon dioxide and nitrogen because buses don't have to stay idle as long while passengers load, helping improve air quality in the city. The electronic ticket also eliminated the need for printed receipts, thus lowering the amount of littering in the city. The city, in turn, no longer has to process, collect, count, and transport coinage received in payment of over 11 million trips per day.

== Background ==
Buenos Aires was affected for several years by an acute coin shortage that impacted the economy, banking, and transportation. Coins are still rationed by banks, and a thriving black market has been hoarding to sell coins illegally to retailers. Merchants have been rounding prices up or down according to the amount of change a customer actually has, or bartering, and making up the difference with a menial item. The fact that the vast majority of users need to purchase ahead sufficient credit for tickets and passes including highways tolls even for a complete month makes the SUBE card system carry a float of several million pesos which allows for financial backing of various activities at local government level and also, it took too much time for the customers to pay with coins in a rushing city with millions of people. The system is administered by Banco de la Nacion Argentina.

== Use ==
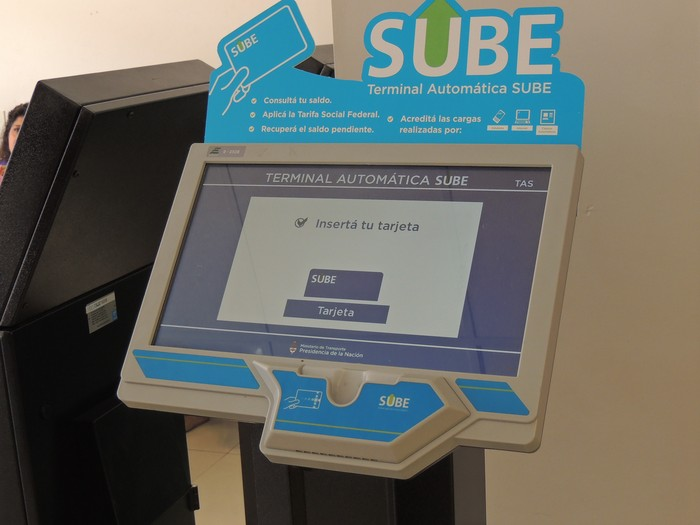
SUBE terminal, used to update credit charges

The SUBE card can be used on several transports method, including Greater Buenos Aires area Buses, Trains, Buenos Aires Metro, and several toll roads. Furthermore, the system has expanded to the major cities of Argentina: among others Mar del Plata, Villa Gesell, La Costa Partido, Pinamar, Bahía Blanca, Corrientes, Neuquén, Río Grande, Ushuaia, Formosa, San Salvador de Jujuy, Paraná and Santa Fe,

=== Bus ===
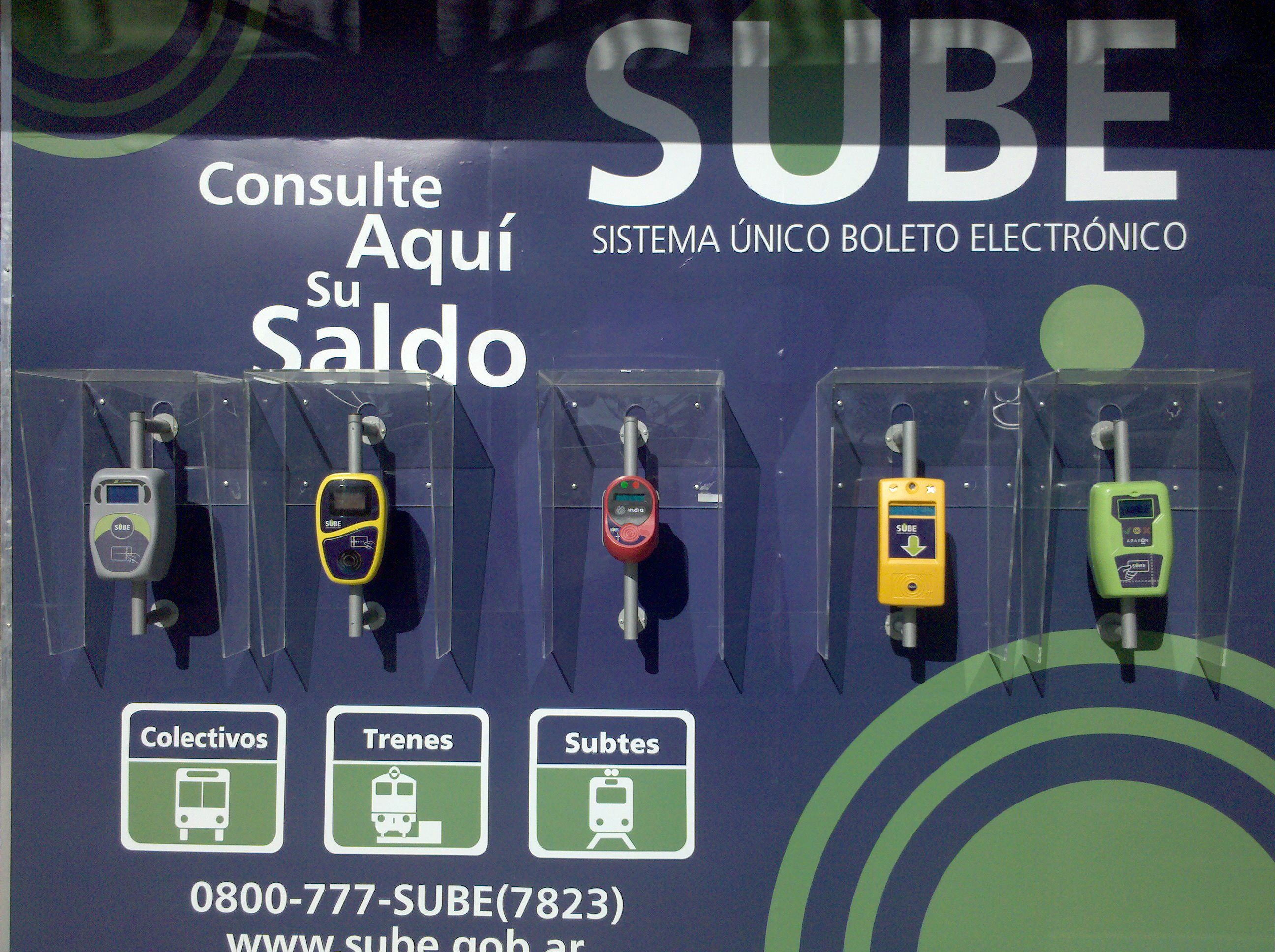
SUBE Certified ticket validator for buses

According to official SUBE website it can be used in all national, province and municipal buses lines within Greater Buenos Aires Area. Here is the full list:

==== National Lines ====
1, 2, 4, 5, 6, 7, 8, 9, 10, 12, 15, 17, 19, 20, 21, 22, 23, 24, 25, 26, 28, 29, 32, 33, 34, 37, 39, 41, 42, 44, 45, 46, 47, 49, 50, 51, 53, 55, 56, 57, 59, 60, 61, 62, 63, 64, 65, 67, 68, 70, 71, 74, 75, 76, 78, 79, 80, 84, 85, 86, 87, 88, 91, 92, 93, 95, 96, 97, 98, 99, 100, 101, 102, 103, 104, 105, 106, 107, 108, 109, 110, 111, 112, 113, 114, 115, 117, 118, 123, 124, 126, 127, 128, 129, 130, 132, 133, 134, 135, 136, 140, 143, 146, 148, 150, 151, 152, 153, 154, 158, 159, 160, 161, 163, 165, 166, 168, 169, 172, 174, 175, 176, 177, 178, 179, 180, 181, 182, 184, 185, 188, 193, 194, 195.

==== Province Lines ====
200, 202, 203, 204, 205, 214, 215, 218, 219, 222, 228, 236, 237, 238, 239, 242, 243, 245, 247, 252, 253, 256, 257, 263, 264, 266, 269, 271, 273, 275, 276, 277, 278, 281, 283, 284, 288, 289, 291, 293, 295, 297, 298, 299, 300, 304, 306, 307, 310, 311, 312, 313, 314, 315, 317, 318, 321, 322, 323, 324, 325, 326, 327, 328, 329, 333, 336, 338, 340, 341, 343, 350, 354, 355, 364, 365, 370, 371, 372, 373, 378, 379, 382, 383, 384, 385, 388, 391, 392, 394, 395, 403, 404, 405, 406, 407, 410, 418, 421, 422, 429, 430, 432, 435, 436, 437, 440, 441, 443, 445, 446, 448, 44.

==== Municipal Lines ====
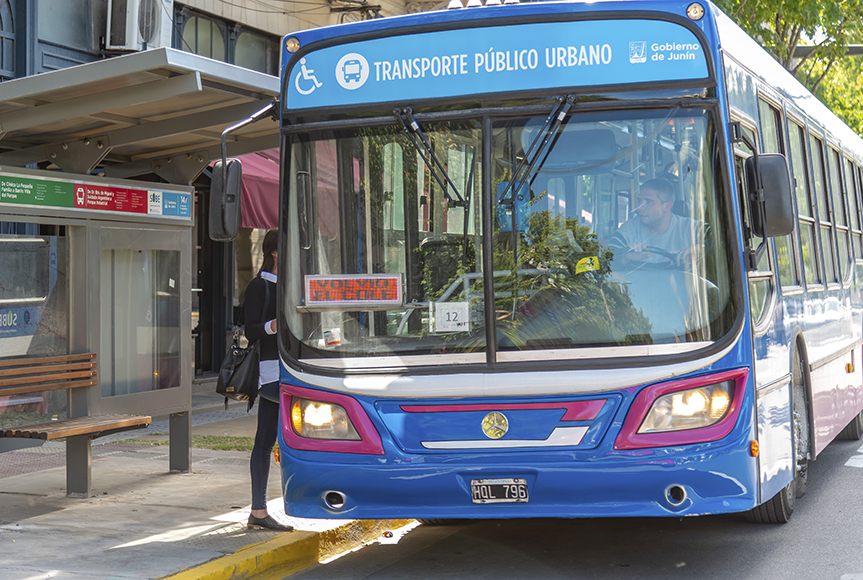
Urban bus at a stop in Junín

- Almirante Brown: 501(A), 505, 506(C), 510(A), 514, 515 and 521(B).
- Avellaneda: 570.
- Berazategui: 603 and 619.
- Brandsen: 500(B).
- Campana: 505(A).
- Cañuelas: 502.
- Escobar: 503(B), 505(A), 506(B), 507(B), 508(A), 511(A) and 513(A).
- Esteban Echeverría: 501(C).
- Ezeiza: 518.
- Florencio Varela: 500(F), 501(E), 502(C), 503(D), 504(C), 505(B/C), 506(D), 507, 508(B), 509(B), 510(C), 511(C), 512(C) and 513(B).
- General Rodríguez: 500(A).
- General San Martín: 670.
- José C. Paz: 741 and 749.
- Junín: Blue 1, Blue 2, Red and Green lines.
- La Matanza: 620, 621, 622, 624, 628 and 630.
- La Plata: East, West, North and South lines.
- Lanús: 520(B), 521(A), 522, 523, 524, 526 and 527.
- Lobos: 501(D) and 502(A).
- Lomas de Zamora: 532, 540, 541, 542, 543, 544, 548, 549, 550, 551, 552, 553, 561, 562 and 564.
- Luján: 500(C), 501(F), 502(B), 503(E).
- Mercedes: 1(B) and 2(B).
- Merlo: 500(D), 503(A) and 504(A).
- Moreno: 500(D), 501(G) and 503.
- Morón: 634, 635.
- Pilar: 501(B/I/H), 506(A), 510(B), 511(B), 520(A).
- Quilmes: 580, 582, 583, 584 and 585.
- San Fernando: 710.
- San Isidro: 707.
- San Miguel: 740.
- San Vicente: 503(C).
- Tigre: 720, 721, 722 and 723.
- Zárate: 500(E) and 503(F).

=== Buenos Aires Underground ===
All lines including:

- Line A
- Line B
- Line C
- Line D
- Line E
- Line H
- Premetro

=== Trains ===
All the following commuter rail lines:

- Belgrano Norte
- Belgrano Sur
- Mitre
- Roca
- San Martín
- Sarmiento
- Tren de la Costa
- Urquiza

=== Tolls roads ===
From the beginning of 2014, several tolls road could be paid by SUBE card:

- Autopistas del Oeste
- Autopistas del Sol

== Controversies ==
The project was led by Global Infrastructure (GI), owned by the British businessman Stephen Chandler. The Argentine newspaper La Nación noted that the fiscal address of GI was that of a local hairdresser, and their employees were not actually working for GI nor receiving the informed payments. The Secretary of Transport had also chosen Global Infrastructure despite being $10,000,000 more expensive than other offerings. La Nación also pointed out that GI did not exist before the tender. When all this info came to light, the contract with GI was cancelled.

== See also ==
- Transport in Argentina
