= 2013 Buenos Aires train crash =

Rail disaster in Argentina

Coordinates: 34.6086°S 58.4085°W

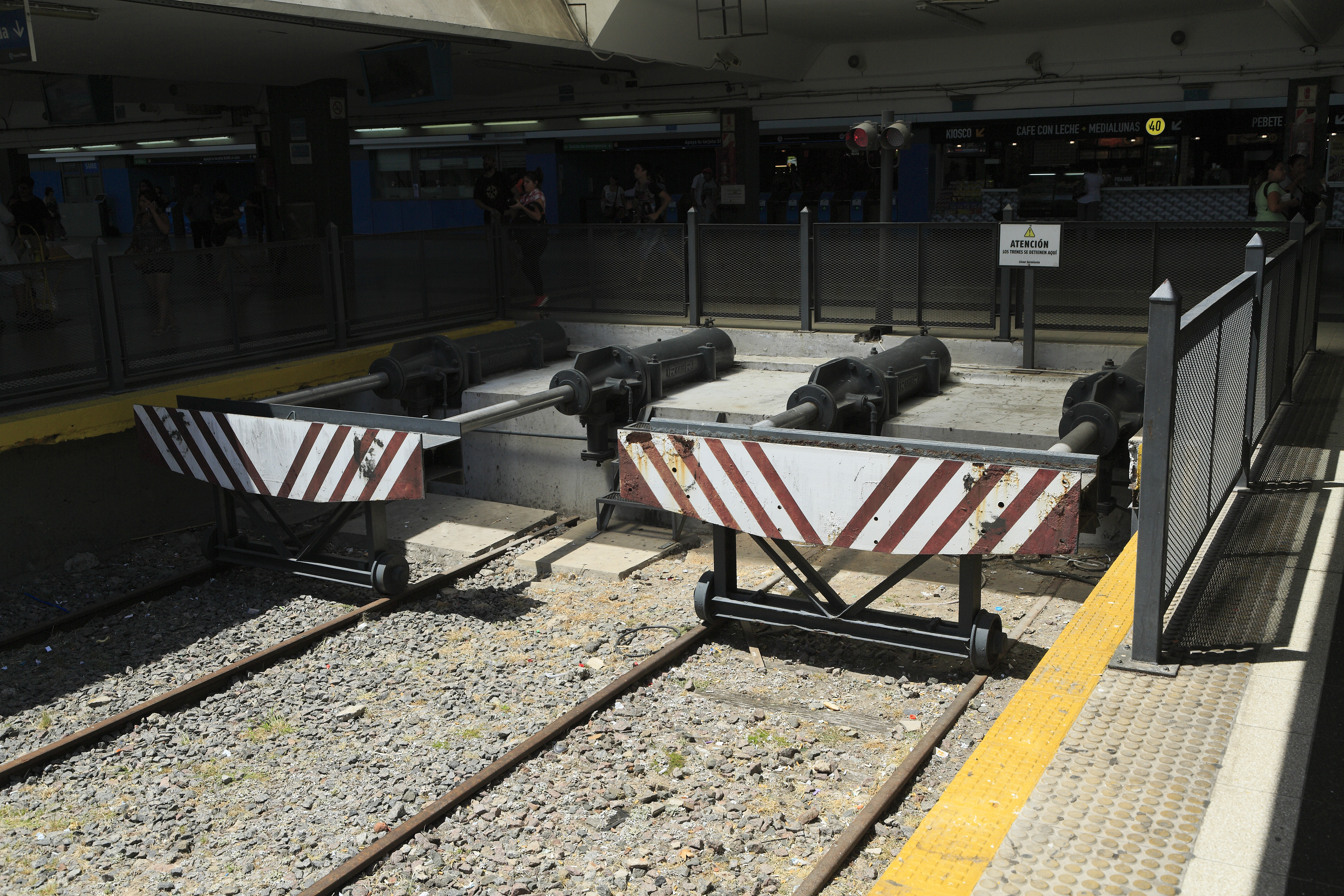
- Buffer stops of Once station, where the train collided

Details
- Date: October 19, 2013; 07:35 local time (10:35 UTC)
- Location: Once railway station, Buenos Aires
- Country: Argentina
- Line: Moreno–Once
- Operator: Unidad de Gestión Operativa Mitre Sarmiento
- Incident type: Collision with buffer stops
- Cause: Under investigation

Statistics
- Trains: 1
- Passengers: 1000
- Crew: 1
- Deaths: 0
- Injured: 105 (at least 5 serious)

The Buenos Aires train crash occurred on October 19, 2013 when a passenger train failed to stop at a terminal station in Buenos Aires, Argentina, injuring 105 people. The accident was caused by a human error.

== Antecedents ==
The Sarmiento Line had similar accidents in the previous months. The 2012 rail disaster took place on February 22, 2012, and caused 52 deaths and 700 injuries. The ensuing political scandal led to the demotion of Transportation Secretary Juan Pablo Schiavi, and a trial for the causes of the accident that is still open.

The line's private operator, TBA, had its concessions to operate the Mitre and Sarmiento lines revoked on May 24, 2012. Both lines were operated by the private consortium UGOMS at the time of the accident.

== Accident ==
At 07:35 local time (10:35 UTC), a passenger train failed to stop at Once Station in Buenos Aires, colliding with the buffer stop. The lead car jumped the retaining wall and landed on the platform. More than 99 people were reported injured, five seriously.

The driver, who was among the injured, was confronted by a number of passengers who called him a murderer. He was rescued by police and taken to hospital. The driver, Julio Benítez, was arrested after he was found with the train event recorder hidden in his backpack, with the police recovering the hard drive. Benítez had attempted to destroy the device.

A minor riot broke out outside the station, which was quelled by the police. A fleet of 30 ambulances and two helicopters took the injured to around a dozen different hospitals.

== Cause ==
No problems were reported on the train.

A witness claimed that the train had problems stopping at the two previous stations to Once; another one described a similar problem about Ciudadela station several miles to the west. Interior Minister Florencio Randazzo reported that the train entered Once Station at a speed of 22 kilometres per hour (14 mph) instead of the regulatory 12 kilometres per hour (7.5 mph). Randazzo also stated that, according to the GPS, the train stopped at all the stations without problems. He said that the unit had undergone general maintenance on October 15, and that the alcohol test on the motorman had a negative result. He pointed out as well that the motorman had not called to report any problem during the journey.

Several new trains were purchased in China a few months before, but the train that crashed was one of the older ones. At the time of the accident, the new trains were only used from Monday to Friday; the accident took place on Saturday.

== Political reactions ==
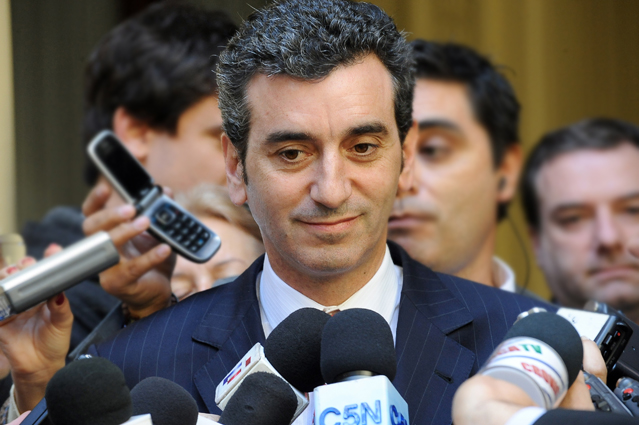
Florencio Randazzo headed the Ministry of Interior, which controlled rail transport in Argentina

Activist Luis D'Elía stated that the accident was the result of a conspiracy to undermine Front for Victory candidates in the mid-term legislative elections scheduled for October 27 (a week after the incident). He accused Congressman Fernando Solanas and the union leader Rubén Sobrero of being involved. D'Elía had said similar things about the Castelar rail accident, which took place in June along the same line. Minister of Interior Florencio Randazzo was asked about this, and did not dismiss any potential cause. The Secretary of Public Security, Sergio Berni, made a similar statement, adding that the investigation led by Judge Ariel Lijo will clarify the causes.

President Cristina Fernández de Kirchner had been operated from a subdural hematoma a few days before. Still in post-operative care, she was not informed of the event.

Fernando Solanas, candidate for Senator, blamed Minister Florencio Randazzo for the accident. He considers him responsible for the poor maintenance of the railways. Congresswoman Margarita Stolbizer asked that Randazzo and Planning Minister Julio de Vido resign. The Mayor of Tigre and candidate for Congress on the opposition Renewal Front ticket, Sergio Massa, preferred to wait for the investigations before making opinions, and criticized the lack of long term policies.

== Aftermath ==
Some of the relatives of the deceased in the 2012 accident repudiated this new incident. They considered that there is no proof of any sabotage, and pointed to the already manifested concerns about the condition of the specific unit that crashed. Gregorio Dalbón, hired to represent a number of the victims in this new incident, asked that the driver, Julio Benítez, be detained by Judge Lijo on the charges of gross negligence, destroying evidence and obstruction of justice.
