= Trenes Argentinos Operaciones =

Argentine state-owned railway company

Operadora Ferroviaria S.E.

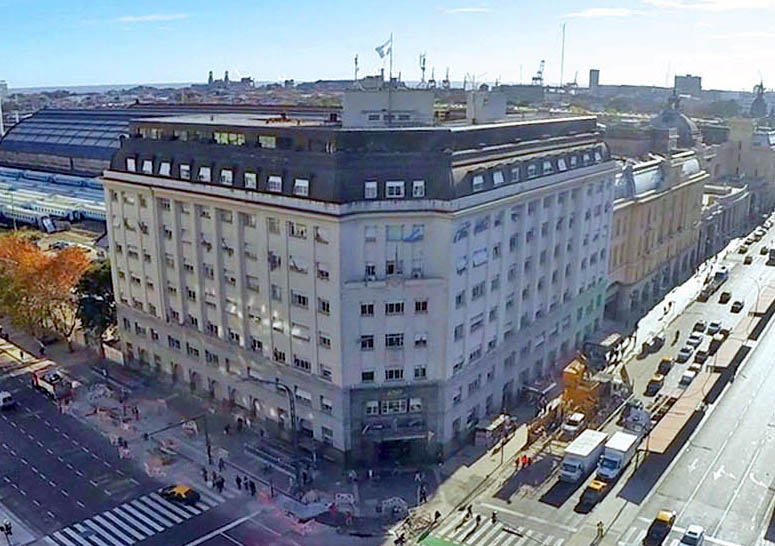
- Company headquarters in Retiro, Buenos Aires
- Trade name: Trenes Argentinos Operaciones
- Company type: State-owned
- Industry: Railway
- Predecessor: List: UGOMS; Soc. Com. Del Plata; Ferrocentral; SEFECHA; Argentren; Corredores Ferroviarios
- Founded: 2008; 18 years ago
- Founder: Government of Argentina
- Headquarters: Buenos Aires, Argentina
- Area served: National
- Key people: Luis A. Luque (President)
- Services: Railway transport and maintenance
- Owner: Government of Argentina
- Parent: Ferrocarriles Argentinos S.E.
- Website: argentina.gob.ar/transporte/trenes

Operadora Ferroviaria Sociedad del Estado (SOFSE), trading as Trenes Argentinos Operaciones, is an Argentine state-owned company created in 2008 to operate passenger services in Argentina. It operates as a division of Ferrocarriles Argentinos S.E.

Since March 2015, SOFSE has run the Buenos Aires commuter rail services Mitre, San Martín, Roca and Belgrano Sur lines previously operated by private companies.

== History ==
=== Background ===
After the railway privatisation in Argentina began in 1989, the railway assets that had not been given in concession were taken over by Ferrocarriles Argentinos before being dissolved.

From 1996 to 2000 those assets were administered by "Ente Nacional de Administración de Bienes Ferroviarios" (ENABIEF) created through a National Decree promulgated by the Presidency of Argentina. On June 1, 2000, ENABIEF merged to Dirección Nacional de Bienes del Estado.

From then on, the "Organismo Nacional de Administración de Bienes" (ONABE) began its activities as an organisation created to manage the assets not directly affected by State activities.

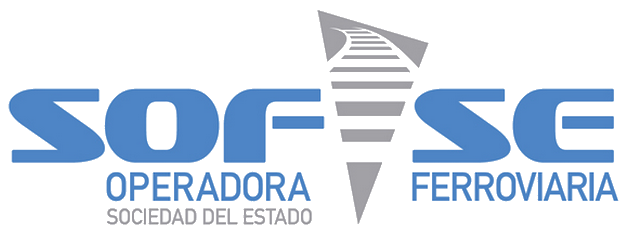
The first SOFSE logo (2008)

Law 26.352 promulgated in 2008 re-organized the railway operations in Argentina, creating two State organisations, the "Administración de Infraestructuras Ferroviarias" (ADIF) and the "Operadora Ferroviaria" (SOFSE). Decree N° 752/08, sanctioned in May 2008, has regulated the activities of the then recently established company from that point onwards.

=== Further operations ===
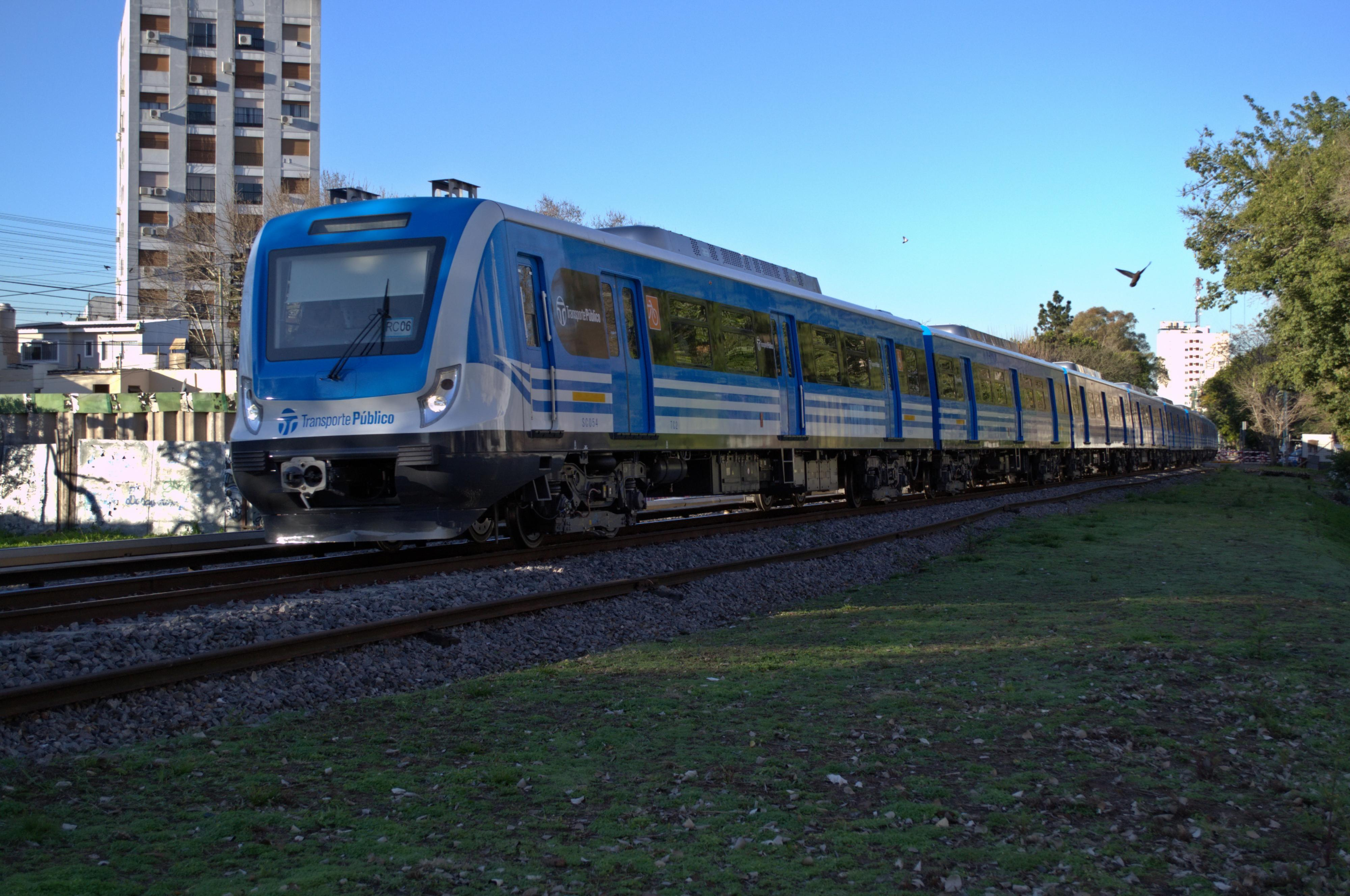
A CSR train running on Sarmiento line

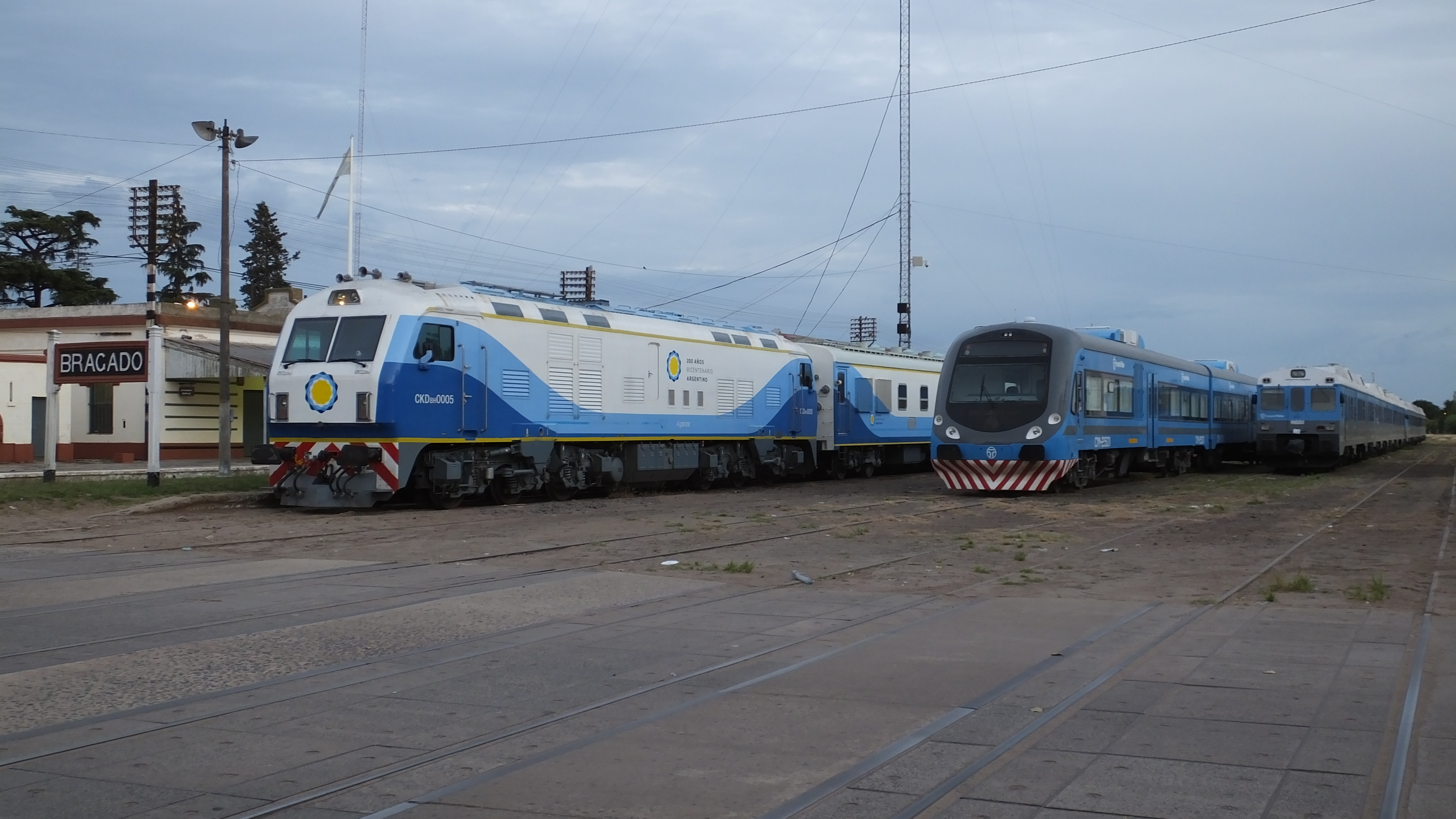
SOFSE Materfer and CNR CKD8 rolling stock in Bragado

Although established in 2008, SOFSE became active two years later, when the organisation took over the railway services in Chaco Province left by Servicios Ferroviarios del Chaco (SEFECHA). In 2011 the organisation added the regional services of Salta and Buenos Aires Provinces. When the Ministry of Transport was created in 2012, SOFSE took over all the urban services not granted in concession of Greater Buenos Aires. The society also began to operate interurban services such as train services to Córdoba, Tucumán cities and other services previously operated by the Government of Entre Ríos Province.

In June 2013, SOFSE took over the Tren de la Costa when the Government decided the company would be managed by the Argentine State after revoking the contract with Sociedad Comercial del Plata.

In September 2013, the Government of Argentina designed SOFSE to operate the Mitre and Sarmiento lines, after their contracts of concession were revoked to Trenes de Buenos Aires. This decision was officially promulgated through Resolution N° 1083/13.

SOFSE temporarily operated the Mitre line until the Government of Argentina re-privatised it, giving the line concession to "Corredores Ferroviarios S.A." (a private company part of Emepa Group) on February 12, 2014.

In December 2014, brand new trains acquired by the Government of Argentina from Chinese company CNR Dalian, started to run luxury services from Constitución to Mar del Plata. The classic service continued to be operated by Ferrobaires.

In February 2015, services from Buenos Aires to Rufino, Santa Fe were reestablished after 22 years. The service runs with brand-new trains acquired from China on Ferrocarril San Martín tracks. Trains make stops at Chacabuco, Junín, Vedia and Alberdi, among other stations.

In March 2015, SOFSE started to run the CNR CKD8 trains from Retiro to Córdoba. Due to the poor condition of the tracks, trains took 19½ hours to run the 700 km (430 mi). This was more than twice the time that it took in 1938, when services operated by Central Argentine took 9 hours to connect both cities with two intermediate stops.

=== Commuter rail renationalisation ===
SOFSE took over Belgrano Sur and Roca (operated by Argentren) and Mitre and San Martín (operated by Corredores Ferroviarios) lines after the Government of Argentina rescinded the contracts signed with both companies on March 2, 2015. The contract terms specified that the concession could be cancelled with no right to claim compensation. The agreements had been signed in February 2014, committing Argentren and Corredores Ferroviarios to operate the lines.

=== Latest news ===
In January 2016, the Ministry of Transport ceased operations over services to La Pampa Province. The Government took the decision based on the low demand of the Santa Rosa–General Pico line and the poor conditions of some bridges that had deteriorated after the flooding in August 2015.

In June 2016, the Buenos Aires–Rosario service extended operations to Rosario Norte Station (located at the north of the city, closer to the downtown) instead of Rosario Sur, which had been terminus until then.

In March 2023, Trenes Argentinos announced the return of passenger services to Mendoza Province, which had been interrupted since 1993 during the Carlos Menem presidency. As the former Mendoza railway station had been converted into a tram stop and added to the Metrotranvía network, the terminus was set in Palmira, distant 5 km from the city of Mendoza. A test ride was run in March, nevertheless it was severely criticized due to the excessive journey time (27 hours) alleging that in the 1960s the travel took only 13 hours. After a delay that took more than two months, the service (that had terminus in Justo Daract, San Luis Province) was finally reestablished to reach Palmira in June 2023.

Nevertheless, in successive years several railway lines were closed by Trenes Argentinos, in most of the cases the company alleged increasing maintenance costs, lower demand, and infrastructure problems as causal factors. Some of the closed services were the tourist service Mercedes–Tomas Jofré (after an accident where a truck destroyed one of its bridges in 2024; the line had been reopened only one year before. As the bridge was never repaired, the service continues inactive), Retiro–Justo Daract, Retiro–Palmira, and the Bragado–Pehuajó (2024) and General Guido–Pinamar (April 2025) branches.

In 2025, several services were indefinitely suspended by Trenes Argentinos such as trains to Córdoba and San Miguel de Tucumán, both in December 2025. The company explained that the suspension was due to track repair work that has been underway since a previous derailment in September.

== Services operated ==
As of January 2026

The following is a list of services operated by Operadora Ferroviaria in Argentina. The list includes urban railways such as Mitre, San Martín, Roca and Belgrano Sur lines previously managed by private companies.

=== Metropolitan ===
Commuter rail services within the Buenos Aires Province:

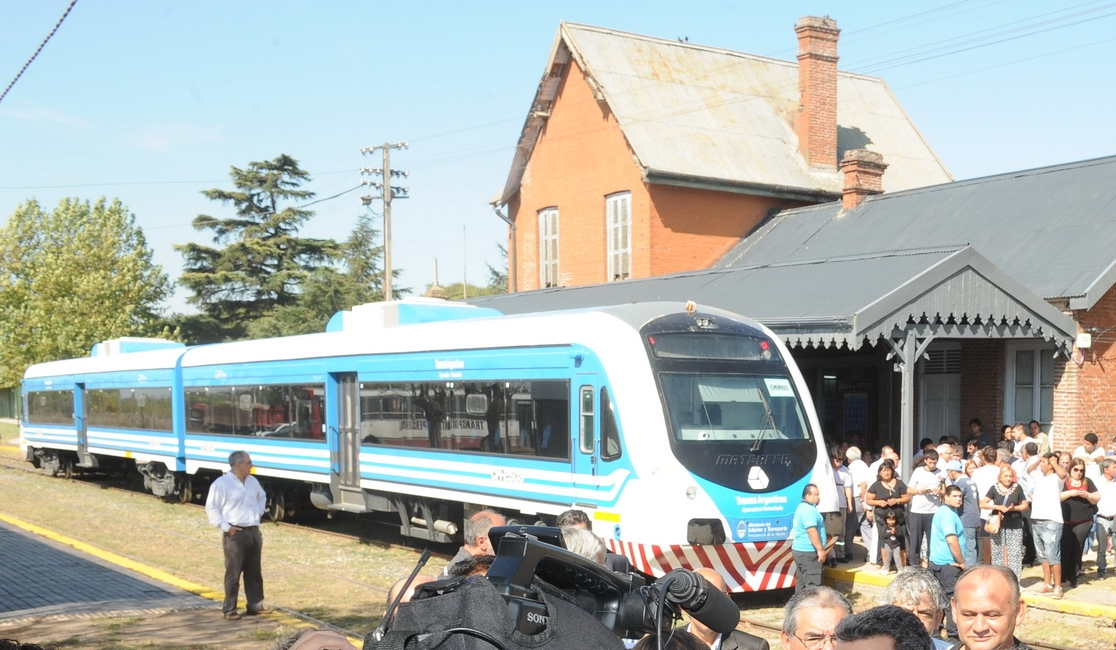
A Materfer DMU on the Mitre Line, 2015

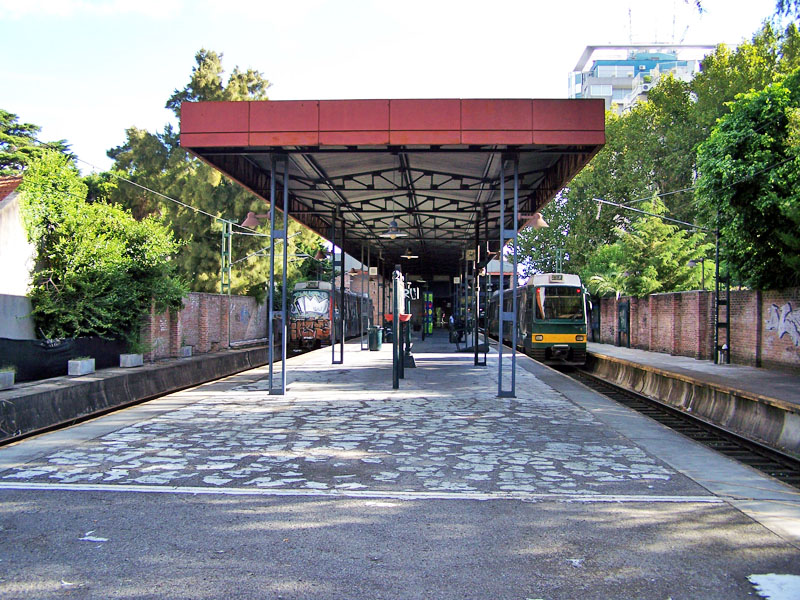
Maipú station platforms in Olivos, Buenos Aires

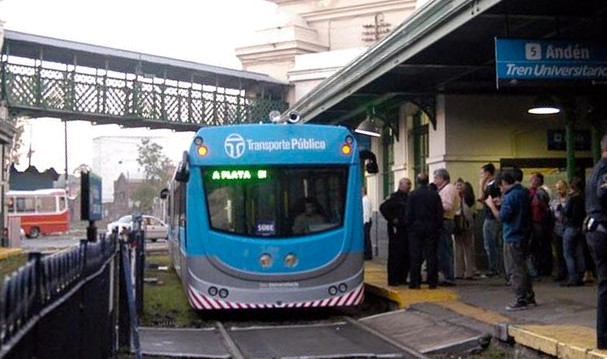
University train of La Plata

Terminus cities	Service	Dist.	Line
Once – Moreno	Electric	45	Sarmiento
Moreno – Mercedes	Diesel	62	Sarmiento
Merlo – Lobos	Diesel	90	Sarmiento
Constitución – Ezeiza	Electric	35	Roca
Ezeiza – Cañuelas	Diesel	35	Roca
Constitución – Alejandro Korn	Electric	45	Roca
Alejandro Korn – Chascomús	Diesel	93	Roca
Constitución – La Plata	Electric	60	Roca
La Plata – Policlínico (University train)	Diesel	4	Roca
Constitución – Temperley	Electric	19	Roca
Temperley – Haedo	Diesel	30	Roca
Constitución – Bosques (via Quilmes)	Electric	19	Roca
Constitución – Bosques (via Temperley)	Electric	19	Roca
Bosques – Gutiérrez	Diesel	7	Roca
Cañuelas – Lobos	Diesel	37	Roca
Dr. A. Sáenz – Villars	Diesel	70	Belgrano Sur
Dr. A. Sáenz – Marinos Cruc. Belgrano	Diesel	43	Belgrano Sur
Retiro – Tigre	Electric	30	Mitre
Retiro – B. Mitre	Electric	15	Mitre
Retiro – José León Suárez	Electric	27	Mitre
Victoria – Capilla del Señor	Diesel	60	Mitre
Villa Ballester – Zárate	Diesel	75	Mitre
Retiro – Doctor Cabred	Diesel	70	San Martín
Maipú – Delta	Electric	15	Tren de la Costa (Note: The original line became part of the General Mitre Railway after the 1948 nationalisation. The B. Mitre–Delta route (a part of the branch that had a similar path to the Retiro–Tigre line) was closed by the Arturo Frondizi's administration in 1961 to reduce costs. The service was put into operation again under the name "Tren de la Costa" in 1995, being run by private concessionaire Sociedad Comercial del Plata. Since the concession's revocation in 2013, the line has been operated by Trenes Argentinos, although the company has not included this service into the Mitre Line.)

=== Long distance ===
Inter-city services along Argentina, As of January 2026

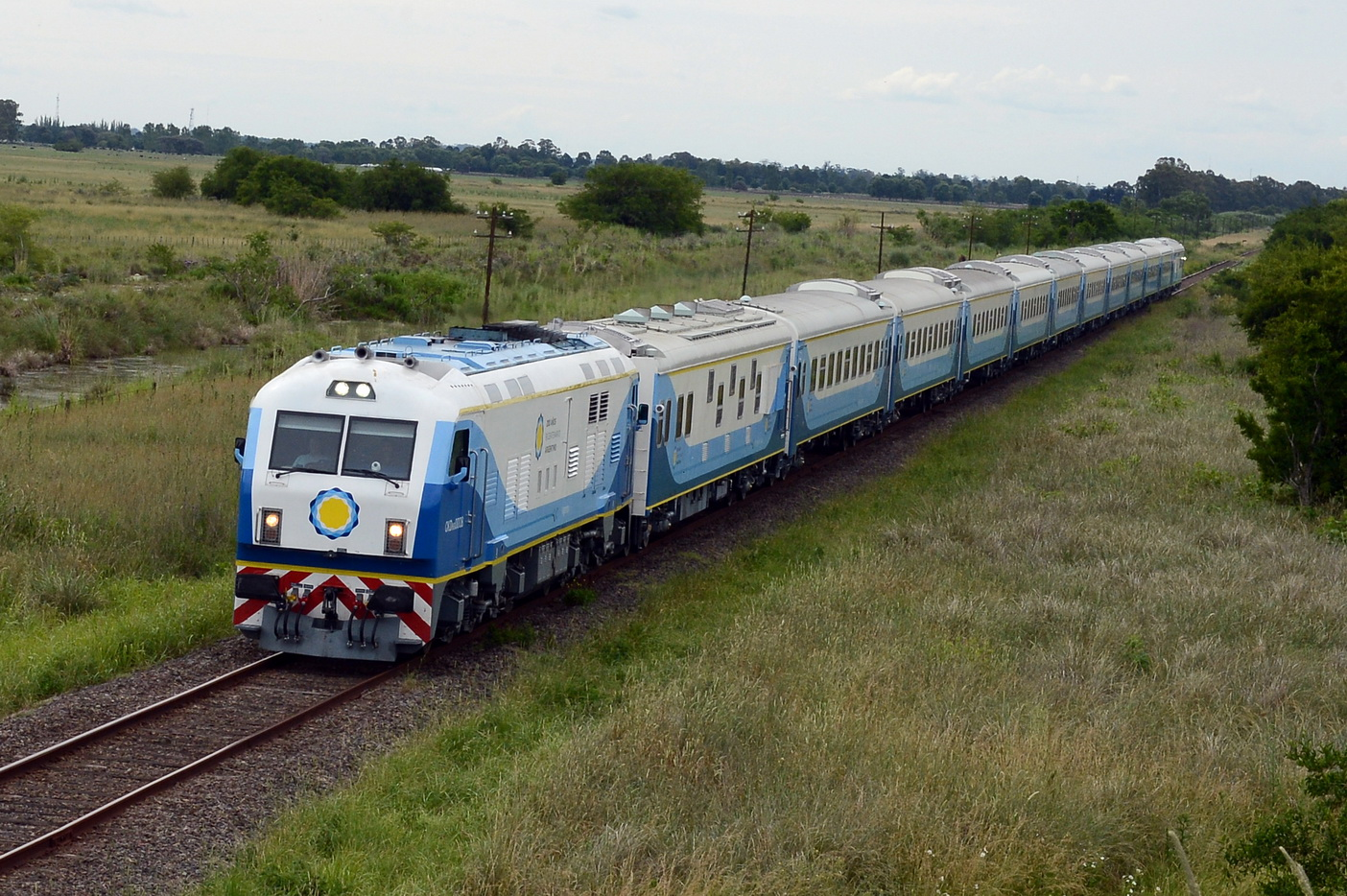
A CNR locomotive running express services to Mar del Plata

Province/s covered	Terminus	Frec.	Dist.	Company/Line
Buenos Aires	Constitución – Mar del Plata (Note: The service was inactive from August 2015 to July 2017 due to the poor condition of the rail tracks.)	2 pd	400	Roca
Buenos Aires	Once – Bragado	3 pw	304	Sarmiento
Buenos Aires	Retiro (SM) – Junín	1 pd	254	San Martín
Buenos Aires – Santa Fe	Retiro (M) – Rosario Norte	1 pd	315	Mitre

=== Regional ===
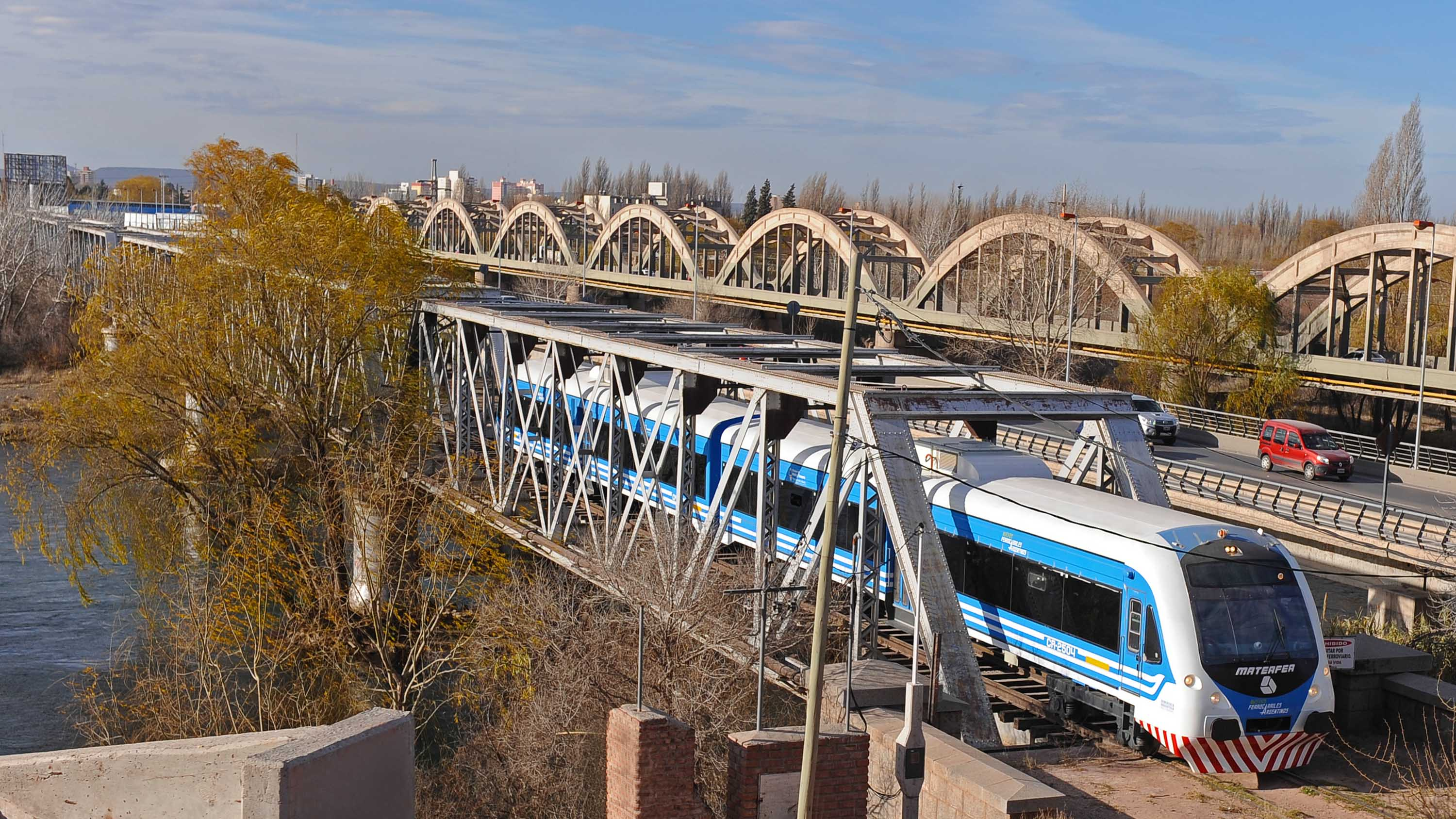
Tren del Valle running on Neuquén bridge

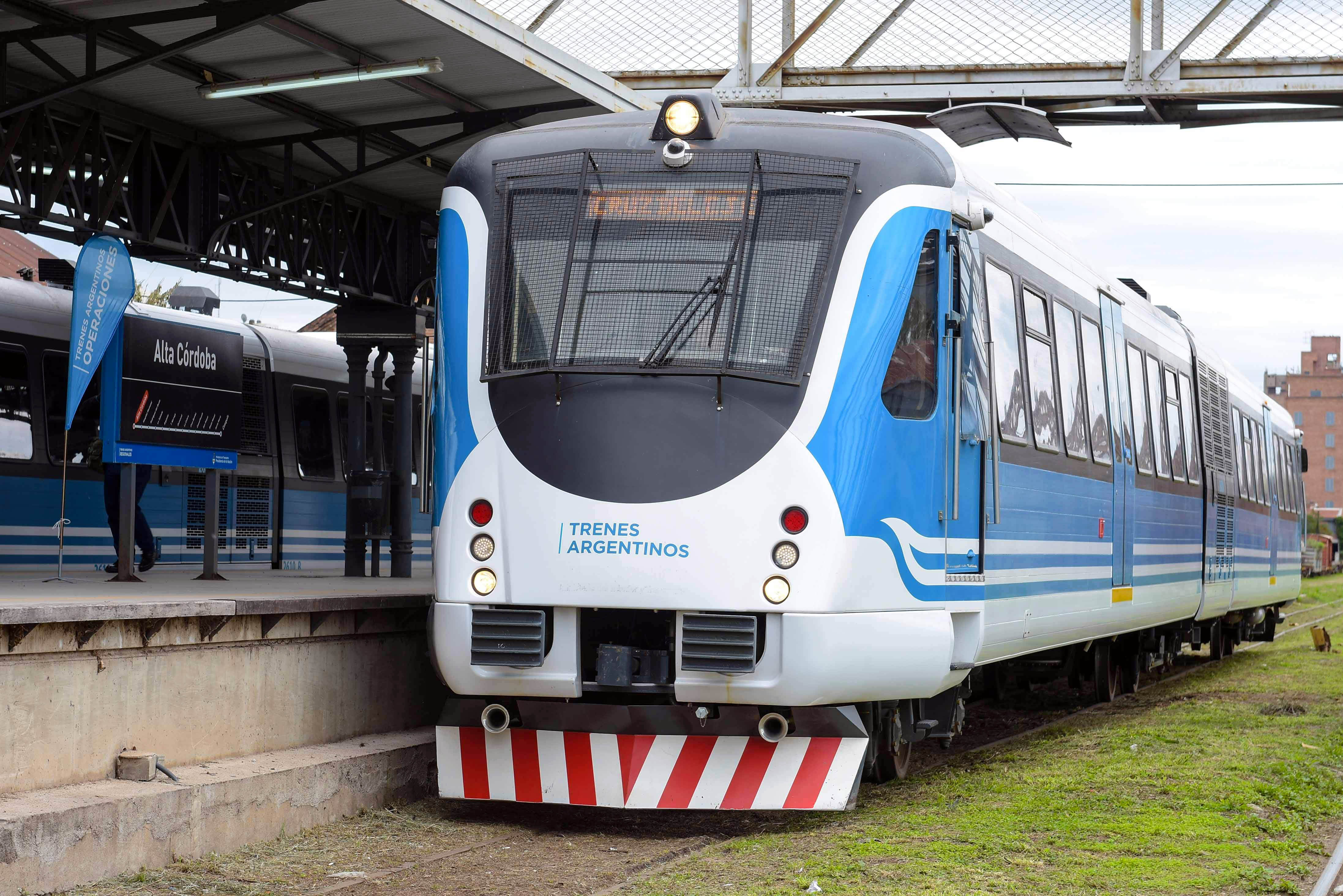
Tren de las Sierras at Alta Córdoba station

Province/s covered	Terminus	Frec.	Dist.	Company/Line
Chaco	R.S. Peña – Chorotis	7 pw	185	Belgrano
Chaco	Resistencia – Los Amores	4 pw	162	Belgrano
Córdoba	Córdoba / Alta Córdoba – Valle Hermoso (Tren de las Sierras)	6 pd	66	Belgrano
Córdoba	Córdoba – Villa María	3 pw	151	Mitre
Entre Ríos	Paraná – Jorge Méndez	4 pd	16	Urquiza
Neuquén – Río Negro	Cipolletti – Plottier (Tren del Valle)	10 pd	16	Roca
Salta	Gral. Güemes – Campo Quijano	4 pw	85	Belgrano

=== International ===
Regions covered	Terminus	Frec.	Dist.	Company/Line
(Argentina) Misiones – (Paraguay) Itapúa	Posadas – Encarnación (Note: International service to Paraguayan city Encarnación.) (Note: Operated jointly with private company "Casimiro Zbikoski S.A.".)	2 pd	8	Urquiza

=== Maps of services operated ===
As of October 2024

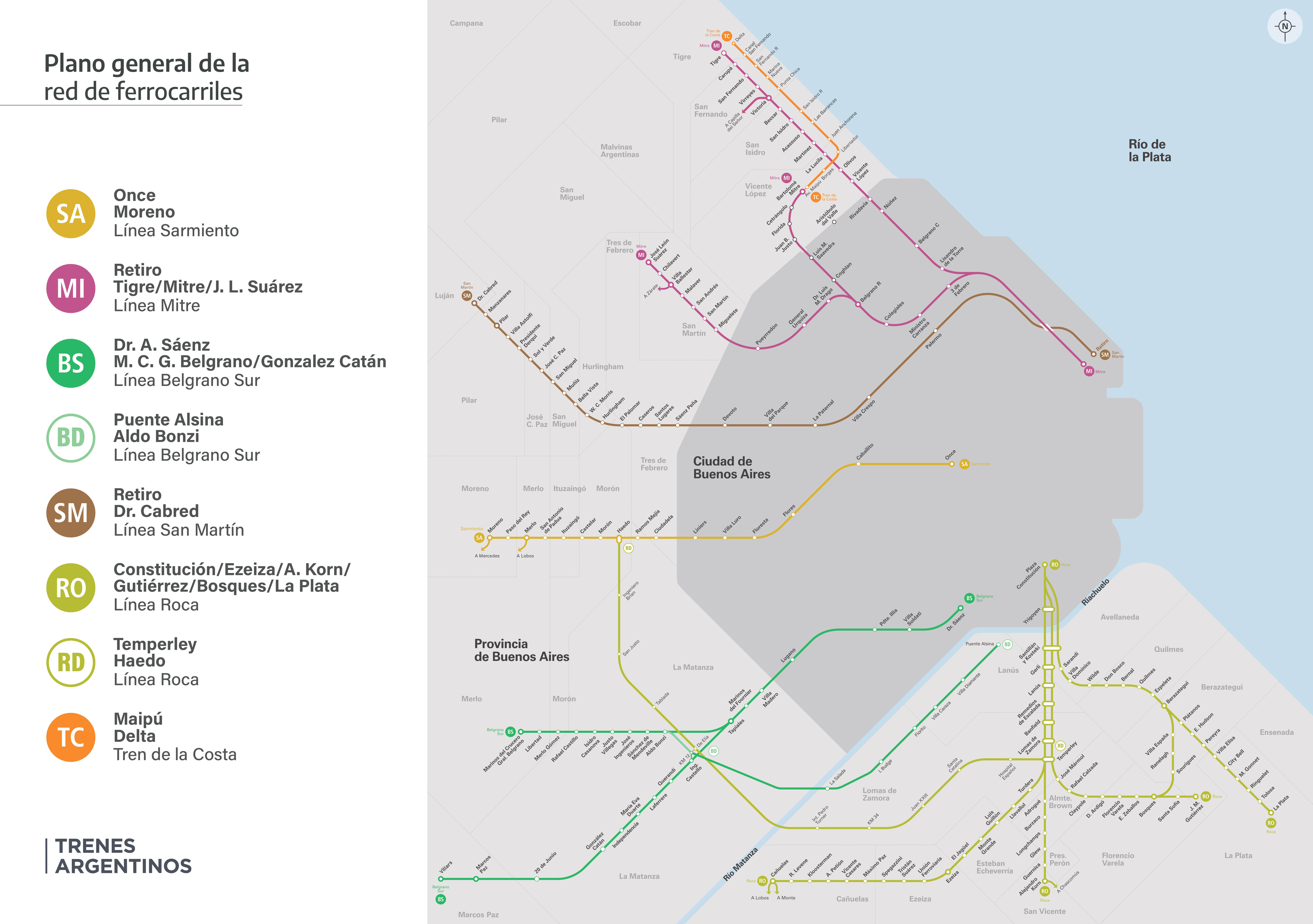
Metropolitan services (Buenos Aires)

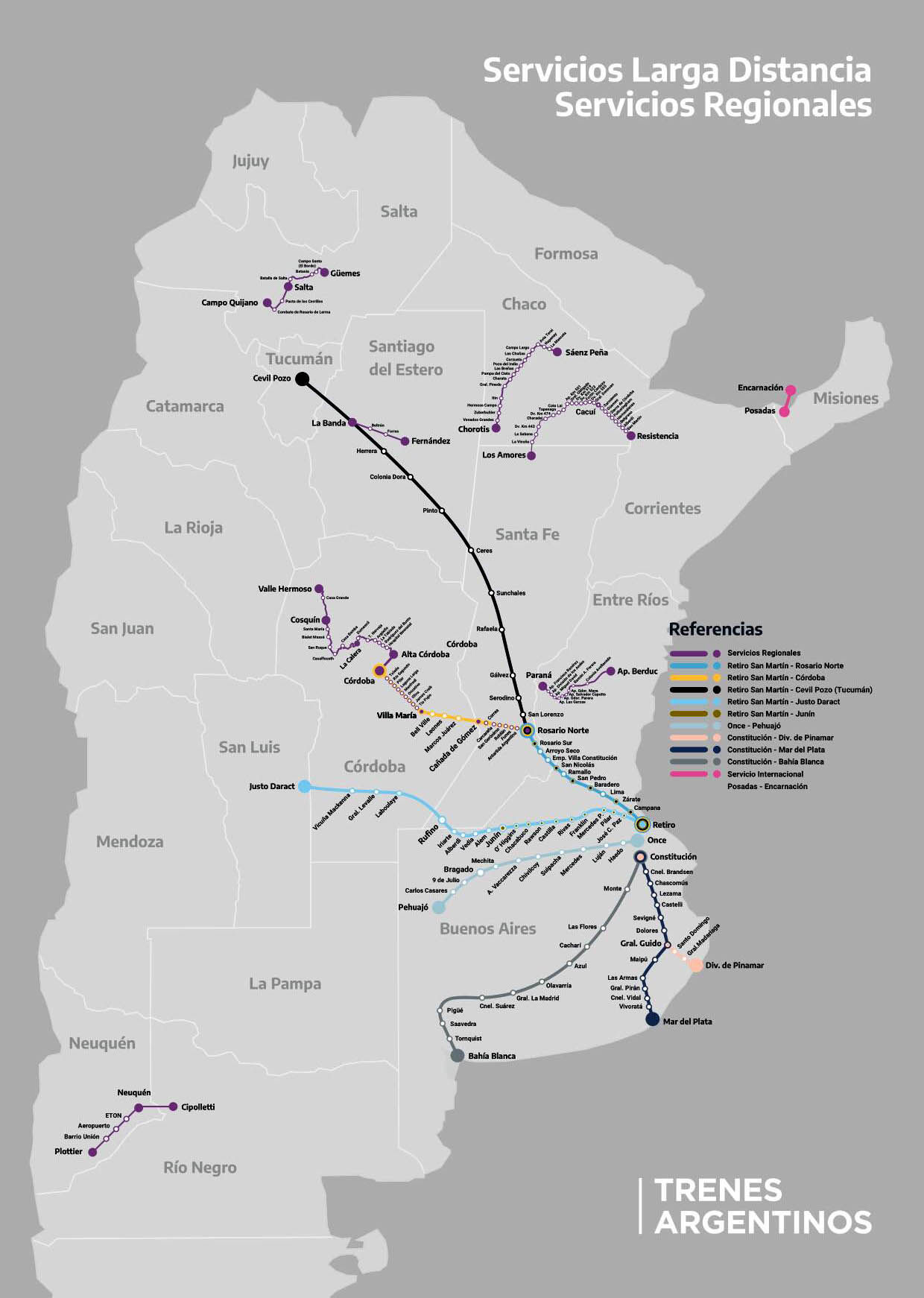
Long distance services
