= Mitre Line =

Broad gauge commuter rail service in Buenos Aires Province

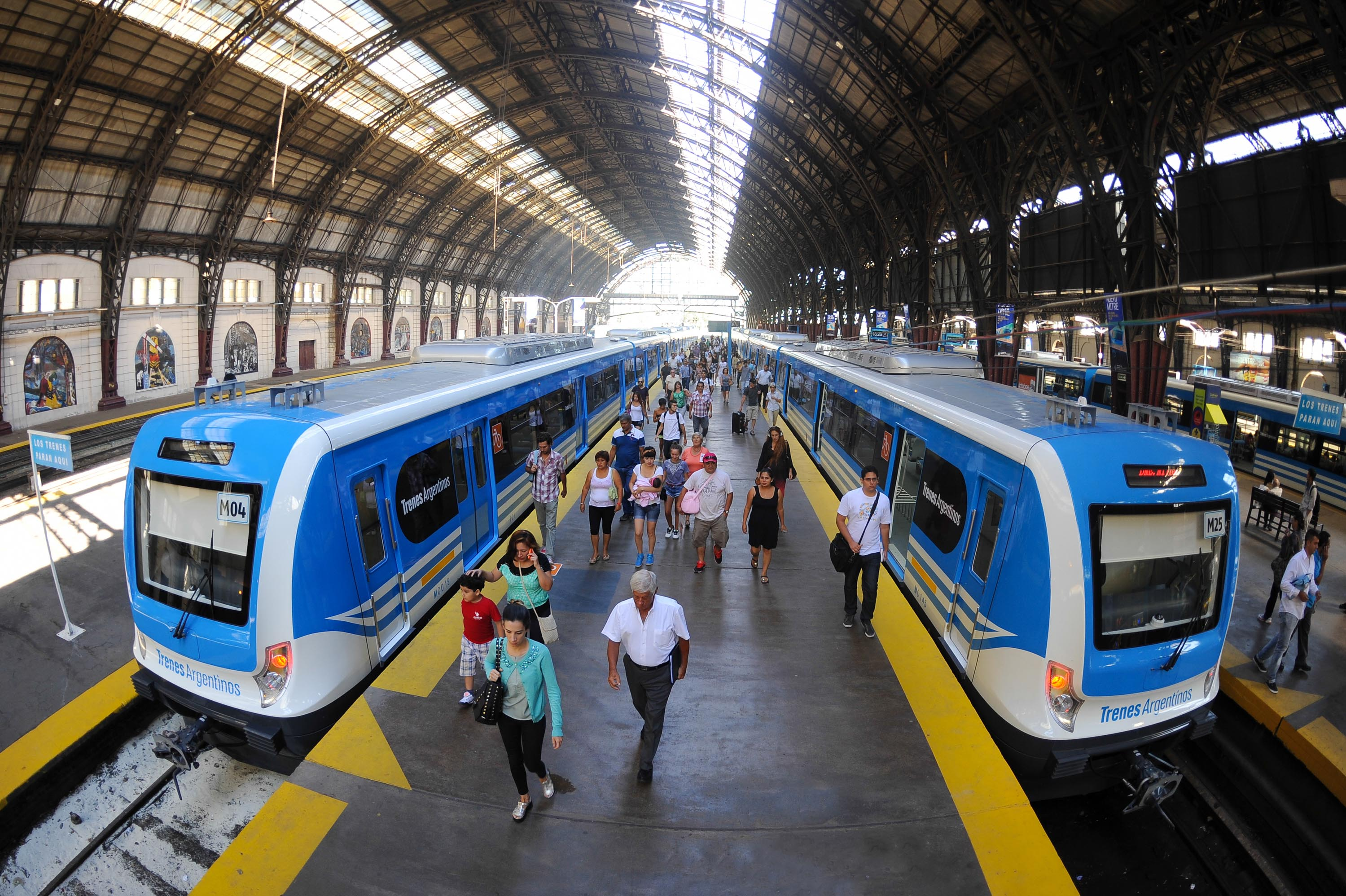
- CSR electric multiple units at Retiro station, February 2015.

Overview
- Service type: Commuter rail
- Status: Active
- Locale: Buenos Aires Province
- Predecessor: Central Argentine
- First service: 1948; 78 years ago
- Current operator: Trenes Argentinos
- Former operator: Corredores Ferroviarios
- Website: Mitre Line

Route
- Termini: Retiro: Tigre; B. Mitre; José L. Suárez; Zárate; Capilla del Señor
- Stops: 57
- Distance travelled: 180 km (110 mi)
- Average journey time: Retiro–Tigre: 75 min.; Retiro–B.Mitre: 50 min.; Retiro–J.L. Suárez: 65 min.; J.L. Suárez–Zárate: 120 min.; Victoria–Capilla del Señor: 70 min.
- Service frequency: Retiro–Tigre: 20 min.; Retiro–B.Mitre: 30 min.; Retiro–J.L. Suárez: 20 min.; J.L. Suárez–Zárate: 70 min.; Victoria–Capilla del Señor: 7 trains per day

Technical
- Rolling stock: CSR EMUs (electric); Materfer CMM 400-2 (diesel)
- Track gauge: 1,676 mm (5 ft 6 in)
- Track owner: Government of Argentina
Route map
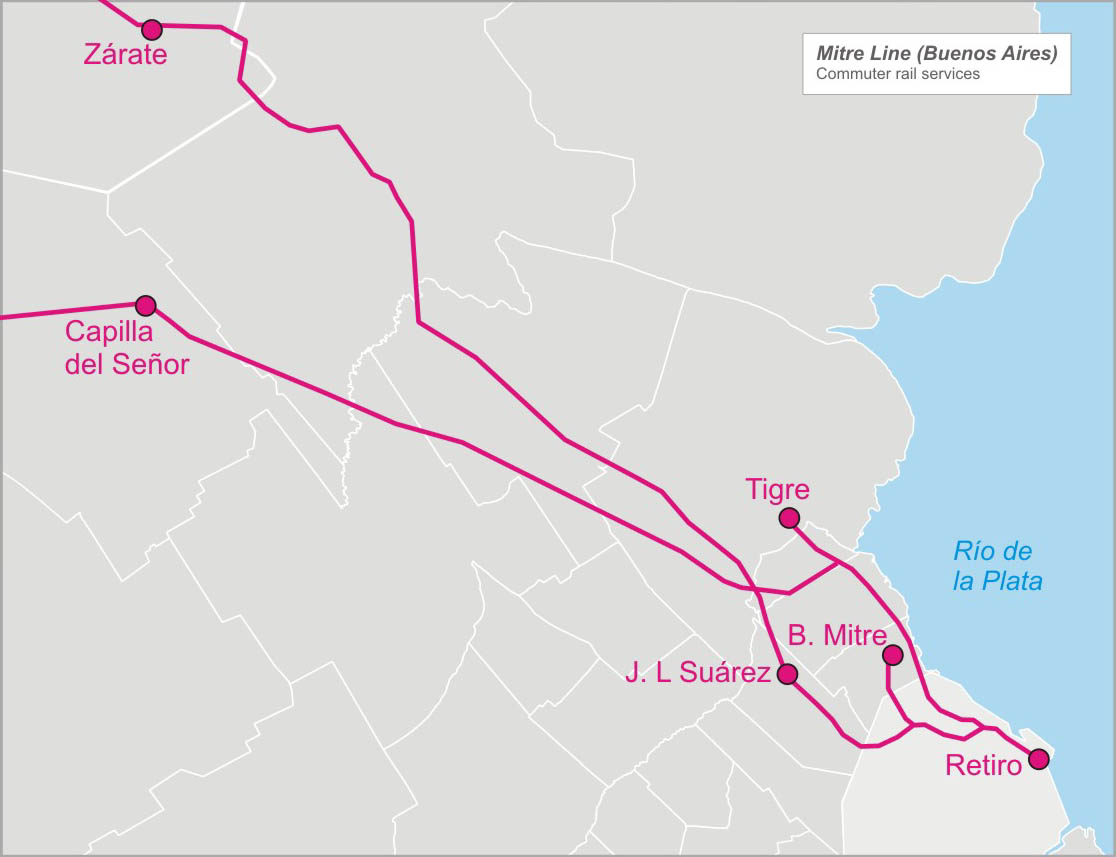

The Mitre line is an Argentine broad gauge commuter rail service in Buenos Aires Province and is part of the Ferrocarril General Bartolomé Mitre division. The service is currently operated by the state-owned company Operadora Ferroviaria Sociedad del Estado after the Government of Argentina rescinded its contract with Corredores Ferroviarios in March 2015.

== History ==
=== Background ===
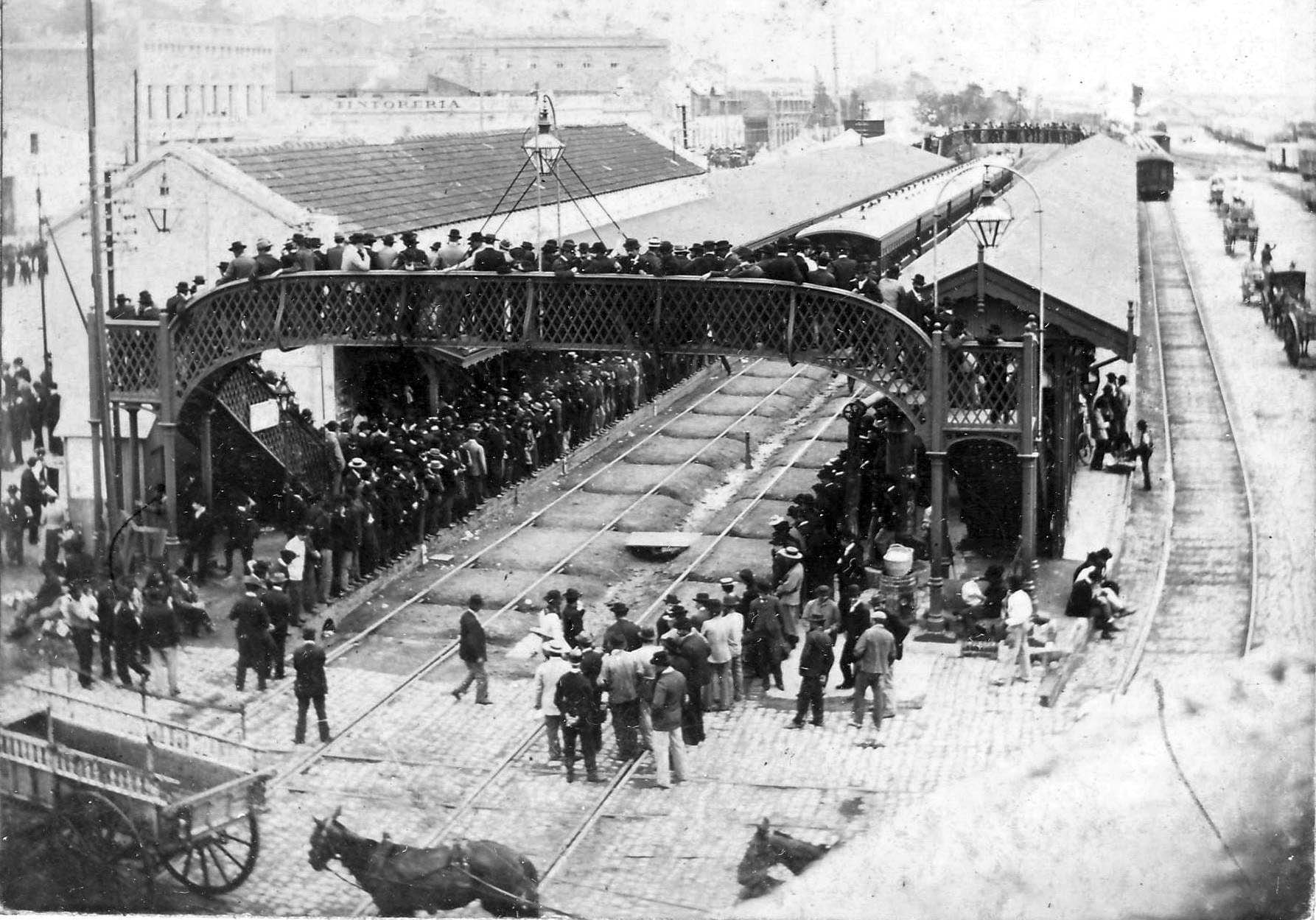
Old Retiro station, c. 1890s. Current building was inaugurated in 1915

The first line was built and operated by the Buenos Aires Northern Railway, a British-owned company that ran trains from Central Station (then from Retiro) to Tigre, joining both cities in 1857. The company was then taken over by the Central Argentine Railway in 1888 due to financial problems.

In 1891, Victoria station was inaugurated. Trains to Zelaya and Capilla del Señor departed from Victoria for the first time one year later. In 1916, the Retiro-Tigre line was electrified, becoming the first electrified railway system in South America. New British Thomson-Houston (BTH) multiple units were acquired to run on the line. The CAR also installed the first crossbuck and manually operated gates on the many existing level crossings.

During successive years, several new stations were built by the company, including Beccar (1913), La Lucila (1933), Acassuso (1934) and Virreyes (1938).

=== Ferrocarriles Argentinos ===
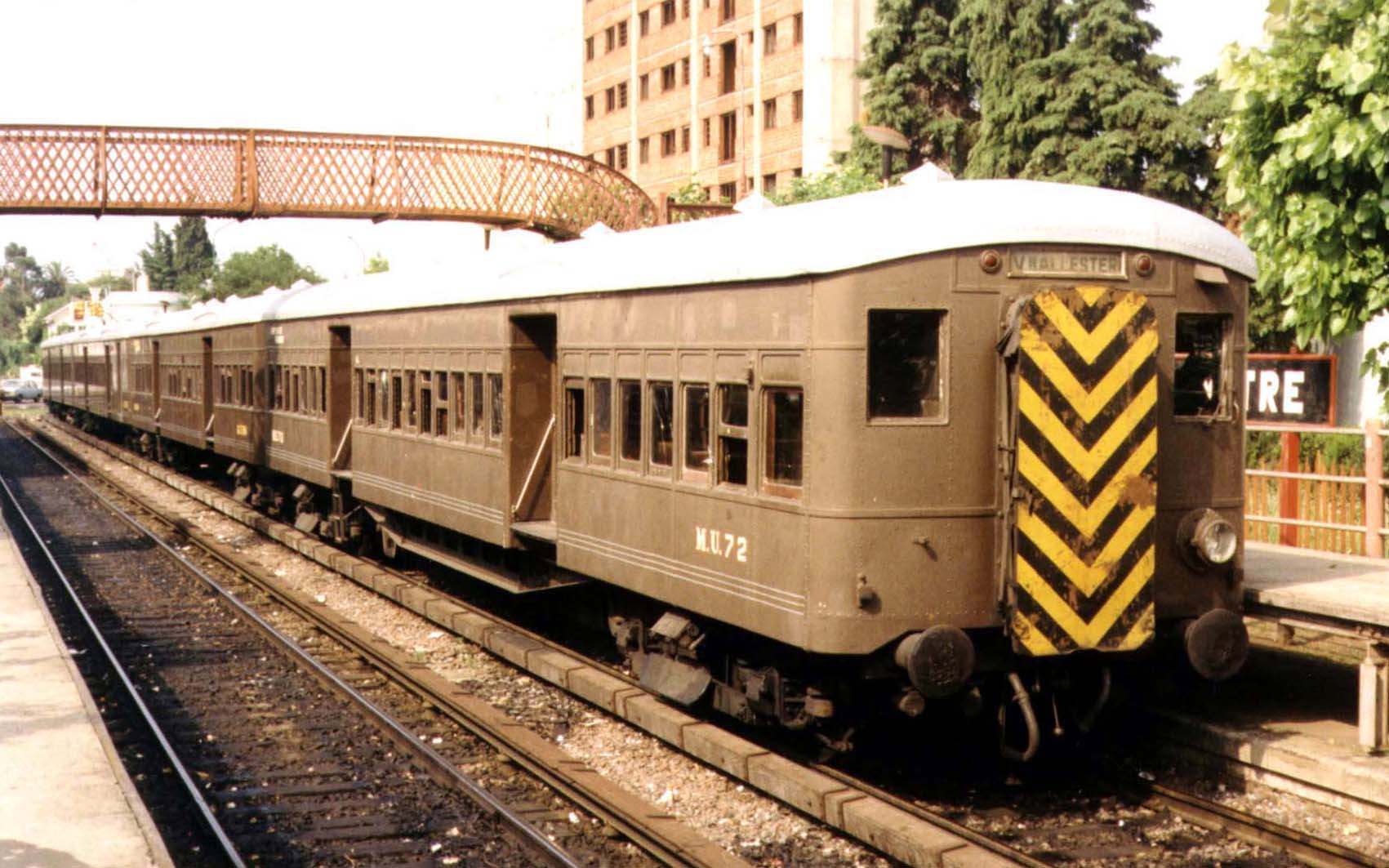
A Metropolitan Vickers in B. Mitre (1990)

When the Government of Argentina led by Juan Perón nationalised British and French railway companies in 1948, the state-owned company Ferrocarriles Argentinos took over all the railway lines in the country.

In 1962, the FIAT 7131, a railcar manufactured by FIAT Concord, made its debut in the Villa Ballester-Zárate and Victoria-Capilla del Señor sections of Ferrocarril Mitre, then managed by Ferrocarriles Argentinos (FA). These light railcars replaced Ganz Works railcars that had run on those lines since 1938.

The lack of maintenance of the FIAT 7131 coaches meant that some of them went out of service, so in 1987 Ferrocarriles Argentinos acquired new light railcars for the Zárate and Capilla del Señor branches. The company bought 8 units made by Materfer which were soon nicknamed Pitufos (a Spanish translation for "Smurfs" due to their small size). Nevertheless, the limited seating capacity and poor damping of those units mean that the 7131 coaches continued to be used.

=== Privatisation: TBA ===
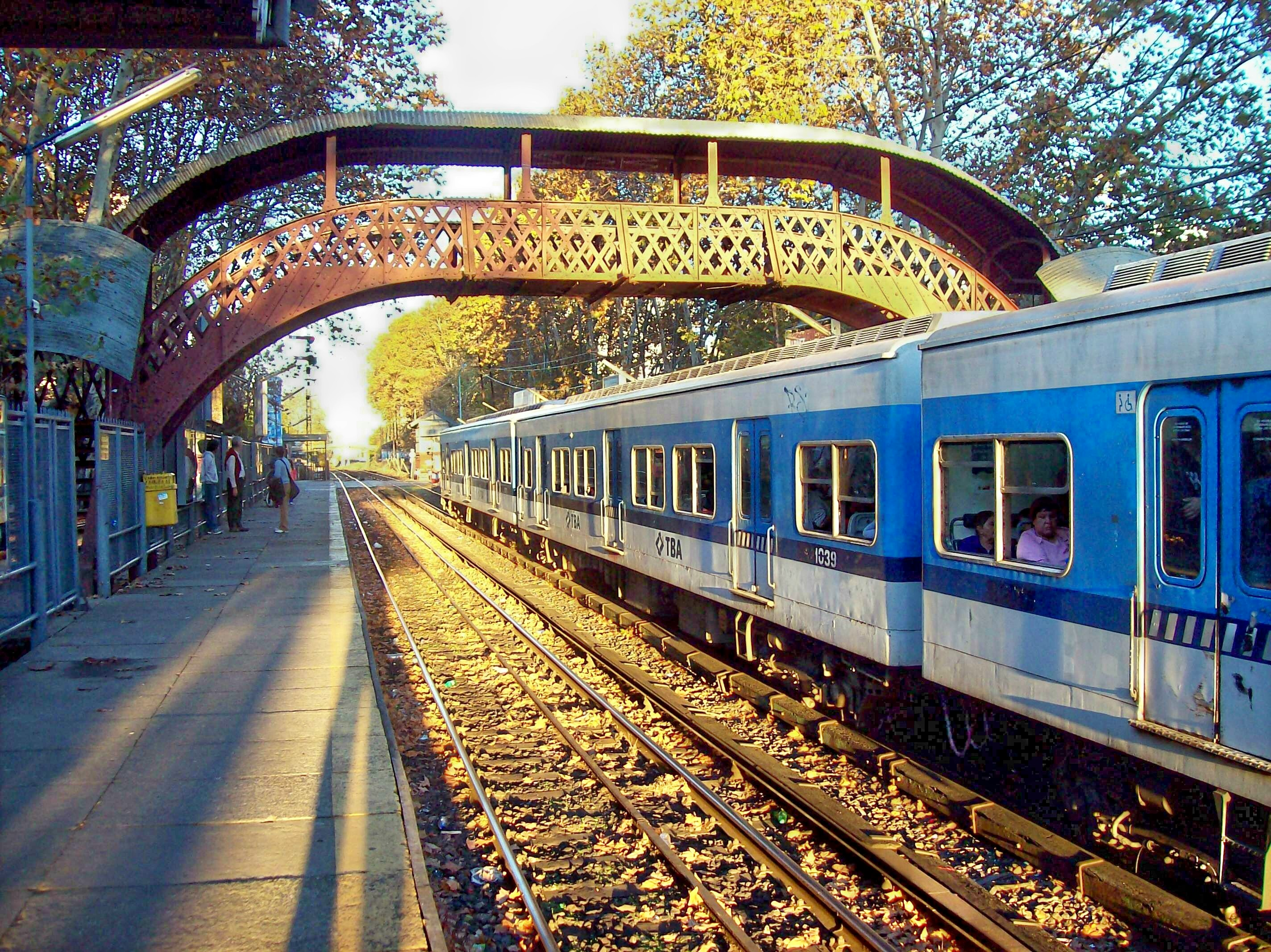
Toshiba multiple unit at Colegiales, 2010

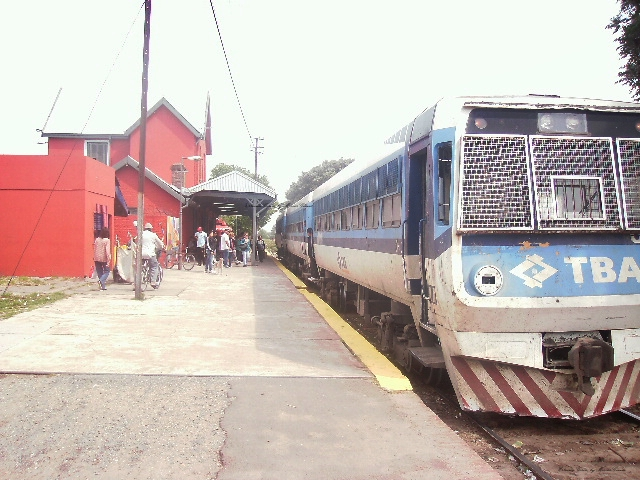
A Materfer railcar (Pitufo) in Garín in 2011

FA operated the trains until 1991 when FEMESA temporarily took over all the urban services prior to the services being privatised. After the Government of Carlos Menem privatised the urban railways services, private company Trenes de Buenos Aires (TBA) took over the Mitre Line.

When the Government of Argentina decided to privative all the urban railway services in 1992, the Mitre Line was given the concession for TBA (which also took over Sarmiento Line) through Decree N° 730/95.

During the first two years of the concession, TBA met the requirements specified in the contract regarding the frequency of service, with an average of 98%. By February 1999 the consortium had invested US$200 million including the reconstruction of 220 Toshiba wagons, and the remodelling of 13 stations and workshops. In addition, a new ticket selling system was introduced with the installation of vending machines.

One of the most notable improvements was the introduction of "Puma" coaches on the Retiro-Tigre branch. These coaches were built by local factory Emprendimientos Ferroviarios (EMFER) and featured air conditioning, ABS brakes and computer-supervising systems.

In 1997 the Government decided to modify the contracts of concession with a plan of modernisation worth US$2.5 billion. The future investments included acquiring 492 brand-new electric multiple units, the refurbishing of more than 100 km of existing tracks, and the installation of new signalling, among other improvements.

Nevertheless, the Government of Fernando De la Rúa (which had come to power in 1999) made changes to the original project, reducing the amount of the budget to US$1.3 billion. The State granted subsidies to TBA (and the rest of the private operators) as a way to compensate for the losses arising from the change in plans and to avoid fare increases.

Due to the lack of investment in the Mitre Line, the quality of the service decreased considerably. TBA operated the line until the 2012 Once station rail disaster happened. As a result, the National Government revoked the concession granted to TBA and gave the Mitre and Sarmiento lines to the State operator UGOMS, that then ran the lines until 2014 when it was transferred under concession to Corredores Ferroviarios.

=== New concession ===
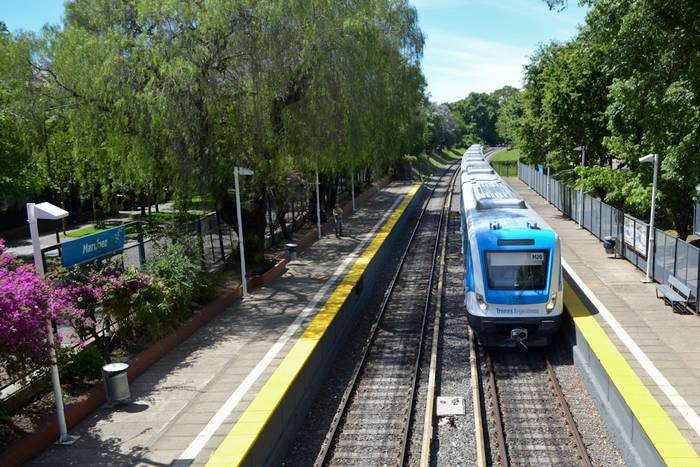
Martínez station with new CSR rolling stock in 2014

On 12 February 2014, the Government of Argentina granted the operation of the line to the private company Corredores Ferroviarios. That same year the Government announced the acquisition of new coaches to increase the Mitre Line's rolling stock. The coaches were manufactured by the Chinese company CSR, with the first coaches arriving in June 2014.

In November 2014, the Retiro-Tigre section of Mitre Line renewed its fleet of electric trains, adding a total of 12 brand new trains for that service. The CSR trains replaced the old Toshiba cars that had been brought to Argentina in the 1960s for the Mitre and Sarmiento lines. The purchase cost $250 million was paid by the National Government.

The branch line to José L. Suárez's fleet was renewed completely with the same Chinese trains in January 2015.

=== Renationalisation ===
State-owned company Operadora Ferroviaria Sociedad del Estado took over the Mitre line (operated by Corredores Ferroviarios) on 2 March 2015 after the Government of Argentina rescinded the contracts that had been signed with the company. The contract terms specified that the concession could be cancelled with no right to claim compensation. The agreements had been signed in February 2014 and had committed Argentren and Corredores Ferroviarios to operate the lines. In 2021 transport minister Alexis Guerrera decided not to renew the freight concession with freight operation transferred to Argentinean Trains Cargo.

=== Current works ===
In 2017, the Ministry of Transport announced the construction of a viaduct for the Retiro–Tigre branch of Mitre Line in Buenos Aires. The viaduct would extend from Dorrego Avenue in Palermo to Congreso Avenue in Núñez for 3.9 kilometres. Works began in September 2017. The project also included a total refurbishment of Lisandro de la Torre and Belgrano C stations. The viaduct was opened to traffic on 10 May 2019 by President Mauricio Macri leading to the removal eight level crossings.

=== Historic operators ===
Companies that have operated the Sarmiento Line since it was established after the 1948 nationalisation are:

Operator	Period
Ferrocarriles Argentinos	1948–1991
FEMESA	1991–1995
Trenes de Buenos Aires	1995–2012
UGOMS	2012–2013
SOFSE	2013–2014
Corredores Ferroviarios	2014–2015
Trenes Argentinos	2015–present

== Train services ==
Mitre Line services as of October 2026:

Start	End	Km.	Type
Retiro	Tigre	30	Electric
Retiro	B. Mitre	15	Electric
Retiro	José León Suárez	27	Electric
Victoria	Capilla del Señor	60	Diesel
Villa Ballester	Zárate	75	Diesel

== Gallery ==
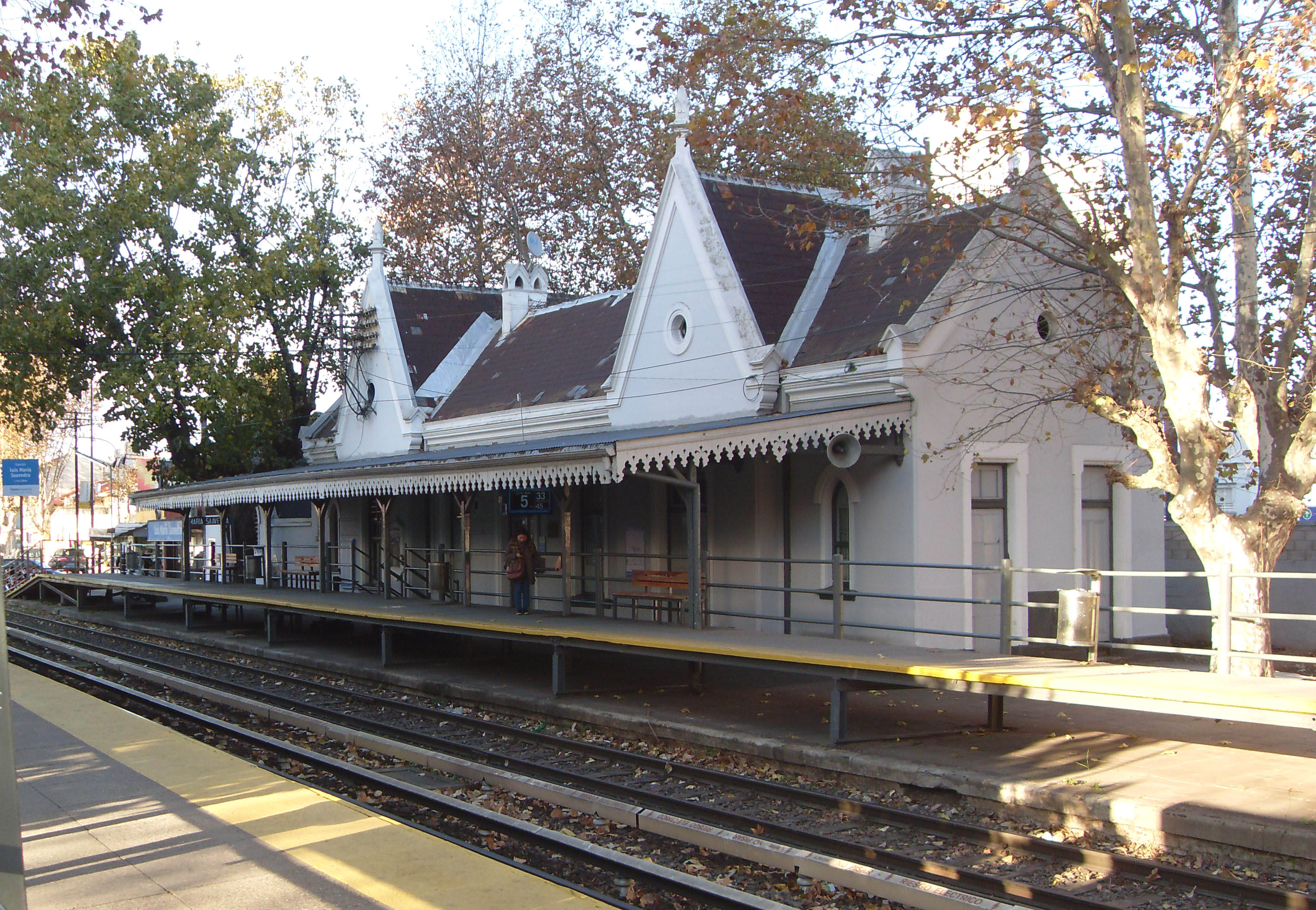
Saavedra station

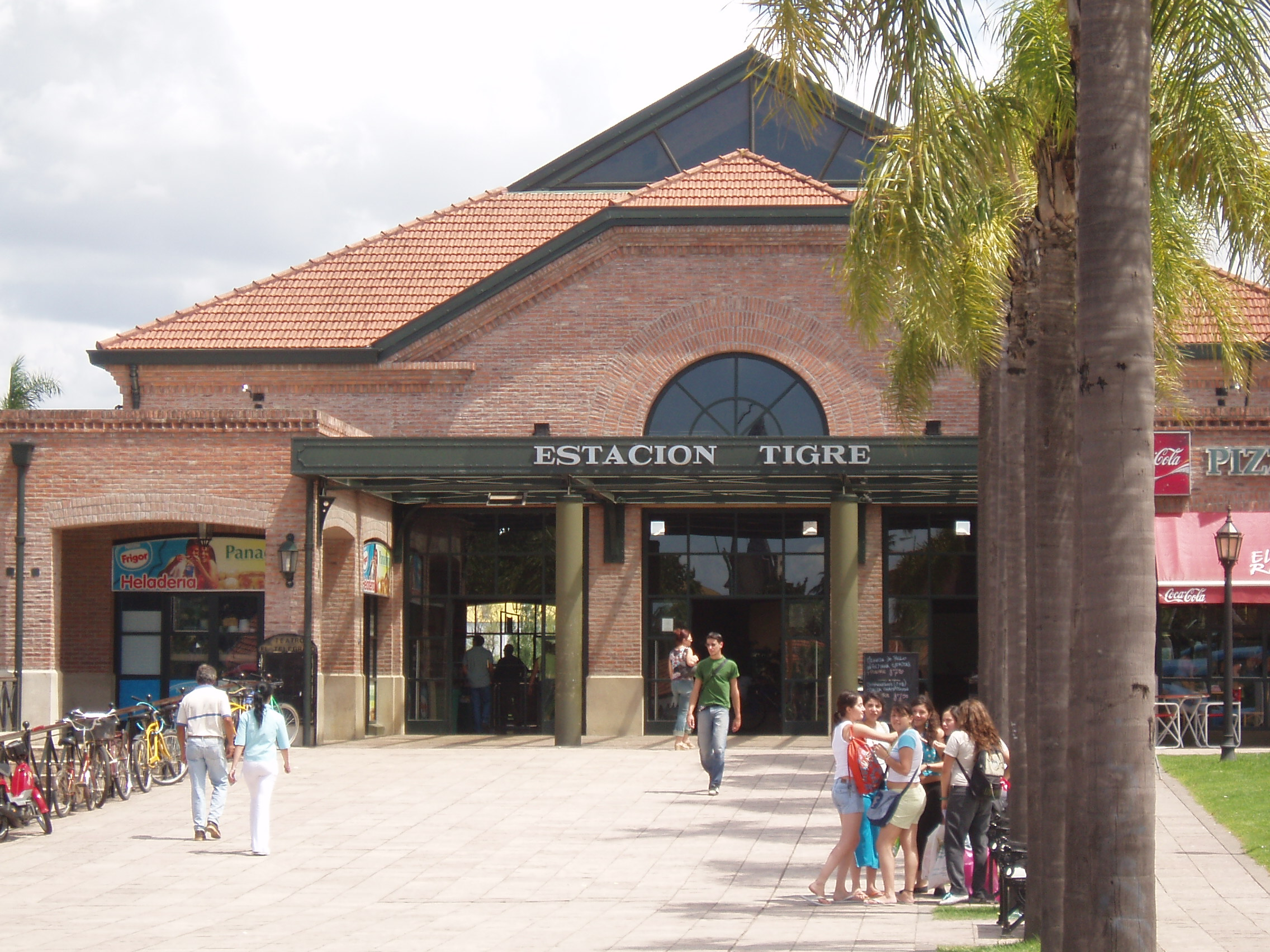
New Tigre station, opened in 1995

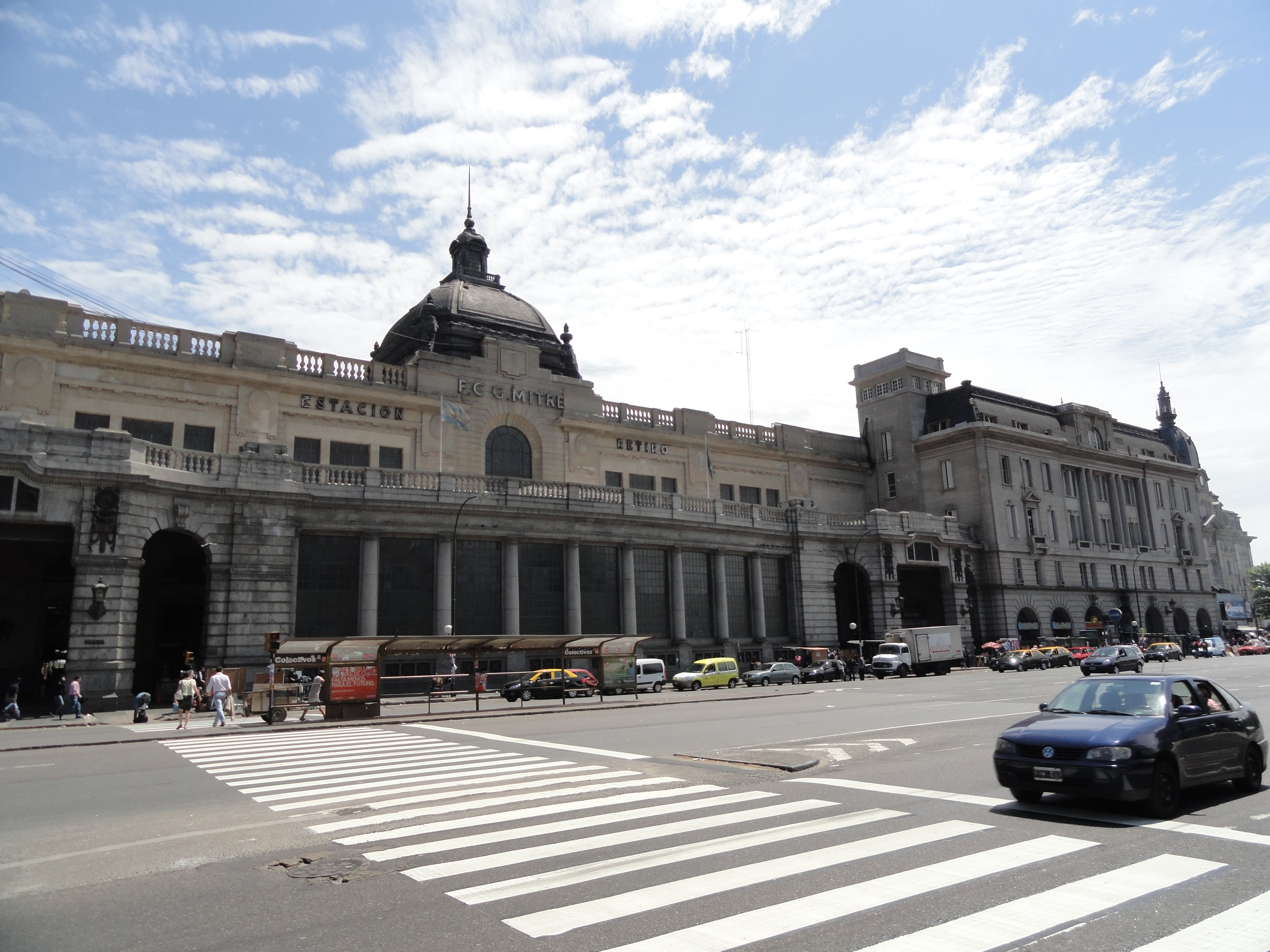
Facade of Retiro station

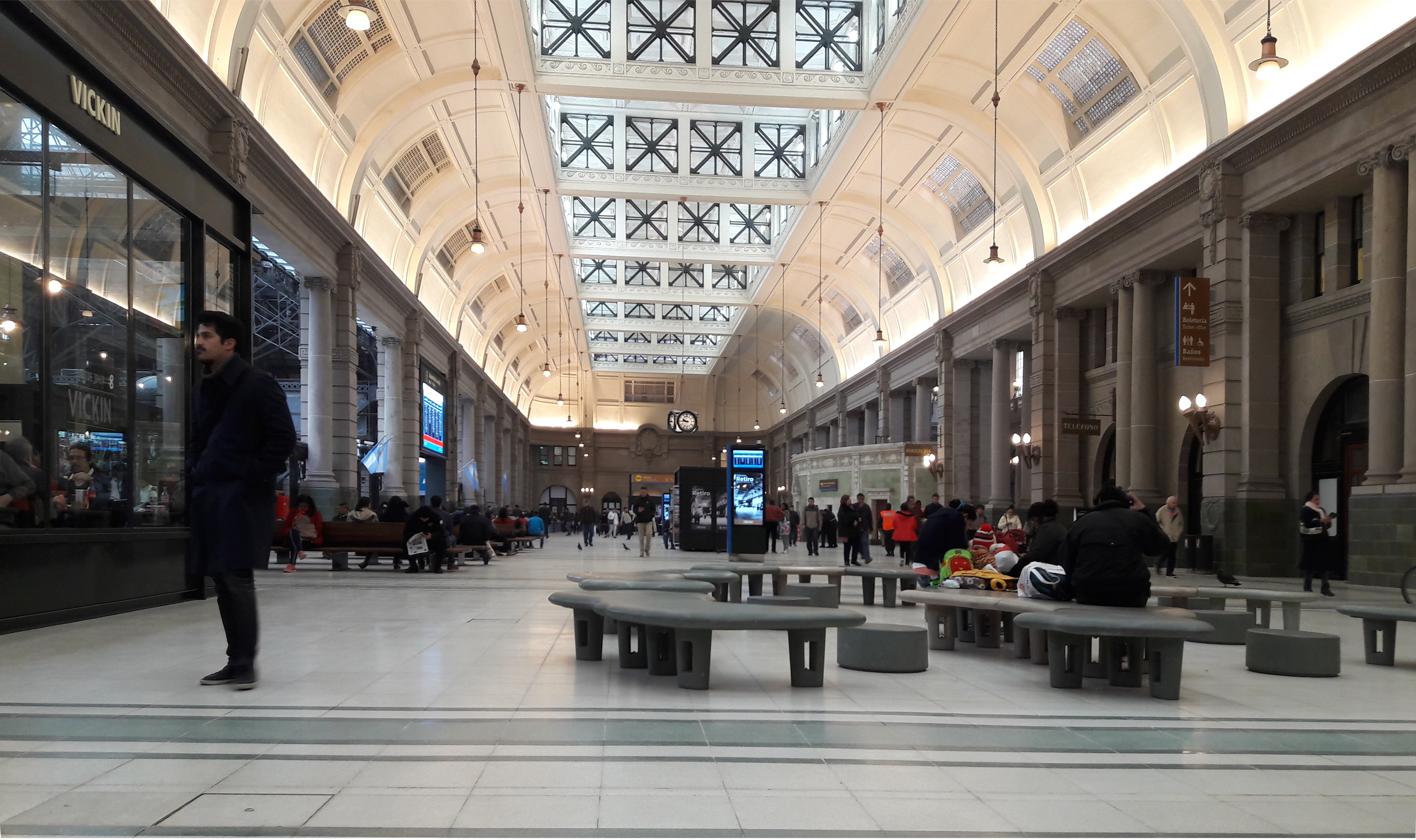
Interior of Retiro station

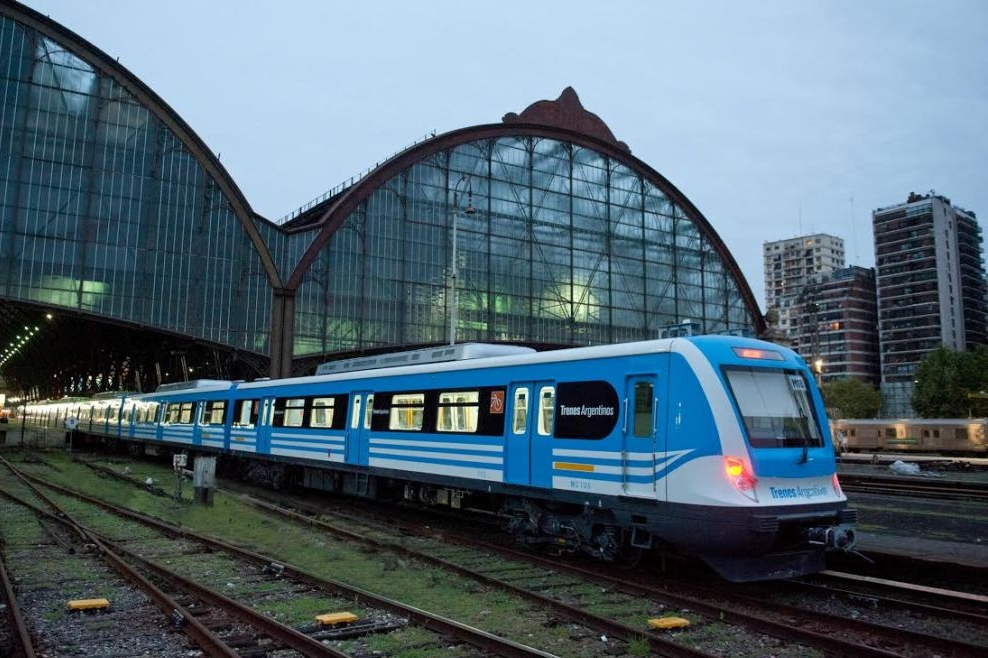
EMU arriving at Retiro

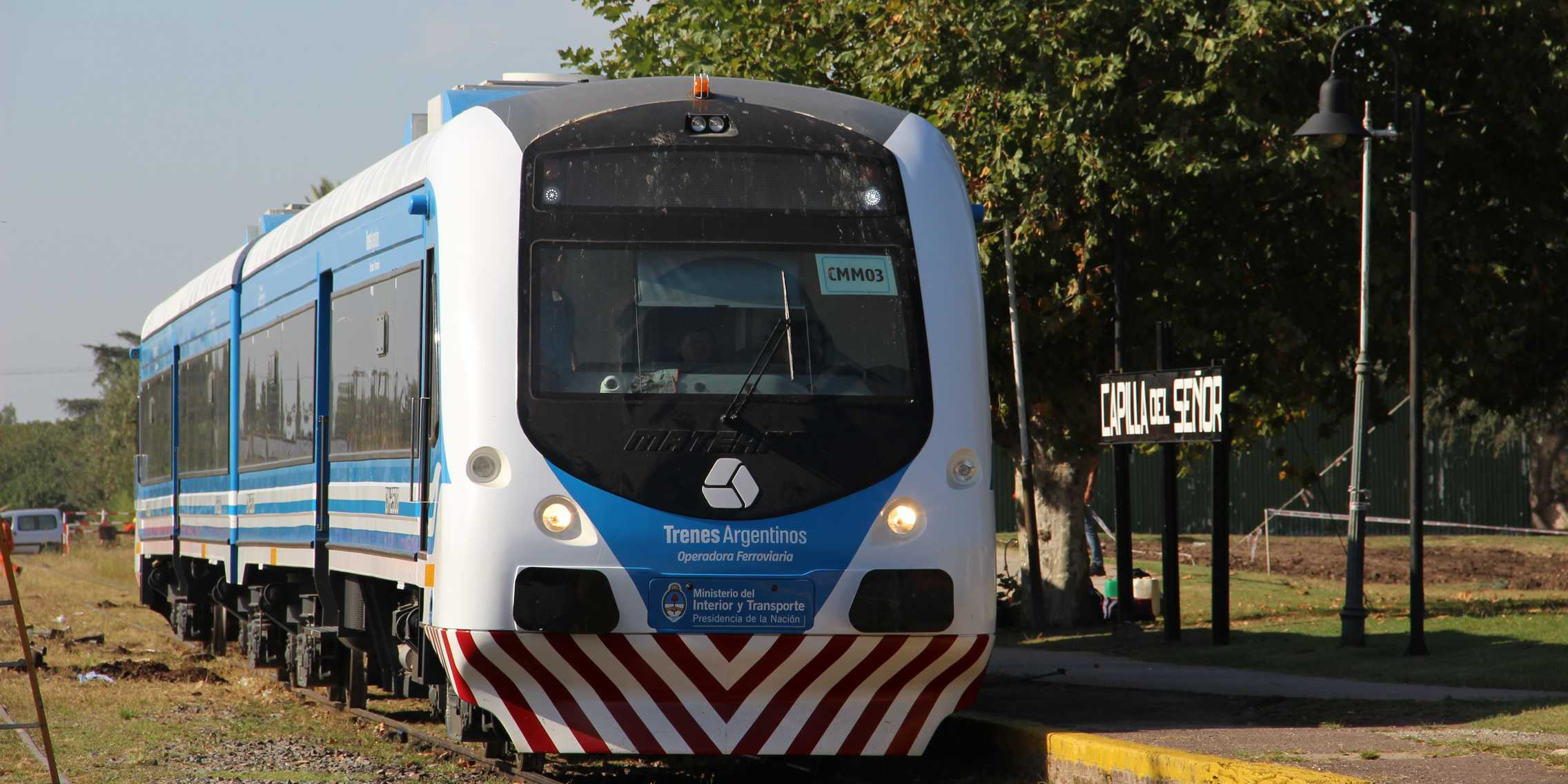
Materfer CMM 400-2 used for diesel services
