= Servicios Ferroviarios del Chaco =

Former Argentine State-owned railway company (1999–2010)

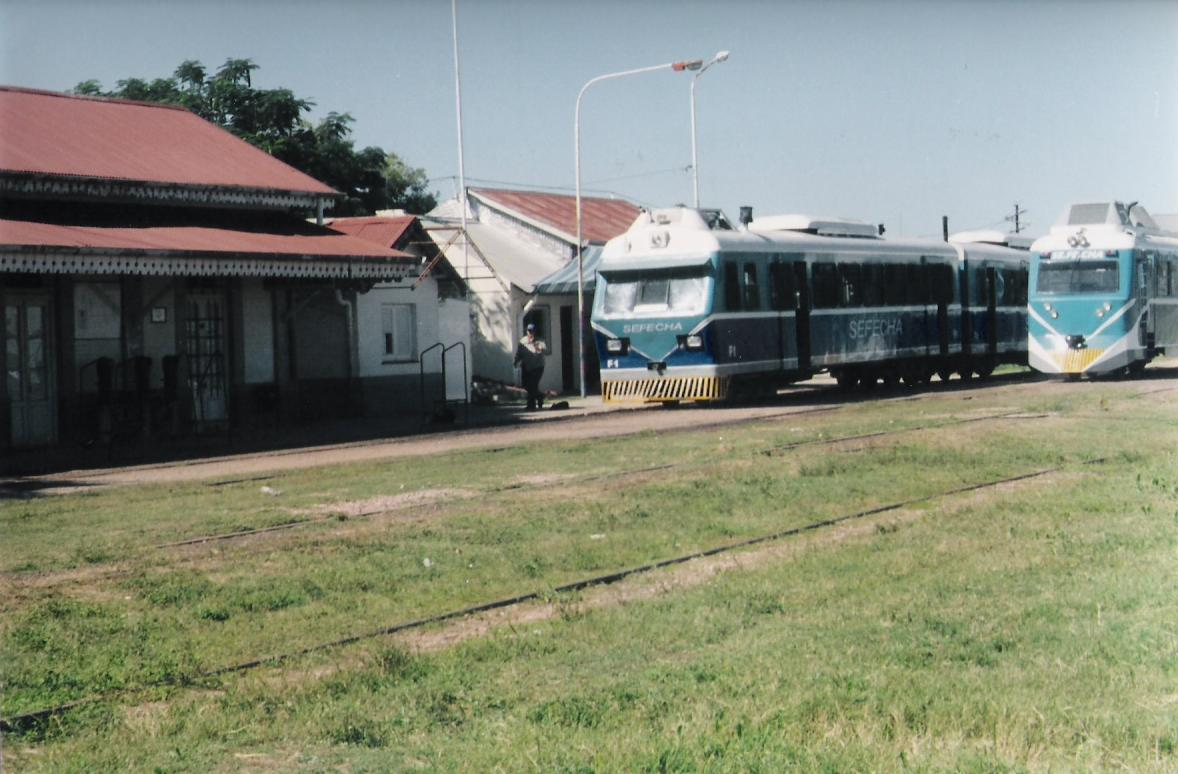
- Railcars operated by SEFECHA in Fontana station (2006).
- Company type: S.A.
- Industry: Railway
- Founded: 1997
- Founder: Government of Chaco Province
- Defunct: 2010; 16 years ago
- Successor: Trenes Argentinos
- Headquarters: Comandante Fontana, Chaco, Argentina
- Area served: Chaco Province
- Services: Rail transport
- Owner: Government of Chaco

Servicios Ferroviarios del Chaco S.A. (also known for its acronym SEFECHA) (in English: "Chaco Railway Services") was a State-owned railway company which operated passenger rail services in the Chaco Province of Argentina.

These services had previously been run by the state-owned company Ferrocarriles Argentinos since railway nationalization in 1948.

== History ==
As part of railway privatisation carried out during the presidency of Carlos Menem, a concession to operate the services was granted to the government of Chaco Province in 1992, being later transferred to "Servicios Ferroviarios del Chaco" (also known for its acronym "SEFECHA") which started operations in 1997.

The Government of Chaco carried out a plan to rehabilitate some branches within the Province, the first being the Cacuí-La Sabana line, which was re-opened in December 1997 running railcars by German company MAN.

In March 1998, another service was added, the Sáenz Peña-Taco Pozo line, with 3 trains a week. The 319 km route covered the north of Santiago del Estero Province. That same year SEFECHA re-opened the 190 km long Sáenz Peña-Chorotis branch.

The Cacuí-Resistencia-Barranqueras line (which service was named Metropolitano) was re-established in August 1999, using re-modeled Ferrostaal railcars.

In May 2010, the Government of Argentina took over services previously operated by SEFECHA, which was dissolved. These services, together with those of Tren de las Sierras in Córdoba Province, are the only ex-General Manuel Belgrano Railway passenger services in the interior of the country that are still in operation.

== Services ==
Two 1,000 mm (3 ft 3 3/8 in) metre gauge services were run by SEFECHA until 2010:

Province/s	Cities run	Dist./Km.	Rolling stock	Original company
Chaco, Santa Fe	Resistencia – Los Amores	153	MAN	Provincial de Santa Fe
Chaco	Roque Sáenz Peña – Chorotis	185	Ferrostaal	Central Norte

== See also ==
- Ferrocarril Belgrano
- Trenes Argentinos
