= Corredores Ferroviarios =

Former Argentine railway company (2014–2015)

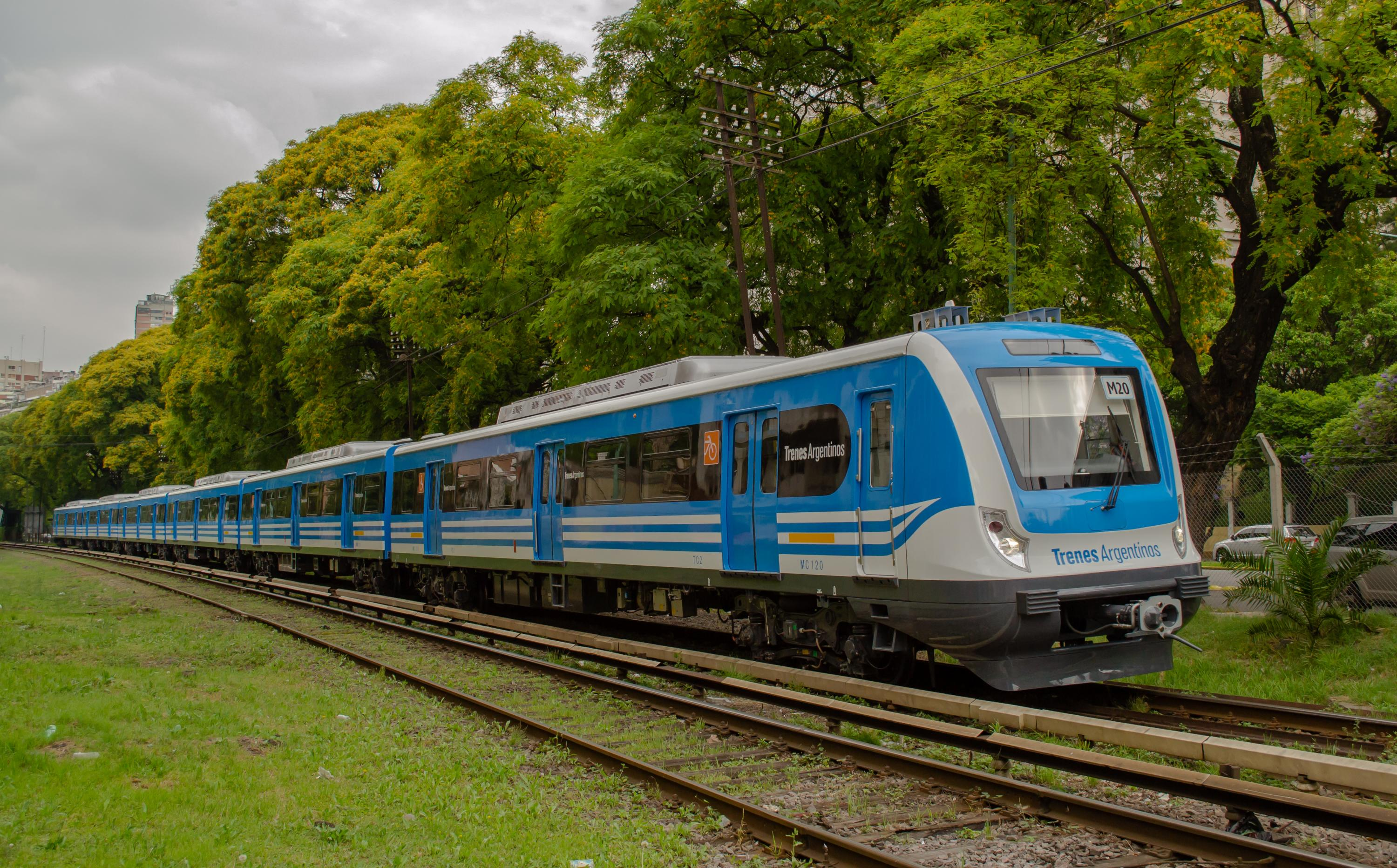
- A CSR electric train in Mitre Line.
- Company type: Private
- Industry: Railway
- Predecessor: List: TBA (Mitre) (Note: Only private companies are listed. State-owned companies that operated the Mitre and San Martín lines were Ferrocarriles Argentinos (1948-91) and FEMESA (1991-94).) (1994-2012); UGOMS (Mitre) (2012-14); Metropolitano (San Martín) (1994-2004); UGOFE (San Martín) (2005-14)
- Founded: 2014
- Defunct: March 2, 2015; 10 years ago
- Successor: Trenes Argentinos
- Headquarters: Buenos Aires, Argentina
- Area served: Buenos Aires Province
- Services: Passenger trains
- Owner: Grupo Roggio

Corredores Ferroviarios was an Argentine private company that operated the Mitre and San Martín railway services in Buenos Aires Province for about one year until the Government of Argentina rescinded the agreement with the company in March 2015. Since then, the Mitre and San Martín line are operated by State-owned company Operadora Ferroviaria Sociedad del Estado (SOFSE).

The company also ran long-distance services to the city of Rosario in Santa Fe Province, with a travel time of about 9 hours and 30 minutes.

== History ==
On May 24, 2012, the contract with TBA to operate the Mitre and Sarmiento lines was revoked by the Government of Argentina after the Once station rail disaster. As a result, UGOMS took over the Mitre Line until it was granted in concession. The San Martín Line was granted to UGOFE, a consortium formed by railway companies Ferrovías, Metrovías and TBA, although TBA would be excluded from it a few days later.

On February 12, 2014, the Government of Argentina announced that some companies would take over the lines operated by UGOFE, that was officially dissolved.

Emepa Group also owned Ferrocentral, a railway company formed with Nuevo Central Argentino to run passenger services to Rosario, Tucumán and Córdoba cities of Argentina. The company was dissolved in November 2014, when the National Government took over the services, since then operated by SOFSE.

When UGOFE was dissolved, Corredores Ferroviarios (a company part of Grupo Roggio, which also owns Metrovías, the operator of Buenos Aires Subte and Urquiza Line since 1994) took over the Mitre / San Martín lines.

In April 2014, brand new diesel multiple unit trains by Chinese company CSR were acquired by the National Government to be run on the San Martín Line. The units had been bought in 2008 but they were unable to run so the stations had to modify their platforms for the new coaches. Once works were concluded, the Chinese trains made their debut in Argentina. A total of 17 trains with 7 wagons each were acquired to replace local trains by Materfer, a local manufacturer. The Materfer trains had been built in the 1960s and 1970s.

In November 2014, the Retiro-Tigre section of Mitre Line renewed its fleet of electric trains, adding a total of 12 brand new units for that service. The CSR trains replaced old Toshiba wagons that had been brought to Argentina in the 1960s for the Mitre and Sarmiento lines. The purchase cost $ 250 million, all paid by the National Government. The renovation of the rolling stock finished in February 2015 with the Retiro-B. Mitre branch.

On March 2, 2015, the Government of Argentina rescinded the contract with Corredores Ferroviarios through its state-owned company SOFSE. The contract with the company had been signed in February 2014, committing Corredores Ferroviarios to operate the Mitre and San Martín lines.

== Services operated ==
| Line | Connects | Type |
|---|---|---|
| Mitre | Retiro - Tigre | Electric |
| Mitre | Retiro - B. Mitre | Electric |
| Mitre | Retiro - José L. Suárez | Electric |
| Mitre | José L. Suárez - Zárate | Diesel |
| Mitre | Victoria - Capilla del Señor | Diesel |
| Mitre | Retiro - Rosario Norte | Diesel |
| San Martín | Retiro - Dr. Cabred | Diesel |
