= Chorotis =

Coordinates: 27°55′00″S 61°24′00″W

Chorotis is a town in Fray Justo Santa María del Oro Department of Chaco Province in Argentina. The large Campo del Cielo crater is nearby.

Chorotis has been served by train to Sáenz Peña provided by Servicios Ferroviarios del Chaco.
