= Unidad de Gestión Operativa Mitre Sarmiento =

Consortium of Argentine companies that operated Mitre and Sarmiento lines

Unidad de Gestión Operativa Mitre Sarmiento (UGOMS)
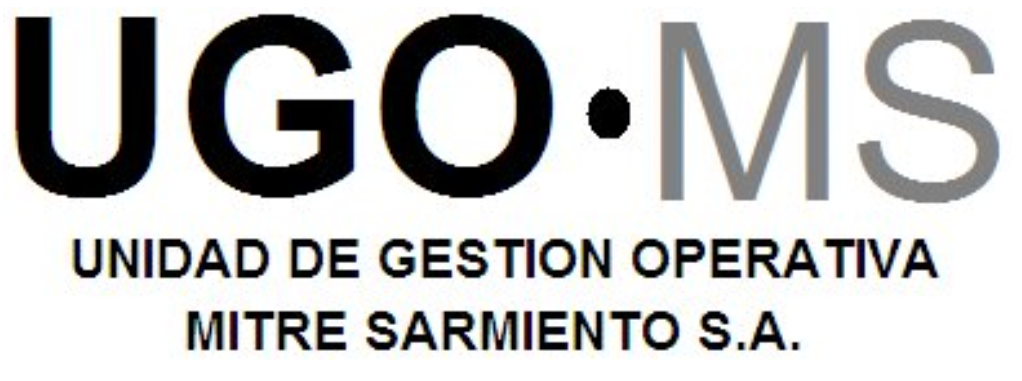

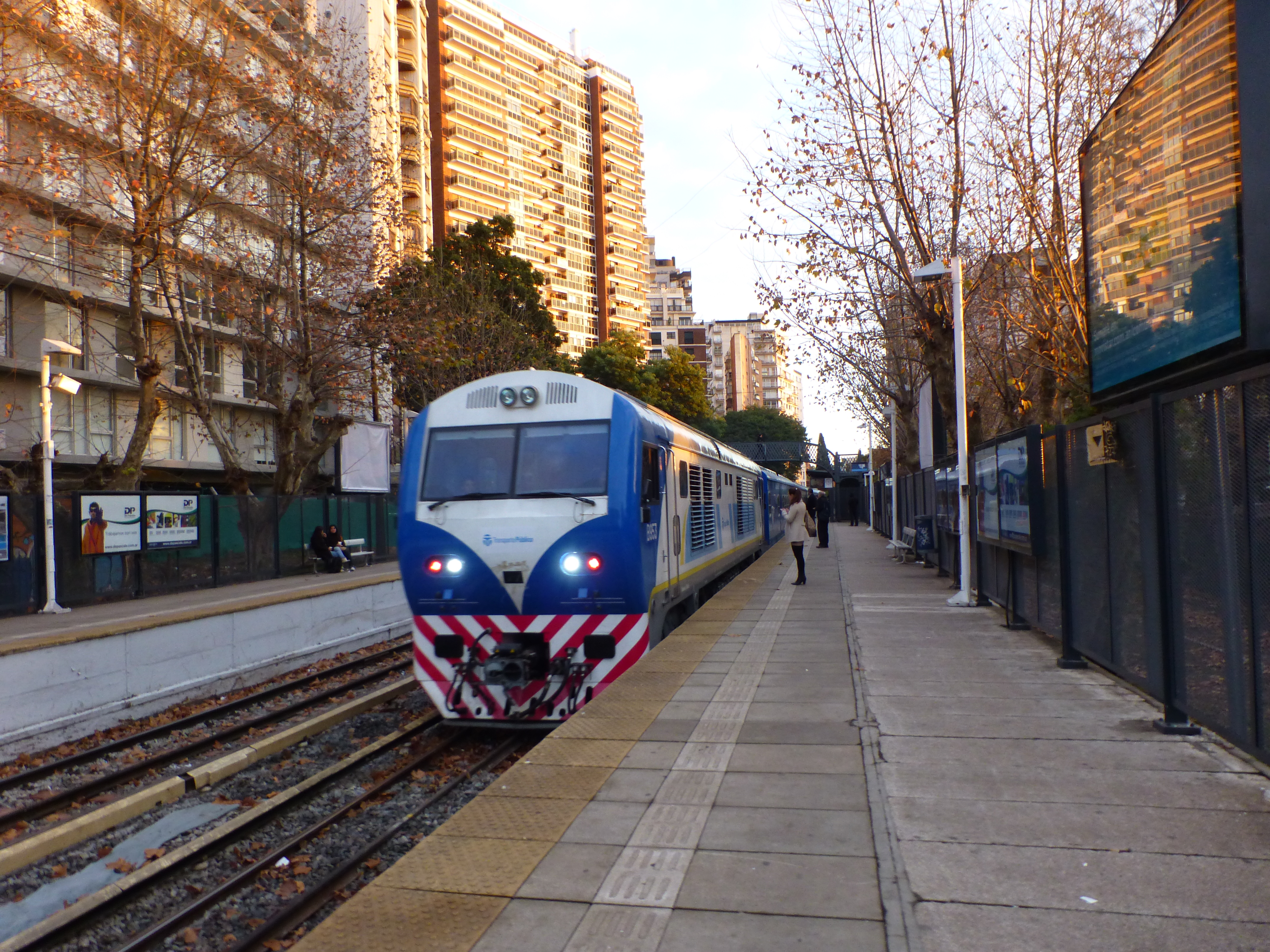
- A Mitre Line train while the service was operated by UGOMS
- Industry: Public transport
- Predecessor: Trenes de Buenos Aires
- Founded: 2012
- Founder: Government of Argentina
- Defunct: 2014
- Fate: Dissolved
- Successor: Corredores Ferroviarios; SOFSE
- Headquarters: Buenos Aires, Argentina
- Area served: Buenos Aires Province
- Services: Railway maintenance
- Parent: Ferrovías; Metrovías
- Divisions: Mitre Line; Sarmiento Line
- Website: Ugoms.com.ar (archive)

Unidad de Gestión Operativa Mitre-Sarmiento (UGOMS) was a temporary consortium of Argentine companies formed on 24 May 2012 by Ferrovías and Metrovías to take over the running of the Sarmiento and Mitre commuter rail lines, after concessions granted to Trenes de Buenos Aires (TBA) in 1995 for the operation of these services were revoked.

== History ==
Trenes de Buenos Aires, a company formed in 1995 to take over rail concessions granted by the Argentine government, as part of railway privatisation during the presidency of Carlos Menem, operated commuter rail services over Sarmiento and Mitre lines in Buenos Aires which had previously been run by state-owned companies since nationalisation of the railways in 1948. In spite of the large state subsidies received by the company a serious decline in the standard of its services, and fatal accidents (especially, the 2012 Buenos Aires rail disaster), led to the concession for both lines being revoked in 2012 through Decree N° 793/12, and to these services being taken over by the newly formed UGOMS.

In September 2013, Minister of Transport of Argentina, Florencio Randazzo, announced that Mitre and Sarmiento lines would be temporarily taken over by state organism SOFSE. SOFSE operated both lines until 12 February 2014, when they were given under concession to Corredores Ferroviarios. As a result, UGOMS and Unidad de Gestión Operativa Ferroviaria de Emergencia were dissolved. However both lines are now again operated by SOFSE following the renationalisation of the railways in Argentina.
