= Sarmiento Line =

Commuter rail service in Buenos Aires Province, Argentina

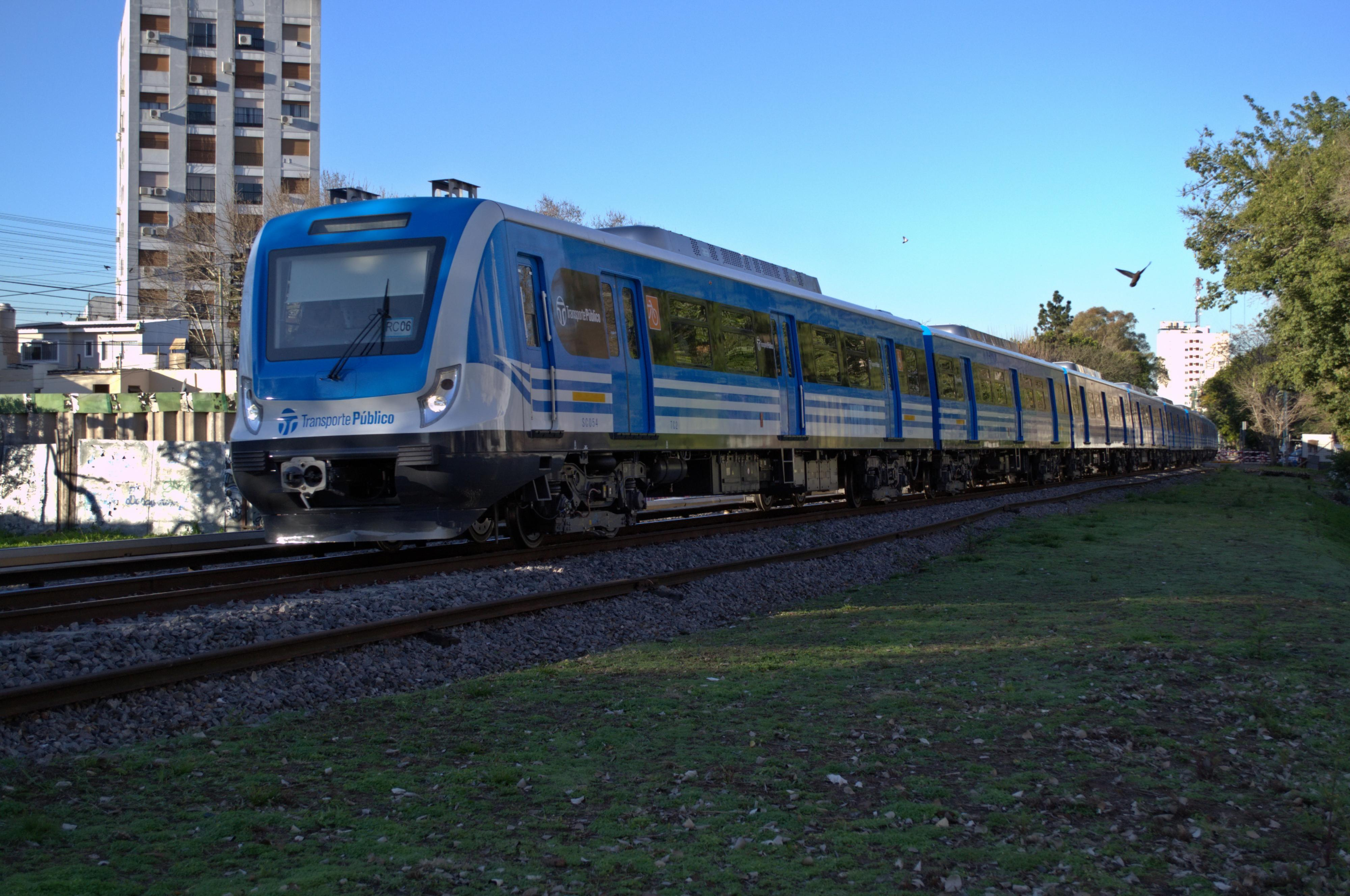
- A CSR electric multiple unit that runs the line.

Overview
- Service type: Commuter rail
- Status: Active
- Locale: Buenos Aires Province
- Predecessor: Buenos Aires Western Railway
- First service: 1948
- Current operator: Trenes Argentinos Operaciones
- Former operator: TBA
- Ridership: 53,005,152 (2019)
- Website: argentina.gob.ar/sarmiento

Route
- Termini: Once; Moreno; Lobos; Mercedes
- Stops: 40
- Distance travelled: 167 km (104 mi)
- Average journey time: Once–Moreno: 72 min.; Merlo–Lobos: 90 min.; Moreno–Mercedes: 130 min.
- Service frequency: Once–Moreno: 10 min.; Merlo–Lobos: 20 min.; Moreno–Mercedes: 150 min.

Technical
- Rolling stock: CSR EMUs
- Track gauge: 1,676 mm (5 ft 6 in)
- Electrification: Third rail, 800 V DC
- Track owner: Government of Argentina

The Sarmiento line is a broad gauge commuter rail service in Buenos Aires Province, Argentina, run by the state-owned Trenes Argentinos since 11 September 2013.

The line is part of Domingo Sarmiento Railway, running trains departing from Once de Septiembre station in the Balvanera neighborhood of Buenos Aires to the cities of Moreno, Lobos, and Mercedes in Buenos Aires Province. The 167-km long line has 40 stations. As of 2018, a total of 101,453 services had been run, with 85,946,312 passengers carried.

== History ==
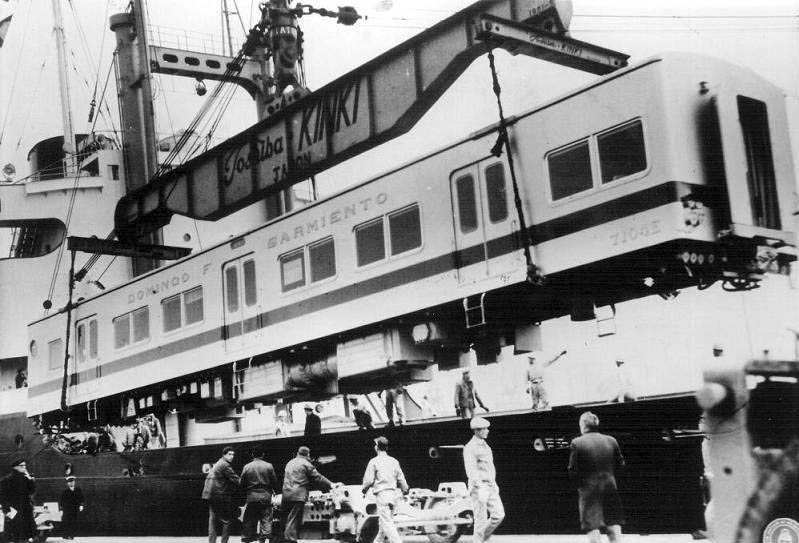
Toshiba EMU at the port of Buenos Aires in 1961

Since nationalisation of the Argentine railways in 1948, the line was run by state-owned company Ferrocarriles Argentinos. In 1961, the old wooden coaches (that had debuted when the service was electrified in 1923) were replaced by Toshiba multiple units, that would run on the line for more than 50 years.

FA operated the trains until 1991 when residual company FEMESA temporarily took over all the urban services prior to be privatized. After the Government of Carlos Menem privatized the urban railways services, consortium Trenes de Buenos Aires (TBA) took over the Sarmiento and Mitre lines.

TBA operated the line until the 2012 Once station rail disaster happened. As a result, the National Government revoked the concession granted to TBA and gave the Mitre and Sarmiento to UGOMS, that operated the line until 2014 when it was re-privatised and given under concession to "Corredores Ferroviarios S.A."

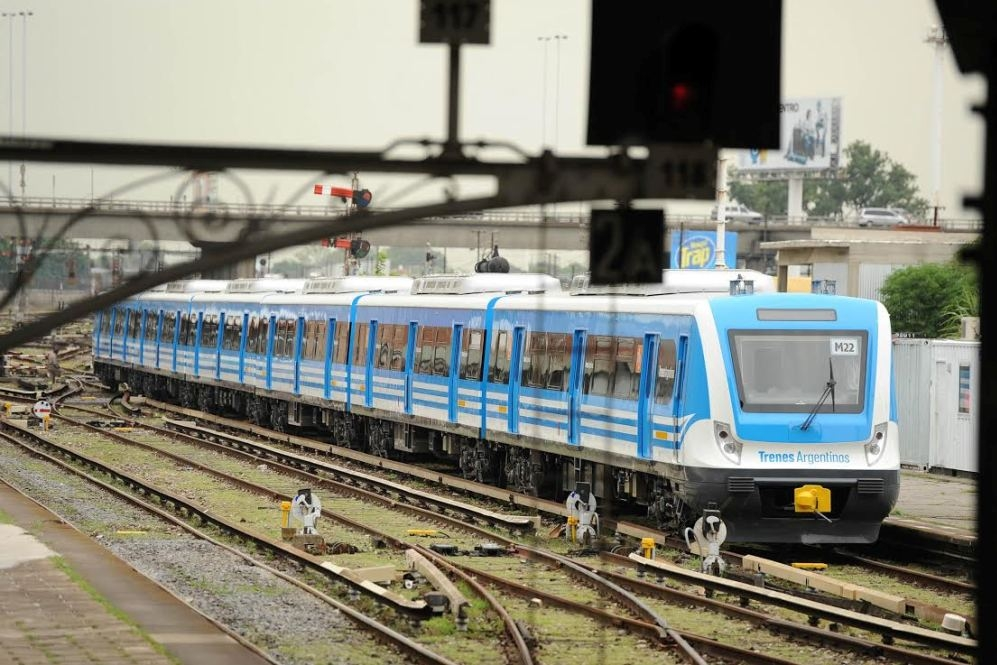
CSR EMU replaced Toshiba units in 2014

In 2014 the Government announced the acquisition of new trains to replace the existing Sarmiento Line rolling stock. The cars were manufactured by Chinese company CSR Corporation, with the first arriving in June 2014. The incorporation of the rolling stock was also accompanied by the replacement of rails between Once and Moreno.

During 2015 a series of improvement works were conducted and completed on the line. These included remodelling stations, new signaling and other infrastructure improvements such as replacing track and third rail segments, as well as the refurbishing of workshops. The works, which also included the installation of a communications-based train control system, meant that the line was closed on Sundays from February to June of that year on its electrified segment, with replacement bus services operating during that time.

In 2021 transport minister Alexis Guerrera decided not to renew the freight concession with freight operation transferred to Argentinean Trains Cargo.

=== Tunnels ===
The line has two underground segments not currently in use for passenger services. The first of these is an underground station within the Plaza Miserere Buenos Aires Underground station, which formerly provided a direct connection with Line A alongside its platforms, rather than passengers transferring from Once railway station to the line using underground passages. In May 2014, this connection was being restored with tracks replaced in order to restore the line's service to the Underground.

The second is a tunnel which runs directly from Once railway station to Puerto Madero in the centre of the city. Nowadays it is only used for freight to the Port of Buenos Aires, being operated by private company Ferrosur Roca; however, it was briefly used for passenger services in the 1990s. The tunnel is around 5 km (3.1 mi) long and runs through the middle of the city below Line A. Construction of the tunnel had been initiated by the Buenos Aires Western Railway in 1912; however, it was not completed until 1916 due to delays caused by the First World War. As of November 2015, Trenes Argentinos Operaciones was replacing pipes in the Puerto Madero tunnel with no plan of reopening it for passenger services.

=== Historic operators ===
Companies that have operated the Sarmiento Line since it was established after the 1948 nationalisation are:

Operator	Period
Ferrocarriles Argentinos	1948–1991
FEMESA	1991–1995
Trenes de Buenos Aires	1995–2012
UGOMS	2012–2013
SOFSE	2013–2014
Corredores Ferroviarios	2014–2015
Trenes Argentinos	2015–pres.

== Sarmiento tunnelling ==
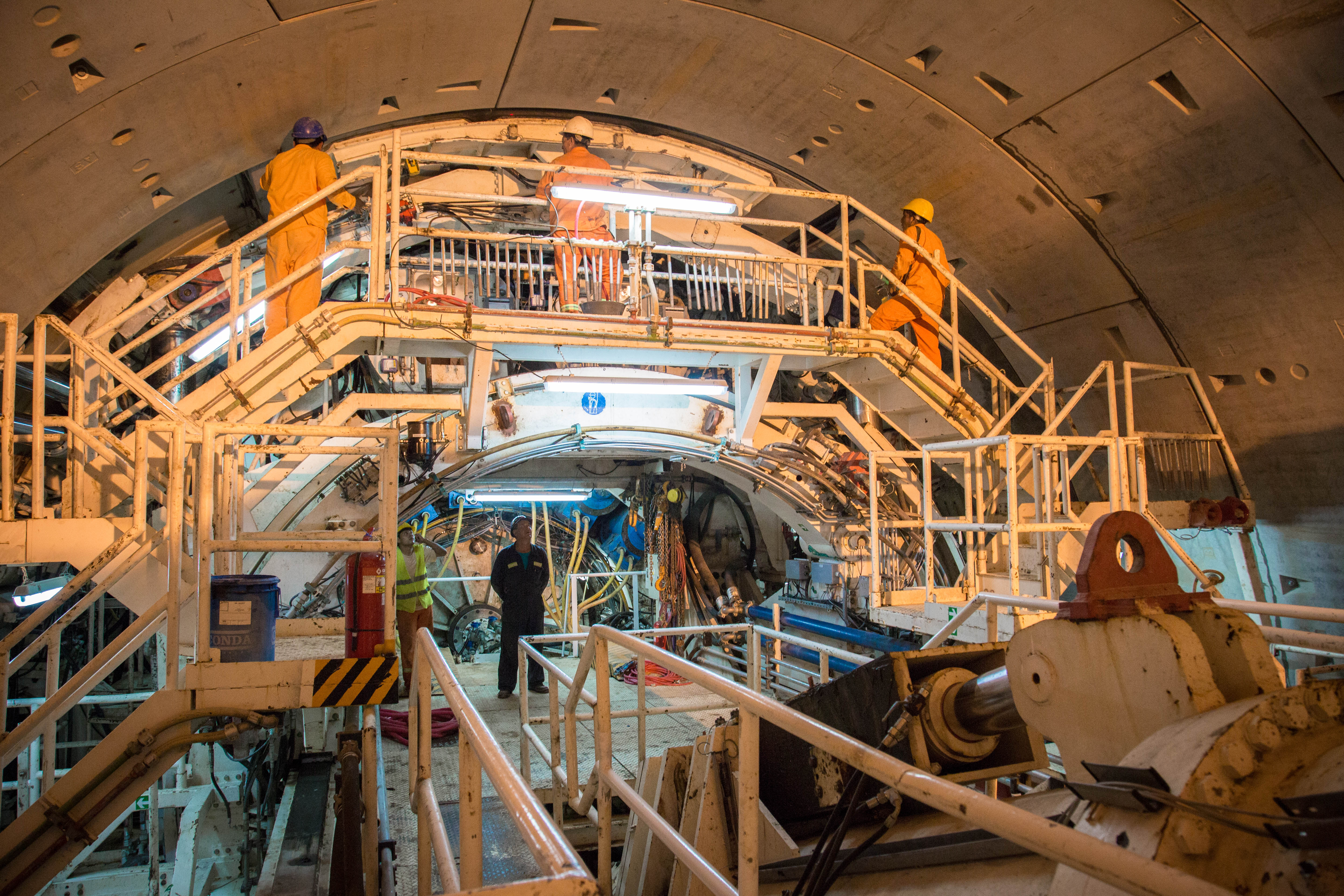
Works at the Sarmiento line tunnel in November 2016

The performance of the Sarmiento line was to be greatly improved by drilling a new tunnel. Under plans announced in 2006, a 33 km tunnel would be bored between Moreno and Caballito in order to replace the surface alignment of the Sarmiento commuter route. According to the Minister of the Interior and Transport, the first stage was to cost 11·5bn pesos, removing many level crossings which would "avoid many accidents and much loss of life". The new underground alignment would increase the service frequency to every 3 minutes, increasing capacity from 100 million to 280 million passenger-journeys a year. The tunnel segment would have 13 underground stations.

Drilling took place for a few months in 2012, was suspended, resumed in 2016, had at Villa Lugo on 25 February 2019 the hole-through and was suspended again few months later in July due to lack of funds. As of January 2020 the government was studying its options regarding contract cancellation. During the construction, service on the surface line was continuing. On 18 August 2025 the government announced the final stoppage of the whole project and the closing of the already done tunnel with a length of about 7 kilometres.

== Train services ==
Start	End	Time	Type
Once	Moreno	72 min	Electric
Moreno	Mercedes	90 min	Diesel
Merlo	Lobos	130 min	Diesel

== Gallery ==
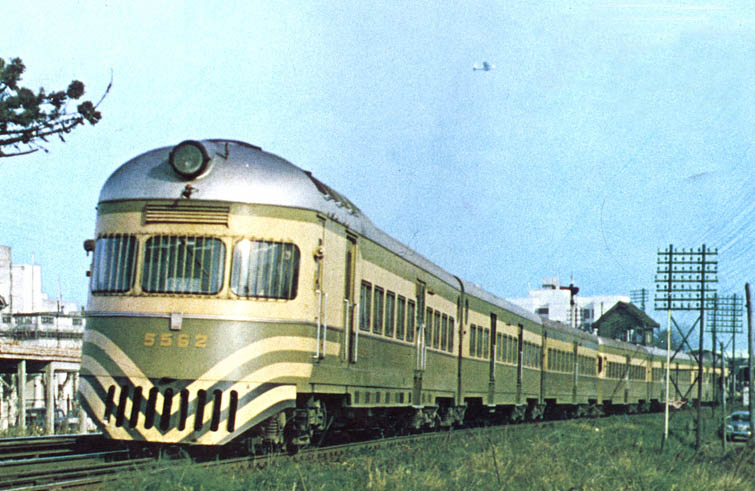
Fiat Materfer 7131 railcar, c. 1963

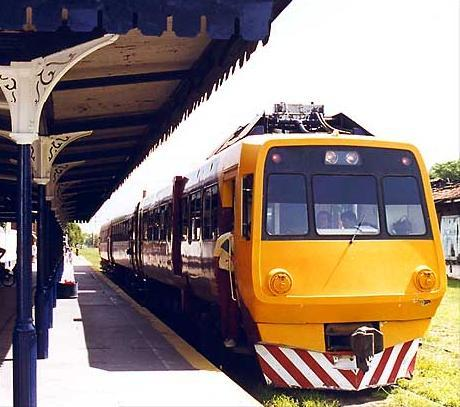
Materfer railcar in Lobos

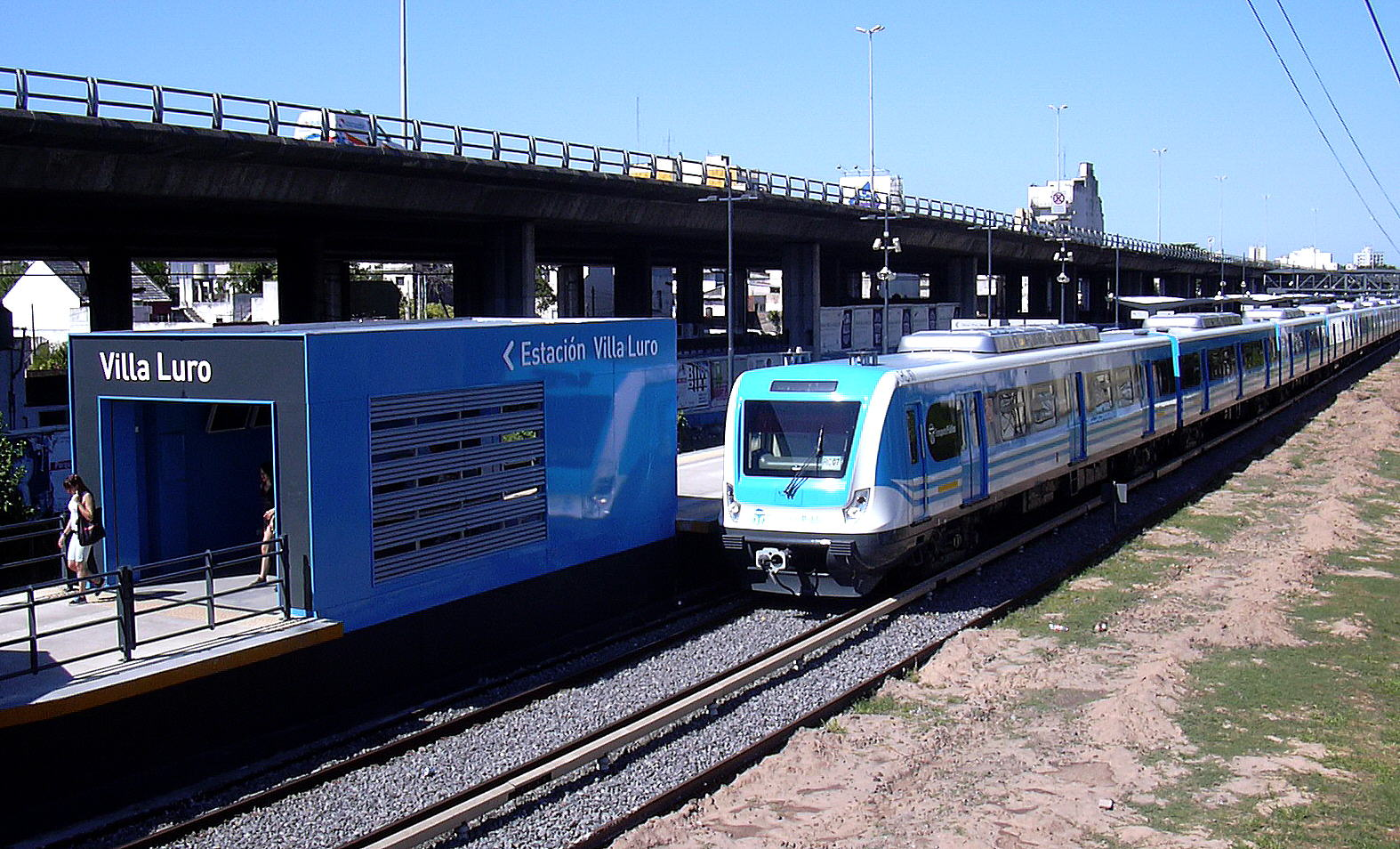
Villa Luro stations after being rebuilt

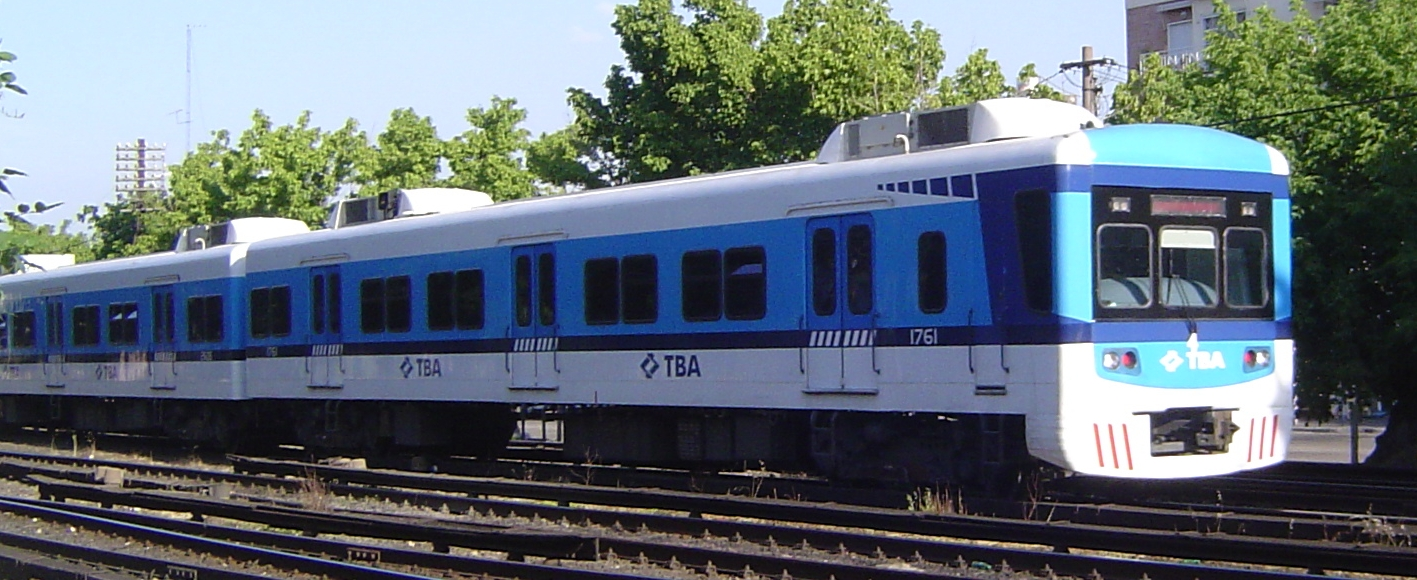
EMU called Toshiba PUMA-V2

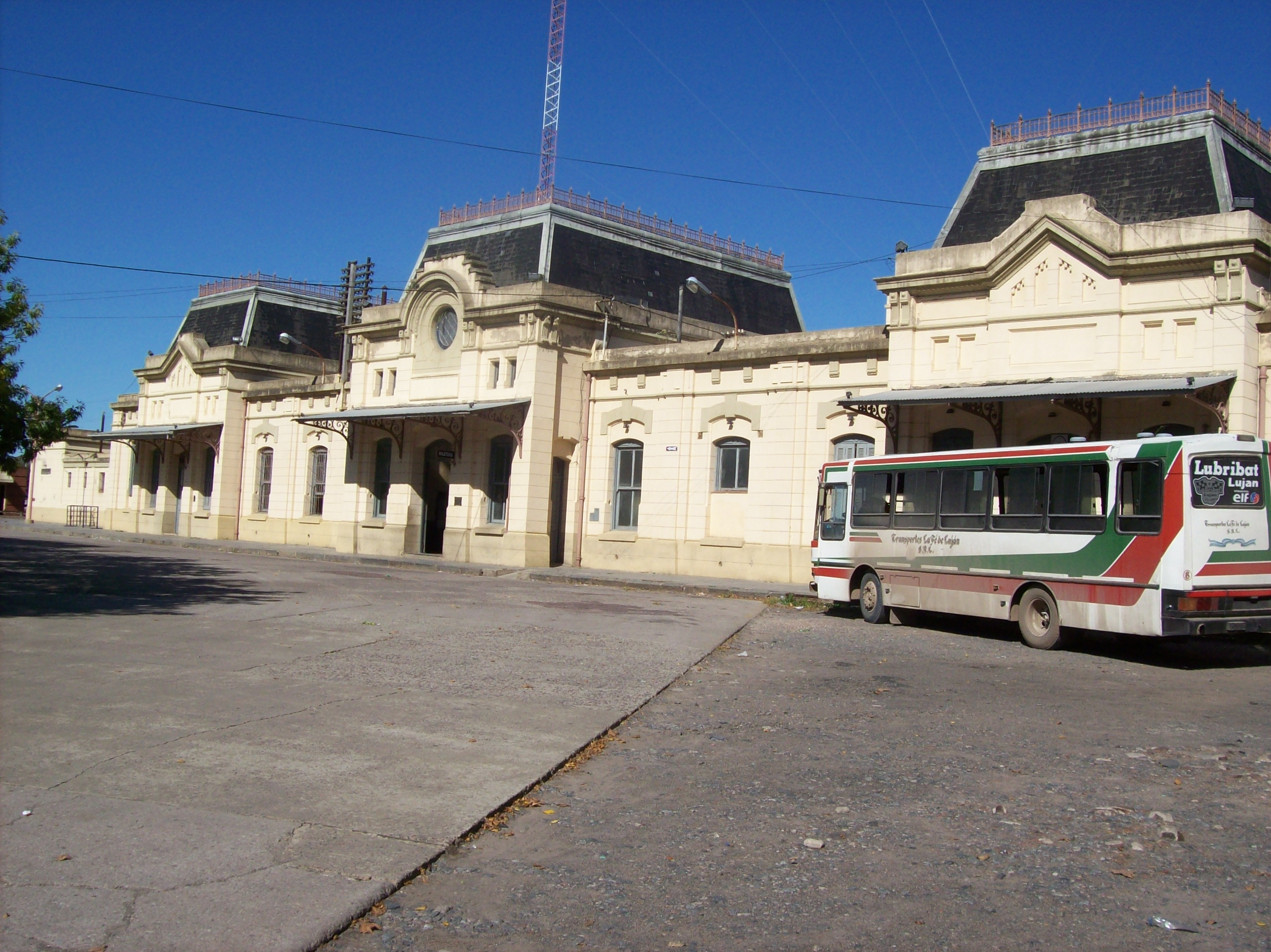
Luján station facade
