= Compañía General de Ferrocarriles en la Provincia de Buenos Aires =

Defunct railway company in Argentina

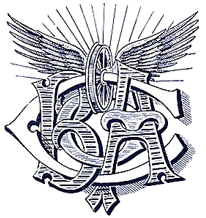

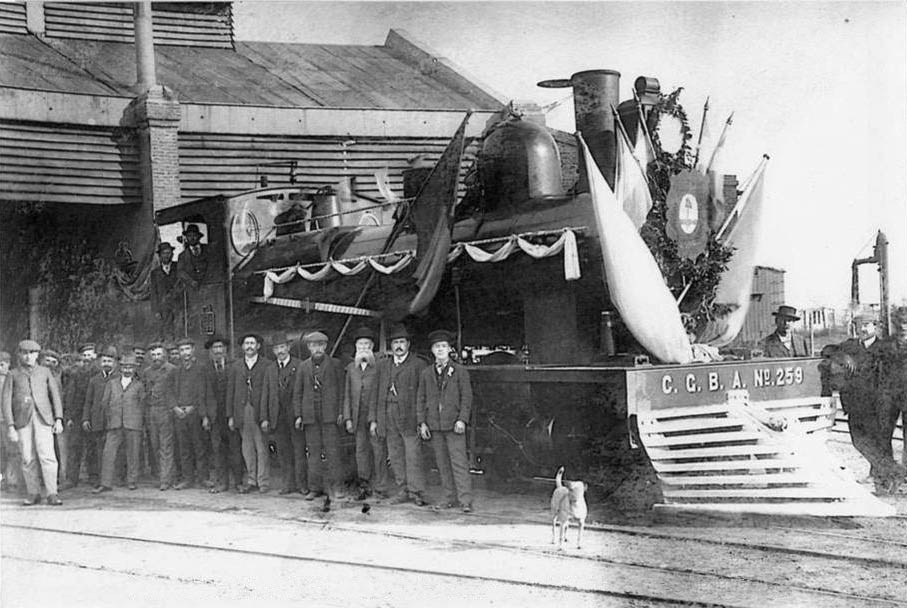
- Locomotive and workers in Rosario, 1918.

Overview
- Native name: Compagnie générale de chemins de fer dans la Province de Buenos Aires'
- Locale: Buenos Aires Province; Rosario
- Termini: Buenos Aires; List; Rosario; Port of La Plata; Vedia; Gral. Villegas; V. de la Plaza

Service
- Type: Inter-city
- Operator(s): Argentren (2015) (Note: After the closing of branches that started in 1961, only the Buenos Aires — González Catán branch is active as of Jan 2015.)

History
- Opened: 1908 (Note: The Buenos Aires — Rosario section was the first to be inaugurated.)
- Closed: 1948; 78 years ago

Technical
- Track gauge: 1,000 mm (3 ft 3 3/8 in)
Route map
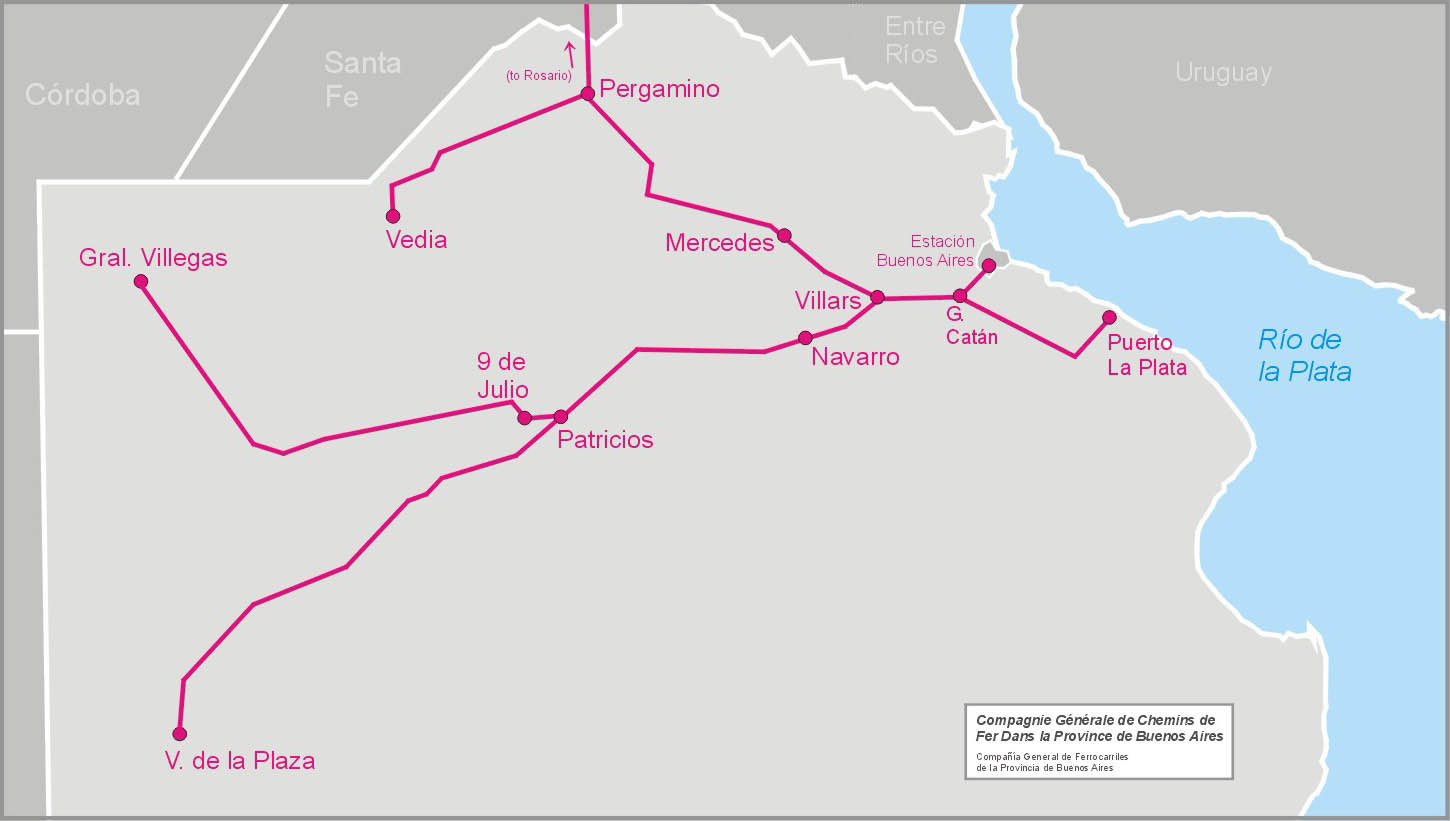

The Compañía General de Ferrocarriles en la Provincia de Buenos Aires (CGBA) (in French: "Compagnie générale de chemins de fer dans la Province de Buenos Aires") was a French–owned company, formed in 1904, which operated a metre-gauge railway network in Argentina.

== History ==
In 1904 the company took over a concession to build lines between the ports of Buenos Aires and Rosario, and to La Plata, together with other branch lines in the west and south of Buenos Aires Province. These lines were built as detailed below:

CGBA Progress
Section	Length (km)	Date Opened
Buenos Aires - Rosario	395	1908-01-25
Villars - 9 de Julio	202	1909-03-01
González Catán - Port of La Plata	88	1910-07-27
Pergamino - Vedia	122	1910-12-05
Patricios - Buenos Aires	224	1911-12-07
9 de Julio - General Villegas	232	1912-12-01

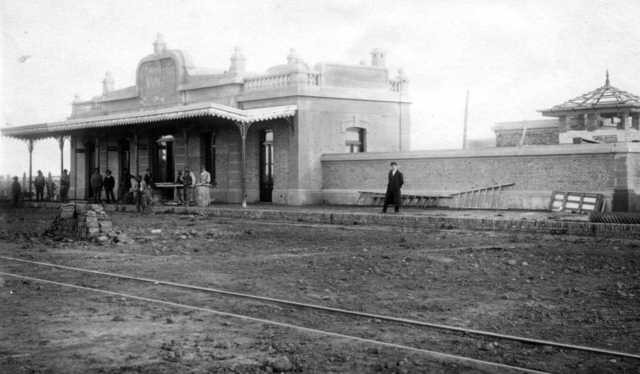
Buchanan train station, September 1910

The company always faced tough competition from the various large British-owned railway companies operating in the Province who had already built lines in those areas where most profit was to be made. As a result of this competition, plans to build a line between Buenos Aires and Bahía Blanca and other branch lines were abandoned.

When the Government of Juan Domingo Perón took over the railways in 1948, the CGBA became part of Ferrocarril Belgrano. In 1961 the Government of Arturo Illia decided to close all the lines that were running in loss and many branches were closed, such as the CGBA's G3 (to Port of La Plata), G4 (to General Villegas), G5 (to Victorino de la Plaza) and G6 (to Vedia).

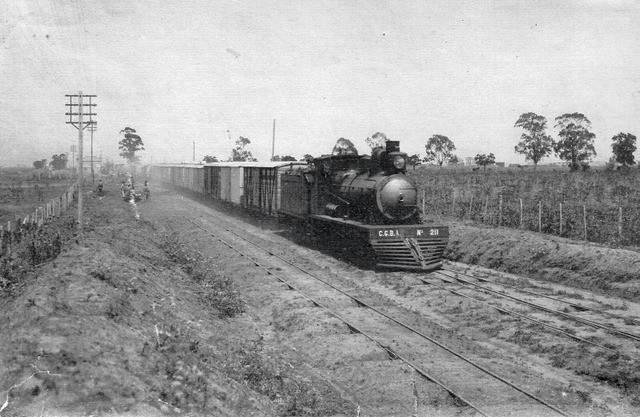
Freight train running, c. 1910s

Although some branches would be re-opened later, those reopenings were temporary, as most of them were finally closed in 1977 by the de facto government in power in Argentina at the time.

Of those branches, only G remained active but only to González Catán. During the railway privatisation in Argentina in 1992, the line was taken over by Metropolitano, that operated the line until the contract of concession was revoked by the Government of Argentina in 2007. As a result, the Buenos Aires-González Catán branch was operated by the consortium UGOFE until February 2014 when the whole Belgrano Sur Line was re-privatised and given in concession to private company "Argentren" of Emepa Group. UGOFE was therefore dissolved.

== Gallery ==
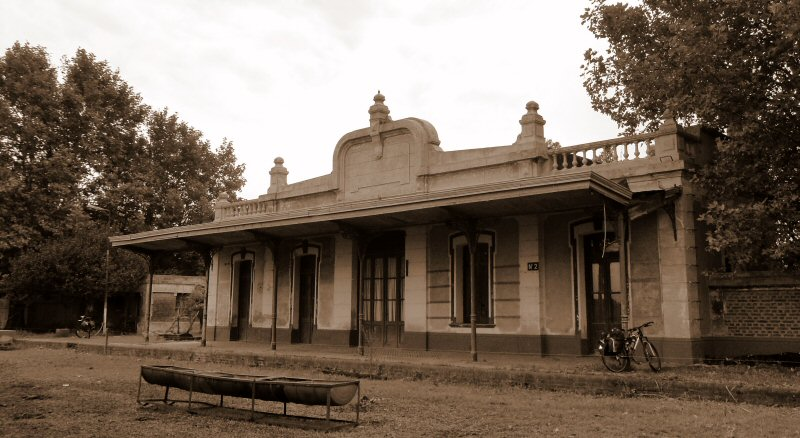
Las Marianas

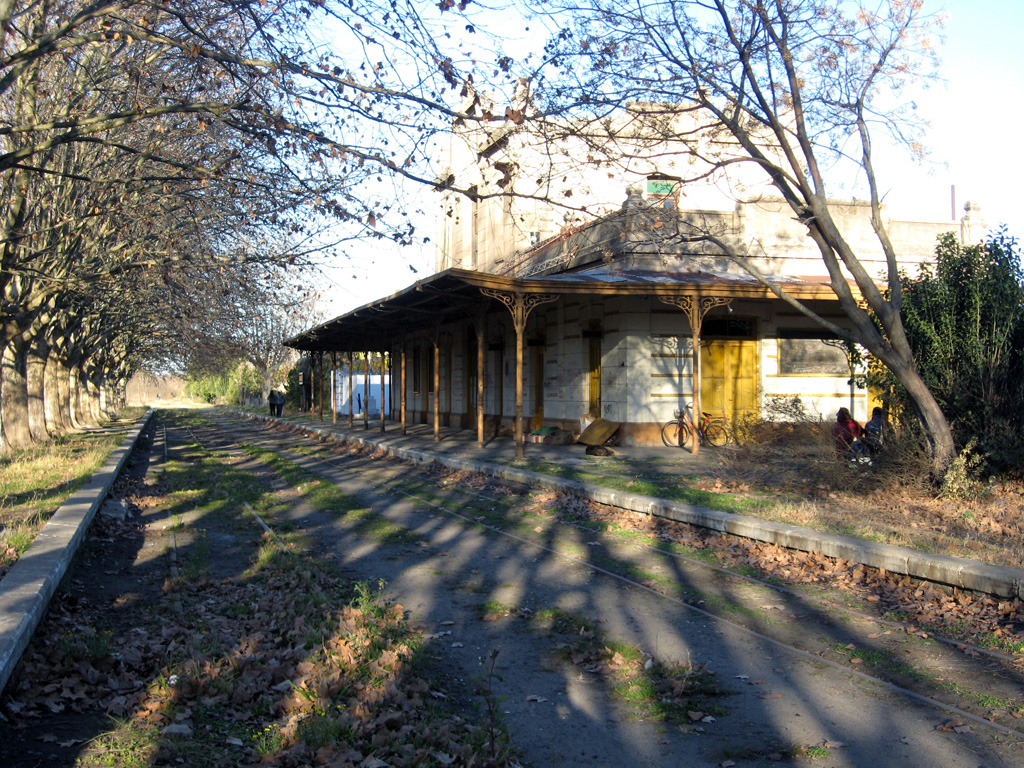
Mercedes platform

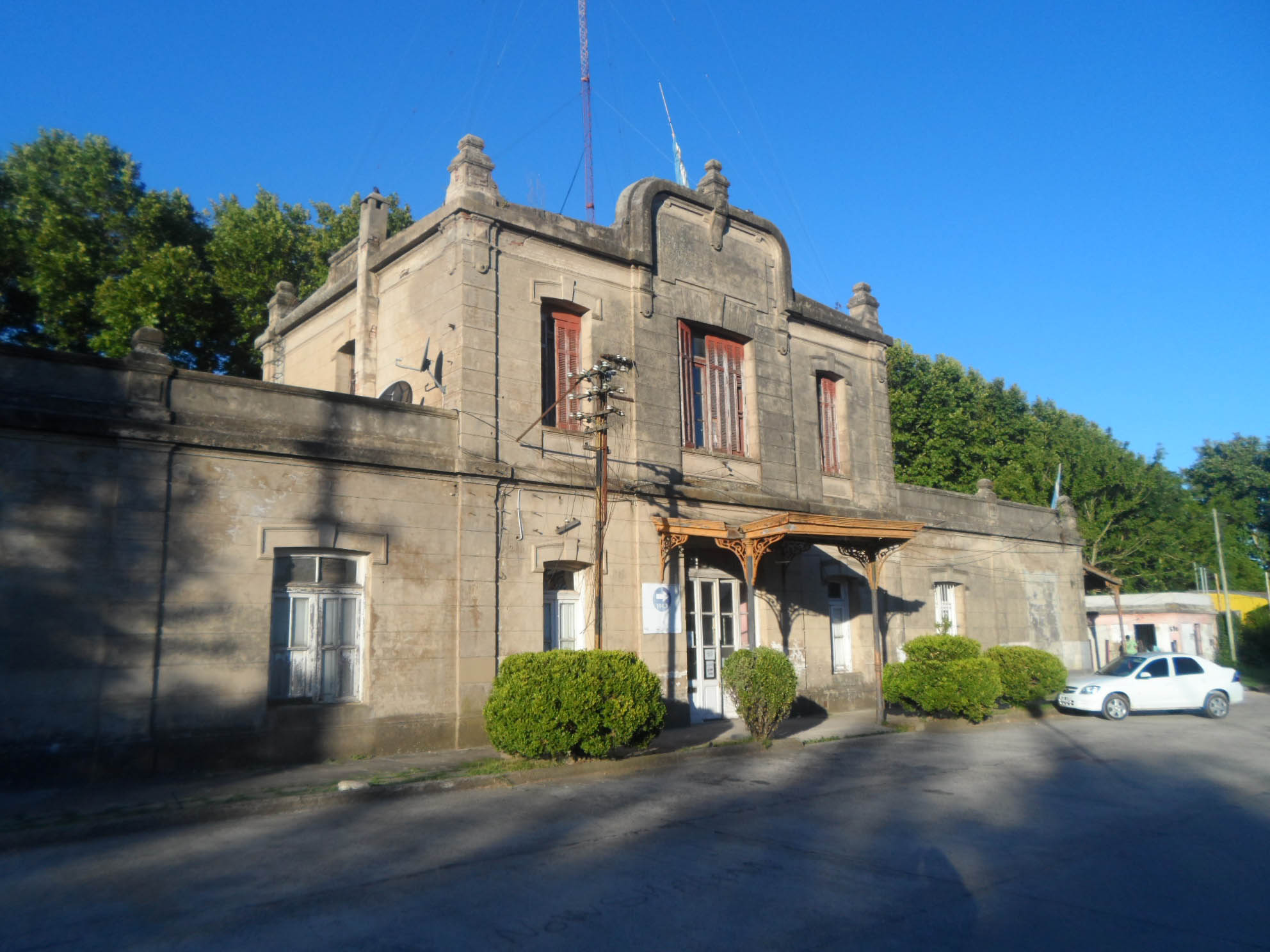
Mercedes building

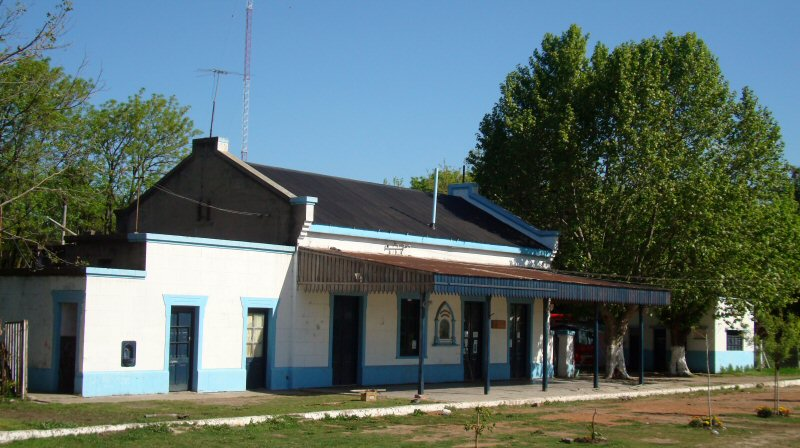
Angel Etcheverry

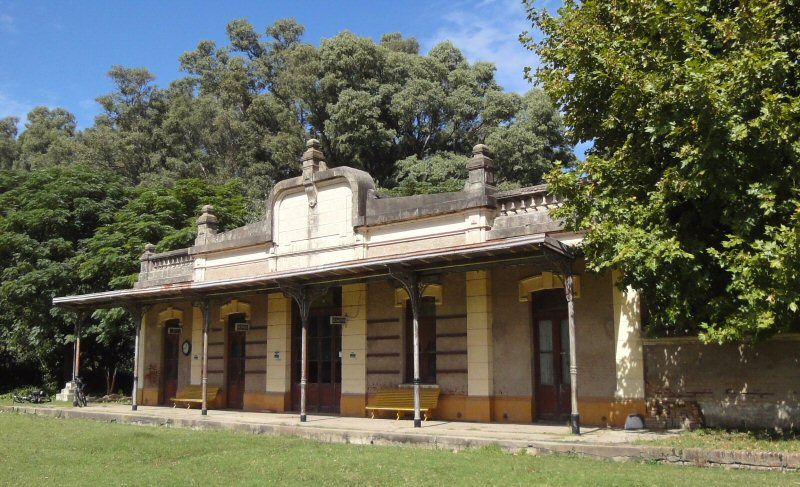
La Verde

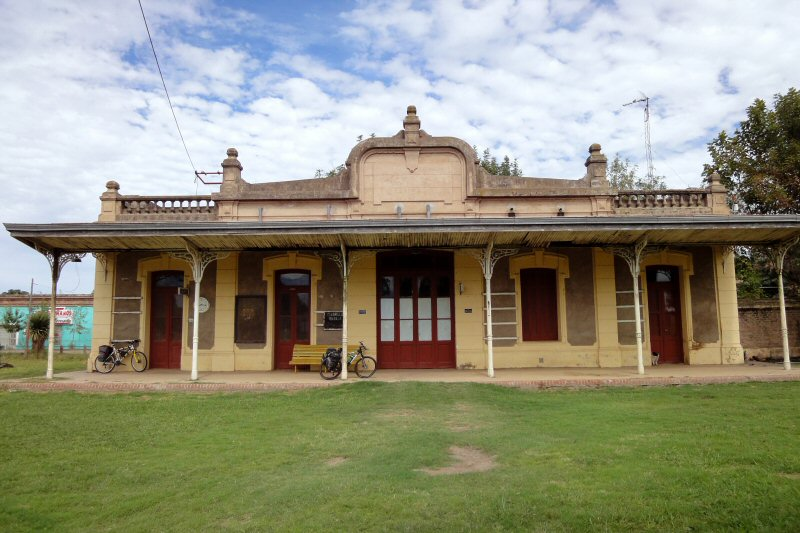
Moll

== See also ==
- Belgrano Sur Line
