= CNR diesel multiple unit =

Argentine diesel multiple unit trainset

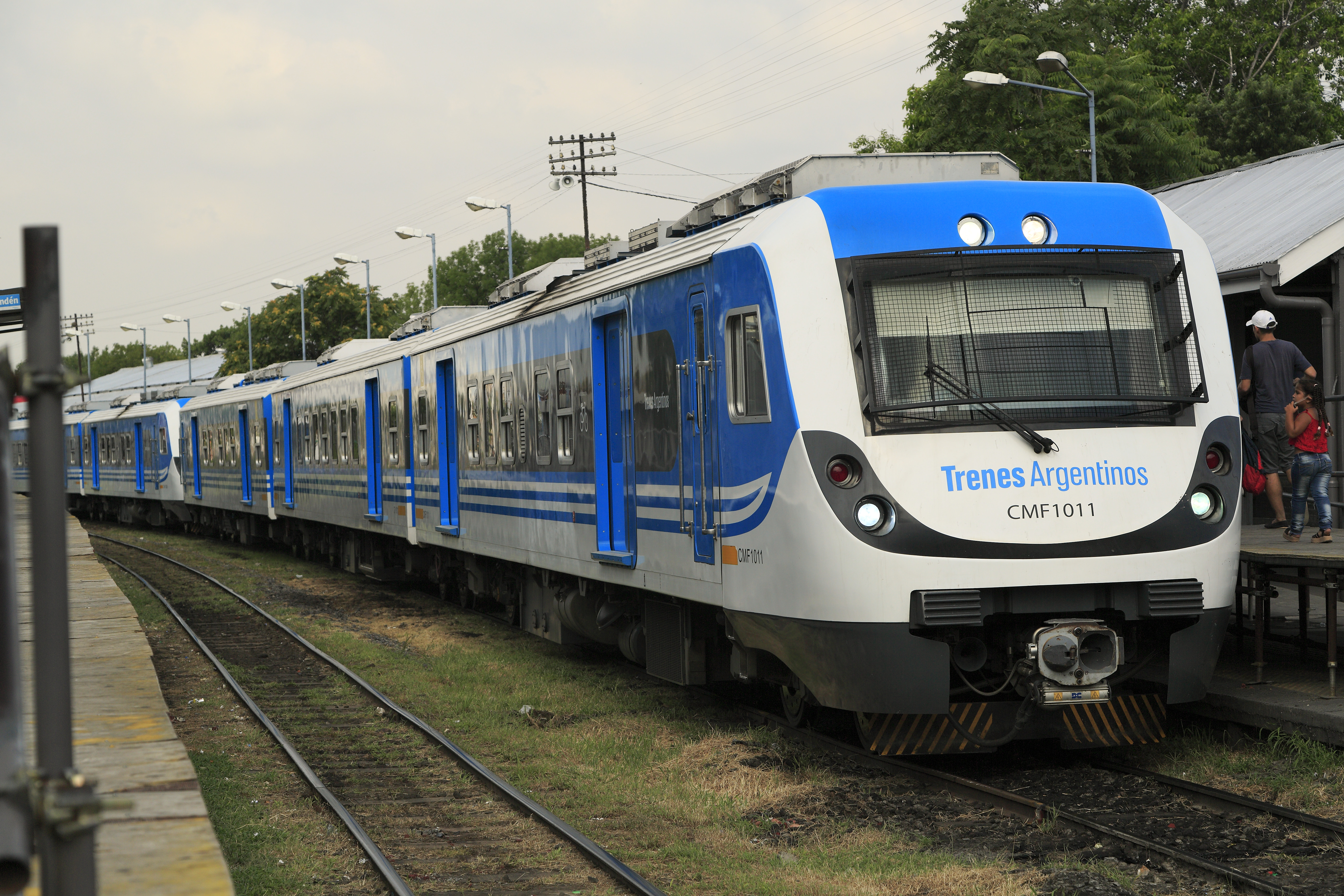
- CM 1011 at Doctor Antonio Sáenz station, 2018
- Stock type: Diesel multiple unit
- Manufacturer: CNR Corporation
- Constructed: 2014
- Number built: 81 cars
- Formation: 3 cars per trainset
- Operators: Trenes Argentinos Operaciones
- Lines served: Belgrano Sur line

Specifications
- Width: 2,750 mm (9 ft 1/4 in)
- Maximum speed: 100 km/h (62 mph)
- Track gauge: 1,000 mm (3 ft 3 3/8 in)

The CNR diesel multiple unit is a diesel multiple unit (DMU) designed for suburban passenger service in the south and west of the Buenos Aires metropolitan area. The trains were acquired by the Argentine government in 2013 at a cost of $89 million, and are used on the Belgrano Sur line, which formerly used locomotive-hauled stock.

The contract established the manufacture of 27 formations consisting of two control cars and one intermediate trailer car. The purchase of the formations facilitated the extension of services on branch G to Marcos Paz, a section which not see rail service since 1993.

== Background and construction ==
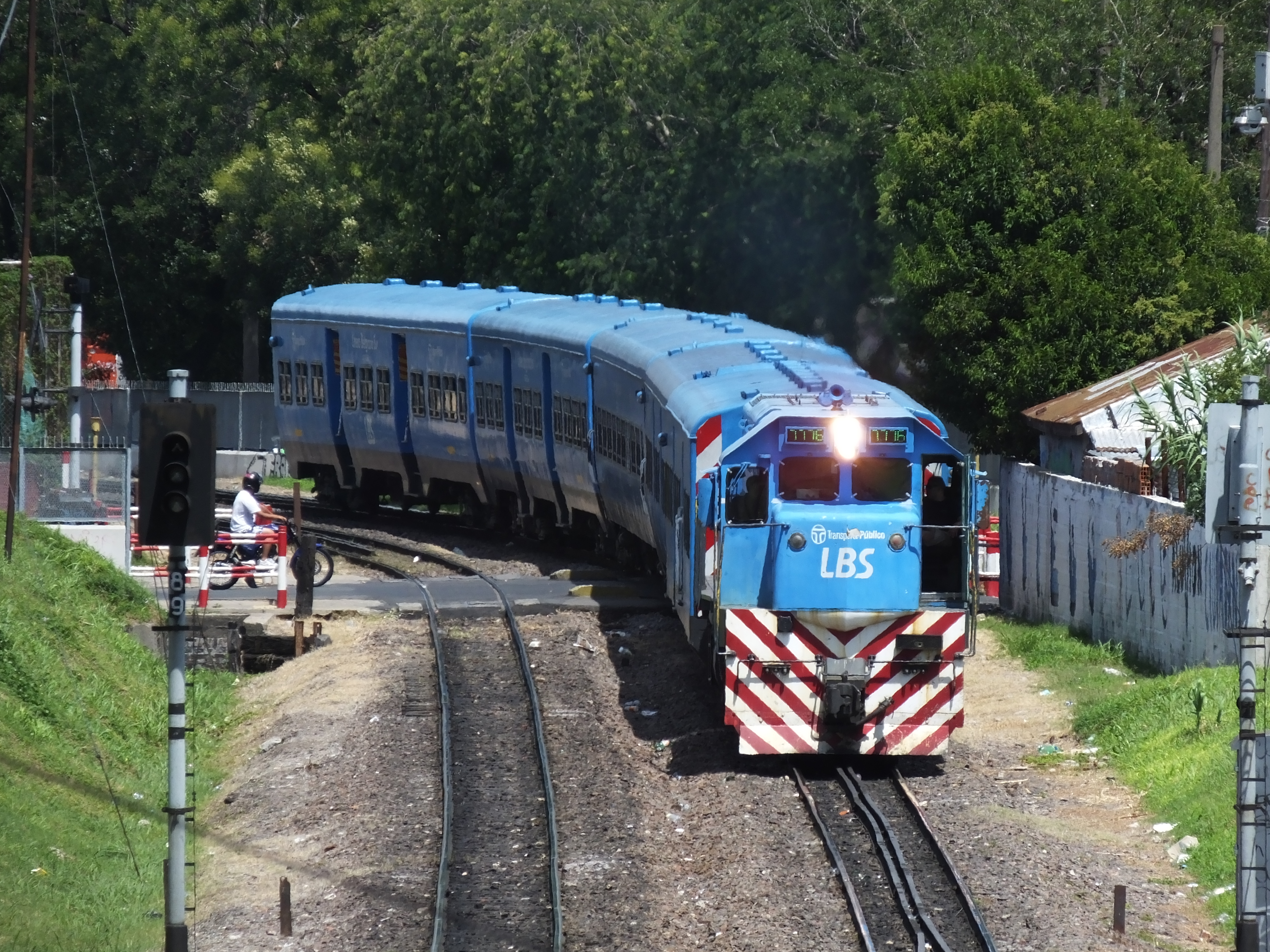
An EMD G22 hauling a loco-hauled commuter train, 2015

When the state-owned Trenes Argentinos took over the Belgrano Sur line from Argentren on 2 March 2015, Minister of the Interior and Transport Florencio Randazzo decided to purchase 81 cars (formed into 27 3-car sets) from the Chinese company CNR Corporation, as part of the Government's plan to modernise the line.

The first batch of new rolling stock was expected to be arrive from May 2015, but only arrived in Buenos Aires on 7 July of that year. It was then announced that the new rolling stock would begin running on the Buenos Aires to González Catán route in August. The other parts of the line received the new rolling stock before the end of 2015, as more railcars arrived in the country.

As the railcars were being delivered, all 28 stations were to be refurbished and modernised, which included raising the platform height to match the new rolling stock.

== Service history ==
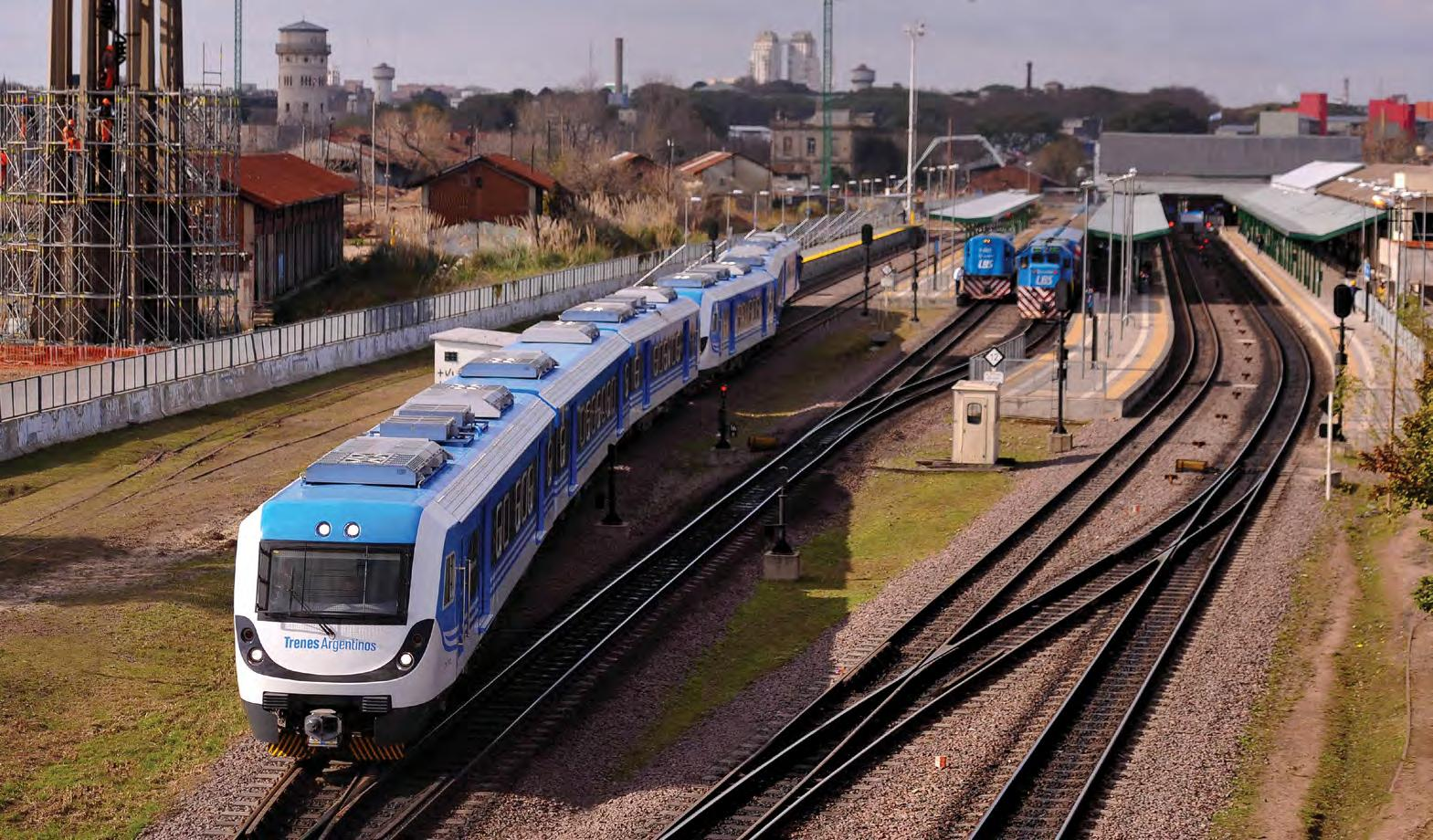
A six-car CNR DMU set leaving Buenos Aires station, 2015

In early October 2019, set CM 1015 was trialed on the section from González Catán and 20 de Junio, which had overseen rehabilitation since its abandonment in 1993. Services to 20 de Junio was supposed to commence on 14 November 2019, but was delayed after inspections found numerous flaws with the line, including signaling issues and lack of staff training. Although the 20 de Junio service eventually started on 2 December 2019, the single CNR DMU that initially ran the section was displaced by two Emepa Alerce railcars in January 2020, due to low demand.

The CNR DMUs suffered from a shortage of spare parts, causing service reduction on the Belgrano Sur line in July 2023 (although officially, the service reduction was due to infrastructural maintenance, rather than delayed rolling stock repairs and parts delivery some sources noted), and again in August, which also delayed service commencement on the Marinos del Crucero Gral branch by a week until the 14th.

To address the issue, in September 2023, Trenes Argentinos handed out tenders in purchasing spare parts from both domestic and international contracts. Trenes Argentinos and the Ministry of Transport had previously signed a contract in 2020 with CRRC Tangshan to supply parts for the CNR DMUs, as well as the 20 CNR CKD8 diesel locomotives that hauled Argentina's long-distance trains, but has not been fulfilled in time. The contract failed in March 2024, causing further reduction of services during April, with the González Catán branch seeing the daily number of trains dwindled from 110 to 88, and off-peak frequency doubled to 40 minutes per train.

Trenes Argentinos made another attempt in gathering spare parts for the CNR DMUs, by signing a new contract in July 2024, followed by the purchase of 802 wheels in January 2025 for its fleet operating on the Roca, San Martin, and Belgrano Sur lines.

== See also ==
- Rail transport in Argentina
- CNR CKD8 - Diesel locomotives manufactured by CNR for Argentina
- CSR EMU (Argentina) - Chinese-built electric multiple units used on other lines
- Emepa Alerce - Argentine-built narrow gauge DMU for the Belgrano Norte Line
- Trenes Argentinos - Operator
