= Argentren =

Former Argentine regional railway company (2014–15)

Argentren S.A.

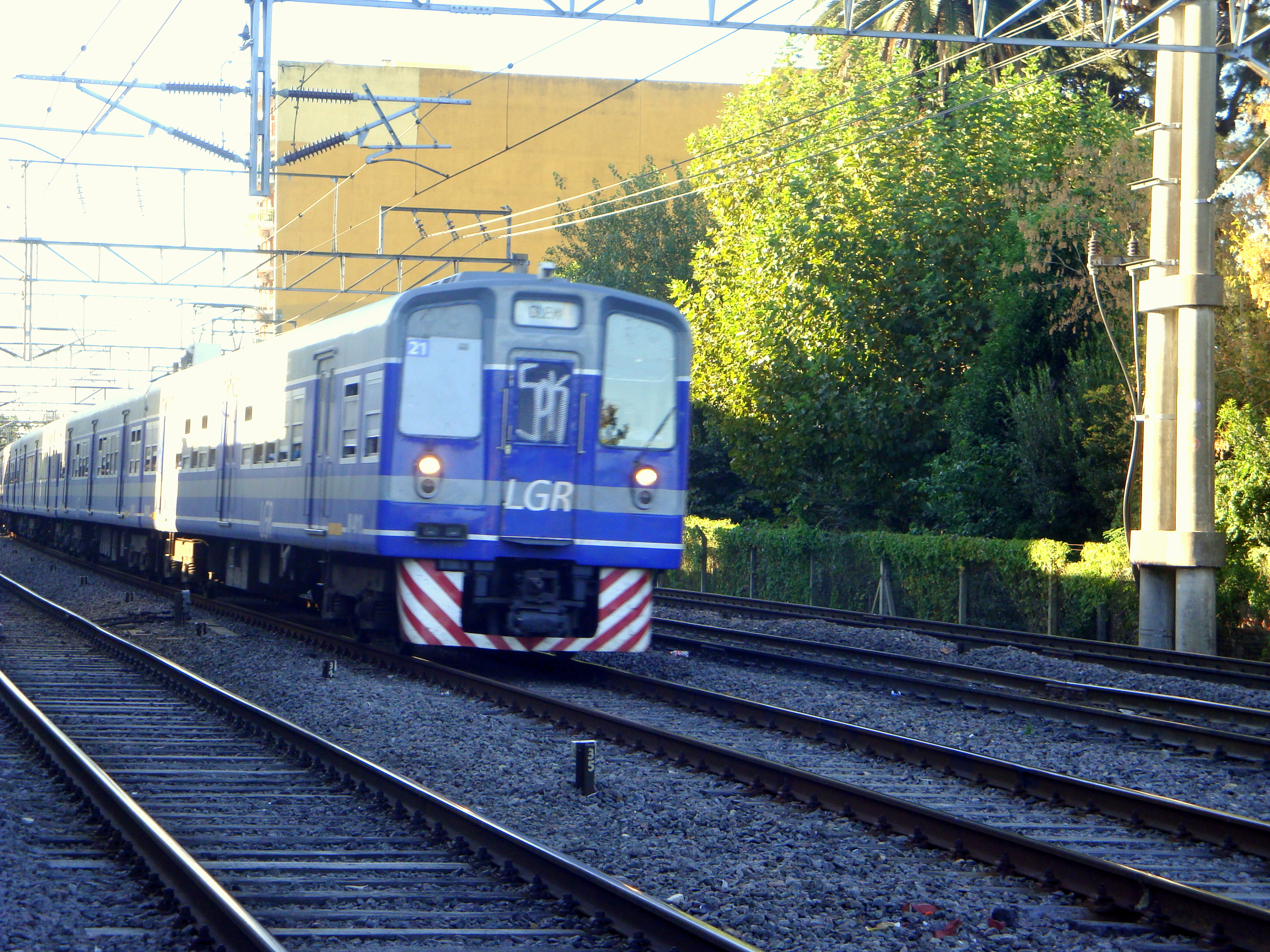
- Roca Line electric train operated by Argentren.
- Company type: Private
- Industry: Railway
- Predecessor: Metropolitano (Note: Only private companies are listed. State-owned companies that operated the Belgrano Sur and Roca line were Ferrocarriles Argentinos (1948-91) and FEMESA (1991-94).) (1994-2012); UGOFE (2012-14)
- Founded: 2014; 12 years ago
- Defunct: March 2, 2015; 10 years ago (Ceased operations)
- Headquarters: Buenos Aires, Argentina
- Area served: Buenos Aires Province
- Key people: Norberto Cots (President)
- Services: Passenger trains
- Owner: Emepa Group
- Website: argentren-sa.com.ar at archive.org

Argentren S.A. was an Argentine private company that operated the Belgrano Sur and Roca railway services in Buenos Aires Province for about one year until the Government of Argentina rescinded the agreement with the company in March 2015. Since then, the Mitre and San Martín line are operated by State-owned company Operadora Ferroviaria Sociedad del Estado (SOFSE).

The company was part of the Emepa Group, a consortium that has also been operating the Belgrano Norte Line through Ferrovías since 1994.

== History ==
On May 24, 2012, the contract with TBA to operate the Mitre and Sarmiento lines was revoked by the Government of Argentina after the Once station rail disaster. Both lines were temporarily operated by UGOFE, a consortium formed by railway companies Ferrovías, Metrovías and TBA, although TBA would be excluded from it a few days later.

On February 12, 2014, the Government of Argentina announced that some companies would take over the lines operated by UGOFE. The consortium was officially dissolved.

Emepa Group also owned Ferrocentral, a railway company formed with Nuevo Central Argentino to run passenger services to Rosario, Tucumán and Córdoba cities of Argentina. The company was dissolved in November 2014, when the National Government took over the services, since then operated by SOFSE.

When UGOFE and UGOMS were dissolved, Corredores Ferroviarios (a company part of Grupo Roggio, which also owns Metrovías, a company that operates the Buenos Aires Subte and Urquiza line since 1994) and Argentren took over the Mitre / San Martín and Belgrano Sur / Roca lines, respectively.

On March 2, 2015, the Government of Argentina rescinded the contract with Argentren through its state-owned company SOFSE. The contract with the company had been signed in February 2014, committing Argentren to operate the Roca and Belgrano Sur lines.

== Services operated ==
Line	Connects	Type
Roca	Constitución - Ezeiza	Electric
Roca	Constitución - Alejandro Korn	Electric
Roca	Constitución - La Plata	Diesel
Roca	Temperley - Bosques	Diesel
Roca	Temperley - Haedo	Diesel
Roca	University train	Diesel
Belgrano Sur	Buenos Aires - González Catán	Diesel
Belgrano Sur	Tapiales - Marinos Cruc. Gral. Belgrano	Diesel
Belgrano Sur	Puente Alsina - Aldo Bonzi	Diesel
