= Buenos Aires Belgrano Sur Line railway station =

Former railway station in Buenos Aires, Argentina

Coordinates: 34.6454°S 58.3936°W

Buenos Aires
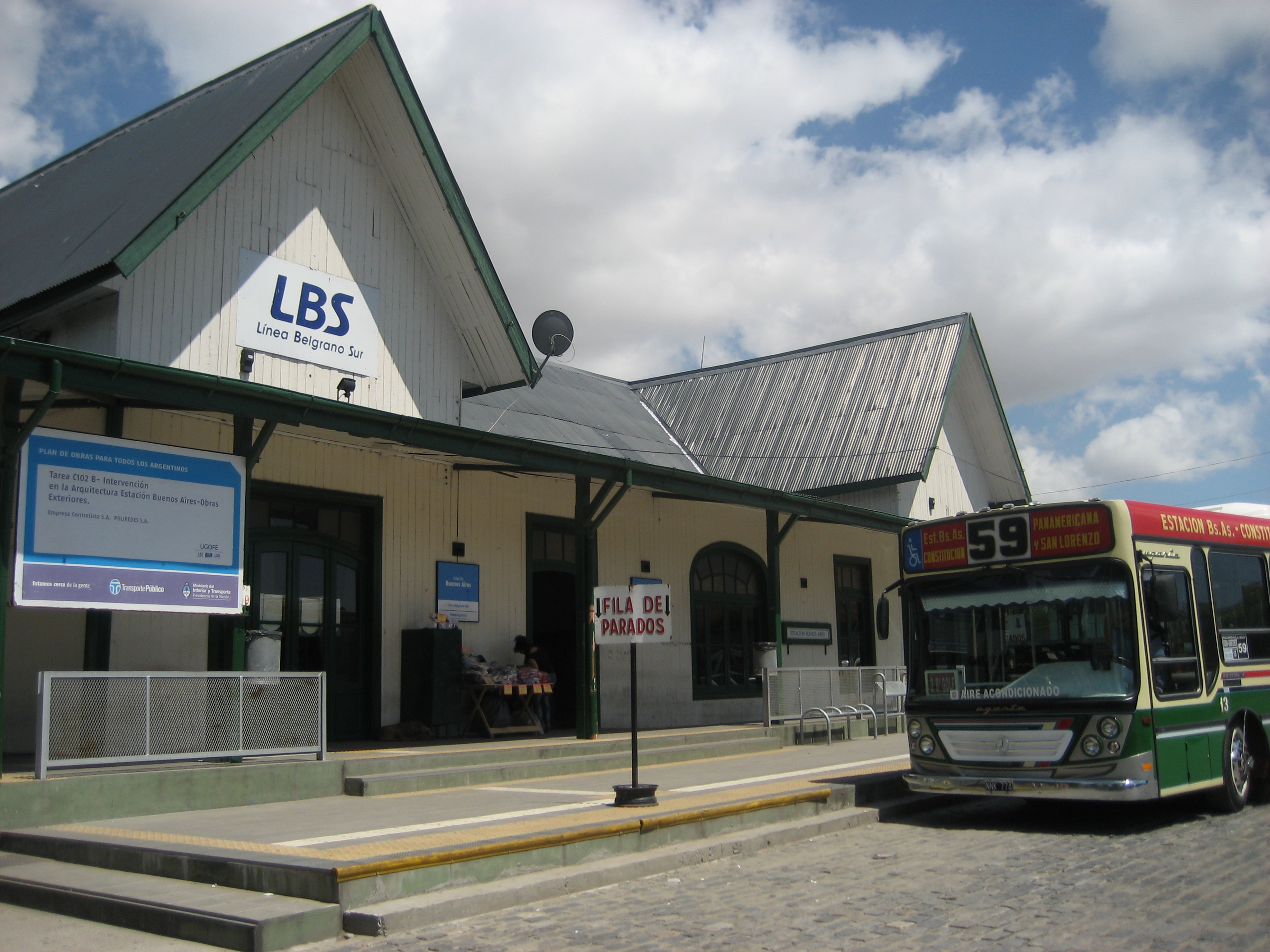
- Front view of the station in 2015

General information
- Location: Olavarría 3300, Buenos Aires; Argentina
- System: Commuter rail
- Owner: Government of Argentina
- Operator: Trenes Argentinos (2015–18)
- Line: Belgrano Sur

Construction
- Platform levels: 5

History
- Opened: 1911
- Closed: May 2018; 8 years ago
- Former names: yes
Location
- Location within Buenos Aires Location within Argentina Location within South America

Buenos Aires (Spanish: Estación Buenos Aires) is a former passenger railway station in the city of Buenos Aires, Argentina. The station was terminus of the Belgrano Sur line that runs trains along Greater Buenos Aires region.

The station is located a short distance north of the Riachuelo River, on the boundaries between the barrios of Parque Patricios and Barracas, two outlying neighbourhoods in the southern part of the city.

== Overview ==
Despite its name, Buenos Aires was not the principal railway station of the city but only a secondary commuter rail station. The local transport company Argentren operates various daily diesel trains to and from the Buenos Aires suburbs along two branches of the Belgrano Sur line. Destinations include several stations in La Matanza, Merlo and Morón partidos.

The station was accessible by some city bus services but it is the only railway station in Buenos Aires that has no access to the Subte of Buenos Aires.

== History ==
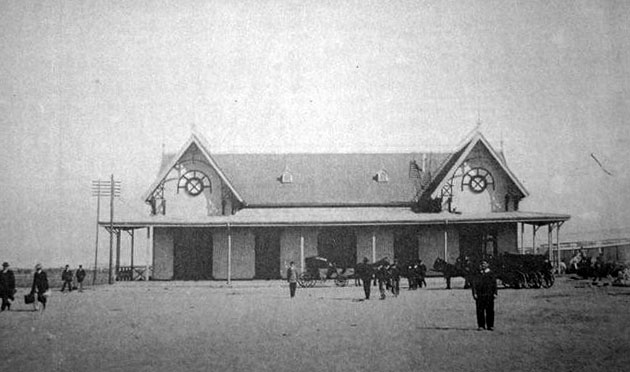
The station soon after being opened, c. 1911

Buenos Aires was opened in 1911 as part of the French-owned company Compañía Gral. de Buenos Aires railway network, that reached several cities in the Buenos Aires Province such as Patricios in 9 de Julio Partido, General Villegas, Victorino de la Plaza (Guaminí Partido), La Plata and Vedia among other destinations.

When the entire Argentine railway network was nationalised in 1948, state-owned company Ferrocarriles Argentinos took over the services of the line. In August 1977, National decree 2294 stated the closure of 225-km. of the line and all rail tracks were also removed. Due to increasing population in the region, the "Marinos del Crucero Gral. Belgrano" was built for passenger services.

With the railway privatisation carried out by Carlos Menem's presidency, concession was granted to Metropolitano although the concession would be revoked in 2007 because of the poor service conditions, being consortium UGOFE the operator of the line until 2013.

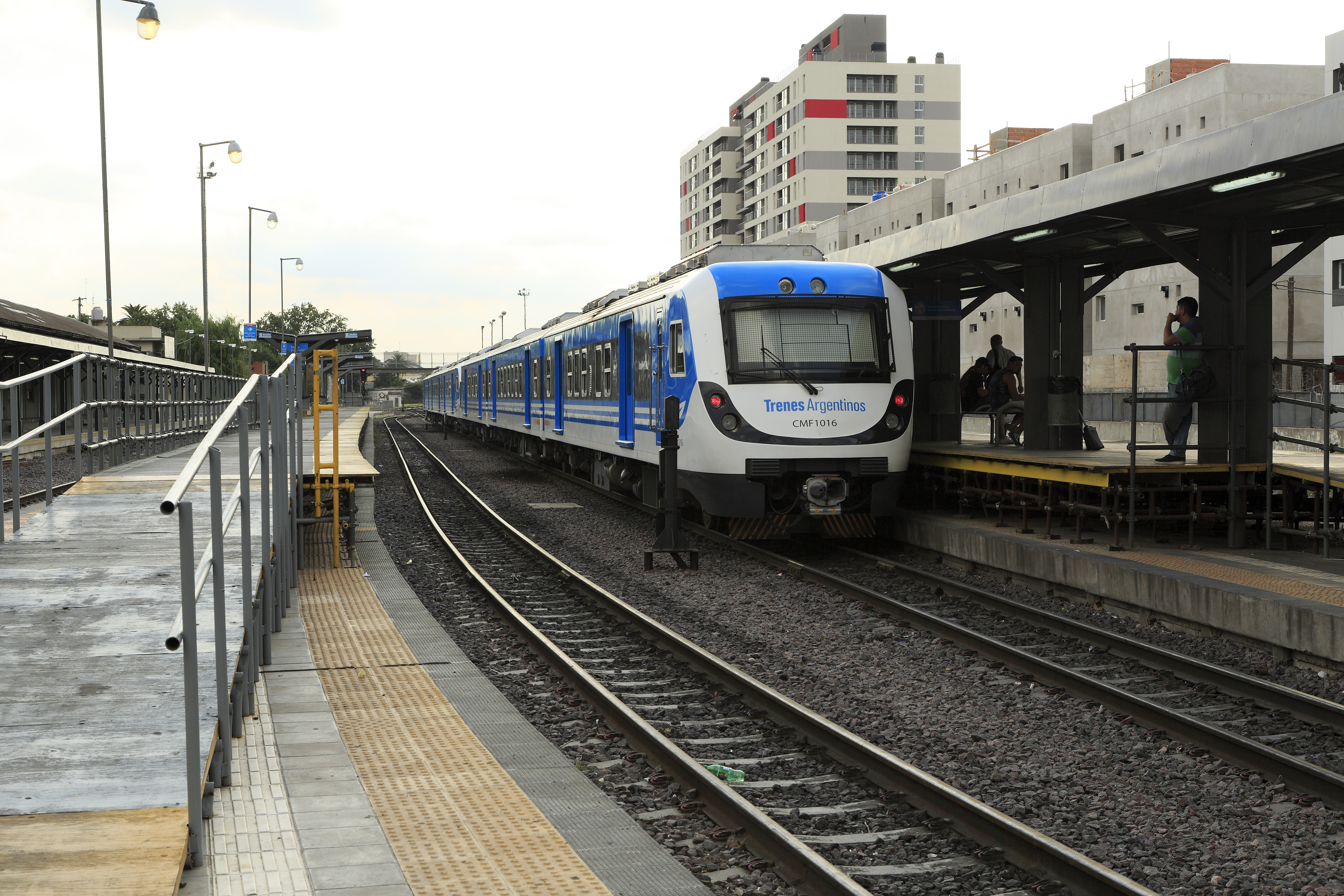
CNR EMU at the station in 2018

When UGOFE was dissolved, private company Argentren took over the Belgrano Sur line.

In May 2018, Buenos Aires and Sáenz stations were closed as part of a project that includes the construction of a viaduct where Belgrano Sur trains will run, which will allow to eliminate several level crossings in the city. The viaduct will also connect Belgrano Sur trains with Constitución station of Roca Line. Moreover, new Buenos Aires and Sáenz stations will be built over the viaduct. Meanwhile, a provisional station (close to former Sáenz stations) is being used as terminus.

== Historic operators ==
Companies that operated the Buenos Aires train station since its inauguration were:

Operator	Period
(France) Compañía General de Buenos Aires	1911–1948
(Argentina) Ferrocarriles Argentinos	1948–1991
(Argentina) FEMESA (Note: Temporary operator prior to the privatization of commuter rail services.)	1991–1994
(Argentina) Metropolitano	1994–2007
(Argentina) UGOFE (Note: Temporary operator after the government revoked concession to Metropolitano.)	2007–2014
(Argentina) Argentren	2014–2015
(Argentina) Trenes Argentinos	2015–2018

== See also ==
- Belgrano Sur Line
