= Metrovías =

Argentinian privately owned railway company

Metrovías S.A.

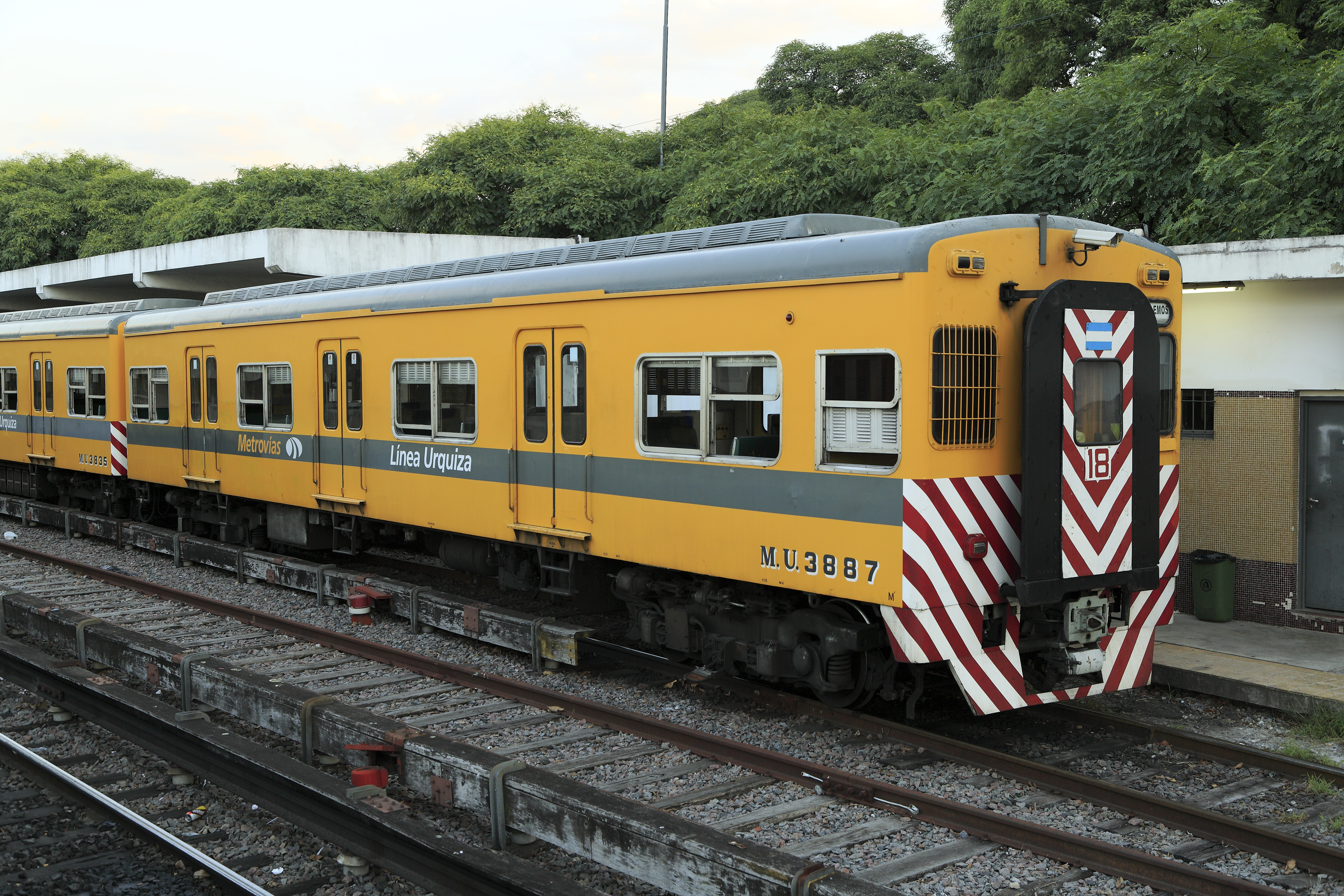
- Train at Federico Lacroze of Urquiza Line, operated by Metrovías
- Type: Sociedad Anónima
- Predecessor: Subterráneos de Buenos Aires (SBA); FEMESA
- Founded: 1 January 1994; 32 years ago
- Headquarters: Buenos Aires, Argentina
- Area served: City of Buenos Aires
- Key people: Benito Roggio, owner
- Services: Maintenance, repair and operations of Urquiza Line
- Owner: Roggio Group
- Number of employees: 4,500
- Parent: Roggio Group
- Website: metrovias.com.ar

Metrovías S.A. is an Argentine privately held company that operates the Metropolitan services of the Urquiza Line. 90% of Metrovías' shares are held by Grupo Roggio. Metrovías was also operator of the Buenos Aires Underground from 1995 to December 2021, when "Emova Movilidad S.A." took over the concession of the service for 12 years. Emova is also part of the Roggio Group and also associated with Metrovías.

== History ==
On 1 January 1994, Metrovías took over the concession, granted by the Argentine government as part of railway privatisation during the presidency of Carlos Menem, for the operation of the standard gauge Urquiza Line commuter rail service in Buenos Aires, Argentina. The Metrovías consortium comprised Burlington Northern, Morrison-Knudsen and two Argentinian companies. This service had previously been run by the state-owned Ferrocarriles Argentinos as part of the General Urquiza Railway since the nationalisation of the railways in 1948. In addition Metrovías took over the management of the Buenos Aires Underground system and the Buenos Aires PreMetro when they were privatised in 1994.

The Urquiza Line operates from Federico Lacroze to General Lemos stations. Formerly it had a total of 108 stations, 72.9 kilometres of track, with 692 carriages that transport 283.8 million passengers per year, when Metrovías had the Urquiza and Underground concessions. The company has approximately 3,000 employees.

From 2004 to 2013 the company also formed part of UGOFE, a consortium with Trenes de Buenos Aires and Ferrovías, which took over the running of commuter rail services on the Belgrano Sur Line, Roca Line and San Martín Line after concessions granted to Metropolitano S.A. for the operation of these services were revoked.

In December 2021, a new company, "Emova Movilidad S.A." (formed by Metrovías and the Roggio Group) took over the concession of the Buenos Aires Underground, for a period of 12 years.
