= Urquiza Line =

Commuter rail service in Buenos Aires, Argentina

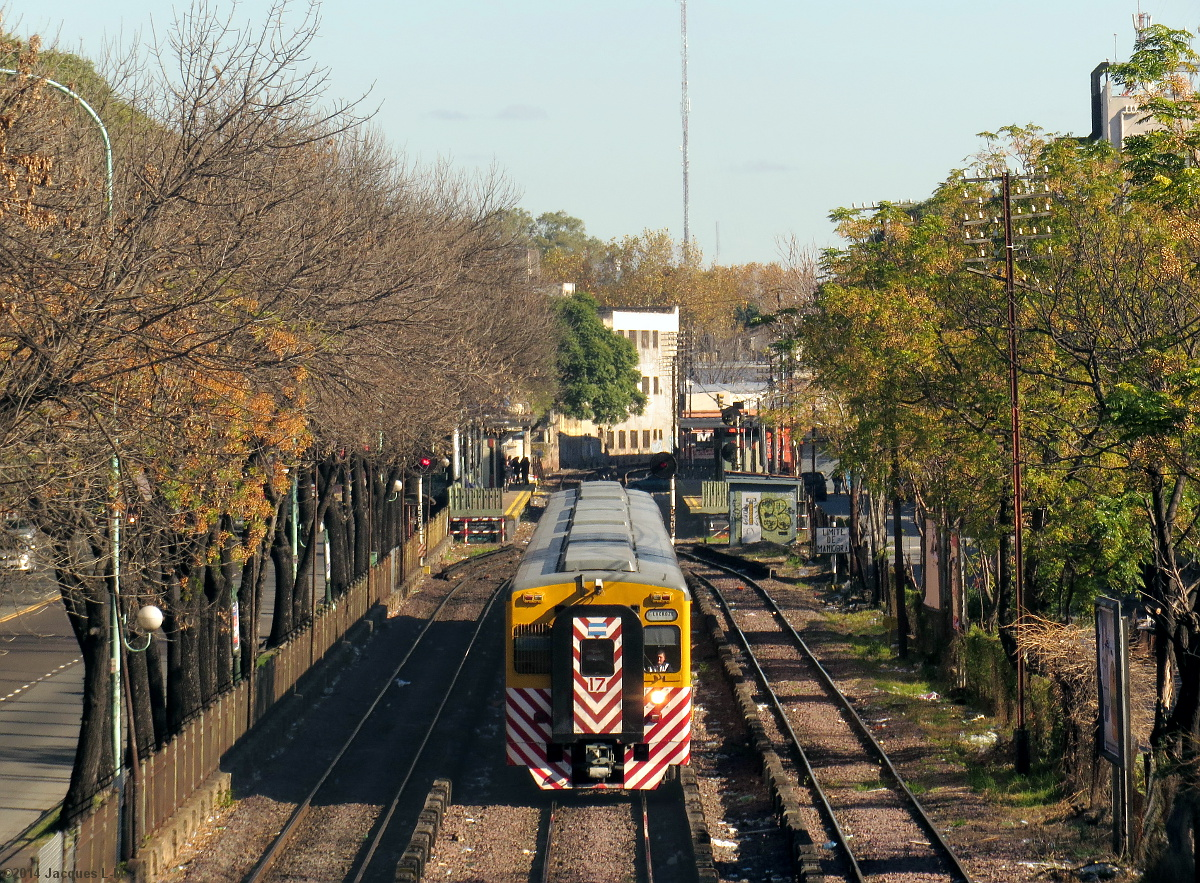
- Toshiba EMU leaving José Artigas station, May 2014

Overview
- Service type: Commuter rail, Rapid transit
- Locale: Greater Buenos Aires
- Predecessor: Entre Ríos R North Eastern R
- First service: 1948; 78 years ago
- Current operator: Metrovías
- Former operator: Ferrocarriles Argentinos
- Ridership: 15,617,193 (2019)
- Website: Tren Urquiza

Route
- Termini: Federico Lacroze; General Lemos
- Stops: 23
- Distance travelled: 25.5 km (15.8 mi)

Technical
- Track gauge: 1,435 mm (4 ft 8 1/2 in) standard gauge
- Electrification: Third rail, 600 V DC
Route map
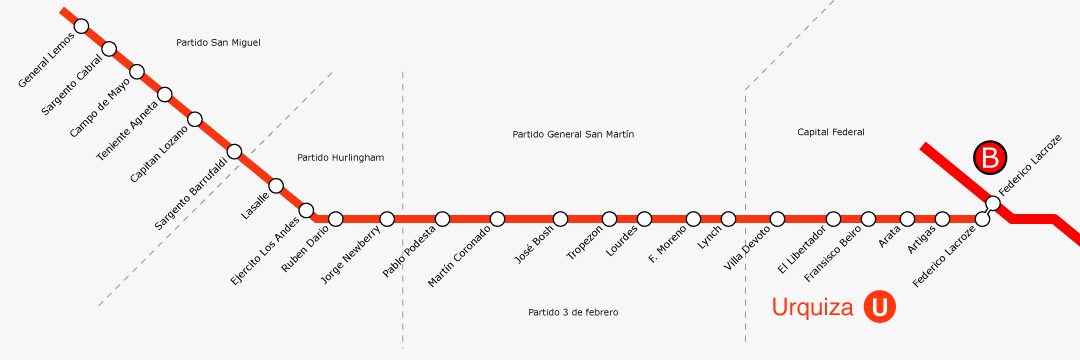

The Urquiza Line is a 26 km (16 mi) suburban electric commuter rail line in Buenos Aires, Argentina, operated by the former Buenos Aires Underground operator Metrovías. It runs from the Federico Lacroze terminus in the neighborhood of Chacarita, to General Lemos terminus in Campo de Mayo district of Greater Buenos Aires, completing a total journey time of 46 minutes. The line uses third rail current collection and, at present, is used by an average of 75,400 passengers daily. The line operates 20 hours a day, 7 days a week at 8 to 30 minute intervals. This suburban line runs on track once operated by General Urquiza Railway before railway privatisation.

In earlier times the line was planned to run into the centre of Buenos Aires, through a long tunnel. But when the tunnel was finally built in 1930, it was taken over by the Underground system as part of Line B, and as a result, suburban passengers had to change at Federico Lacroze, named after its builder, about 6 km (3.7 mi) from the centre. The ramp connecting the Urquiza Line to Line B still exists, though it is only used for maintenance purposes. Today Federico Lacroze has a direct connection to the line B underground station of the same name.

Like the Buenos Aires Underground system, the Urquiza line uses the 1,435 mm (4 ft 8 1/2 in) standard gauge rather than the 1,676 mm (5 ft 6 in) broad gauge used in other interurban railways of Buenos Aires.

== History ==
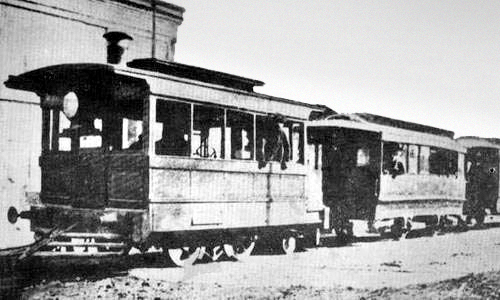
Early days Lacroze rural tramway

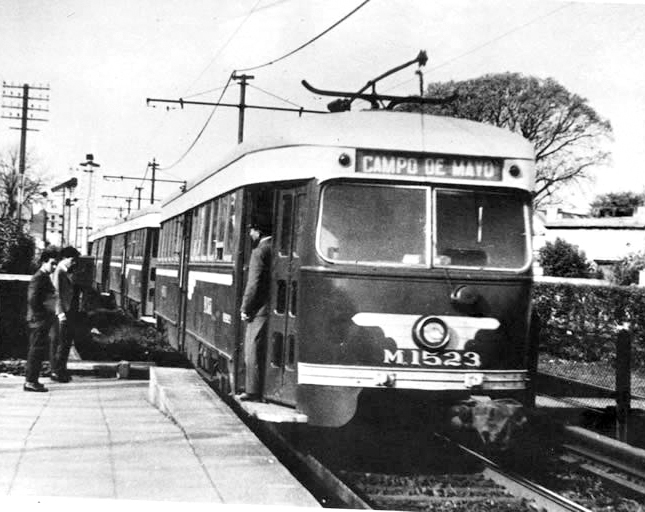
Trams were acquired from Pacific Electric in the 1950s

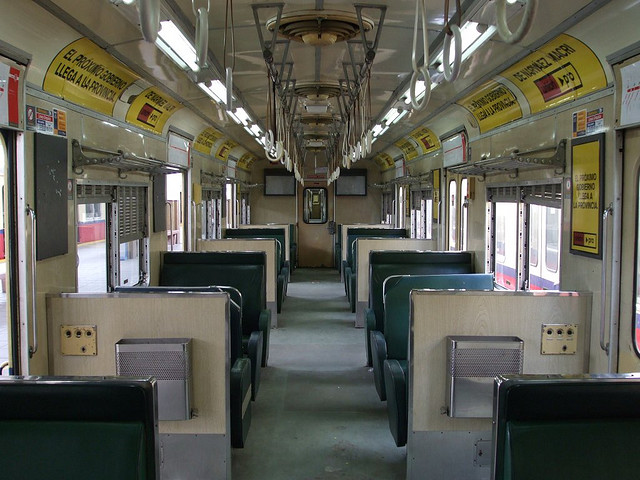
Toshiba coach interior

The brothers Federico and Teófilo Lacroze were pioneers opening several horse-drawn tramway lines in Buenos Aires city, first in 1868 from Plaza de Mayo to Plaza Once and in 1870 the "Tramway Central of Lacroze".

On 2 October 1884, they were granted a concession to build a 47 kilometres (29 mi) railway also pulled by horses from Buenos Aires through open country southwest to Pilar. On 6 April 1888, the line was opened with the name of "Tramway Rural" (rural tramway) to Pilar with a branch to San Martín thereafter.

Three years later, in 1891, it was converted to steam and as the capital expanded, business to the suburbs was so good that a new branch to Campo de Mayo was inaugurated in 1904 using electric power supply, and the whole section between Federico Lacroze and San Martín was electrified in 1908. Electricity came from the Lacroze tramways of Buenos Aires and overhead wires delivered 600 volt DC current to a fleet of wooden US-style interurban coaches from Brill.

In 1897 the line was renamed Ferrocarril Rural de la Provincia de Buenos Aires (Buenos Aires Province Rural Railway) and in 1906 it was renamed again to Ferrocarril Central de Buenos Aires (Buenos Aires Central Railway). However, since it was still operated by its owners, it continued to be known unofficially as the "Federico Lacroze Rural Tramway".

The original cars were still running by the end of the 1940s and had become too unsafe to permit continued private operation, and the line was nationalised by Juan Domingo Perón's government in 1948 and became part of the General Urquiza Railway, one of the several divisions of the state-owned Ferrocarriles Argentinos.

By 1951 it was completely rebuilt, new substations were set up, new modern cantilever roofed stations made of reinforced concrete were built and 28 used 1700 series interurban coaches, manufactured by Pacific Electric Railway between 1925 and 1928, were bought. One interesting fact is that in 1959, General Urquiza Railway acquired 30 PCC cars, built by the Pullman Standard in 1940. These were modified at the ends to operate in two, three or four-sectioned articulated formations like most modern LRVs. They were all retired by the mid-1960s, because they were too lightly built to handle the heavy passenger loads.

The Pacific Electric coaches were used until 1974 when they were replaced by 128 new Toshiba Japanese underground coaches, third rail current collectors were installed and the station platforms were raised at the same time to match the new coaches.

=== Historic operators ===
Companies that have operated the Urquiza Line since it was established after the 1948 nationalisation are:

| Operator | Period |
|---|---|
| Ferrocarriles Argentinos | 1948–1991 |
| FEMESA | 1991–1994 |
| Metrovías | 1994–pres. |

== Urquiza line today ==
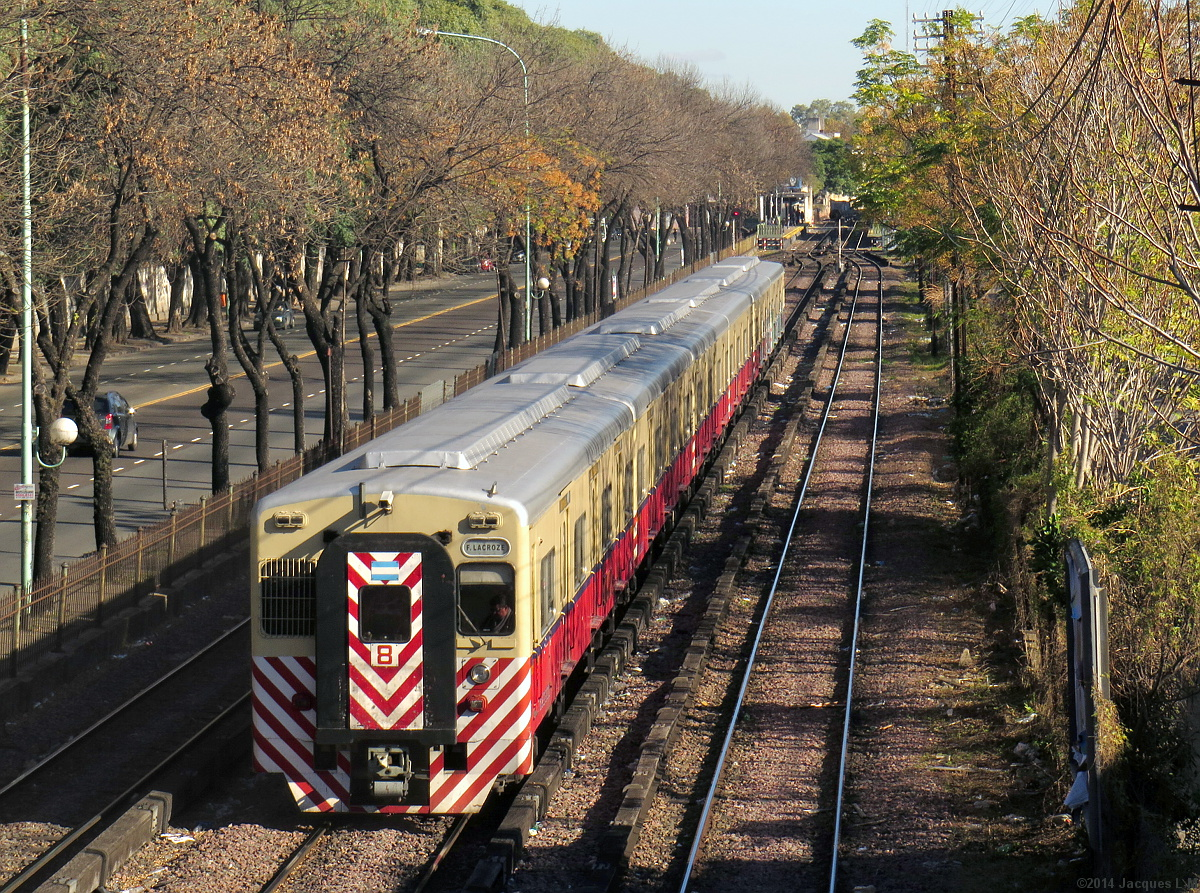
Some EMUs still carry their original Ferrocarriles Argentinos livery

The number of passengers carried by the Urquiza Line has increased steadily in recent years and several improvements have been made, including adapting stations for the disabled, grade crossings improvements, new concrete sleepers and welded rail joints for the entire line and up-dated electrical components.

In the meantime, it is still possible that the rebuilding of the existing ramp at Federico Lacroze underground station would allow connection to Line B, enabling trains to run through to the centre of Buenos Aires, a dilemma which is uncertain at this moment, simply because the UTA (Unión Tranviarios Automotor, in English; Tram Drivers' Union) and Rail Unions are not compatible with each other and therefore do not agree on it.

When the Red de Expresos Regionales was announced in 2015 as a project to connect all lines of the Buenos Aires commuter rail network through a series of tunnels, the Urquiza Line was curiously the only line left out of the project, despite being the only line with the infrastructure already in place to bring commuters directly to the project's planned central station.

In June 2019 the line was deemed to the most crowded in the world by Google based on crowdedness reports by its users.

== Gallery ==
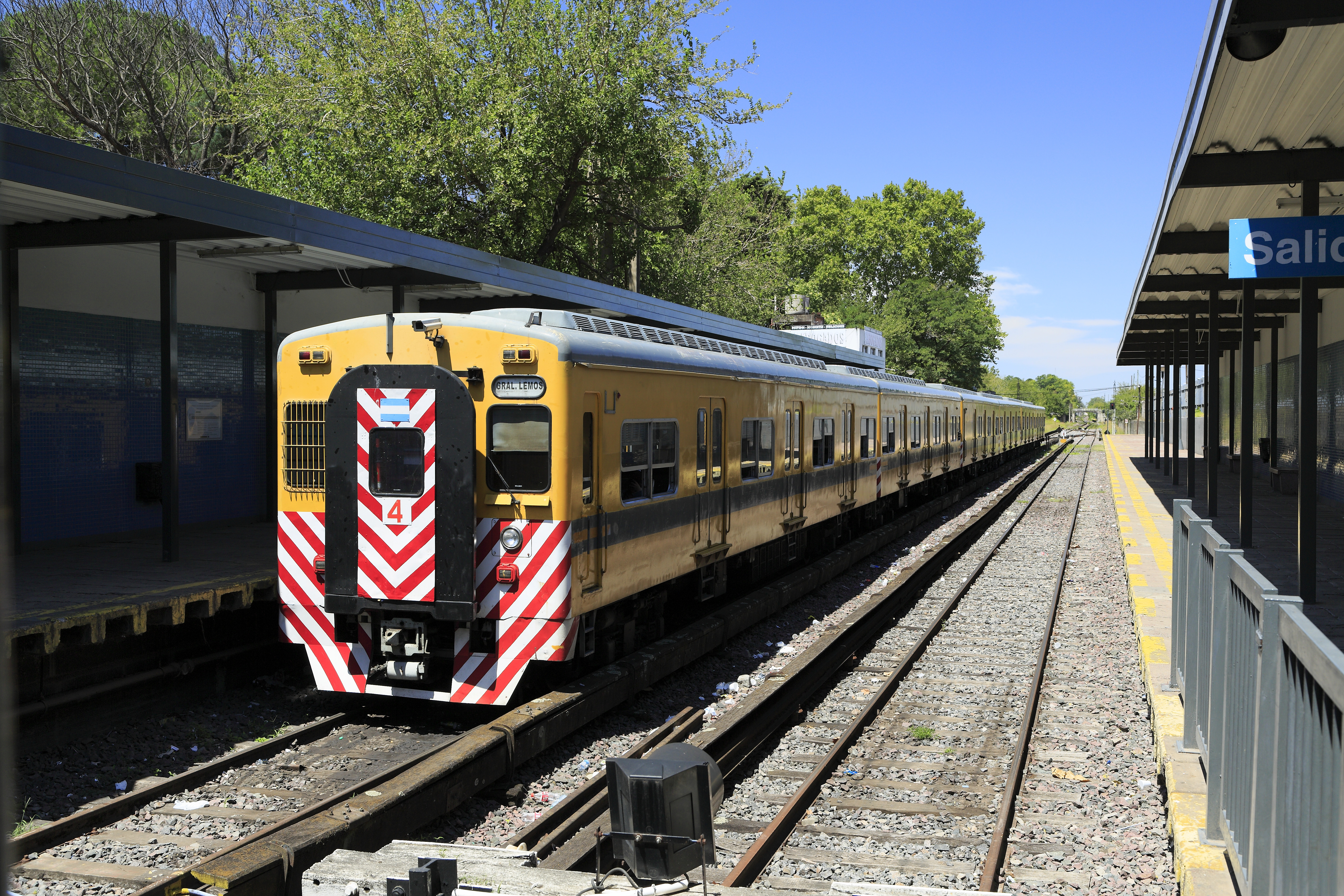
Toshiba electric multiple unit at Gral. Lemos

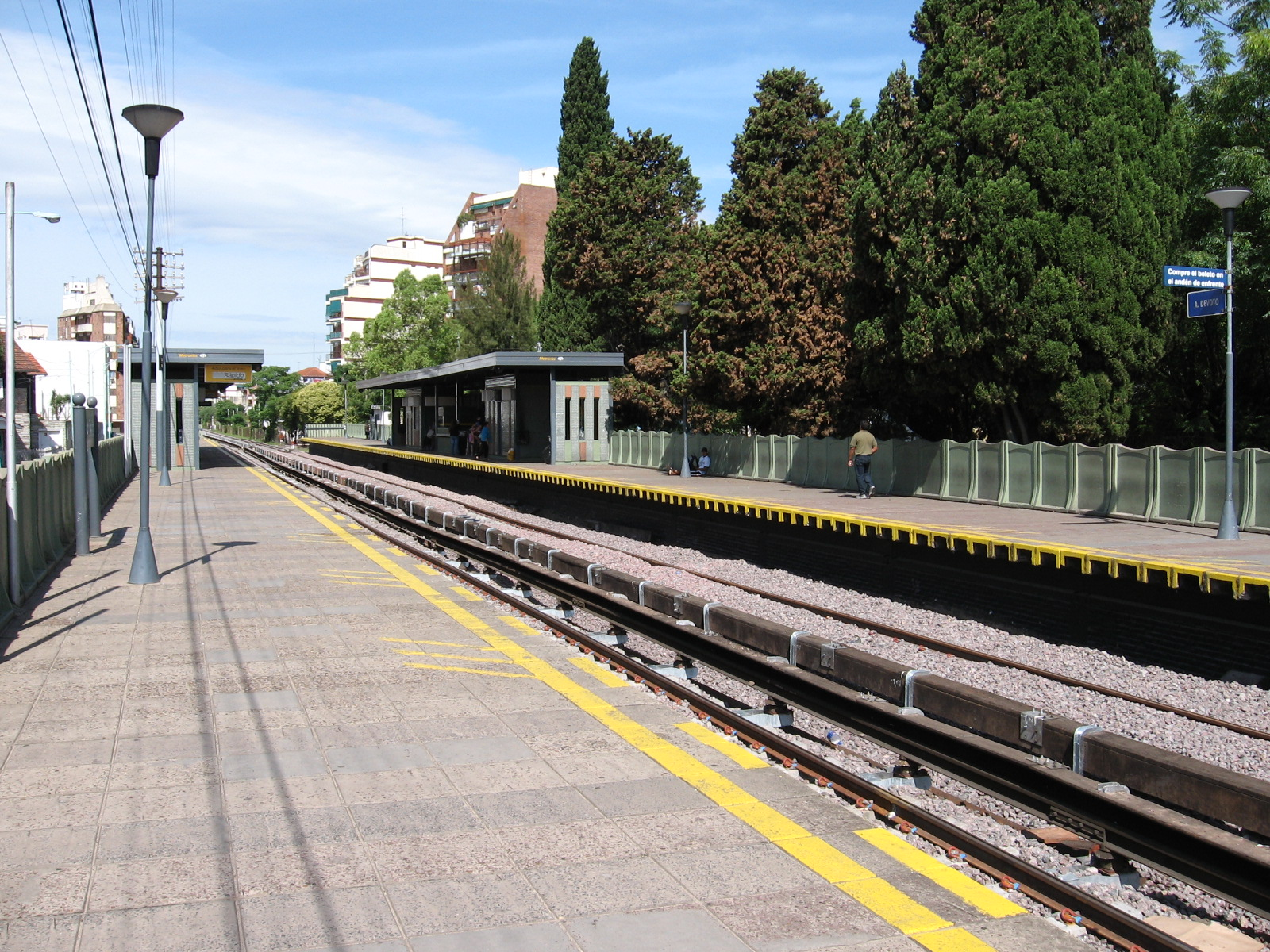
A. Devoto station

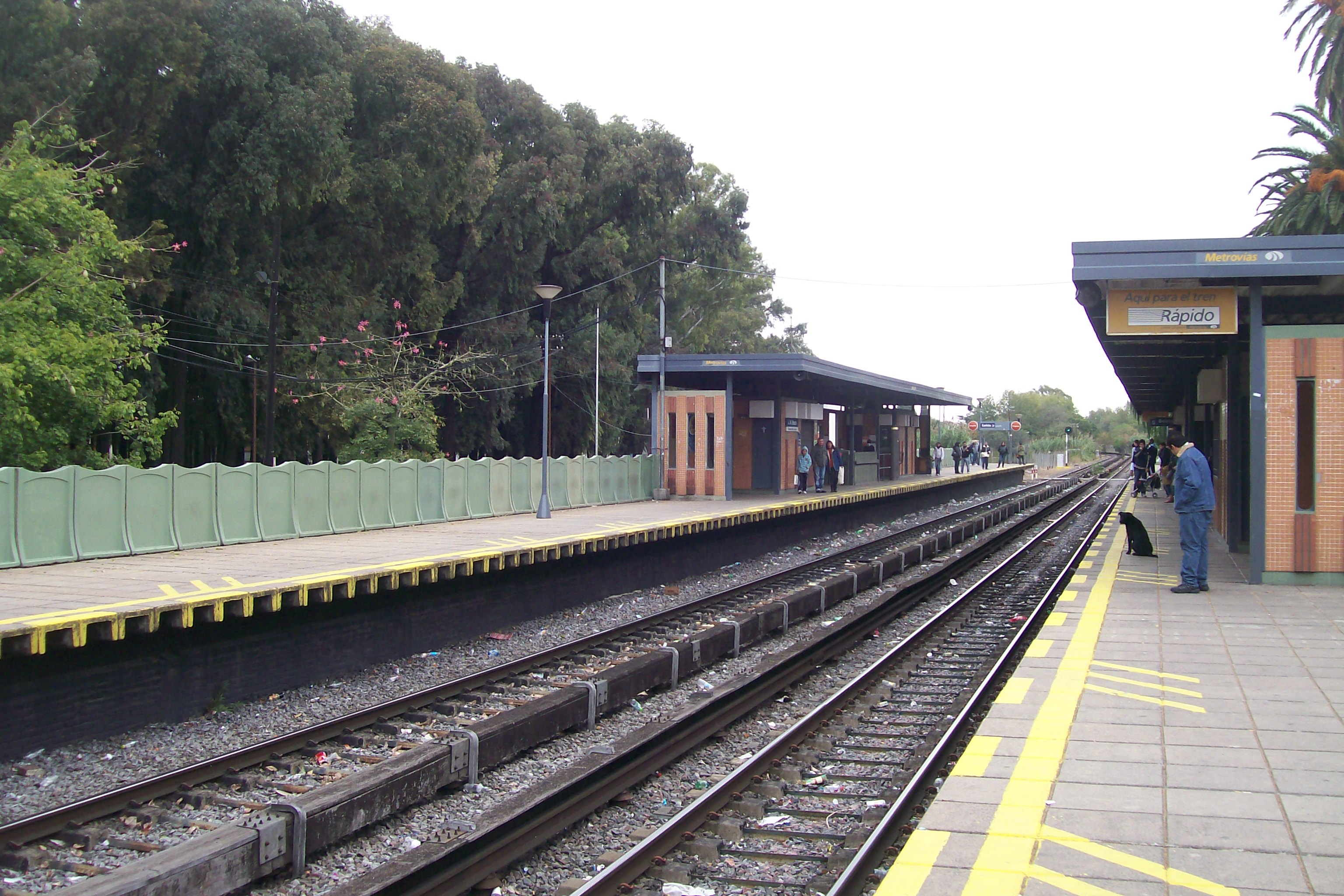
J.M. Bosch station

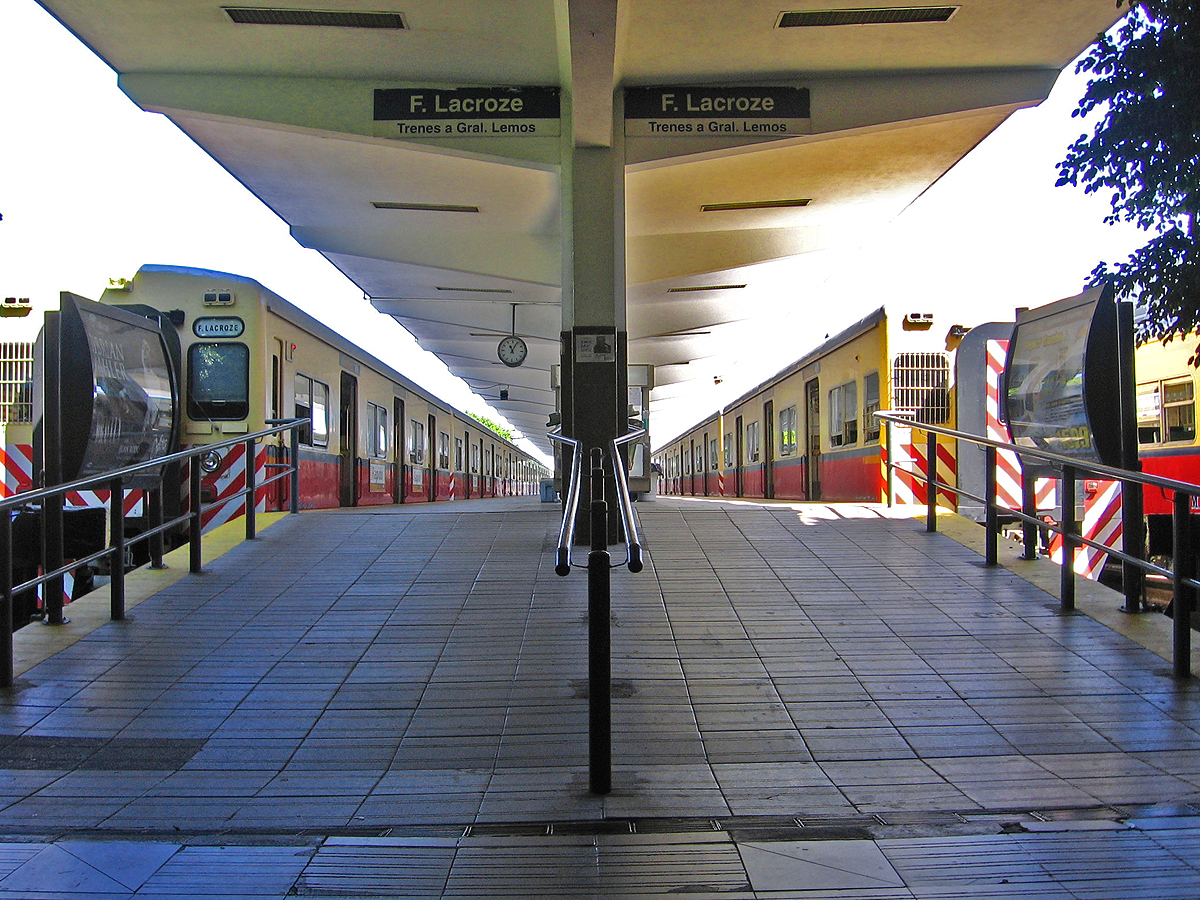
Platforms of Federico Lacroze station

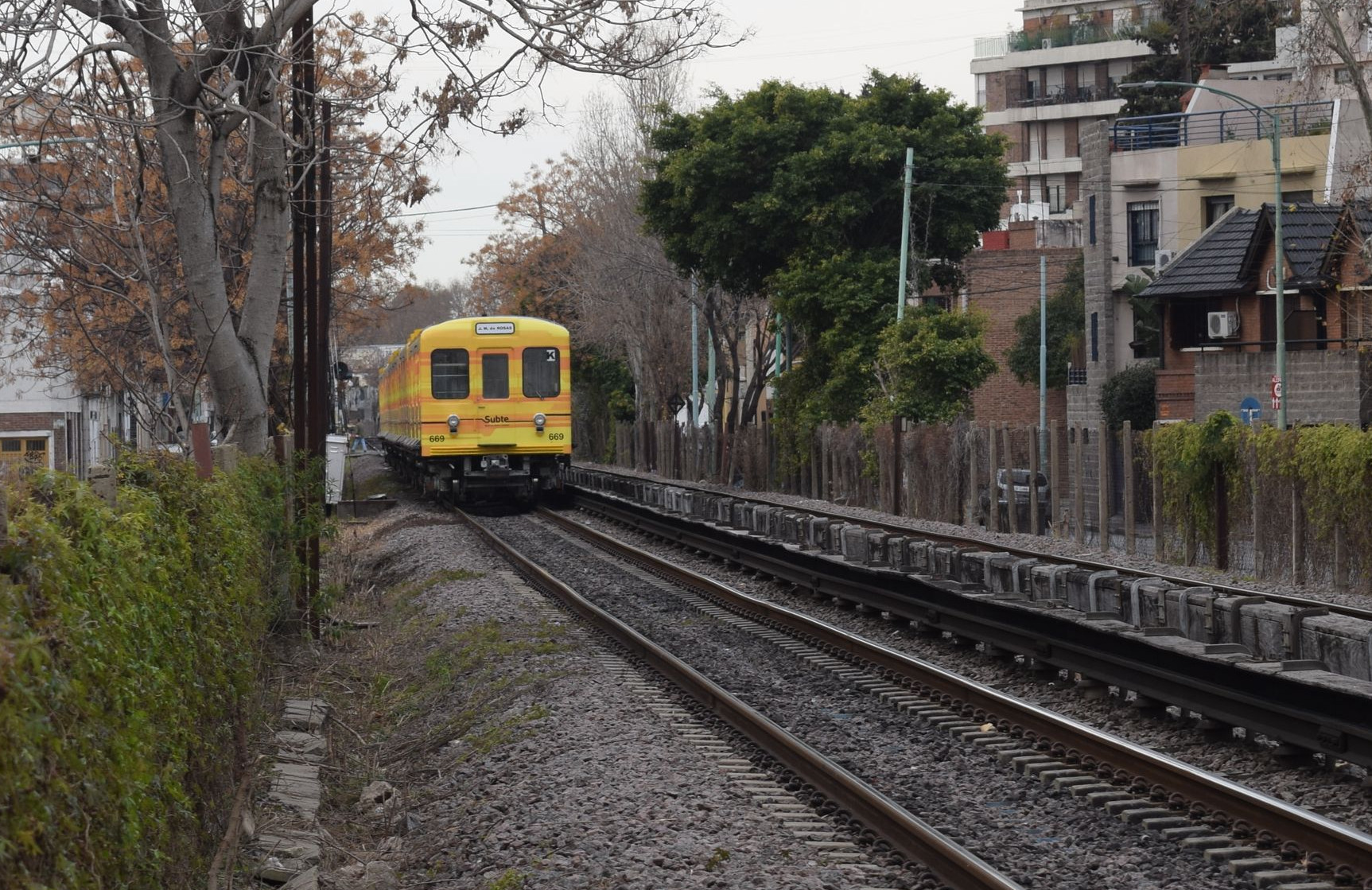
Underground Line B Eidan 500 stock on the line

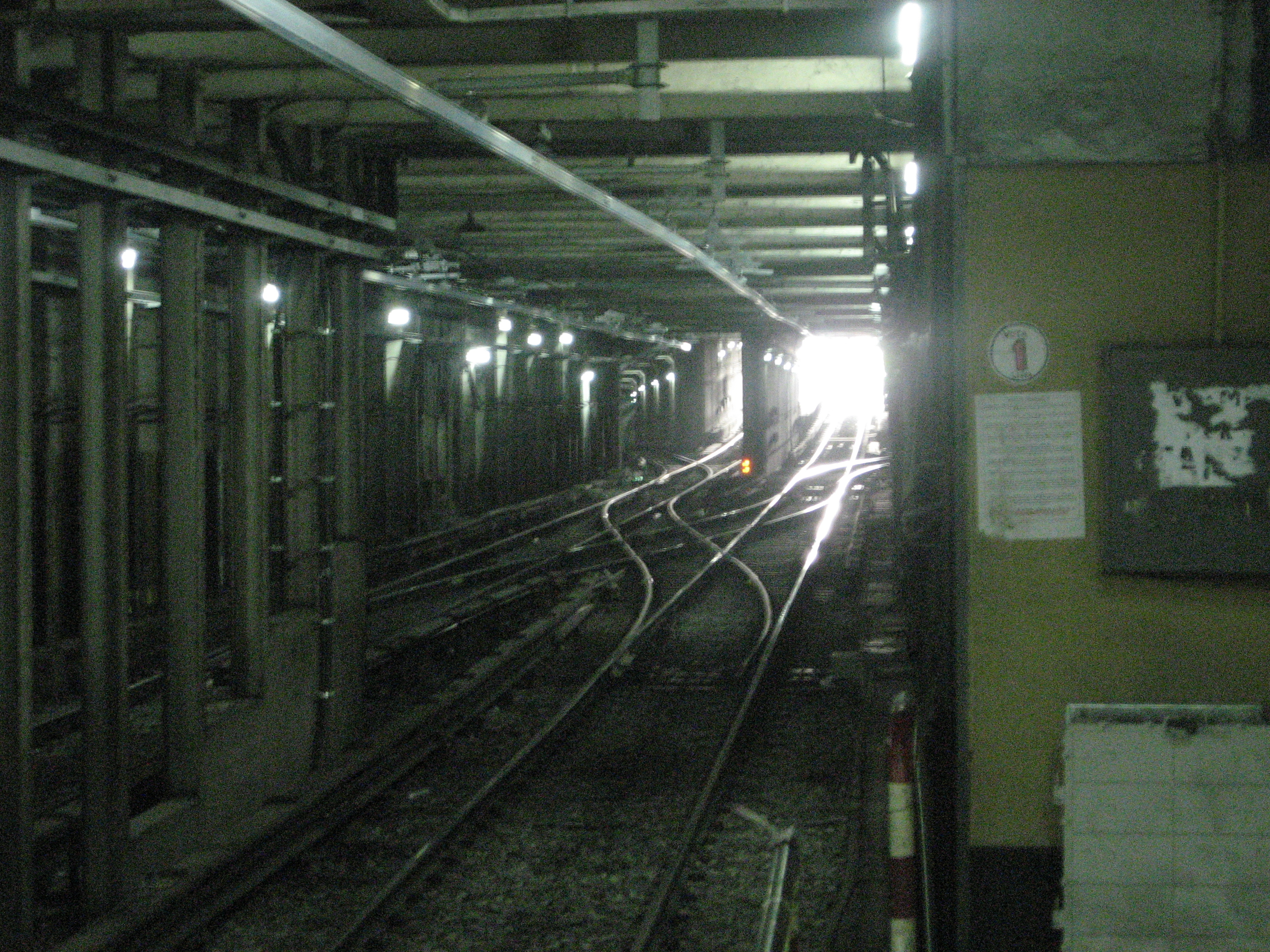
Access ramp from Federico Lacroze Underground station to the Urquiza Line

== See also ==
- Metrovías
- General Urquiza Railway
- Federico Lacroze
