= Belgrano Sur Line =

Commuter rail service in Buenos Aires

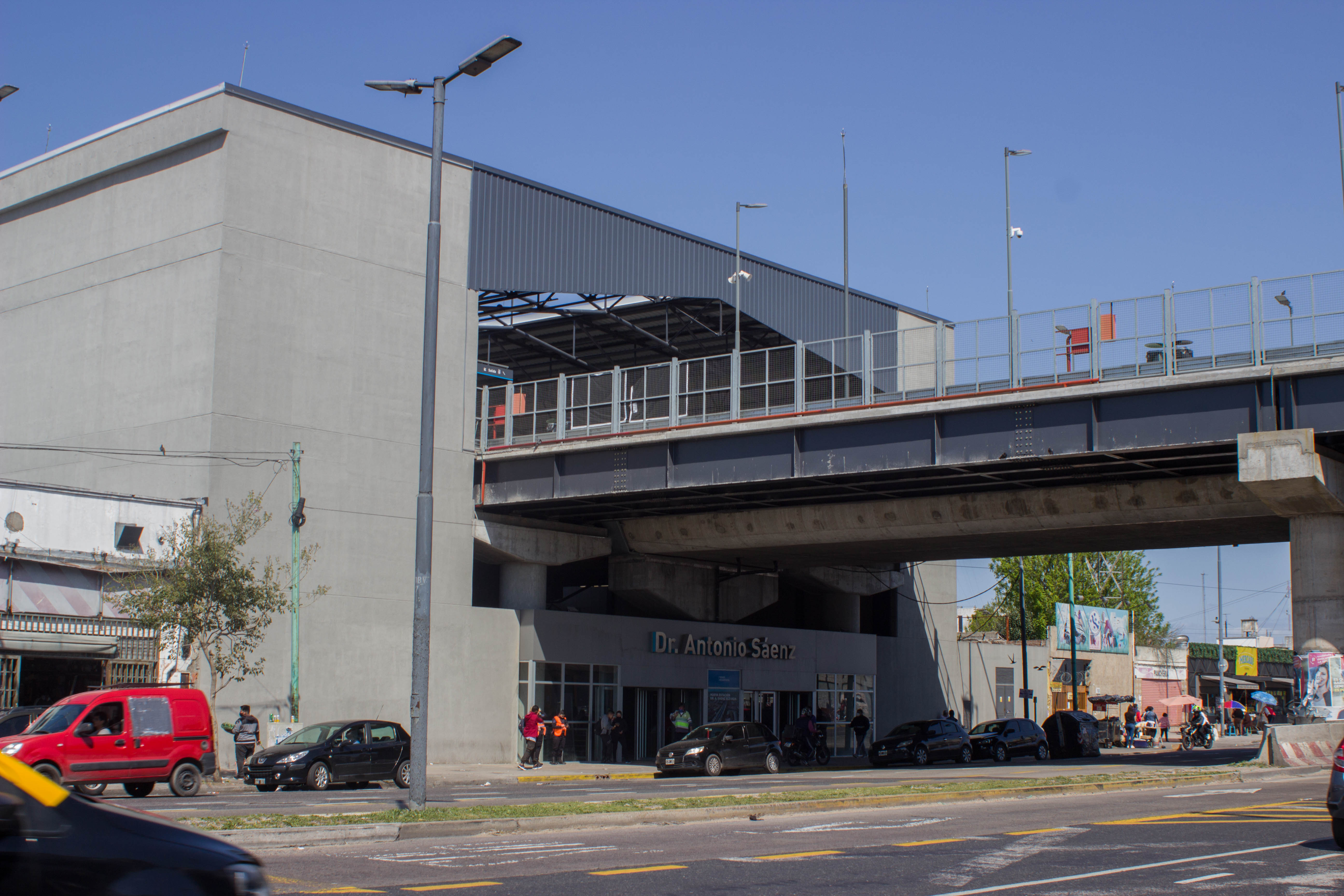
- Dr. Antonio Sáenz, current terminus, pictured in 2021

Overview
- Service type: Commuter rail
- Status: Active
- Locale: Greater Buenos Aires
- Predecessor: Cía. General BA; Midland
- First service: 1948; 78 years ago
- Current operator: Trenes Argentinos
- Former operator: Argentren
- Website: Belgrano Sur

Route
- Termini: Dr. A. Sáenz; Lozano; M. del Belgrano
- Stops: 29
- Average journey time: 70–77 minutes
- Service frequency: 20 minutes

Technical
- Track gauge: 1,000 mm (3 ft 3 3/8 in)
- Track owner: Government of Argentina
Route map
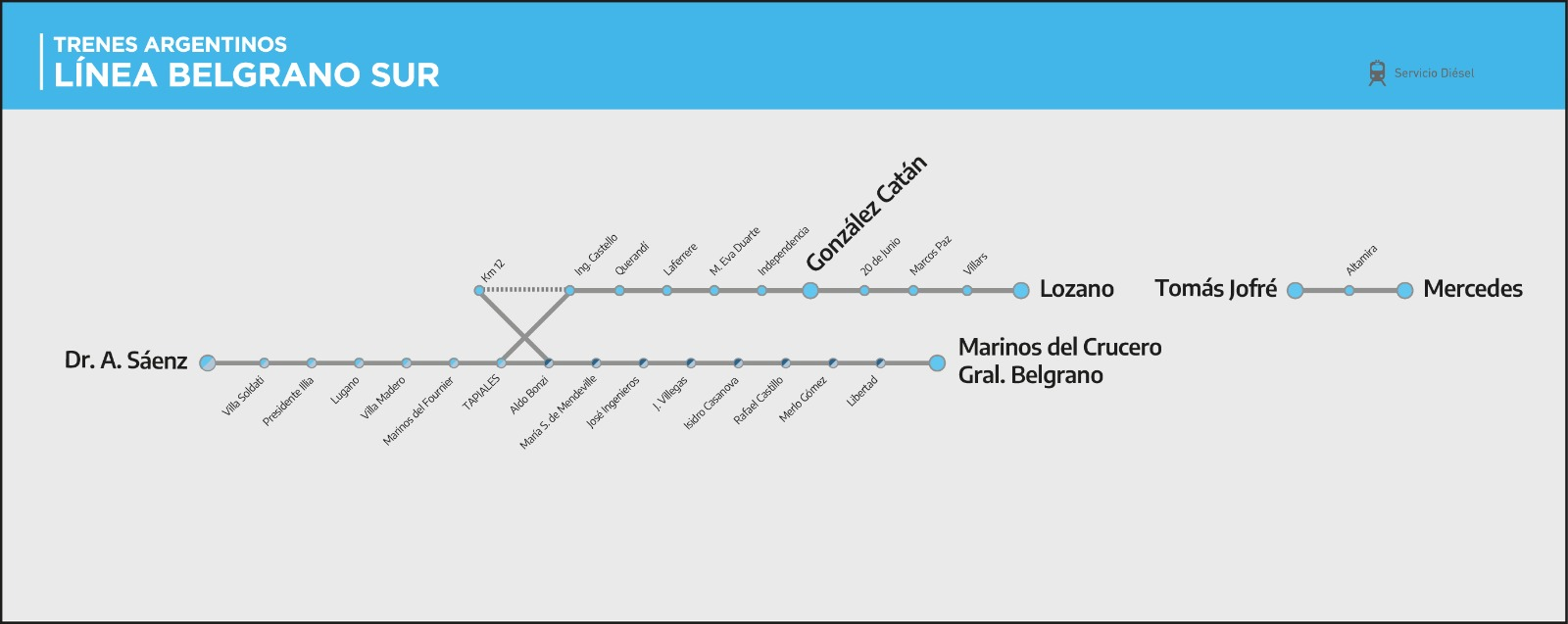

The Belgrano Sur line is an Argentine 1,000 mm (3 ft 3 3/8 in) metre gauge commuter rail service in the Greater Buenos Aires area, currently operated by state-owned enterprise Trenes Argentinos. The Belgrano Sur runs over tracks and through stations built by the Franco–Belgian-owned Compañía General de Buenos Aires and British Midland companies at the beginning of the 20th century.

The termini is Dr. A. Sáenz station in the Nueva Pompeya district of the autonomous city of Buenos Aires, with two branches, one to Lozano in General Las Heras Partido (departing from González Catán) and the other to Marinos del Crucero Gral. Belgrano in Merlo partido. The line also has a touristic service between Tomás Jofré and Mercedes.

Carrying just under 11 million passengers per year, the line is the least used of the Buenos Aires commuter rail network.

The railway line was originally built and operated by two companies, British-owned Buenos Aires Midland Railway that made its inaugural trip in 1909 joining Puente Alsina and Carhue, and Franco-Belgian-owned Compañía General de Buenos Aires (Established in 1908), that built and operated a large network reaching cities in the west of Buenos Aires province and branches to cities such as La Plata and Rosario, Although most of the line was closed and only a few services are active nowadays.

== History ==
=== Background ===
The railway line was originally built and operated by two companies, British-owned Buenos Aires Midland Railway (BA Midland) and Franco-Belgian-owned Compañía General de Buenos Aires (CGBA) (established in 1908). The first train on the British owned line made its inaugural trip in 1909 joining Puente Alsina and Carhué. CGBA built and operated a large network reaching cities in the west of Buenos Aires Province and branches to cities such as La Plata and Rosario, although most of the line has since been closed and only a few services still operate.

When the entire Argentine railway network was nationalised in 1948 during Juan Perón's presidency, the BA Midland became part of the Belgrano Sur line division of the General Belgrano Railway. Furthermore, the newly nationalised companies added to Ferrocarril Belgrano network were renamed, being known as "G" (Cía. Gral. de Buenos Aires), "M" (Midland) and "P(Province of Buenos Aires Railway).

=== Ferrocarriles Argentinos ===
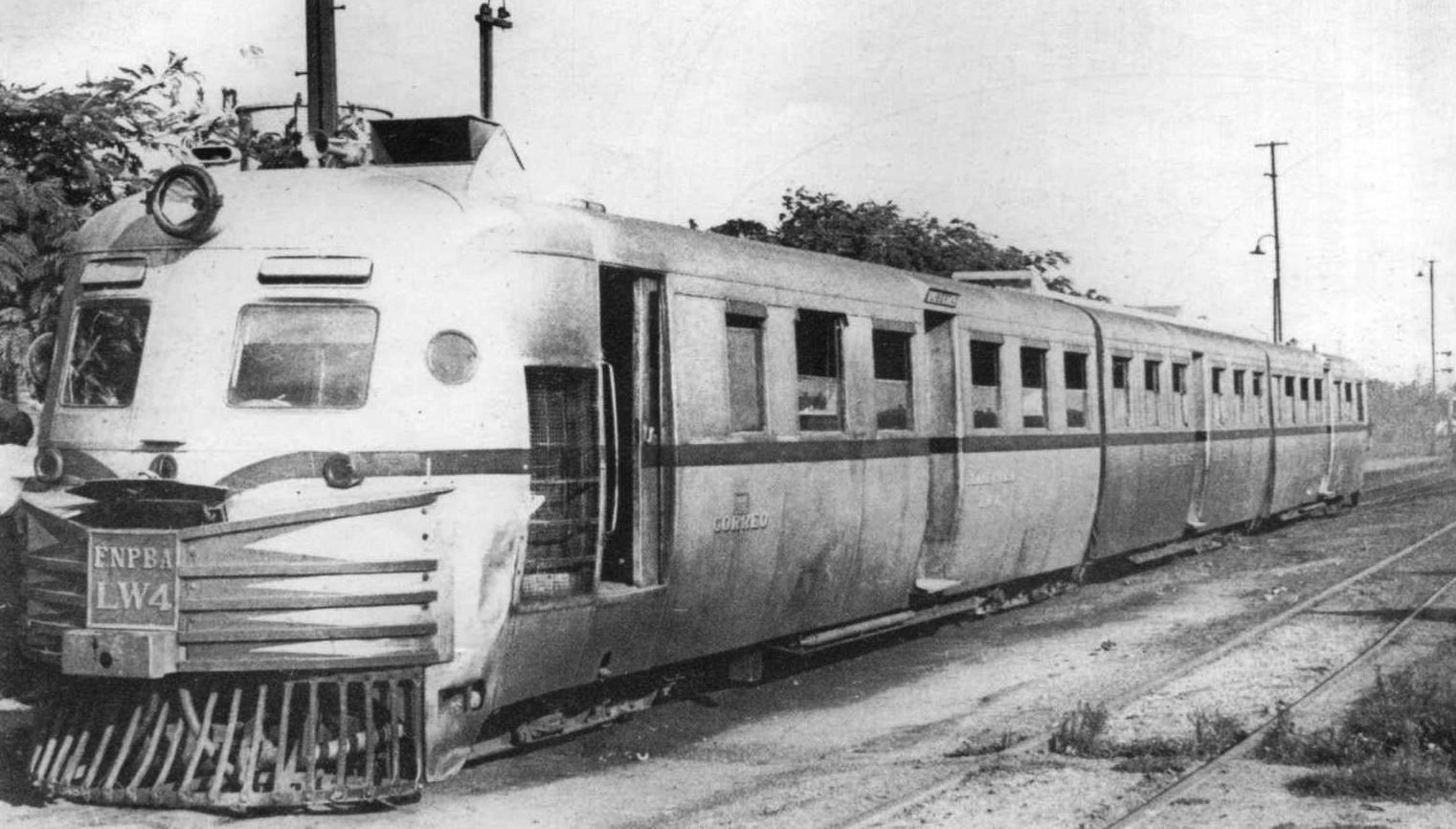
A Birmingham railcar in Tapiales, 1957

After the nationalisation, several improvements were carried out on the line, including an additional rail track between Aldo Bonzi and Libertad to increase the frequency of the services. The modernisation included the purchase of brand-new diesel locomotives manufactured by the American company Whitcomb in 1951 (with the addition of 15 new locomotives from the Dutch company Werkspoor in 1955) and the construction of junctions at the Tapiales and Aldo Bonzi stations that allowed the ex-BA Midland line to connect with the Sarmiento Railway near Haedo in Greater Buenos Aires.

During the 1950s, the increasing population in Greater Buenos Aires led the company to add more services. By December 1955, the Belgrano Railway ran more than 40 services per day along the Puente Alsina−Aldo Bonzi section. Nevertheless, the rolling stock had not been renewed since the 1930s and as a result, some railcars that had been damaged or destroyed in accidents were put out of service and were never replaced due to the lack of investment in purchasing new railcars.

In the late 1960s and early 1970s railcars manufactured by the Hungarian company Ganz Works were allocated to the Belgrano Sur. They had been acquired by the Argentine State Railway decades earlier and had been running on the northern Argentine railways since 1936. Some of them were used for local services to Libertad and the rest for the long-distance service to Carhué, departing from Buenos Aires station, the former Compañía Gral. de Buenos Aires terminus. The Ganz railcars ran services until 1977 when the line was definitively closed.

When the Libertad−Plomer section was closed, the ex-CGBA Buenos Aires station was made the terminus. Trains ran without passengers from Puente Alsina to Aldo Bonzi, running back to the Tapiales junction where they then went to the Buenos Aires station. Passengers waited and took the train in Buenos Aires, being carried to Carhué via Plomer. The lack of maintenance caused a progressive deterioration in the rolling stock and stations of the line. The line was closed in September 1977 and the workshops at Libertad were demolished.

On 2 March 1977, Decree N° 547 by de facto President of Argentina, Jorge Rafael Videla ordered the closure and dismantlement of more than 4,000 km of rail tracks. Several General Belgrano Railway lines were closed on 1 May 1977, although long-distance services to Carhué continued operating until August of that year when the last train ran to that city. Nevertheless, the closure of services in the region did not have a negative impact on the economy of the Province since the rail tracks ran through low-populated regions. Furthermore, most of that region was already served by other railway lines with better access to the city of Buenos Aires.

=== Privatisation: Metropolitano ===
With the railway privatisation in Argentina in the early 1990s, the Belgrano Sur line was granted in concession to the private company Metropolitano which started operations in 1994. However, the Government of Argentina revoked the contract of concession in 2007 due to poor service standards and increasing complaints from users. Until then, the concessionary had been receiving near $30 million in subsidies per month.

In the first years of private operation, many kilometres of the line were closed with stations and infrastructure abandoned. In spite of the large government subsidies received by TMB (the Metropolitano's subsidiary that operated the line) a serious decline in the standard of rail services led to the original concession being revoked. In 2007, the service was given in concession to the consortium Unidad de Gestión Operativa Ferroviaria de Emergencia (UGOFE).

=== Transition and new concession ===
The UGOFE took over the service until 12 February 2014, when it was announced that the Belgrano Sur and Roca lines would be granted to Argentren S.A., a company that was part of the Emepa Group and UGOFE was immediately dissolved.

=== Renationalisation and investment ===
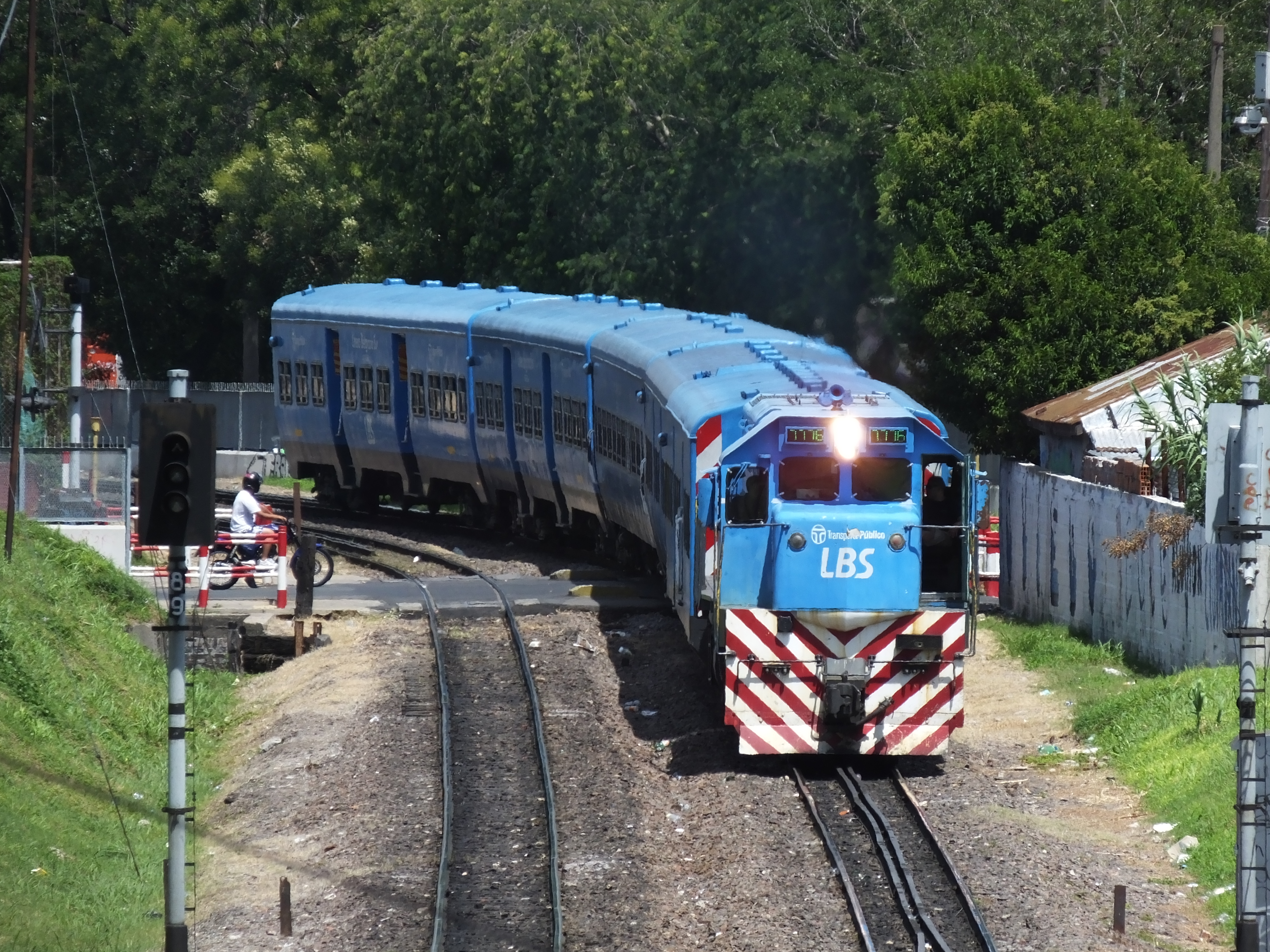
Diesel-electric rolling stock being phased-out of the line, 2015

The State-owned company Trenes Argentinos took over Belgrano Sur line (operated by Argentren) after the Government of Argentina rescinded the contracts signed with the company on 2 March 2015. The contract terms specified that the concession could be cancelled with no right to claim compensation. The agreements had been signed in February 2014, committing Argentren and Corredores Ferroviarios to operate the lines.

In September 2013, the Government of Argentina announced that 23 brand-new railcars were to be acquired from the Chinese company CNR Dalian. The first batch of the new rolling stock was expected to be available from May 2015 but only arrived in Buenos Aires in July. It was then announced that the new rolling stock had been would begin running on the Buenos Aires - Gonzalez Catán route in August. The other parts of the line received the new rolling stock before the end of 2015, as the railcars arrived in the country.

It was also announced that all the 28 stations of the line would be remodelled. The cost of the investment was estimated in A$ 1,200 million. The platforms of the stations would be elevated to match the height of the new rolling stock, while the track was being refurbished on the line, with the Buenos Aires - Tapiales segment receiving completely new rails on concrete sleepers. Twenty-four of the stations would be completely replaced using modular designs, while some single-track segments would be made into double-track segments.

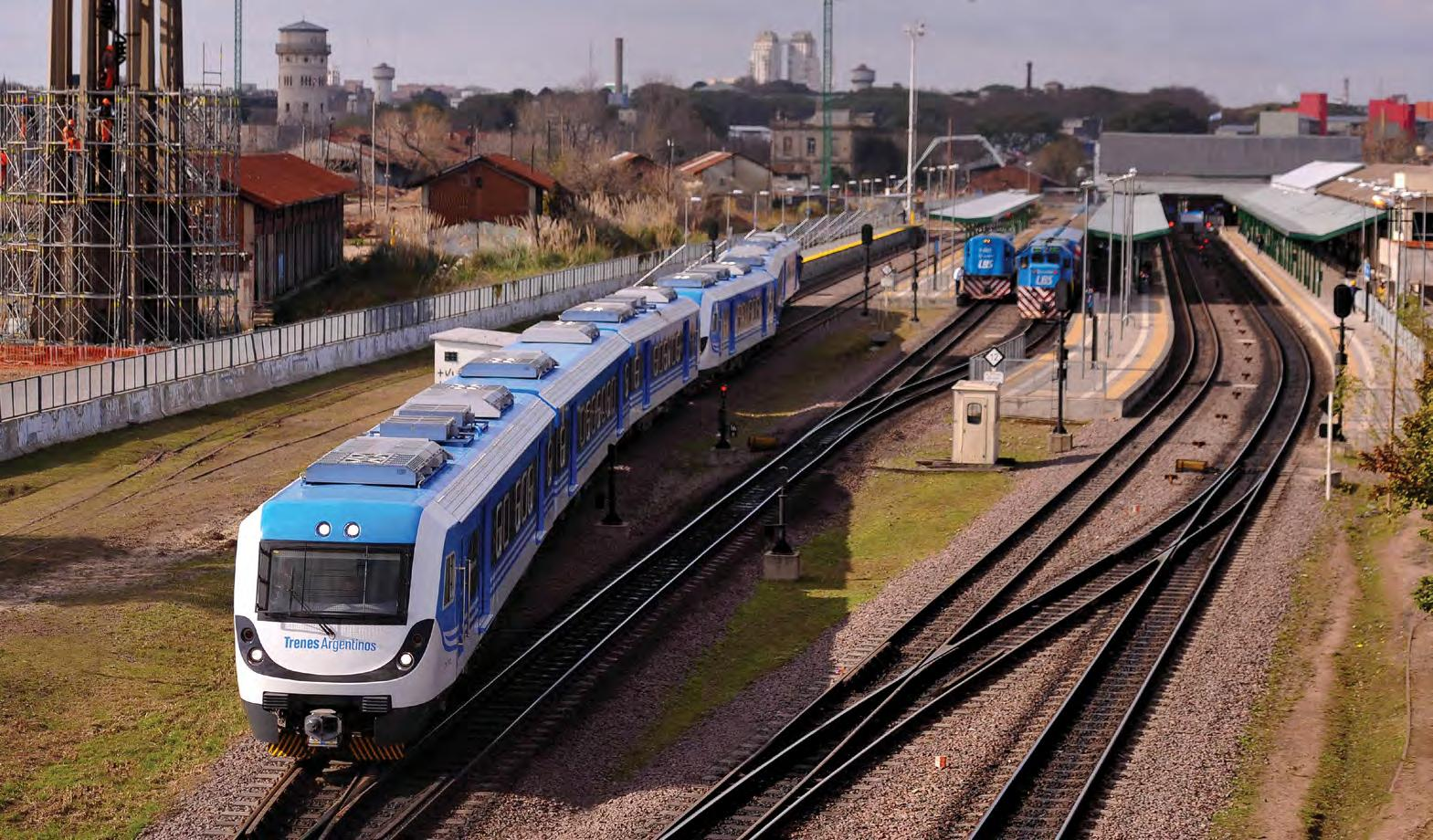
Six-car CNR DMU set leaving Buenos Aires station in 2015, when it was still the terminus. The station was closed in 2018.

In 2015, two important extension works were considered. To the southwest, the section from González Catán to Marcos Paz (closed at the time of privatisation) to be restored and reopened, extending that branch of the line after its 20-year closure whilst adding new overpasses and connecting the line with the Merlo–Lobos branch of the Sarmiento Line.

In August 2017, Trenes Argentinos suspended the Puente Alsina–Aldo Bonzi service due to a derailment near Puente Alsina station. Since then, the service has not been re-established. Because of that, the National Government ceded the lands occupied by the line to the Municipality of Lanús with the purpose of building a park there.

=== Extensions ===
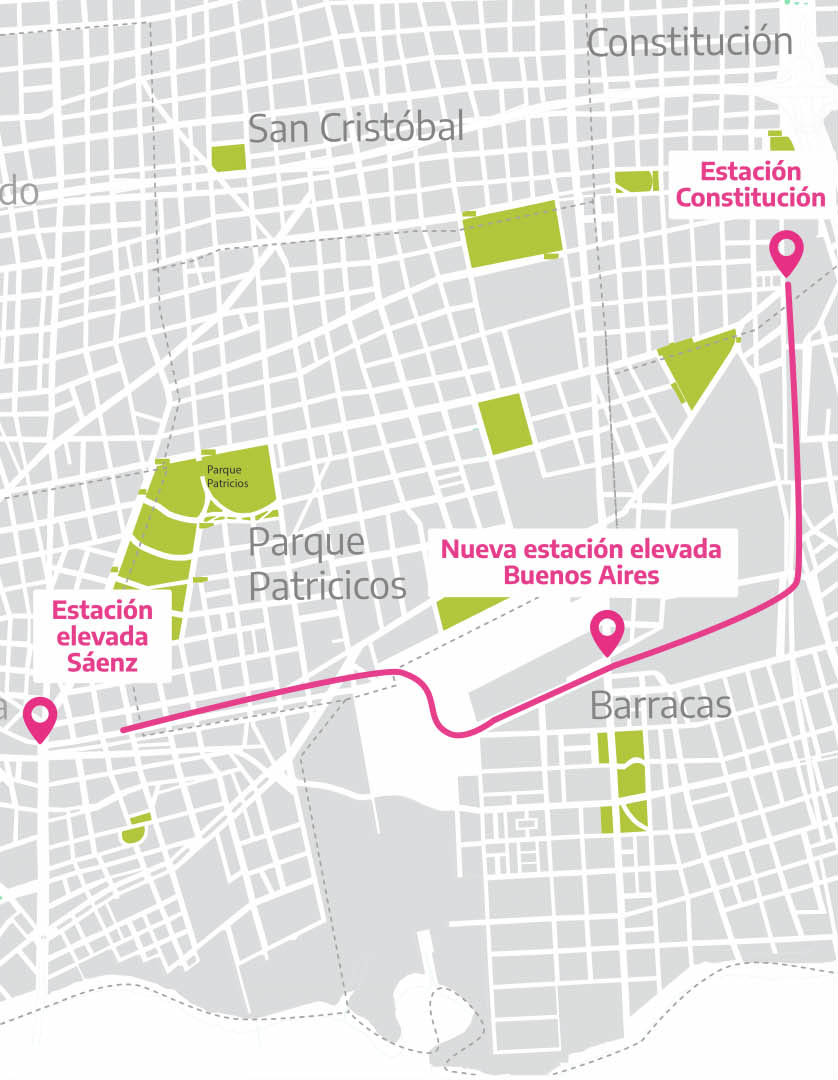
Map of the extension planned from Dr. Sáenz to Constitución station of Roca Line, as of July 2022

In 2015, it was announced that the Belgrano Sur Line would reach Roca Line's Constitución station through a viaduct that would connect both lines. The project, named "Centro de Trasbordo Constitución" (Constitución layover center), will allow near 65,000 Belgrano Sur passengers to access not only Roca Line trains but Buenos Aires Underground's Line C For that purpose, the Buenos Aires station was closed in May 2018, leaving Dr. Sáenz as new terminus of the line. The viaduct was built between Sáenz and Villa Soldati to avoid level crossings. A second stage of the project included to extend the viaduct to Plaza Constitución, connecting both lines, Belgrano Sur and Roca. As of September 2022, 35% of the works were completed, at a cost of US$119 million. The viaduct will have a total extension of 4.2 km. Projects also include the construction of a new "Buenos Aires" station, which will be elevated over Avenida Vélez Sársfield.

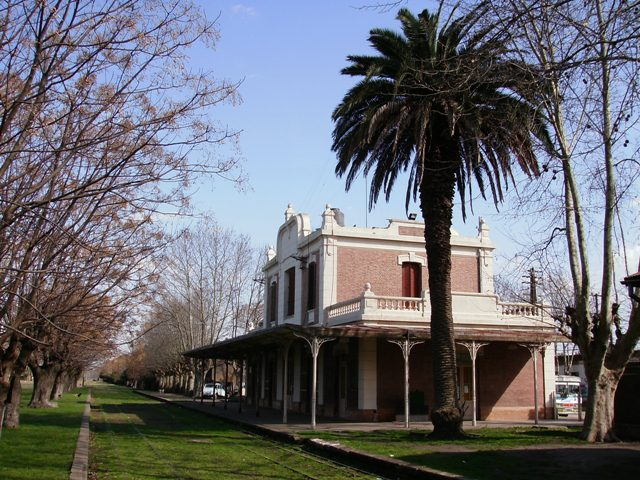
Villars station, reopened in 2022

In December 2019, the branch "G" was extended 9 km from González Catán to 20 de Junio in La Matanza Partido. Passenger trains had not stopped in 20 de Junio since 1993, when services were reduced to reduce costs.

In July 2021, the service was extended from González Catán to Marcos Paz in the Buenos Aires Province.

Trains resumed operations to Villars, a small town with 3,000 inhabitants in General Las Heras Partido, in December 2022, after the Government extended the service from Marcos Paz to that city. The service had been closed in 1993.

In May 2023, Trenes Argentinos announced a tourist train which would run from Mercedes to Tomás Jofré (with an intermediate stop in Altamira), all of them part of Mercedes Partido. The train was planned to run two services on Sundays, with an estimated time of 45'. For that purpose, Jofré and Altamira stations were completely refurbished, adding toilets and access ramps for disabled people. The service was officially inaugurated on May 27, and served by Emepa Alerce diesel railcars.

In October 2023, the González Catán–Villars branch was extended to Lozano, a locality in General Las Heras Partido. The service was re-opened only for weekends although Trenes Argentinos stated it could be extended to weekdays in a near future. The station had been closed in 1976. There are plans to extend the service to other towns of the region that were served by train in the past, such as Navarro.

== Historic operators ==
Companies that have operated the Belgrano Sur Line since it was established after the 1948 nationalisation are:

Operator	Period
Ferrocarriles Argentinos	1948–1991
FEMESA	1991–1994
Metropolitano	1994–2007
UGOFE	2007–2014
Argentren	2014–2015
Trenes Argentinos	2015–present

== Rolling Stock ==
In August 2015, the first diesel multiple units (DMUs) acquired from CNR Tangshan were put into service. This rolling stock consists of 81 cars, which make up a total of 27 DMUs composed of three cars each and were to be phased-in throughout the year until all the railcars were the Chinese-made DMUs.

Prior to the complete replacement of the existing rolling stock by the Chinese DMUs, the line consisted of a variety of diesel locomotives pulling carriages in a number of different combinations. The introduction of the new rolling stock has doubled the line's passenger capacity.

== Services ==
The Belgrano Sur line operates the following DMU services:

Start	End	Dist./Km.	Former company
Dr. A. Sáenz (Note: The original terminus, Buenos Aires station, was definitely closed in 2018 due to the construction of a viaduct. Therefore Dr. Sáenz became terminus of the line.) (Note: The Dr. Saenz-Marinos del Crucero General Belgrano line is limited between Tapiales and Marinos due to works.)	González Catán	30	Compañía General
Tapiales	Marinos del Crucero Gral. Belgrano	43	Midland
González Catán	Lozano	41	Compañía General

=== González Catán-Lozano line ===
Notes

== See also ==
- Midland Railway
- Compañía General de Buenos Aires
