= FEMESA =

Argentine state-owned company that operated commuter rail services in Buenos Aires

Ferrocarriles Metropolitanos S.A.
- Type: S.A.
- Industry: Rail transport
- Predecessor: Ferrocarriles Argentinos
- Founded: 1991
- Founder: Government of Argentina
- Defunct: 1997; 29 years ago
- Fate: Dissolved after concessions were granted
- Successor: Metropolitano; Ferrovías; TBA; Metrovías
- Headquarters: Argentina
- Area served: Buenos Aires Province
- Services: Maintenance
- Owner: Government of Argentina

Ferrocarriles Metropolitanos S.A. (also known for its acronym FEMESA) was a company set up by the Argentine government in 1991, during the presidency of Carlos Menem, to oversee the privatisation of commuter rail services within the city of Buenos Aires in Argentina. The company granted concessions to Metropolitano, Ferrovías, Metrovías, and Trenes de Buenos Aires for the operation of services which had previously been run by state-owned companies since the nationalisation of the railways in 1948. With its task complete, FEMESA was wound up in 1997.

== Overview ==
FEMESA was created in 1991 to take over commuter rail services that had been operated by state-owned Ferrocarriles Argentinos (FA). The company was established as a transitional entity until those services were granted as concessions to private operators. Meanwhile, FA operated middle and long-distance passenger services until 10 March 1993 when all those services were cancelled.

In 1994, FEMESA granted concessions to Metropolitano which, through three subsidiary companies, took over the operation of services on the Línea San Martín, Línea Roca and Belgrano Sur Line in Buenos Aires previously operated by the state-owned San Martín, Roca and Belgrano Railway divisions, respectively. In spite of Metropolitano receiving large government subsidies, its services deteriorated to a point where, by 2007, the three concessions had all been revoked and their operation was taken over by the consortium Unidad de Gestión Operativa Ferroviaria de Emergencia (UGOFE).

Concessions were also granted in 1994 to Ferrovías and Metrovías, for the operation of services on the Belgrano Norte and Urquiza Lines, respectively, previously operated by the state-owned Belgrano, and Urquiza divisions of FA.

Finally, in 1995, concessions were granted to Trenes de Buenos Aires for the operation of services over the Mitre and Sarmiento Lines, previously operated by the state-owned Mitre and Sarmiento divisions of FA.

With all the commuter rail services in Buenos Aires privatised, FEMESA was wound up in 1997.
