= Unidad de Gestión Operativa Ferroviaria de Emergencia =

Former Argentine railway company (2005–2014)

Unidad de Gestión Operativa Ferroviaria de Emergencia (UGOFE)

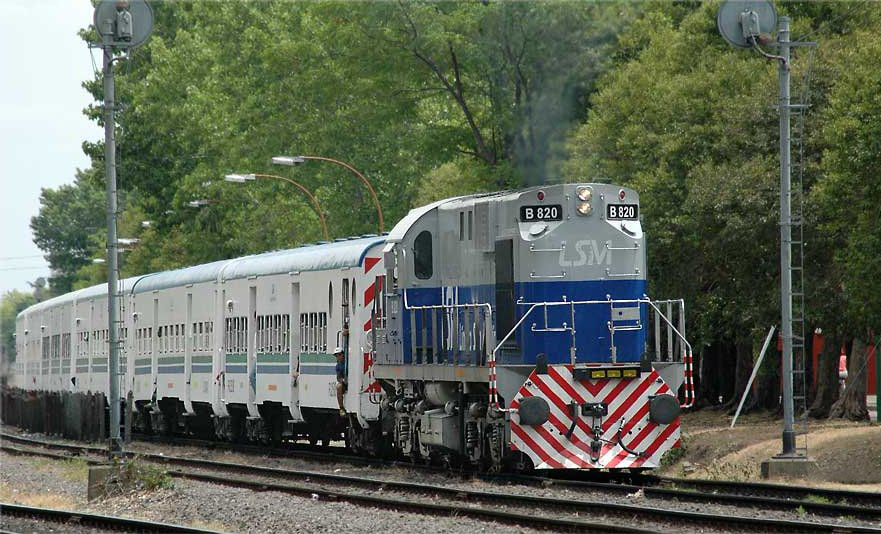
- A San Martín Line train with the logo "LSM".
- Type: State-owned
- Industry: Public transport
- Predecessor: Metropolitano
- Founded: 2005
- Founder: Government of Argentina
- Defunct: 2014; 12 years ago
- Fate: Dissolved
- Successor: Corredores Ferroviarios; Argentren
- Headquarters: Argentina
- Area served: Buenos Aires Province
- Services: Railway maintenance
- Parent: Government of Argentina
- Divisions: LGR (Roca Line); LSM (San Martín Line); LBS (Belgrano Sur Line)
- Website: Ugofe.com.ar

Unidad de Gestión Operativa Ferroviaria de Emergencia (UGOFE) was a temporary consortium of Argentine companies formed on 7 January 2005 by Ferrovías, Metrovías and Trenes de Buenos Aires to take over the running of commuter railway services in Buenos Aires after concessions granted to Metropolitano in 1994 for the operation of these services were revoked.

Metropolitano, a company formed in 1994 to take over rail concessions granted by the Argentine government, as part of railway privatisation during the presidency of Carlos Menem, operated commuter rail services over Línea San Martín, Línea Roca and Línea Belgrano Sur in Buenos Aires which had previously been run by state-owned companies since nationalisation of the railways in 1948. In spite of the large state subsidies received by the company, a serious decline in the standard of its services led to the concession for the San Martin Line being revoked in 2004 and to these services being taken over by the newly formed UGOFE. When concessions for the other two Lines were revoked in 2007, UGOFE assumed control of these services as well.

== History ==
The UGOFE was established as an S.A., or limited liability company, on January 7, 2005 through a consortium formed by Ferrovías, Metrovías and Trenes de Buenos Aires (the companies operating the urban services in Buenos Aires Province) with the purpose of taking over the San Martín line until the Government of Argentina gave it in concession to a private company.

The salaries of UGOFE employees were paid by the Government through the Ferrocarril Belgrano S.A., a freight rail company that had been separated from Ferrocarriles Argentinos. On May 22, 2007, when the Government revoked the contract to operate the Roca and Belgrano Sur lines, the UGOFE took over those lines temporarily on June 7 that year.

On May 24, 2012, the contract with TBA to operate the Mitre and Sarmiento lines was revoked after the Once station rail disaster. Both lines were temporarily operated by a consortium formed by Ferrovías and Metrovías, being TBA excluded from UGOFE a few days later.

On February 12, 2014, the Government of Argentina announced that some companies would take over the lines operated by UGOFE. The consortium was officially dissolved.

== Chronology ==
Line	Branch	Period
Roca (LGR)	Constitución-La Plata (by Quilmes); Constitución-Ezeiza-Cañuelas; Constitución-Glew-Alejandro Korn; Constitución-Bosques (by Quilmes); Constitución-Bosques-J.M Gutiérrez (by Temperley); Temperley-Haedo; Constitución-Claypole; Constitución-Gral. Alvear (Interurban); La Plata-Policlínico (University train)	2007–2014
San Martín (LSM)	Retiro-Pilar	2005–2014
Belgrano Sur (LBS)	Puente Alsina-Aldo Bonzi; Buenos Aires-González Catán; Buenos Aires-Marinos Cruc. Belgrano	2007–2014
