= Metropolitano =

Privately owned Argentinian railway consortium formed in 1994

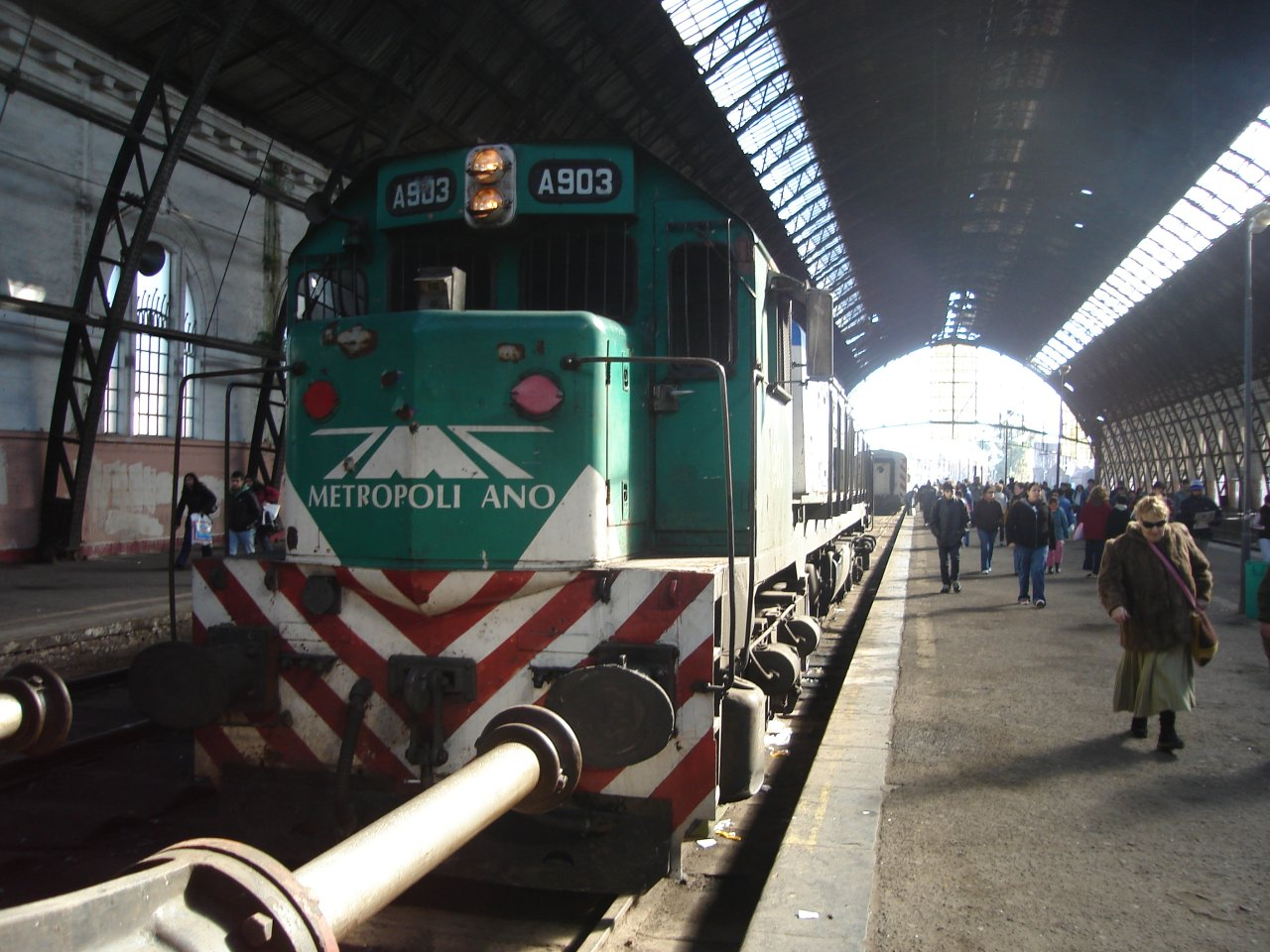
- An EMD GT-22CW locomotive in La Plata.
- Company type: Private
- Industry: Rail transport
- Predecessor: FEMESA
- Founded: 1994
- Defunct: 2007; 19 years ago
- Fate: Defunct
- Successor: UGOFE
- Headquarters: Buenos Aires, Argentina
- Area served: Buenos Aires Province
- Services: Passenger transport
- Subsidiaries: TMS, TMR, TMB

Metropolitano S.A. was a privately owned consortium formed in 1994 to take over concessions granted by the Argentine government as part of railway privatisation during the presidency of Carlos Menem for the operation of commuter rail services in the Buenos Aires Province. Metropolitano operated the San Martín, Roca and Belgrano Sur lines until 2007.

== History ==
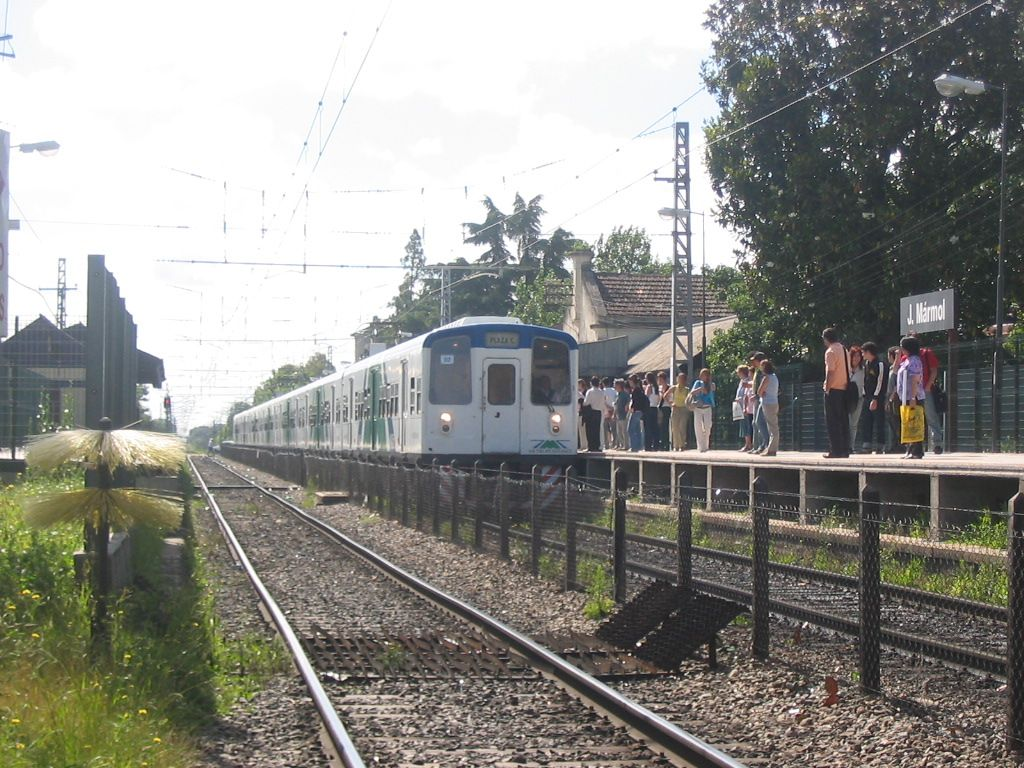
A Toshiba electric multiple unit arriving José Mármol, 2004.

Passenger services on San Martín, Roca and Belgrano Sur lines had previously been run by state-owned company Ferrocarriles Argentinos since nationalisation of the railways in 1948 and then by FEMESA (a provisional company that operated metropolitan train services until the process of privatisation was carried out).

The services run by Metropolitano started from termini in or near the city centre and were operated out into Greater Buenos Aires by the following subsidiary companies named "Transportes Metropolitanos":

Subsidiary	Line operated	Operation date
TMS	San Martín	1/4/1994 - 7/1/2005
TMR	Roca	1/1/1995 - 22/5/2007
TMB	Belgrano Sur	1/5/1994 - 22/5/2007

In spite of these companies receiving large government subsidies, their services deteriorated to a point where Metropolitano was repeatedly reported by the users, causing the Government of Argentina to fine the company several times.

Finally, in 2004 the concession for the operation of Línea San Martín was revoked through National Decree N° 798.

A violent protest of users in Constitución station on 15 May 2007 led to the revocation of the contract of concession that same year through Decrees 591 and 592.

After the concession was revoked, the three railway lines were taken over by the consortium UGOFE, formed by private companies Ferrovías, Metrovías and Trenes de Buenos Aires.
