= Barrio Echesortu =

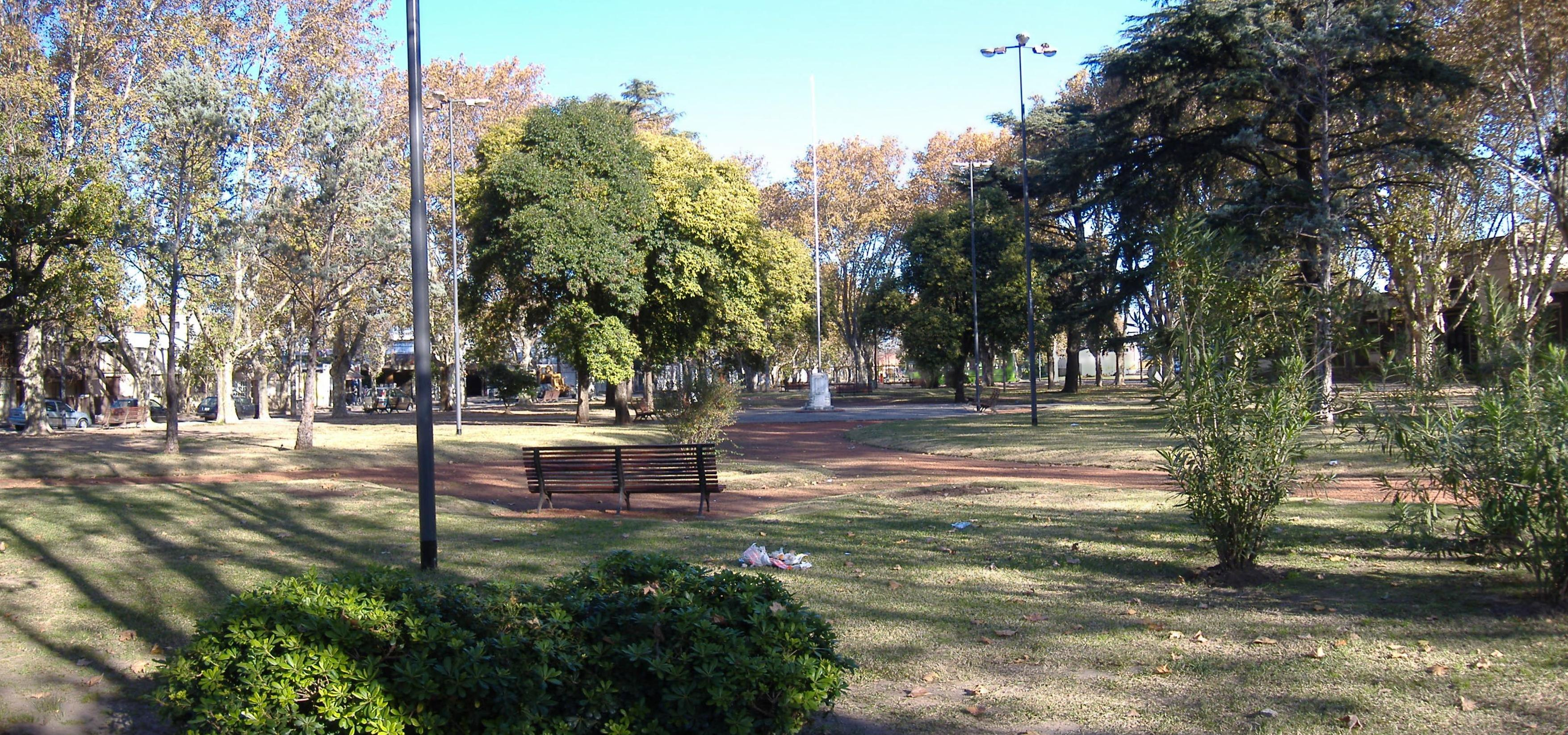
Plaza Ciro Echesortu, Paraná St. & 9 de Julio St.

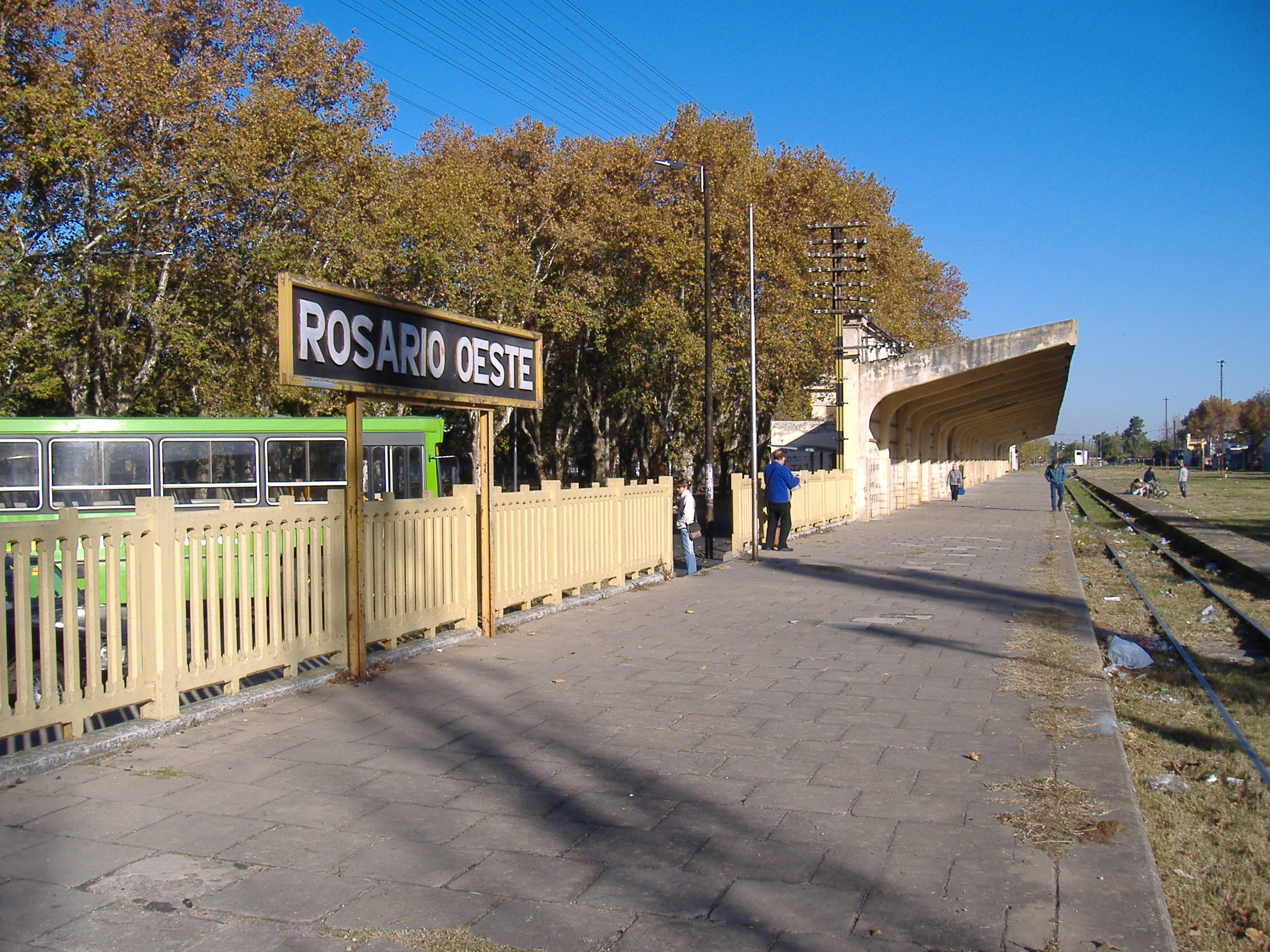
Rosario Oeste Station

Echesortu is a barrio (neighborhood) in Rosario, Argentina. It is unofficially known by that name even though, from the administrative point of view, its name is Remedios Escalada de San Martín. The neighborhood was formerly a town on its own, named after Ciro Echesortu, the original owner of the land; it was absorbed into the city later.

== Geography ==
Echesortu is located near the geographical center of the city. Its limits are:

- West: Paraná St., railways of the former Ferrocarril General Manuel Belgrano railway company;
- East: Francia Avenue;
- North: Tucumán St.;
- South: Pellegrini Avenue.

The major streets within the barrio are Mendoza St., Avellaneda Boulevard, and Córdoba St. (which becomes Eva Perón Avenue south of Avellaneda). Important landmarks include San Francisco Solano Church, San Miguel Church, Pestalozzi School, Plaza Buratovich, Plaza Ciro Echesortu and, opposite it, the abandoned Rosario Oeste Station of the Ferrocarril Belgrano.
