= Córdoba and Rosario Railway =

British-owned railway company that operated in Argentina

Córdoba & Rosario Railway
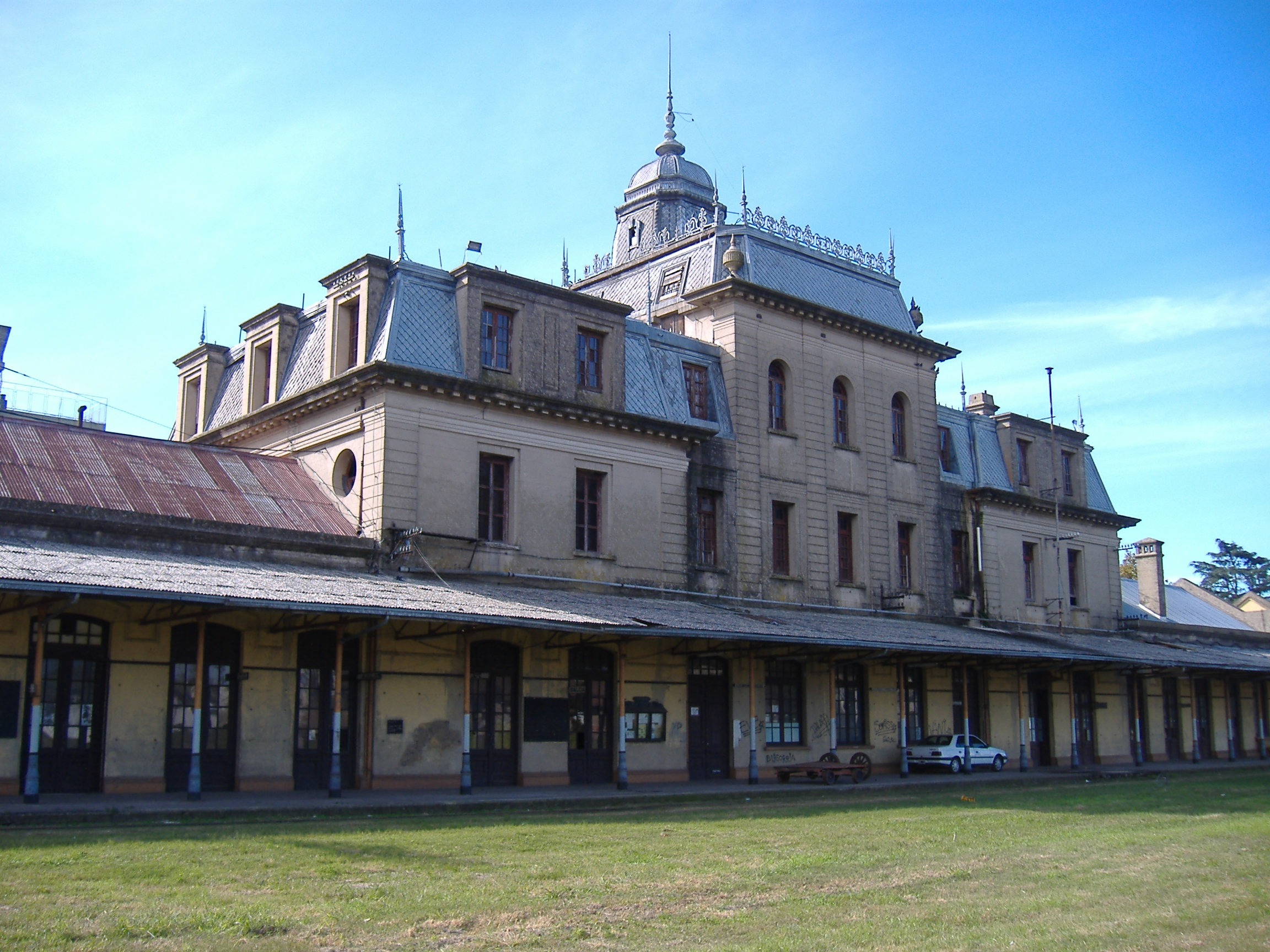
- Rosario (Central Córdoba), terminus.

Overview
- Native name: Ferrocarril Córdoba y Rosario
- Status: Defunct company (merged to Córdoba Central Railway in 1913)
- Locale: Córdoba & Santa Fe
- Termini: San Francisco; Rafaela

Service
- Type: Inter-city

History
- Opened: 1890
- Closed: 1913; 113 years ago

Technical
- Line length: 290 km (180 mi)

The Córdoba & Rosario Railway (C&R) (in Spanish: Ferrocarril Córdoba y Rosario) was a British-owned railway company, founded in 1889, that operated a 1,000 mm (3 ft 3 3/8 in) metre gauge railway network in Santa Fe Province, Argentina. The company was sold to the Córdoba Central Railway (CC) in 1912.

The C&R was founded in 1889 to acquire a concession, granted to William Temple in 1886 by the province of Santa Fe, for the construction of a line, 222 km long, from the river port of Rosario to San Francisco which would provide a link with the CC which had completed the building of a line from Córdoba to San Francisco the previous year.

The section from San Francisco to Rafaela, later to be known as the "Rafaela Steam Tramway", was finished in 1890 and a year later the Rosario to Frontera line was completed. It was now possible to operate through trains from Rosario north to Tucumán via San Francisco and Córdoba in conjunction with the Córdoba Central. Once the CC had completed the construction of a line from Buenos Aires to Rosario in 1912 through trains could reach Tucumán from the capital for the first time.

Close collaboration between the two companies led finally to the purchase of the Córdoba & Rosario by the CC in 1913.

Finally the Córdoba Central would be added to Ferrocarril Belgrano network after all the Argentine railways were nationalised in 1948.

== Bibliography ==
- British Railways in Argentina 1857-1914: A Case Study of Foreign Investment by Colin M. Lewis, Athlone Press (for the Institute of Latin American Studies, University of London) (1983)
- British Railways in Argentina 1860-1948 by H.R. Stones - P.E. Waters & Associates, Bromley, Kent - England (1993)
