= Erminio Blotta =

Argentine self-taught sculptor of Italian origin

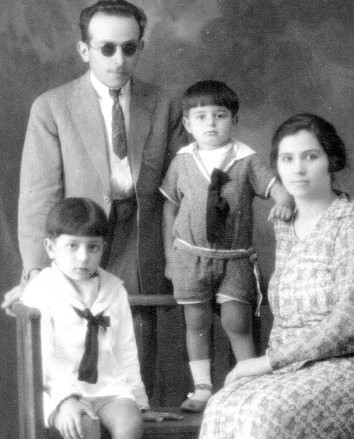
Erminio Blotta and his family, c.1925.

Erminio Blotta (8 November 1892 – 23 January 1976) was an Argentine self-taught sculptor of Italian origin.

== Biography ==
He was born in Morano Calabro (province of Cosenza, Calabria). His birth certificate records his name as Erminio Antonio Blotta Mainieri, but his Argentine identity papers have Carmen Erminio Blotta instead.

Blotta's family came to his adoptive country when he was only a child, at the beginning of 1894, during a major wave of Italian immigration to Argentina. They settled in Rosario, Santa Fe Province, about 280 km northwest of Buenos Aires. Two of his father's brothers were already living in Argentina, in the town which would then be called Lucio V. López, 40 km north-west of Rosario. Blotta was the eldest of nine siblings.

He was an apprentice worker in the Ferrocarril Central Argentino railway company, where he developed his basic sculpting skills by modelling figurines with clay. He then worked in a medal workshop with Marcos Vanzo, and modelled plaques and funeral portraits. In 1909 he studied with sculptor José Nardi.

At only 17 he travelled to Montevideo, Uruguay, where he stayed for one year (1909–1910) and then another year in Buenos Aires (1911–1912). He returned to Rosario, and with the assistance of his friends and the financial support of an amateur art fan he opened an exhibition gallery and presented his first bass-reliefs in bronze. He lived for four years in conventillos (cheap pensions), until in 1915 he managed to get a piece of land and set up a workshop, where several of his friends lived, at the expense of surgeon Artemio Zeno. He came in contact with many other poor intellectuals and artists (poets, painters, sculptors) and with the anarchist movement.

== Blindness ==
In November 1917, while he was finishing his monument to Juan Bautista Alberdi, a chip of marble (which was being worked by his assistant) broke Blotta's glasses, and glass splinters wounded both his eyes. He spent several months completely deprived of sight, until he was operated by surgeon Dr. Pedro Lagleyze. He only recovered the sight of his left eye. Blotta would later thank the physician with a sculpture.

Dr. Lagleyze sent him to recover at a friend's house in Villeta, 30 km south of Asunción, Paraguay. Blotta did not find the person he was looking for, but instead met the father of Paraguayan artist Modesto Delgado Rodas, who took him in as a guest. In Villeta, Blotta also met Carmen de Jesús Prieto Ruiz, a young schoolteacher and a few months later, on 4 September 1918, he married her.

During his stay, he collected aboriginal Tupi-Guarani art, and created some works that can be found still in several cities of Paraguay. Years later he was declared Honorary Citizen of Paraguay. In 1970, six years before his death, Blotta confessed in a newspaper that his most fervent wish would be to die a Paraguayan.

== Family ==
Blotta moved back to Rosario in mid-1920, after learning that his study had been robbed. His first son, Herminio, was born at that time. He moved several times until finally settling in a house on 3160 Marcos Paz St. (in Barrio Echesortu). He had five other children, the last of whom (a daughter) died as a baby. His residence gradually became the home of his Paraguayan in-laws.

== Artistic work ==
Blotta was the literary commentator of the Buenos Aires newspaper La Nación, for which he wrote regularly, between the 1910s and the 1930s. His contributions were signed as "Herminio Blotta".

In his youth Blotta worked on marble and stone, besides clay, but in the mid-1920s he started producing less marble busts and tends to produce more works in clay, then cast in bronze. There are records (especially from La Capital newspaper) of more than 200 works of this type.

Blotta also worked as a draftsman in the Ports Direction of Rosario, and collaborated as a plaster artisan in the scale model of the thalweg of the Paraná River. Additionally, he earned a living with funeral art, producing (for example) several hundreds of bronze objects for headstones, often with his colleague Pedro Cresta (1912–1970).

In his old age the Municipality of Rosario granted him a special pension for his artistic labors. Erminio Blotta died surrounded by his family in Rosario, in 1976, at the age of 83.

== Legacy ==
Works by Erminio Blotta can be found in the Argentine provinces of Santa Fe, Buenos Aires, Mendoza, Córdoba, Tucumán, Entre Ríos (specifically in Concepción del Uruguay), and Chaco (in the capital city, Resistencia), as well as in Santiago de Compostela, Spain, and in the Mefalsim kibbutz in Israel.

In 1978 a minor street in Rosario was renamed Escultor Blotta (Sculptor Blotta). It is a one-block passage formerly known as Pasaje Mercado, located 250 m from Blotta's monument to J. B. Alberdi.
