= Rosario Central Córdoba railway station =

Former railway station in Rosario, Argentina

Coordinates: 32°58′9.2281″S 60°38′11.8284″W

Rosario (Central Córdoba)
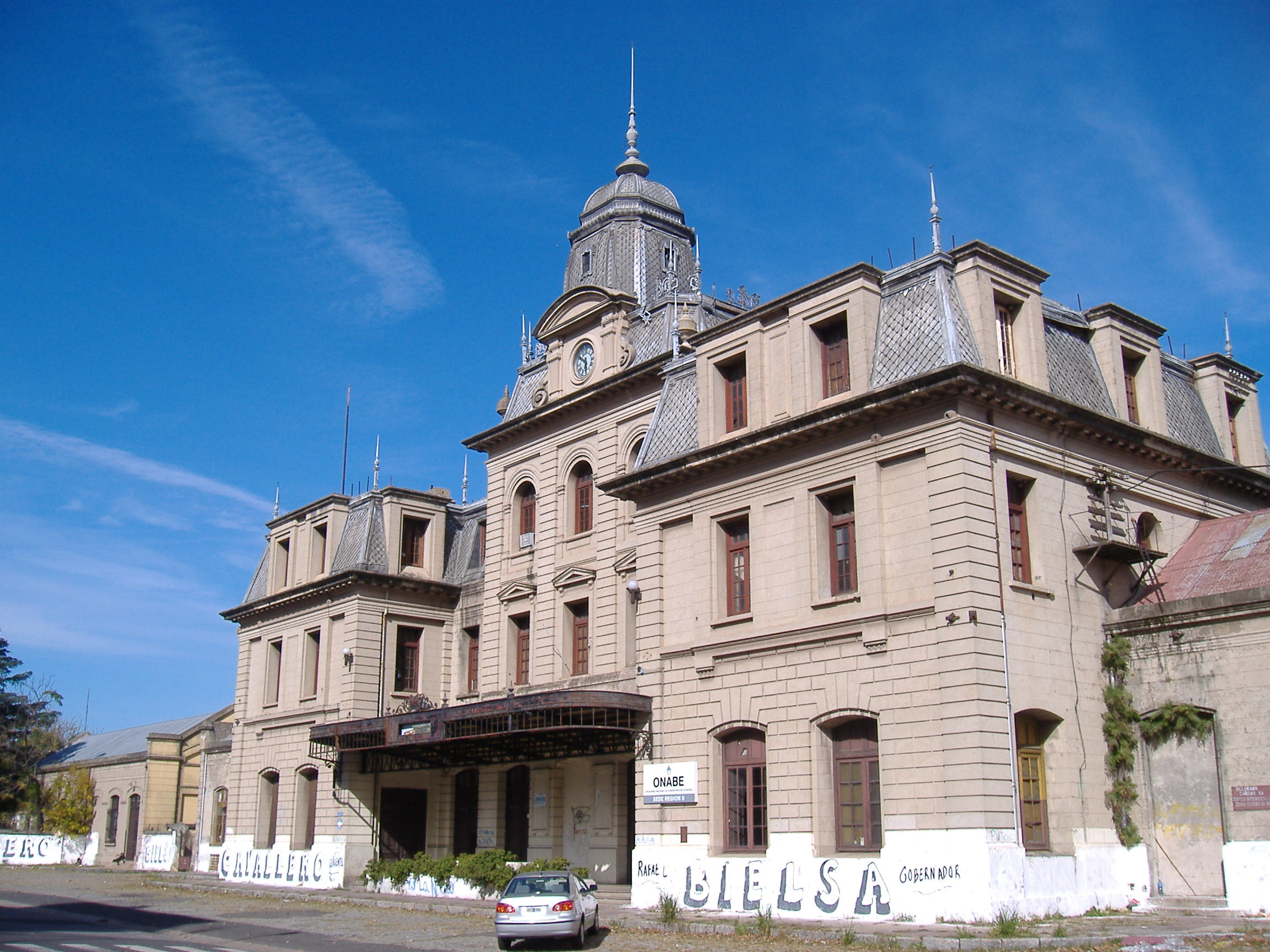
- Facade of the station, as of 2007

General information
- Location: 27 de Febrero and J.M. de Rosas; Rosario; Argentina
- System: Inter-city
- Operator: Trenes Argentinos Cargas (last)
- Line: Belgrano

History
- Opened: 1888; 138 years ago
- Closed: 2015; 11 years ago
Location

Rosario (Central Córdoba) is a railway station in Rosario, Santa Fe, Argentina. It is located at the junction of 27 de Febrero Boulevard and Juan Manuel de Rosas St., south of the city center.

The station was part of the Córdoba Central Railway (then added to Belgrano Railway network). Closed for passenger services since 1952, it was operated by freight rail transport company Trenes Argentinos Cargas until 2015.

== History ==
The station served as a terminus of the Córdoba and Rosario Railway company, which laid down its first rails in 1888. The line went north to the city of Rafaela and then to Córdoba. In 1912, the company merged with the Córdoba Central Railway.

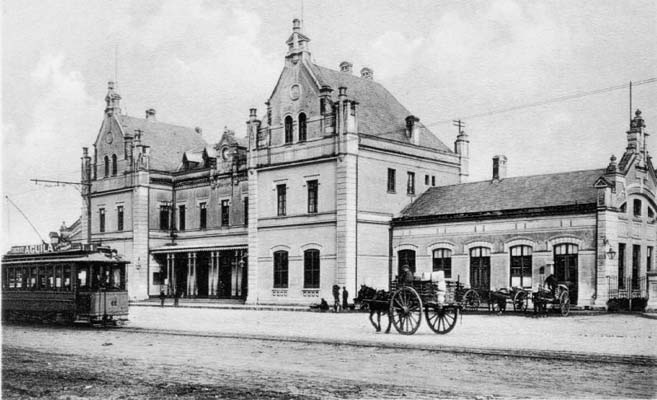
The original station building construction in the 1900s, before it was destroyed by a fire and rebuilt with significant changes

The central block of the Rosario station was completely destroyed by a fire on 31 December 1921. The reconstruction of the building started almost immediately. It ended in 1926 with the construction of a characteristic cupola (dome-shaped vault), which has been preserved until the present.

When the government of Juan Perón nationalized the railways in Argentina on 1 March 1948 and reconfigured the lines, the state-owned company Ferrocarriles Argentinos took over the Córdoba Central Railway. It shut down the passenger services handled by Rosario (Córdoba Central) and other stations, concentrating all of it at Rosario Oeste. Rosario Central Córdoba remained active for freight services only.

Starting in 2005, the terrains surrounding the station were employed to create an urban park ("Parque Hipólito Yrigoyen"). As part of the renewal of the area, the station was restored.

The station's building was also seat of the Asociación Rosarina Amigos del Riel (Rosario's Friends of the Rail Association), a railway advocacy and research non-profit organization. In August 2015, it was announced that the Argentine state will invest A$ 15 million in the refurbishment of the building.

Besides, the Government of Santa Fe plans to open a tram service between Rosario and Granadero Baigorria, with Rosario Central Córdoba as an intermediate stop.

== Historic operators ==
Companies that operated the Rosario (CC) train station since its inauguration were:

Operator	Period
(United Kingdom) Córdoba and Rosario Railway	1886–1912
(United Kingdom) Córdoba Central Railway	1912–1948
(Argentina) Ferrocarriles Argentinos	1948–1993
(Argentina) Trenes Argentinos Cargas	2013–2015

== Bibliography ==
- British Railways in Argentina 1860–1948 by H. R. Stones, P. E. Waters & Associates, Bromley, Kent, England, 1993.
