= Rosario Oeste railway station =

Railway station in Rosario, Argentina

Coordinates: 32°56′31.92″S 60°41′34.26″W

Rosario Oeste
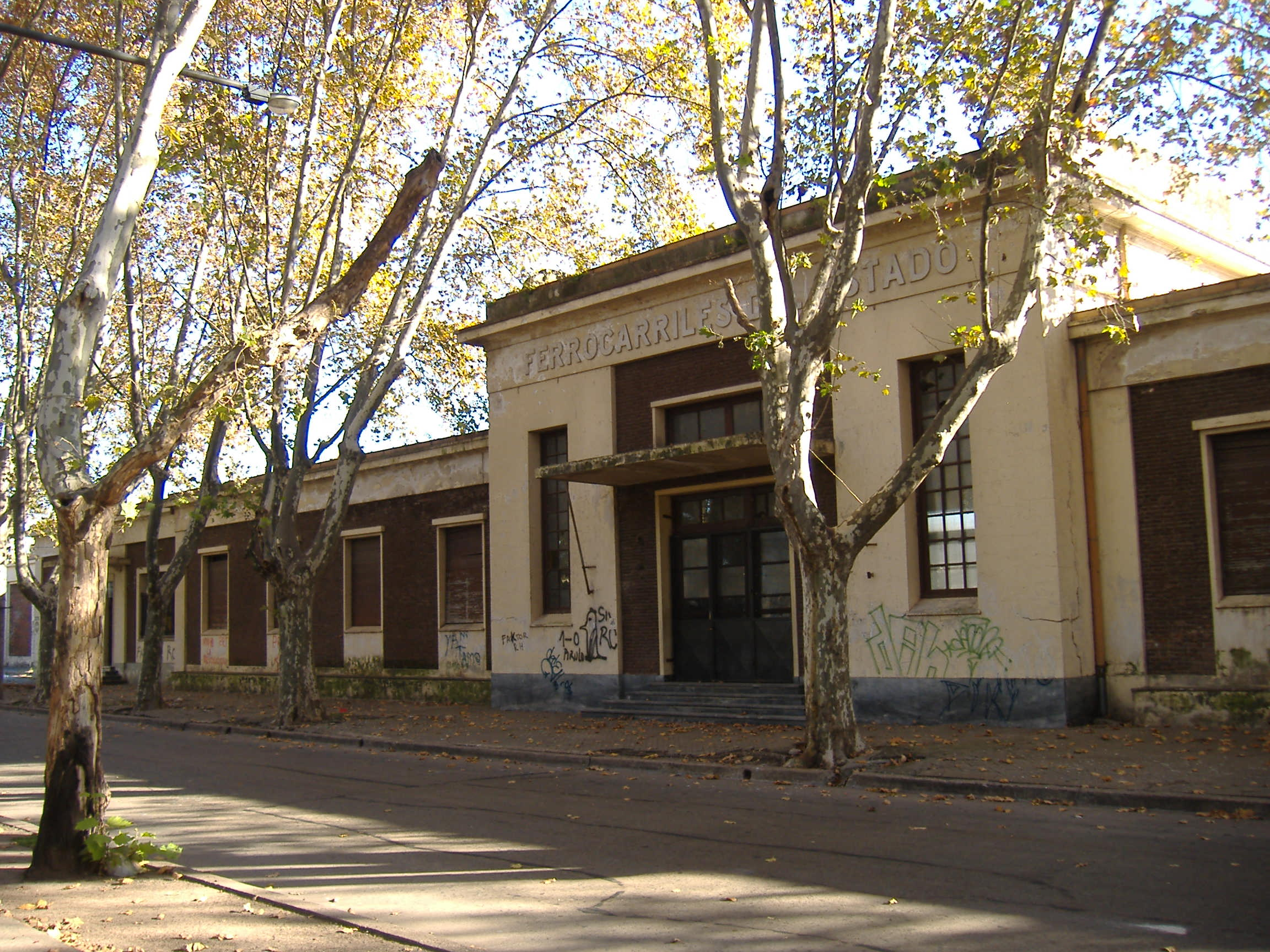
- Main building of the station

General information
- Location: Paraná and 9 de Julio, Rosario, Argentina
- System: Inter-city
- Owner: Government of Argentina
- Operator: Córdoba Central Railway (1917–1948); Ferrocarriles Argentinos (1948–1993)
- Line: Belgrano Railway

History
- Opened: 1917
- Closed: 1993; 33 years ago
Location

Rosario Oeste is a former railway station in Rosario, province of Santa Fe, Argentina. The station, part of the Belgrano Railway network, is located in the west of the city, on the junction of Paraná St. and 9 de Julio streets.

State-owned company Trenes Argentinos Cargas runs freight trains to the north of Argentina on the line, with no operations in Rosario Oeste.

== History ==
The site of the station was originally only a stop for the line that led west to Córdoba, operated by the Córdoba Central Railway company. It was established in 1917 under the name Kilómetro 302 (i.e. 302 km measured from Buenos Aires). In 1939 the State Railway Administration renamed it to "Rosario Oeste".

During the mid-1940s the existing building (a wooden construction) was demolished and the new station was built, in a modern rationalist style (unlike other, older stations which followed British or French models). Rosario Oeste was designated as the local stop of all meter gauge long-distance trains that arrived in Rosario, avoiding the complicated process of entering and backing up at Rosario Central Córdoba Station.

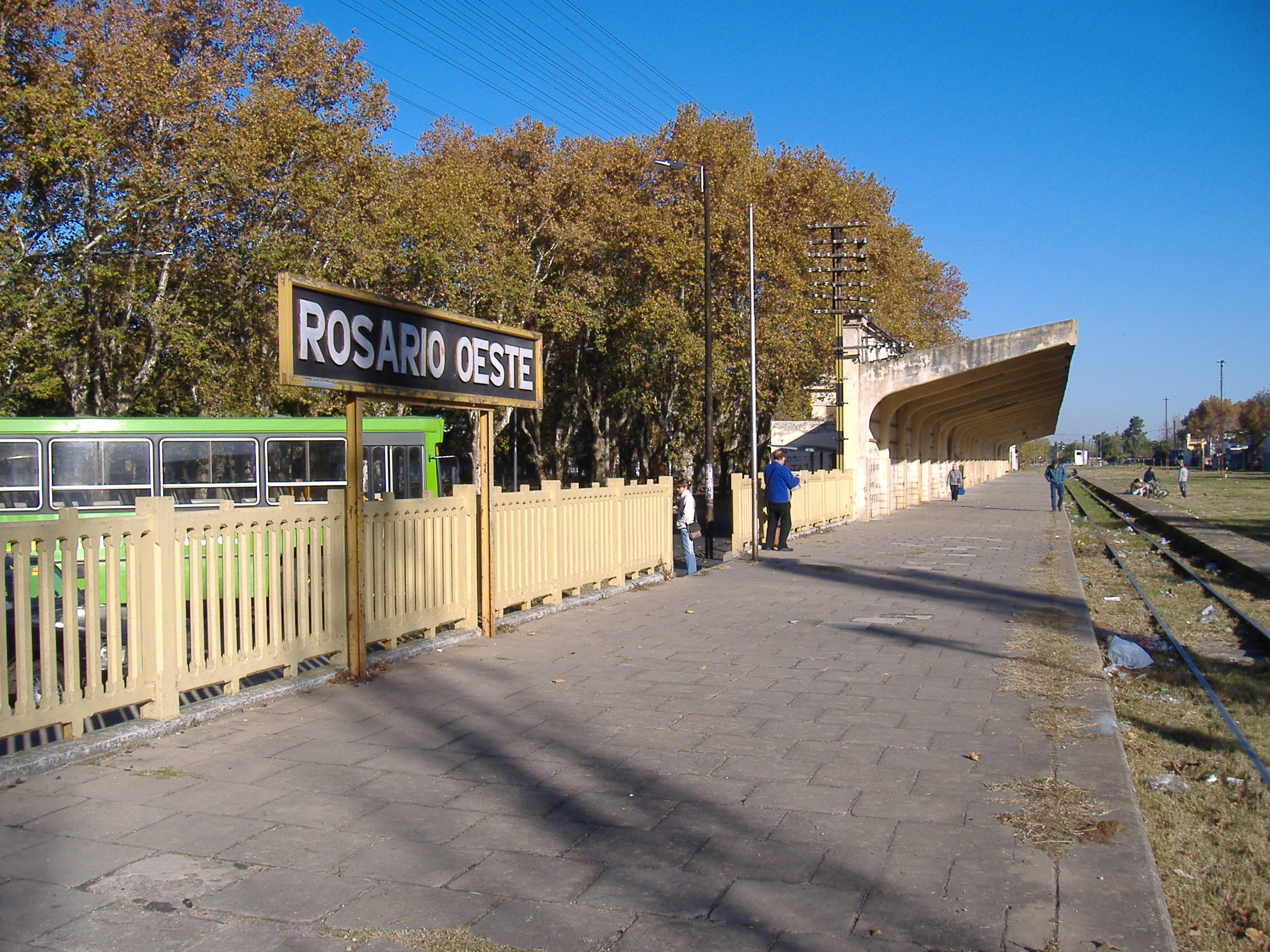
Platform and sign

In 1949 the government of Juan Perón nationalized the railways and attempted to optimize them. The Central Córdoba Railway, which had been taken over by the Argentine government in 1939, was now merged with other companies into the General Manuel Belgrano Railway, which concentrated all of the passenger services at Rosario Oeste, closing down other termini.

In September 1969 the popular uprising known as the Rosariazo caused grave damages to the transport infrastructure of the city. Rosario Oeste Station was looted and set on fire; it was the only station to be rebuilt later.

As the Argentine railway system declined (most of the remaining passenger services being cancelled in 1977, and the cargo services privatized and downsized in the 1990s), the station, like most others, fell into abandon.

Rosario Oeste was intended from the beginning to be a convenient stop for long-distance trains, located in the periphery so that trains would not have to enter the central part of the city. As such, it is usually considered again for this role every time that a possible revamping of the railway system is discussed. In 2006, the municipality announced the site of Rosario Oeste was a likely alternative to build the terminus of the projected Buenos Aires-Rosario-Córdoba high-speed railway, as it was "accessible and presented low urbanistic impact". The official Urban Plan for the period 2007–2017, however, shifted the site to the railway maneuver area known as Patio Parada, closer to the city center (west of Rosario Norte Station).

=== Operators ===
Company	Period
(United Kingdom) Córdoba Central Railway	1917–1948
(Argentina) Ferrocarriles Argentinos	1948–1993

== Bibliography ==
- British Railways in Argentina 1860-1948 by H.R.Stones, P.E. Waters & Associates, Bromley, Kent, England, 1993
