= NCA =

NCA may refer to:

== Businesses and organisations ==
=== Australia ===
- National Capital Authority, a government authority for development planning of the Capital Territory
- National Crime Authority, defunct investigative agency

=== European Union ===
- National Competent Authorities, referring to the country-level agencies participating in EU policy frameworks such as European Union competition law or European Banking Supervision

=== India ===
- Nuclear Command Authority (India)
- National Cricket Academy

=== Ireland ===
- National Consumer Agency, a defunct government body
- National Cycling Association, a defunct sports governing body

=== Norway ===
- Norwegian Church Aid, a charity
- Norwegian Coastal Administration, a government agency

=== Pakistan ===
- National College of Arts, Lahore
- National Command Authority (Pakistan)

=== United Kingdom ===
- National Campaign for the Arts, a lobbying group
- National Character Area, a type of region in England
- National Crime Agency, a law enforcement agency
- The Northern Care Alliance NHS Group, a health-care organisation for Greater Manchester

=== United States ===
- National Climate Assessment, a governmental interagency
- National Cheerleaders Association, an organization that holds cheer camps and competitions
- National Credentialing Agency for Laboratory Personnel, a professional association for medical laboratory professionals.
- National Coffee Association, a coffee industry body
- National Command Authority (United States), a military doctrine
- National Communication Association, an organization to promote communication studies as a discipline
- National Conservation Area, a class of region managed by the Bureau of Land Management
- North Central Association of Colleges and Schools, one of six organizations that provide higher learning accreditation

=== Elsewhere ===
- National Citizens Alliance, federal political party in Canada
- National Computerization Agency, a Korean statutory agency for informatization
- Network of Concerned Anthropologists, an independent ad hoc network of anthropologists seeking to promote an ethical anthropology
- National Conscription Agency, an agency in Taiwan
- New Classical Adventure, a record label for classical music based in Hamburg, Germany
- Nigerian College of Accountancy, training institution in Jos, Nigeria
- Nippon Cargo Airlines, a cargo airline of Japan
- Nuevo Central Argentino, an Argentine railway company

== Chemistry ==
- Amino acid N-carboxyanhydride
- Lithium nickel cobalt aluminium oxides, a group of lithium-ion battery cathode materials

== Computing ==
- Network Computing Architecture (disambiguation)
- Neighbourhood components analysis, a supervised classification technique
- Nexus Computing Agents, trusted software programs in Microsoft's delayed Next-Generation Secure Computing Base initiative
- Nortel Certified Architect, the highest Nortel certifications
- .nca-File ( Nintendo Switch Content Archive- or Nikon Camera Color Adjustment-File)

== Law ==
- Nature Conservation Act 1992, Queensland, Australia
- Noise Control Act, a U.S. law more formally known as the Noise Pollution and Abatement Act of 1972
- Non-compete agreement, an agreement between an employer and employee prohibiting an employee from working for a competitor after separation

== Places ==
- New Caledonia, French overseas territory, UNDP country code
- Nicaragua, by IOC country code
- Urban community of Nice Côte d'Azur, the intercommunal structure gathering the city of Nice, France and some of its suburbs
- Ngorongoro Conservation Area, a protected area and World Heritage Site Arusha, Tanzania
- North Caicos Airport, Turks and Caicos Islands (by IATA code)

== Other uses ==
- Nationwide Ceasefire Agreement, a landmark ceasefire agreement in Myanmar commonly known by its abbreviation
- NC.A (born 1996), Korean singer
- Necessary Condition Analysis, a data analysis method
