= Córdoba Mitre railway station =

Railway station in Córdoba, Argentina

Coordinates: 31.4203°S 64.1749°W

Córdoba
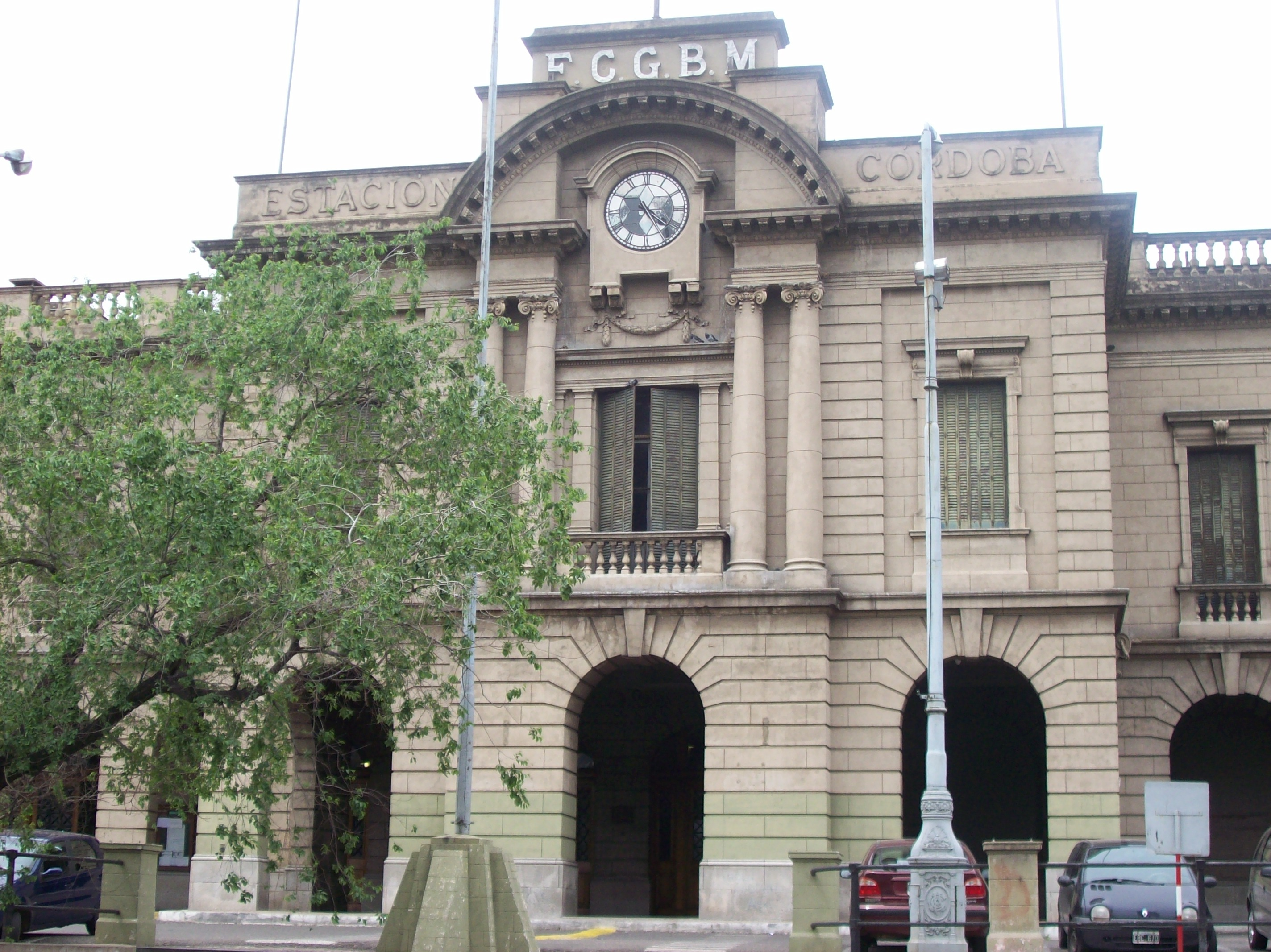
- The station in 2009

General information
- Location: Bv. Juan D. Perón 101, Córdoba; Argentina
- System: Inter-city
- Owner: Government of Argentina
- Operator: Trenes Argentinos (Passenger); NCA (Freight)
- Line: Mitre
- Distance: 700 km (430 mi) from Buenos Aires

History
- Opened: 1886; 140 years ago
Location

Córdoba is a train station in the city of the same name of Córdoba Province, Argentina.

The station was originally built and operated by the Córdoba Central Railway and then added to Ferrocarril Mitre network. It is currently operated by two companies: State-owned Trenes Argentinos (for passenger services) and private Nuevo Central Argentino (NCA) that runs freight trains on the line.

== History ==
In 1863, the government of Argentina granted British-owned company Central Argentine Railway, led by engineer William Wheelwright, a concession to build and exploit a railway line between the cities of Rosario (a major port in southern Santa Fe, on the Paraná River) and Córdoba (a large city near the geographical center of Argentina, and the capital of the province of the same name). The grant included a clause to populate the lands along and around the railway that were given to the company by the national state.

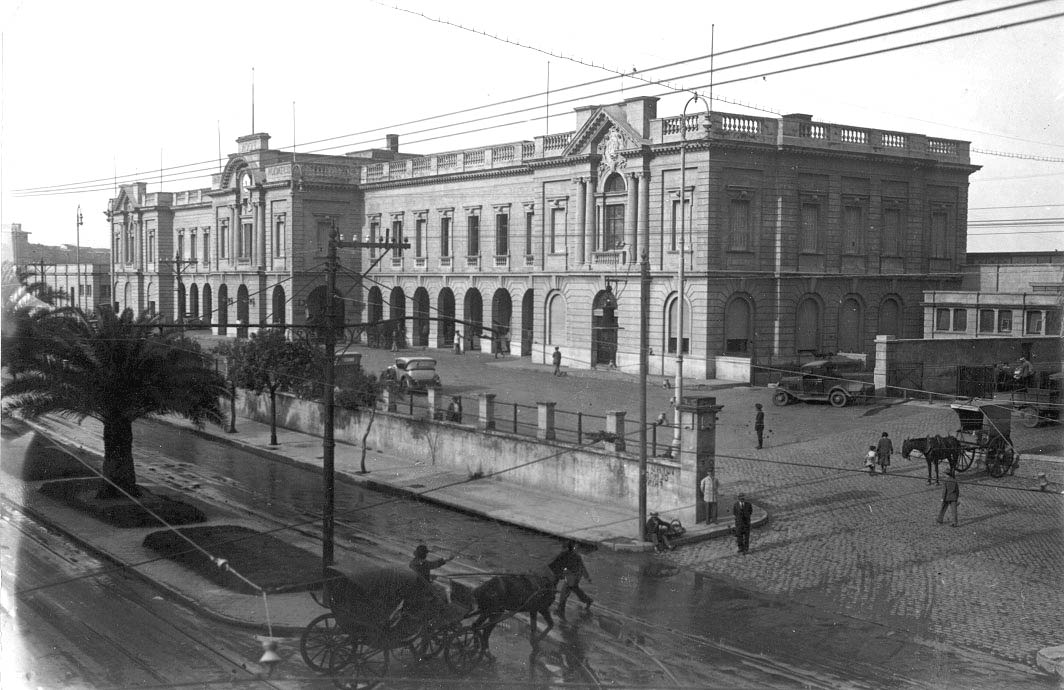
The station in the 1920s

The construction works started in April 1863 with the establishment of the terminus in Rosario, at Rosario Central Station. The line, a 1,676 mm (5 ft 6 in) broad gauge railway, reached Villa María, Córdoba, in September 1867 and the works ceased. Minister Rawson expressed dissatisfaction at the paralysis of the works while passengers also protested against poor conditions of the service. The works for the Rosario Central station and other intermediate stations had not begun. The company alleged that they could not continue the extension of the line until the pending lands were given.

In September 1867 the Government authorized a new disbursement of funds for $1,500,000 to conclude the pending works. Finally in March 1870 the railway reached the city of Córdoba and it was officially inaugurated by then President of Argentina Domingo Sarmiento on April 13. The CAR was the longest railway system at that time and the first to join two provinces.

In 1948, British and French-owned railways in Argentina were nationalised by the Juan Perón's administration. The Central Argentine Railway line was added to Mitre Railway network, being subsequently operated by State-owned company Ferrocarriles Argentinos that ran services to Córdoba station.

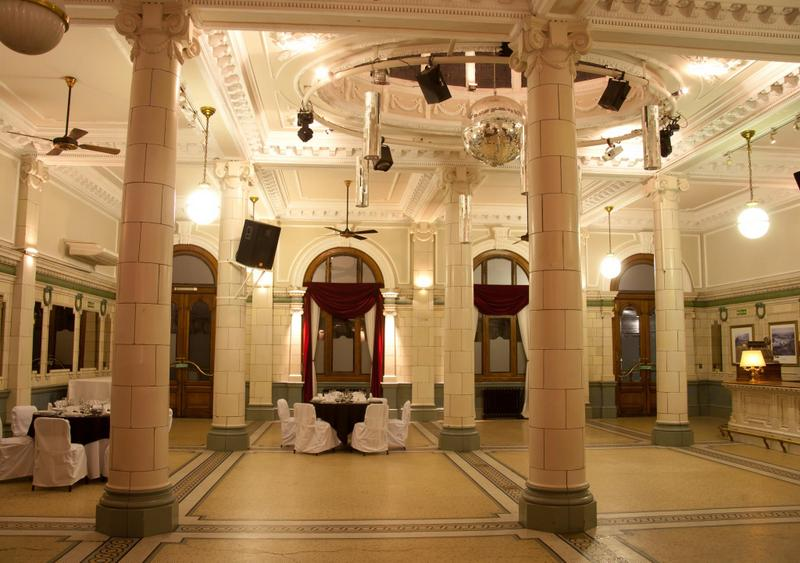
Restaurant hall (2013)

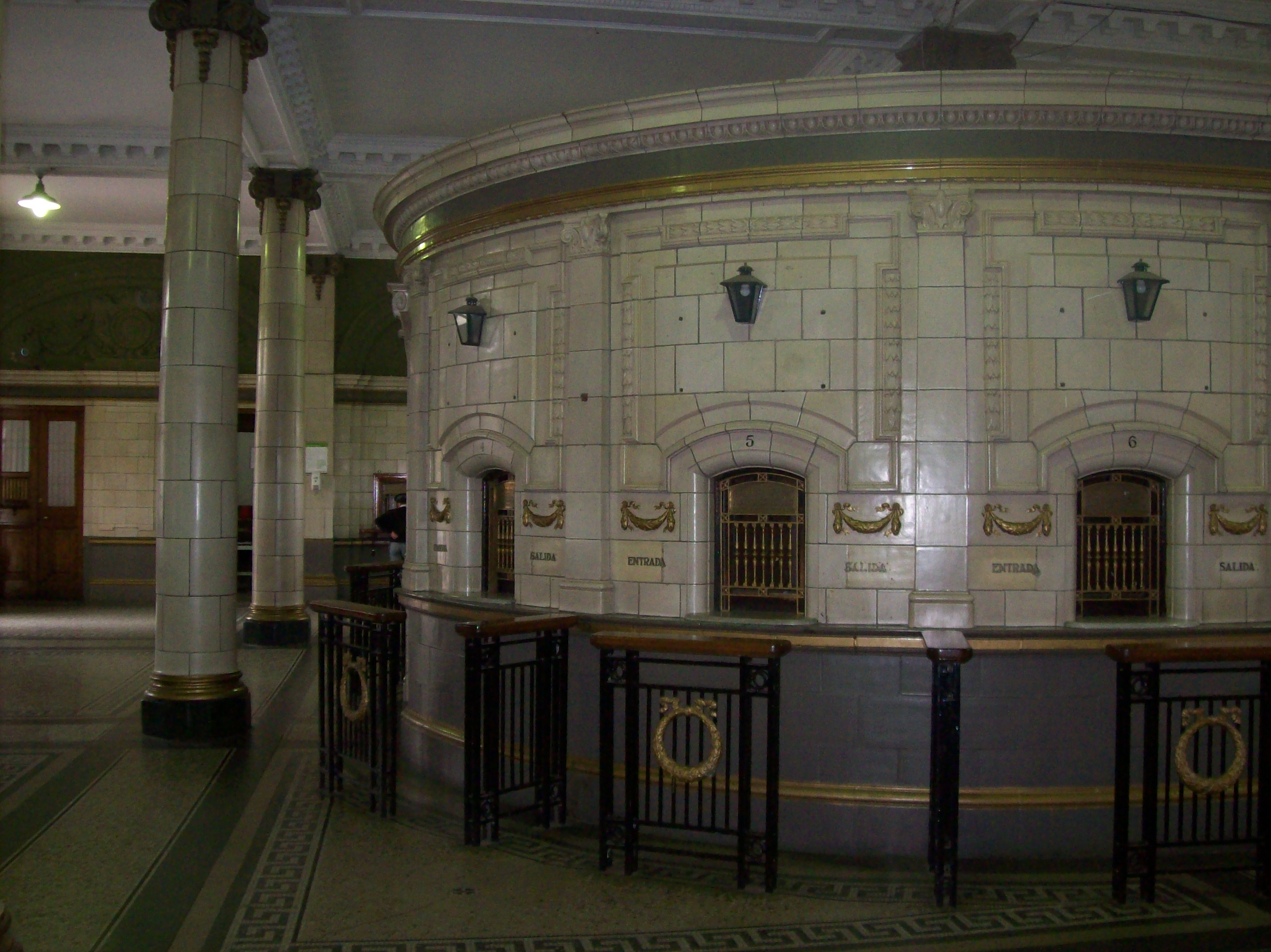
Ticket offices (2009)

When the entire Argentine railway network was privatised in the early 1990s by the Carlos Menem's presidency, passenger services to Córdoba were closed. Nevertheless, the station continued to be operated by private company Nuevo Central Argentino (NCA) that had been granted concession to operate freight services on the line.

The station building (constructed in neoclassical architecture style and in perfect state of preservation) was declared Historic Heritage of Córdoba in 1995.

Passenger trains were reactivated by private company Ferrocentral, that reestablished services from Córdoba to Villa María (in August 2004) and from Retiro (Buenos Aires) to Córdoba in April 2005.

In November 2014, the Government of Argentina (through the State-owned company Trenes Argentinos S.A.) took over the services to Rosario (norte), Tucumán and Córdoba, leaving Ferrocentral inactive.

=== Historic operators ===
Company	Period
(United Kingdom) Central Argentine	1886–1948
(Argentina) Ferrocarriles Argentinos	1948–1993
(Argentina) Nuevo Central Argentino (Note: Only freight services.)	1993–present
(Argentina) Ferrocentral	2004–2014
(Argentina) Trenes Argentinos	2014–present
