= Tucumán Mitre railway station =

Railway station in San Miguel de Tucumán, Argentina

Coordinates: 26.8200°S 65.2103°W

Tucumán
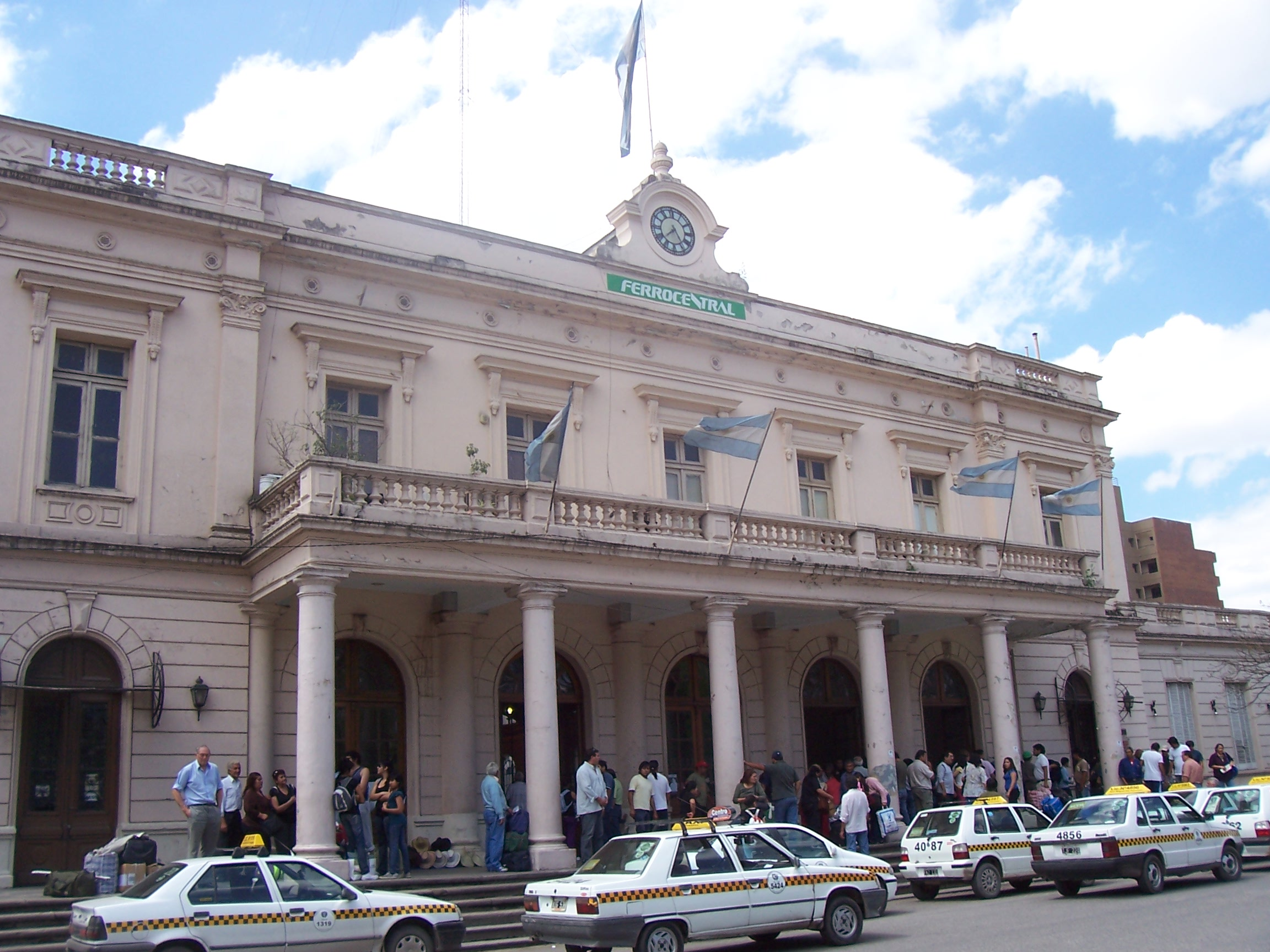
- Facade of the station.

General information
- Location: Corrientes 1045, Tucumán; Argentina
- System: Regional rail
- Owner: Government of Argentina
- Operator: Trenes Argentinos (Passengers); NCA (Freight)
- Line: FC Mitre
- Tracks: 7

Construction
- Platform levels: 6

History
- Opened: 1891; 135 years ago
Location

Tucumán is a train station in the city of San Miguel de Tucumán of Tucumán Province, Argentina, and terminus of Ferrocarril Mitre.

The station was built and firstly operated by the Buenos Aires and Rosario Railway (BA&R) and then added to Ferrocarril Mitre network in 1948. It is currently operated by two companies: State-owned Trenes Argentinos (for passenger services) and private Nuevo Central Argentino (NCA) that runs freight trains on the line.

== History ==
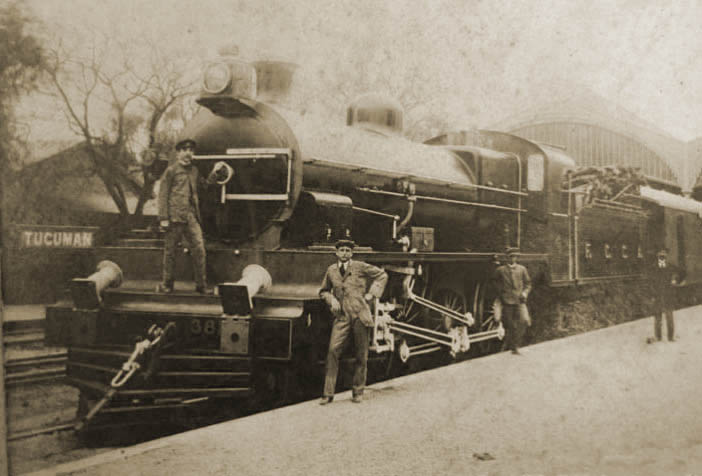
Train and workers in the station, 1910

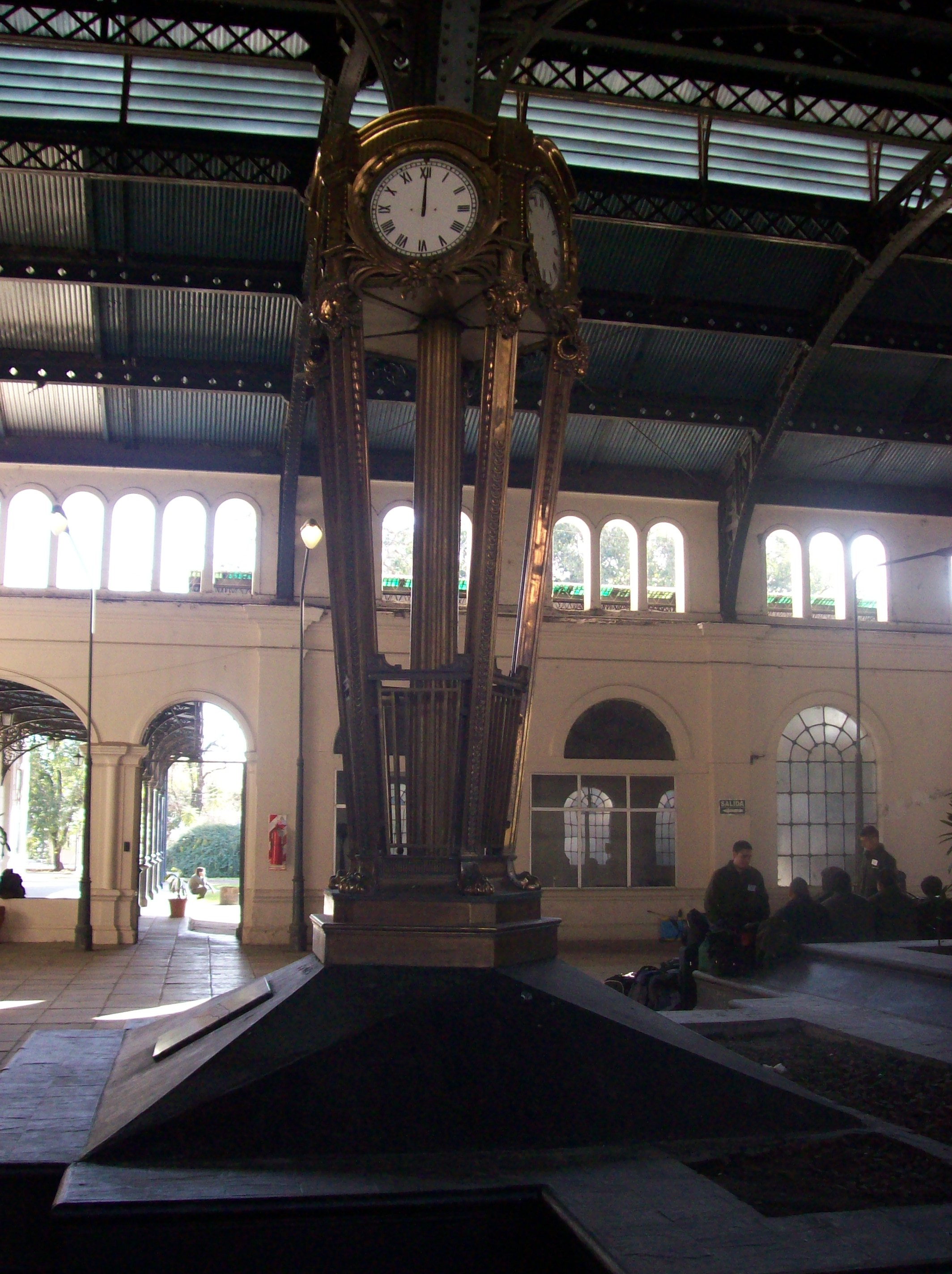
Station hall and clock

The station was inaugurated in February 1891, after the Buenos Aires and Rosario Railway extended its lines to the city of Tucumán. The company had originally conceived a network to the city of Campana, Buenos Aires although it the Government of Argentina granted BAR permission to extend lines to the North of Argentina, reaching Zárate and Rosario in 1885.

In 1896 a weekly express train (with no intermediate stop) began to run from Buenos Aires to Tucumán, with a journey time of 26 hours. In Tucumán station passengers transferred Ferrocarril Central Norte trains that allowed them to reach Northern provinces of Salta and Jujuy.

Tucumán station became part of the Central Argentine Railway network when both companies, BA&R and CA merged in 1908. The CAR also ran several express services to the North of Argentina, being the Estrella del Norte (inaugurated in 1914) the most famous train that joined Buenos Aires and Tucumán. In 1929 it was powered by PS11 W G Armstrong Whitworth & Co locomotives.

In 1948, British and French-owned railways in Argentina were nationalised by the Juan Perón administration. The Central Argentine Railway line was added to Ferrocarril Mitre network, being subsequently operated by State-owned company Ferrocarriles Argentinos that ran services to Tucumán.

After the privatisation of all railway services in Argentina under Carlos Menem's administration, the Tucumán station was operated by two companies, private Nuevo Central Argentino (which was granted the Mitre Railway freight services in concession) and Tucumán Ferrocarriles that ran 4 trains per week to Tucumán. After TUFESA was dissolved, trains to Buenos Aires would be run by NOA Ferrocarriles S.A., with a service named El Jardín de la República ("Garden of the Republic"), taking about 24 hours to connect both cities.

Another private company, Ferrocentral, would take over services to Tucumán after the government of Tucumán revoked the concession granted to NOA in 2005.

In November 2014, the Government of Argentina (through the State-owned company Trenes Argentinos S.A.) took over the services to Rosario, Santa Fe, San Miguel de Tucumán and Córdoba, leaving Ferrocentral inactive.

=== Operators ===
| Company | Period |
|---|---|
| (United Kingdom) Buenos Aires and Rosario Railway | 1891–1908 |
| (United Kingdom) Central Argentine Railway | 1908–1948 |
| (Argentina) Ferrocarriles Argentinos | 1948–1993 |
| (Argentina) Nuevo Central Argentino (Note: Freight services only.) | 1993–present |
| (Argentina) Tucumán Ferrocarriles | 1997–2000 |
| (Argentina) NOA Ferrocarriles S.A. (Note: "Noroeste Argentino Ferrocarriles", public company.) | 2000–2005 |
| (Argentina) Ferrocentral | 2005–2014 |
| (Argentina) Trenes Argentinos Operaciones | 2014–present |
