= Tucumán Ferrocarriles =

Tucumán Ferrocarriles S.A. (TUFESA)
- Type: S.A.
- Industry: Rail transport
- Predecessor: Ferrocarriles Argentinos
- Founded: 1997 in Tucumán
- Defunct: 2000; 26 years ago
- Successor: NOA Ferrocarriles S.A.
- Headquarters: Retiro, Buenos Aires, Argentina
- Area served: Buenos Aires, Santa Fe, Sgo. del Estero, Tucumán
- Services: Public transport
- Owner: Private

Tucumán Ferrocarriles S.A. (also known for its acronym TUFESA) was a company in Argentina which operated a 1,676 mm (5 ft 6 in) railway line between Buenos Aires and Tucumán in Argentina, currently part of Mitre Railway network after nationalisation of the entire railway network in 1948.

== History ==
As part of a national railway privatisation plan, carried out under the presidency of Carlos Menem, a concession to operate the line was granted to the government of Tucumán Province in 1992, that ran a service named El Tucumano, although it did not last so long.

After El Tucumano was definitely cancelled, in 1997 the provincial government called a tender to operate trains to Tucumán. "Tucumán Ferrocarriles S.A." (abbreviated "TUFESA") was granted a concession to run the service. David Giménez was the chairman on board. The company started operating in 1997 with an express service with stopped only in intermediate stations La Banda, Colonia Dorá, and Rosario Norte. Some of the diesel locomotives used were EMD GT-22 and Alco RSD-16. Gimenez left the company some time later, and left a woman in charge, who designated Viviana Totongi as general manager. The company was going through some financial problems at the time these two women came to the office. The company launched a standard service with 4 trains per week from/to Tucumán. It was getting recovered, but some politicians made the situation more difficult.

Those politicians, and the financial problems that were being solved resulted in the cancellation of the contract of concession in 2000 therefore passenger services were interrupted. Two years later, trains from Buenos Aires to Tucumán would be run by NOA Ferrocarriles S.A., with a service named El Jardín de la República ("Garden of the Republic"), taking about 24 hours to connect both cities. although the service was working again. Passengers transportation was really bad, interrupted, and almost didn't work at all.

Another private company, Ferrocentral, would take over services to Tucumán after the government of Tucumán revoked the concession granted to NOA in 2005. the services are working properly until now.
