= NCDS =

NCDS may refer to:

- Nabakrushna Choudhury Centre for Development Studies (NCDS), Bhubaneswar, think-tank of the Government of Odisha
- National Child Development Study, a longitudinal study in Great Britain
- Nortel Certifications
