= Ferrocentral =

Defunct Argentine railway company

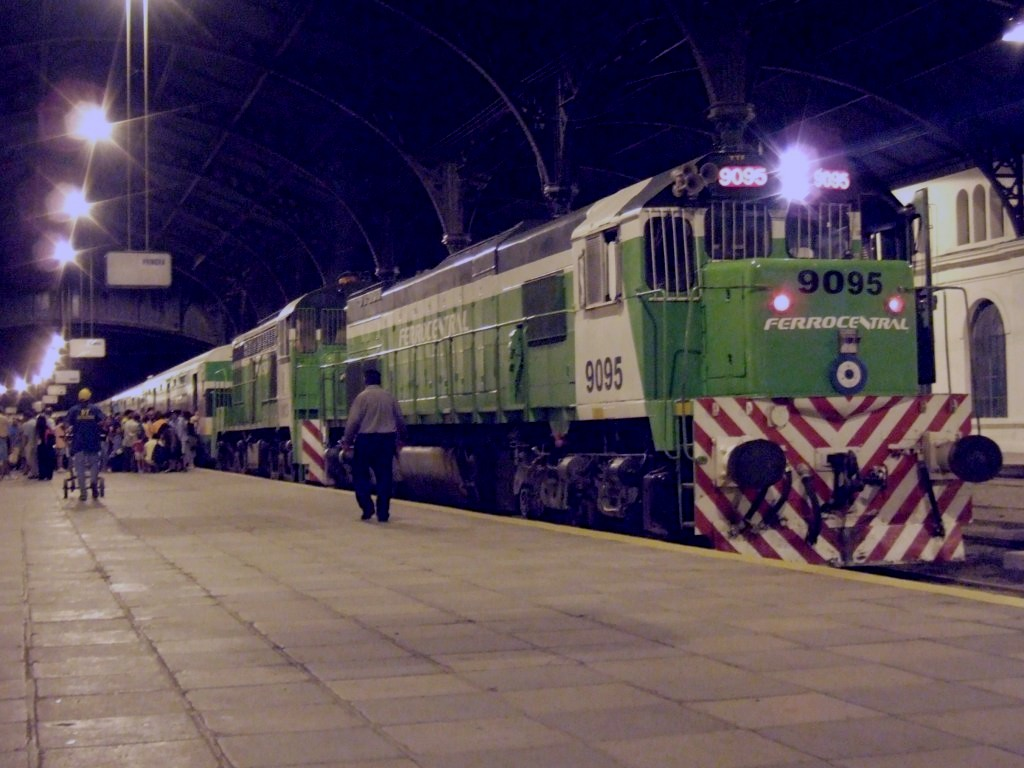
- A train in Tucumán station (2006)
- Type: Private
- Industry: Railway
- Predecessor: Ferrocarriles Argentinos
- Founded: 2004
- Defunct: 2014; 12 years ago
- Fate: Defunct
- Successor: Trenes Argentinos
- Headquarters: Buenos Aires, Argentina
- Area served: Buenos Aires, Córdoba, Santa Fe, Sgo. del Estero, Tucumán Provinces
- Services: Public transport, Maintenance, repair, and operations
- Owner: Grupo Emepa

Ferrocentral was an Argentine private railway company, with a name being a portmanteau of the Spanish words for "Central Rail". It operated long-distance passenger trains from its base at Retiro Mitre station in Buenos Aires to several locations in northern Argentina, running on Ferrocarril Mitre's 5 ft 6 in (1,676 mm) Indian gauge tracks.

The company also ran regional services (such as Tren de las Sierras) on Ferrocarril Belgrano's 1,000 mm (3 ft 3 3/8 in) metre gauge tracks in Córdoba Province. The National Government invested $10 million to re-open the line.

== History ==
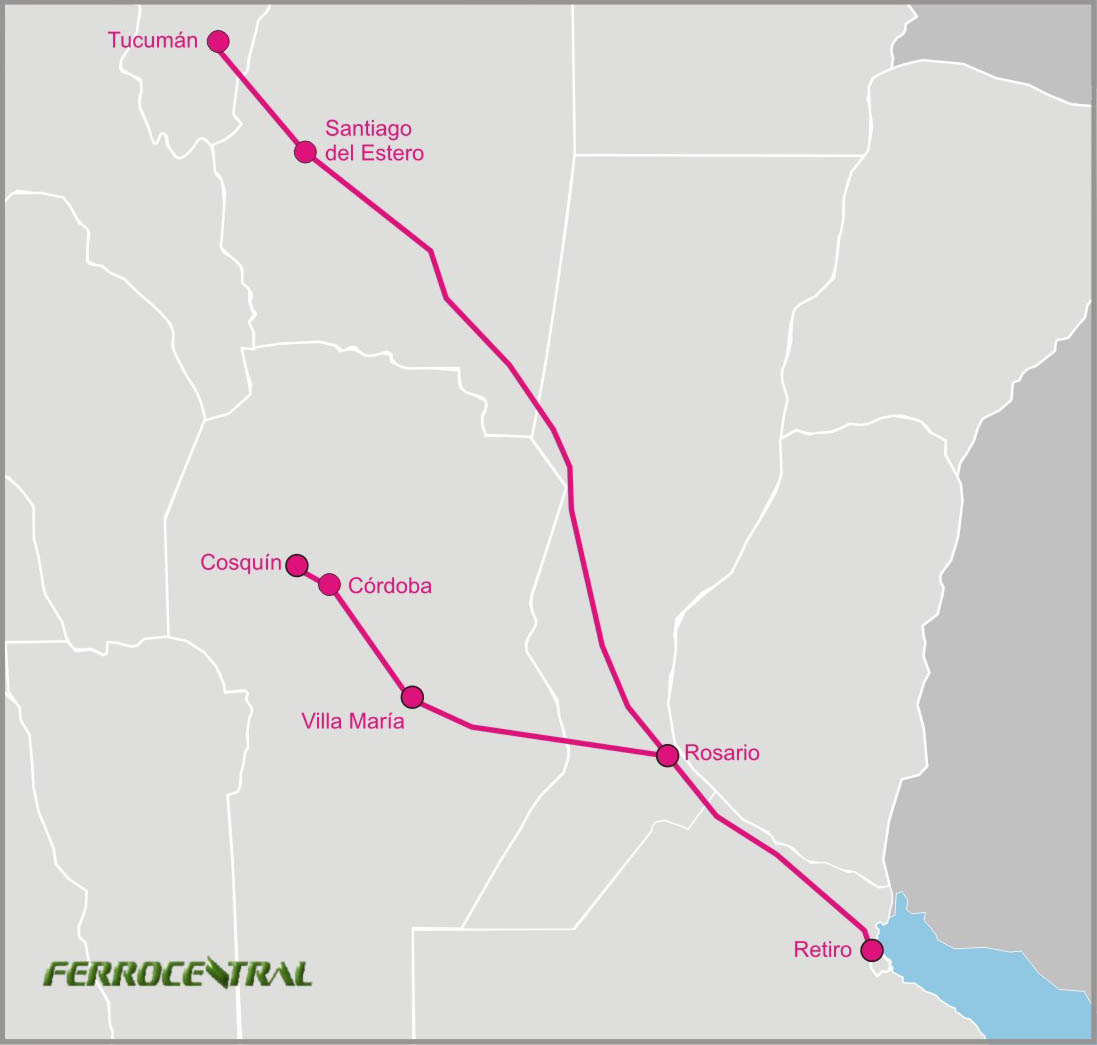
Map with services operated.

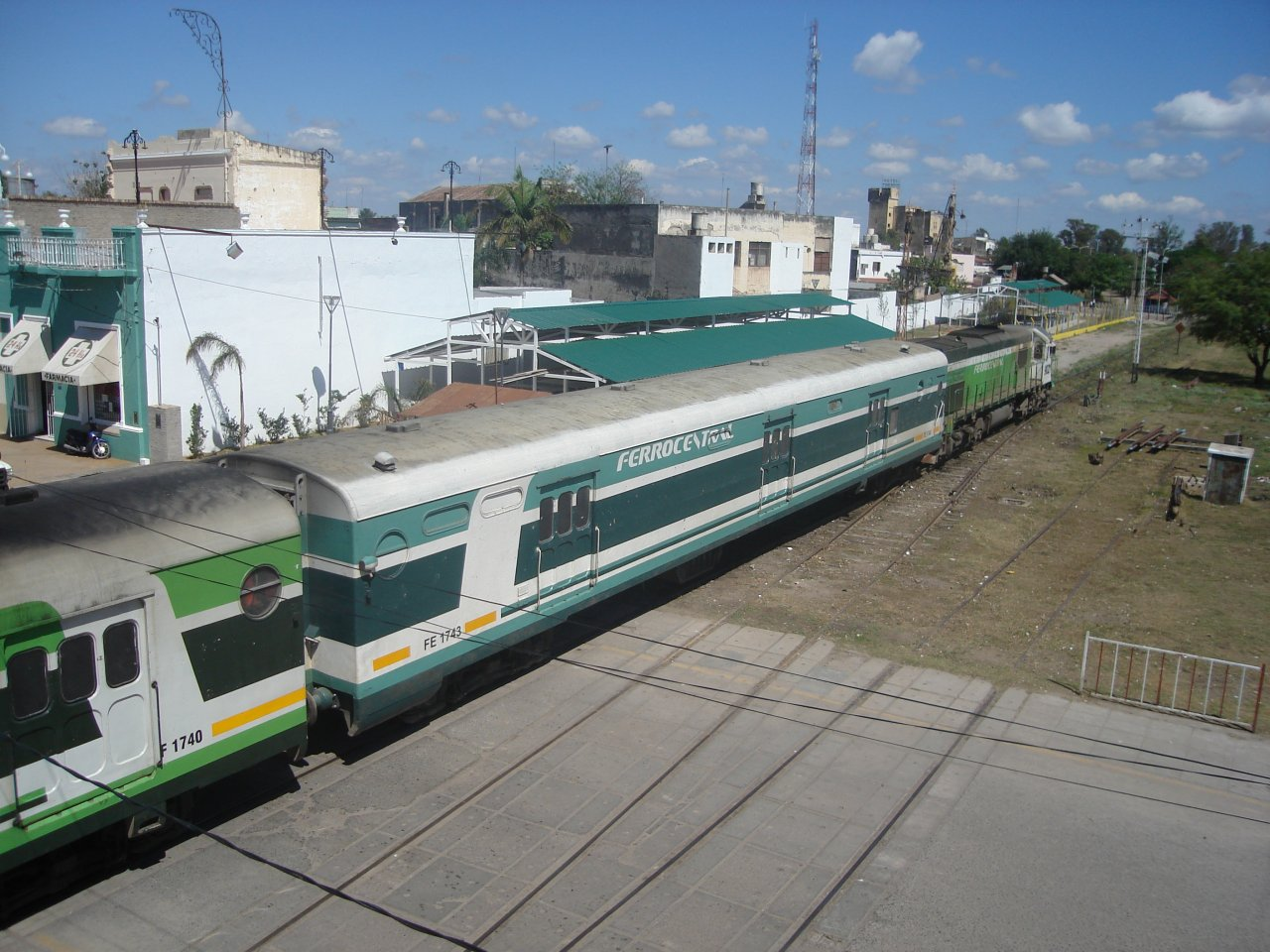
Train in a level crossing in La Banda.

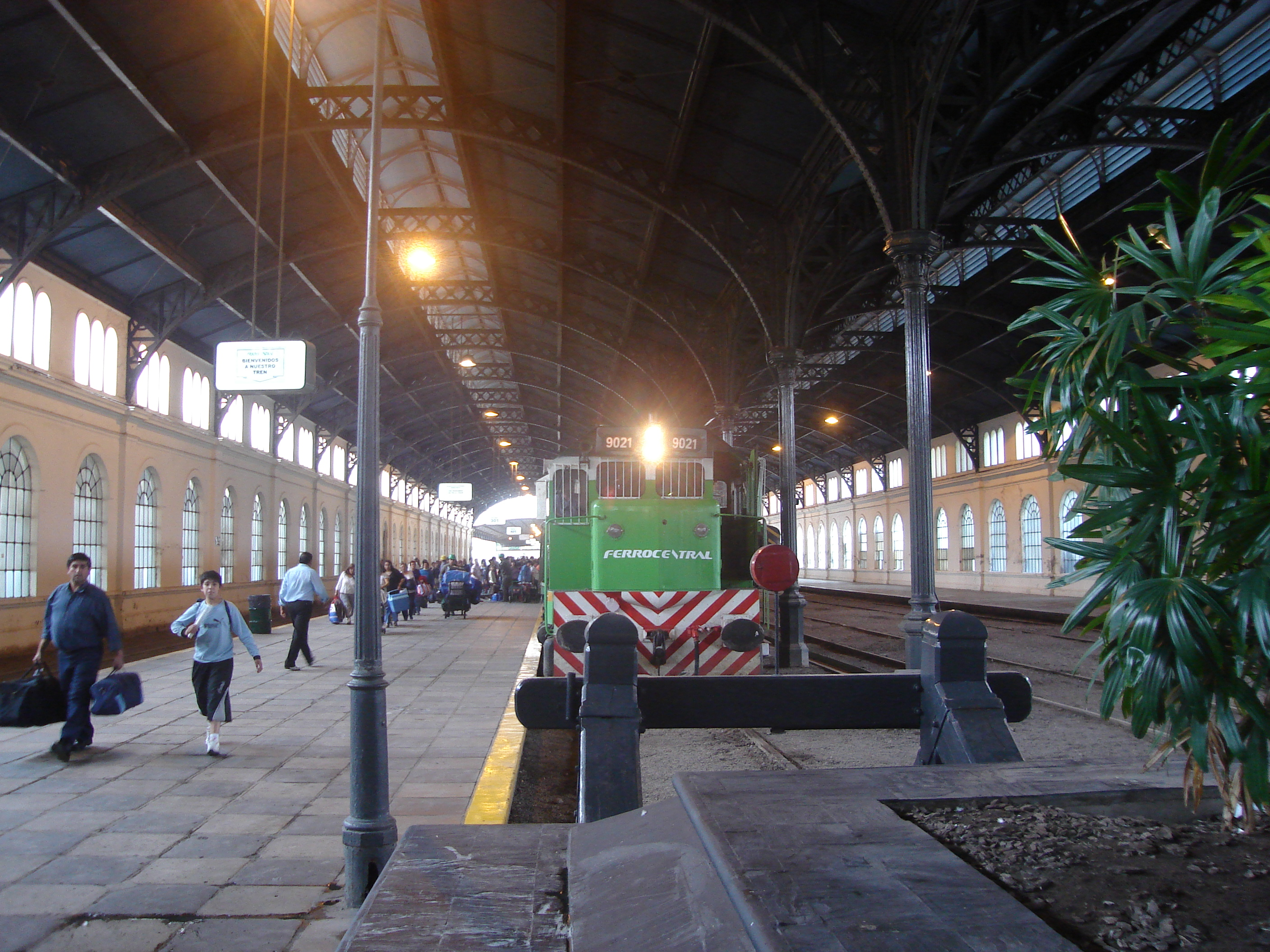
Ferrocentral train at Tucumán station

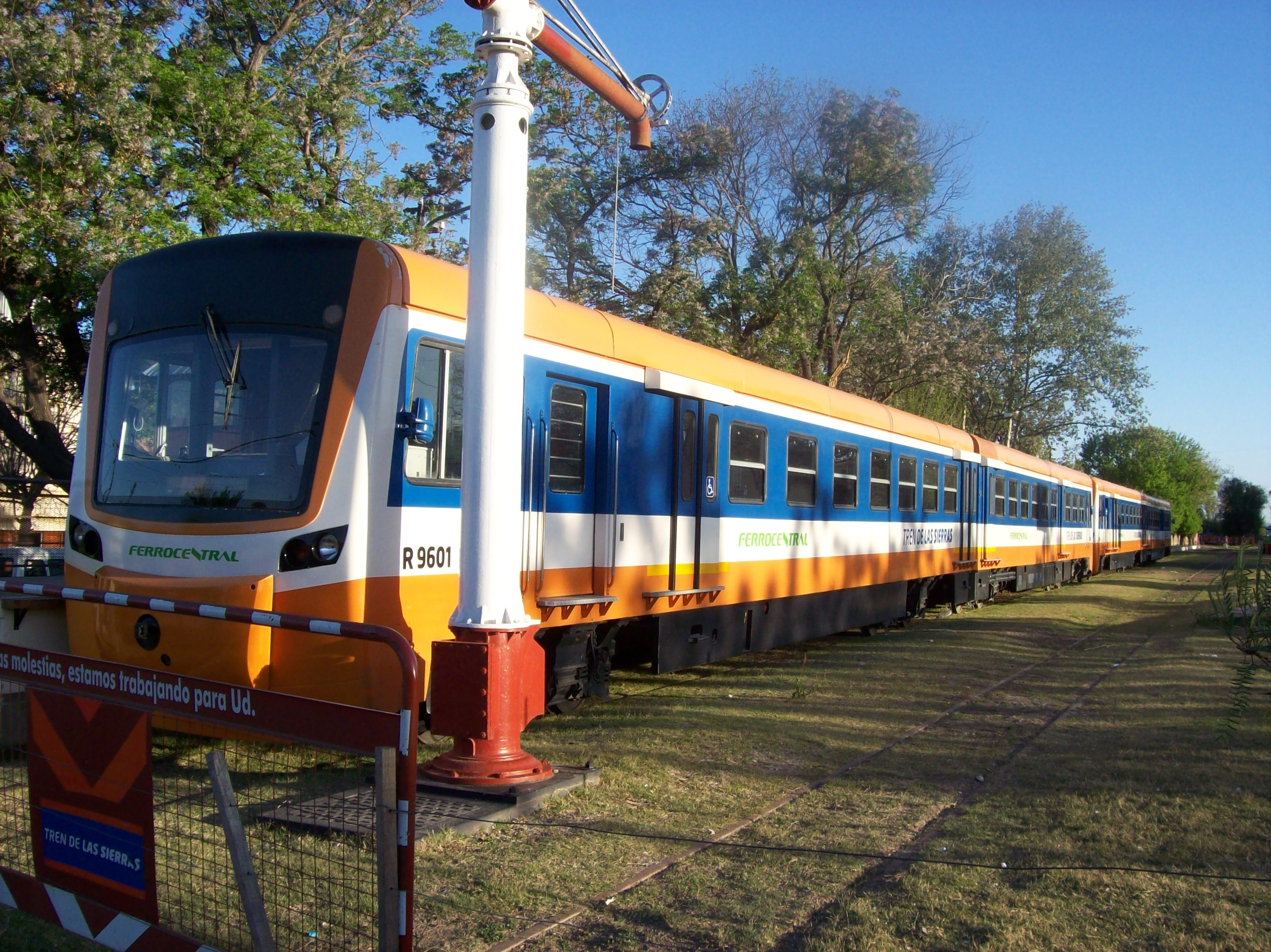
Tren de las Sierras in Cosquín

All of the train routes managed by Ferrocentral had been previously operated by Ferrocarriles Argentinos, the country's now-defunct national passenger railroad corporation. After the privatisation of Ferrocarriles Argentinos starting in 1991, many train services across Argentina were indefinitely discontinued. Since the year 2005, however, Ferrocentral was formed and successfully resurrected some passenger lines.

Ferrocentral was established in 2005, being formed by two railway companies, Nuevo Central Argentino (concessionary of Ferrocarril Mitre's freight services) and Ferrovías (which operates the Belgrano Norte Line) with the purpose of running trains from Retiro station in Buenos Aires to the city of Córdoba.

In 2006 Ferrocentral started to run trains to Tucumán, with stops in Rosario and La Banda, a city of Santiago del Estero Province. Long-distance passenger trains were tractioned by GT22 diesel locomotives. Most services operated in the late night and early morning hours as the rail lines are used for transporting cargo during the daytime.

One year later the company also re-opened the Tren de las Sierras ("Mountain Range Train") of Córdoba Province that connected the cities of Córdoba and Cosquín.

On 2013, Ministry of Transport of Argentina, Florencio Randazzo, signed a resolution transferring the services to Córdoba and San Miguel de Tucumán to State-owned companies SOFSE (also known as "Trenes Argentinos") and Administración de Infraestructuras Ferroviarias (ADIF).

In addition, some problems with ticket sales were reported by users, accusing the company to give a poor service for online purchasing, as well as the virtually nil availability of seats.

In November 2014, the Government of Argentina (through the State-owned company Trenes Argentinos S.A.) took over the services to Rosario, Tucumán and Córdoba, leaving Ferrocentral inactive.

== Services ==
Services operated as of October 2014:

Start	End	Journey time (h)	Days p.w.	Opened
Retiro	Rosario Norte	9	3	2005
Retiro	Córdoba	14	4	2005
Retiro	Tucumán	24	2	2005
Córdoba	Villa María	3	2	2004
Alta Córdoba	Cosquín	2	7	2007
