= Network Computing Architecture =

Network Computing Architecture may refer to:

- Network Computing Architecture, protocol created by Apollo Computer in their Network Computing System
- Network Computing Architecture, three-tier architecture by Oracle Corporation
