= Rosario Norte Station =

Railway station in Rosario, Argentina

Rosario Norte
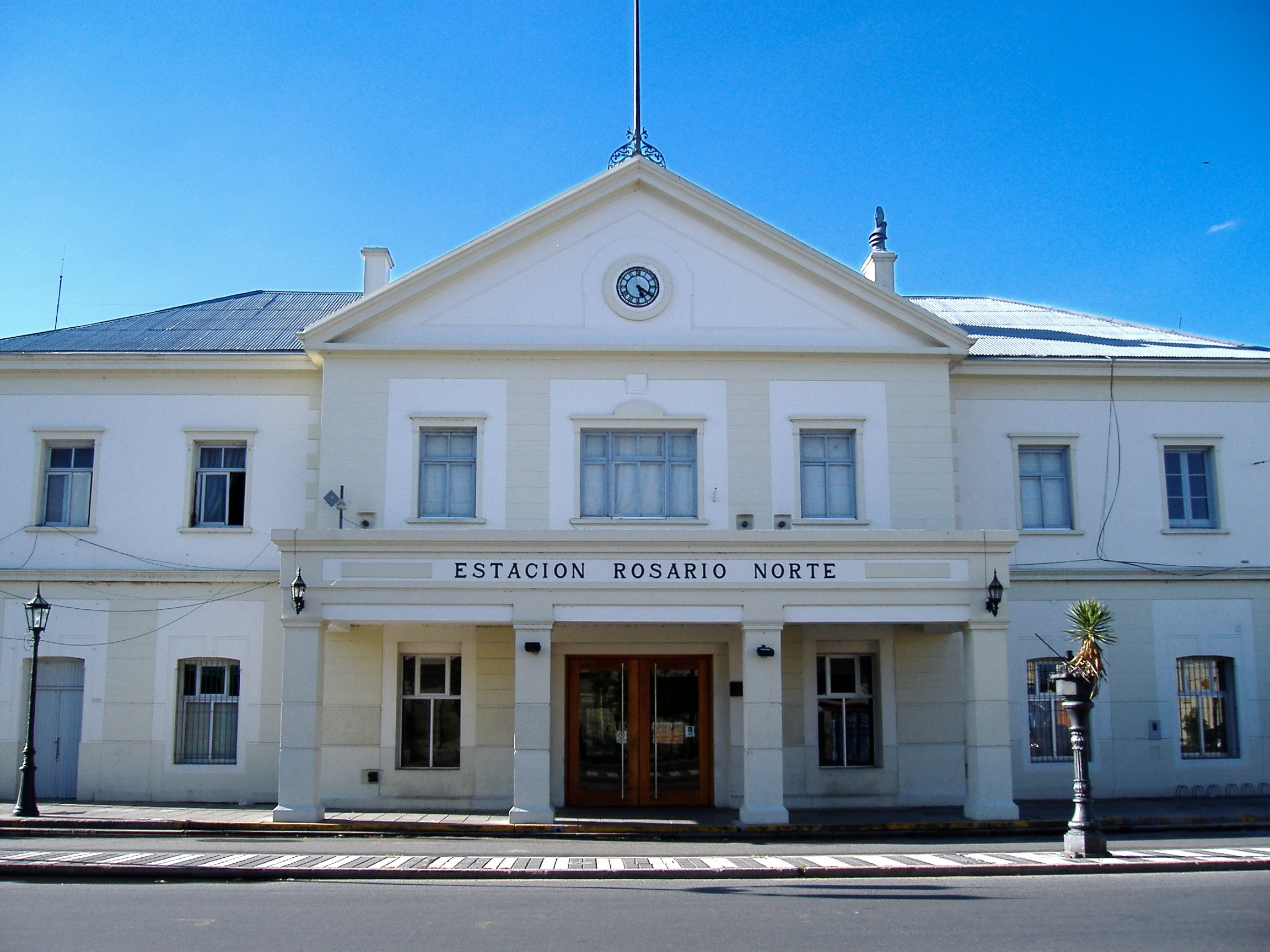
- Façade of the station, on del Valle Avenue (2006).

General information
- Location: A. del Valle and Callao; Rosario; Argentina
- Owner: Government of Argentina
- Operator: Trenes Argentinos (Passengers); NCA (Freight)
- Line: Mitre
- Platforms: 6

History
- Opened: 1885; 141 years ago
Location

Rosario Norte is a railway station in Rosario, province of Santa Fe, Argentina. It is located on Aristóbulo del Valle Avenue, at the junction with Callao St., north of the city centre, in the neighbourhood known as Barrio Pichincha.

The station, part of the Ferrocarril Mitre network, is currently operated by two companies, State-owned Operadora Ferroviaria (passenger services) and private Nuevo Central Argentino (NCA) (freight).

== History ==
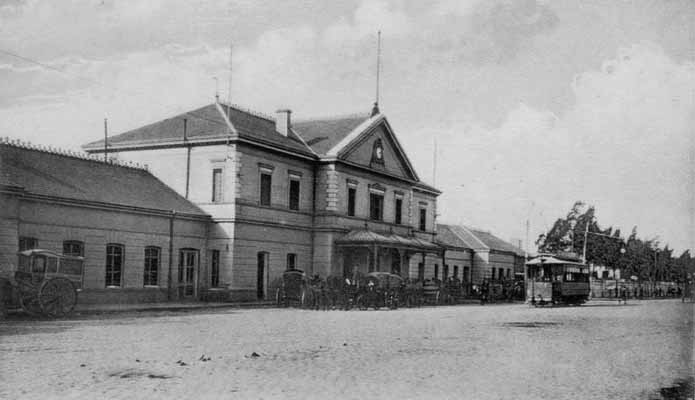
Rosario Norte, c. 1900

The station was terminus of the Buenos Aires and Rosario Railway (BARR) company. The railway line was opened in 1885 and was the first to join Rosario and Buenos Aires (about 300 km south-southeast). From Rosario Norte the line continued to the northwest, crossing several provinces of Argentina to reach Tucumán. In 1908, after the merging of the BARR and the Central Argentine Railway companies, the station was set aside to handle long-distance and express services. Around 1935–1940, a few years after the "golden age" of the Argentine railway system, Rosario Norte served 326,000 passengers per year (more than 800 daily).

In 1977 almost all of the local and mid-distance passenger services were cancelled. Rosario Norte was left in charge of the few remaining ones. Starting in 1991, passenger rail services were eliminated throughout the country, while cargo lines were privatized. The Rosario Norte–Retiro (Buenos Aires) line was shut down in July 1992, and the services going from Rosario Norte to Tucumán suffered the same fate in March 1993.

Rosario Norte was reactivated in October 1997, as the exploitation of a new passenger service between Tucumán and Buenos Aires was granted by the government of Tucumán to the firm Tucumán Ferrocarriles. At the same time, the municipality of Rosario took over most of the building and began to reform it for administrative use. In June 1999 the Municipal Secretariat of Culture and Education was installed there, sharing the facilities with Tucumán Ferrocarriles and with a cargo train company (Buenos Aires al Pacífico/América Latina Logística).

After the turn of the millennium, restoration and maintenance of the station's infrastructure, overdue by about two decades continued, and new services were added. As of 2007, Rosario Norte manages two passenger services from Buenos Aires, a weekly one run by Trenes de Buenos Aires (TBA), and another one (four days a week) run by Ferrocentral. The latter company also has a weekly service to Tucumán and one to Córdoba. These services are considerably slower than going by bus, but also safer and much cheaper.

Since October 2014, State-owned company Operadora Ferroviaria Sociedad del Estado operates the Rosario Norte station as part of the passenger services from Retiro to Tucumán.

In June 2016, Rosario Norte was set as new terminus for the Buenos Aires – Rosario service. Until then, trains only reached Rosario Sur.

== Historic operators ==
Company	Period
(United Kingdom) Buenos Aires and Rosario Railway	1885–1908
(United Kingdom) Central Argentine Railway	1908–1948
(Argentina) Ferrocarriles Argentinos	1948–1993
(Argentina) Tucumán Ferrocarriles	1997–2000
(Argentina) Ferrocentral	2004–2014
(Argentina) Trenes Argentinos Operaciones	2014–present
