= General Bartolomé Mitre Railway =

Argentine railway division

Mitre Railway
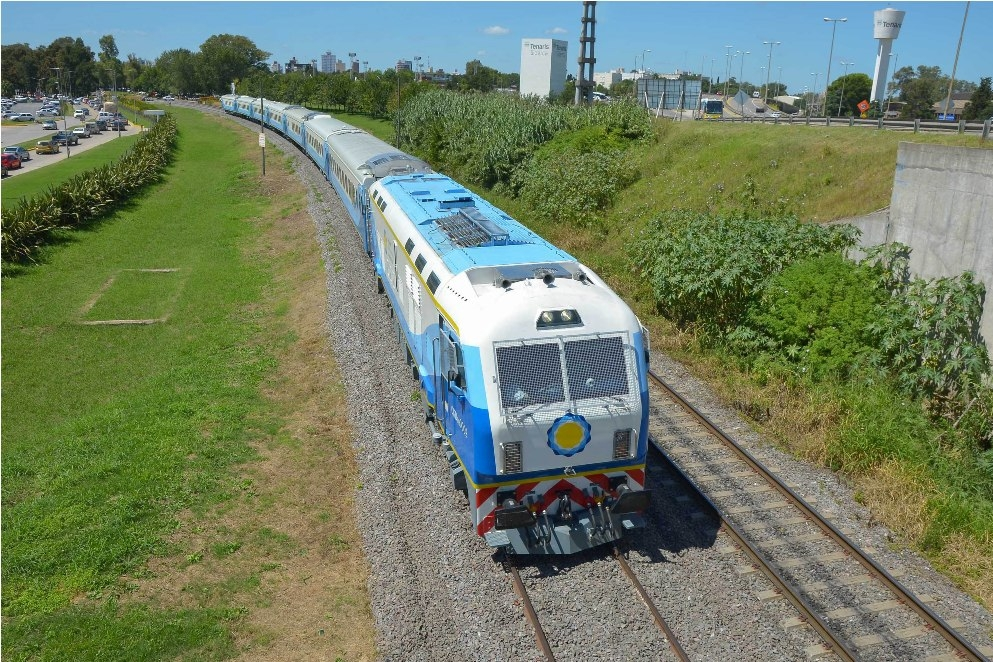
- A CNR CKD8 locomotive used for long distance services to Rosario, Córdoba and Tucumán

Overview
- Native name: Ferrocarril General Bartolomé Mitre
- Status: Active
- Owner: Government of Argentina
- Locale: Buenos Aires, Santa Fe, Córdoba, Santiago del Estero, Tucumán
- Termini: Retiro; Tucumán

Service
- Operator(s): Trenes Argentinos (passenger); NCA (freight)

History
- Opened: 1948; 78 years ago

Technical
- Track gauge: 1,676 mm (5 ft 6 in); 1,435 mm (4 ft 8 1/2 in) standard gauge (Tren de la Costa)
Map of the railway network
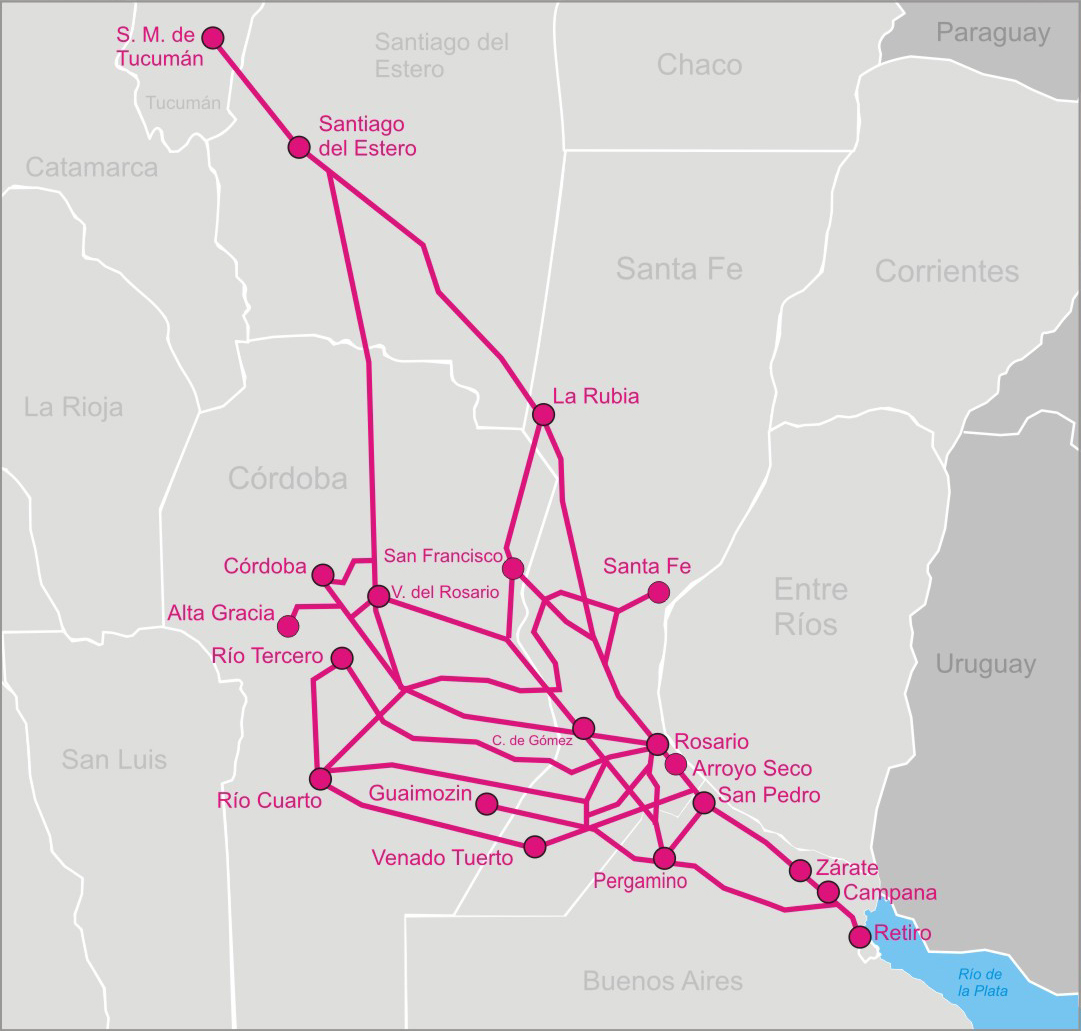

The General Bartolomé Mitre Railway (FCGBM) (native name: Ferrocarril General Bartolomé Mitre), named after the former Argentine president Bartolomé Mitre, is one of the six state-owned Argentine railway lines formed after President Juan Perón's nationalisation of the railway network in 1948 and one of the largest of Argentina. The six divisions, managed by Ferrocarriles Argentinos were later broken up during the process of railway privatisation beginning in 1991 during Carlos Menem's presidency.

The FCGBM incorporated the British-owned 5 ft 6 in (1,676 mm) broad gauge company, Central Argentine Railway, and the northern section of the French-owned broad gauge Rosario and Puerto Belgrano Railway.

The principal lines departed from Retiro railway terminus in Buenos Aires to the north through the provinces of Buenos Aires, Santa Fe, Córdoba, Santiago del Estero and Tucumán.

The Ferrocarril Mitre also has a branch that extends from Villa Gobernador Gálvez in Santa Fe Province to Puerto Belgrano, south of the Buenos Aires Province. This branch was part of the Rosario and Puerto Belgrano Railway although it is no longer in use now.

== History ==
=== Nationalisation ===
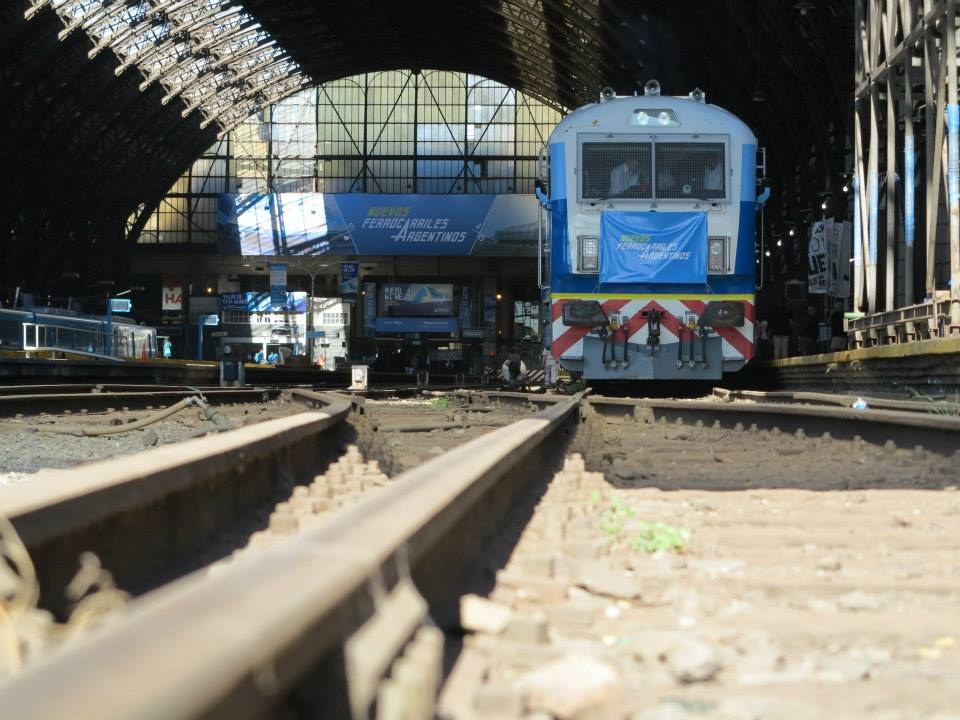
A CNR CKD8 Ferrocarriles Argentinos train bound for Rosario.

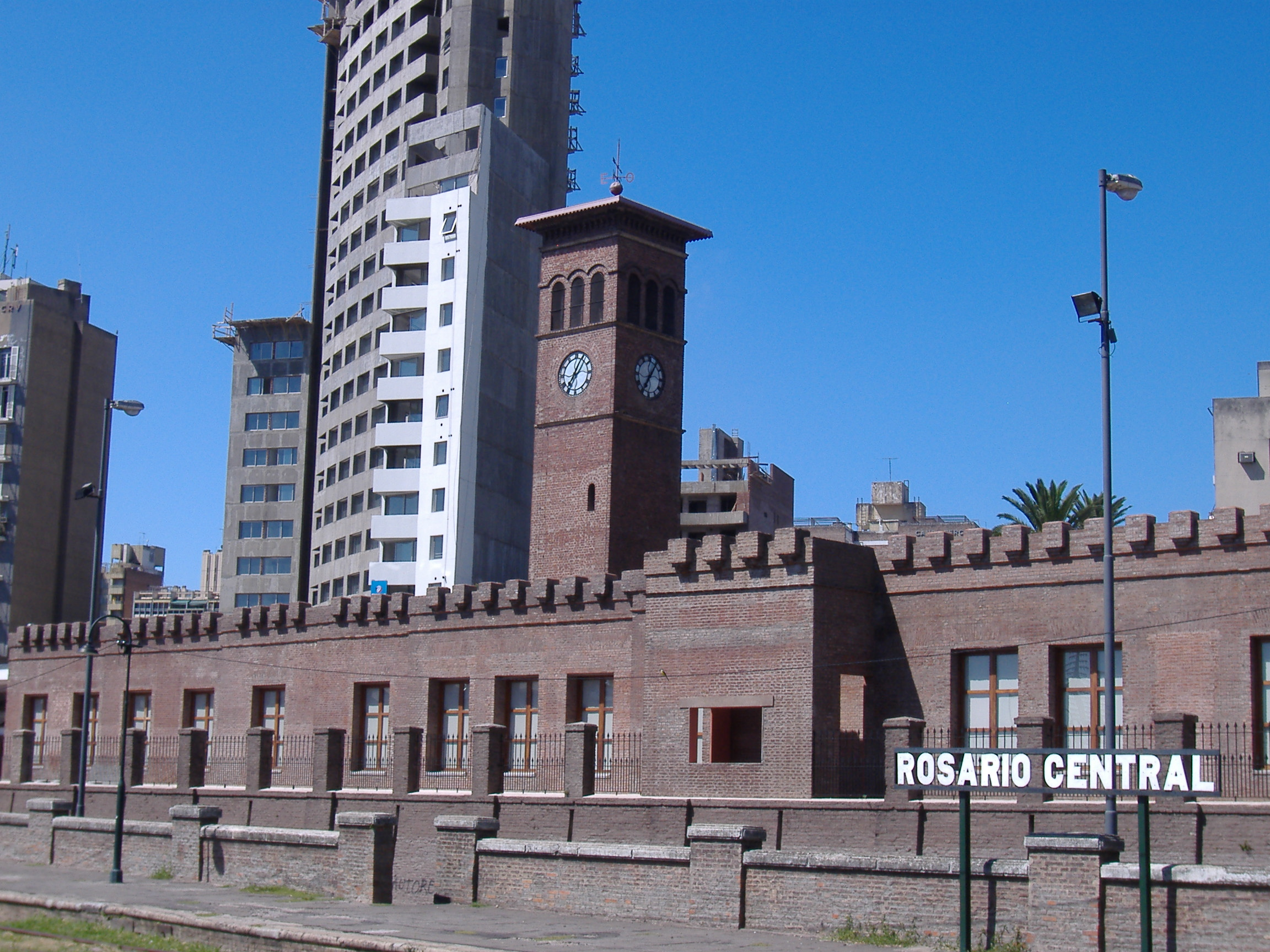
Rosario Central station, closed in 1977.

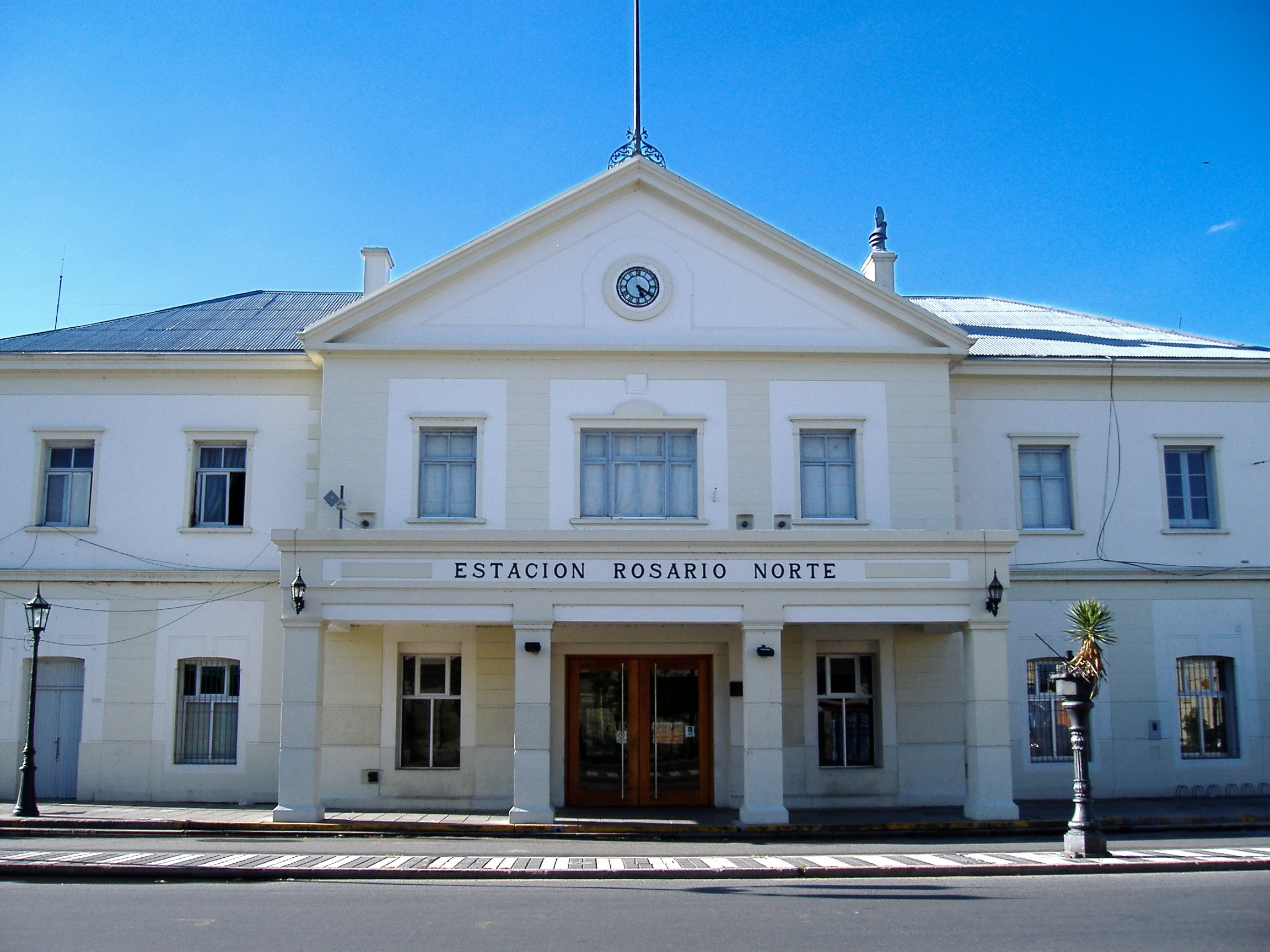
Rosario Norte, originally built by the Buenos Aires and Rosario Railway.

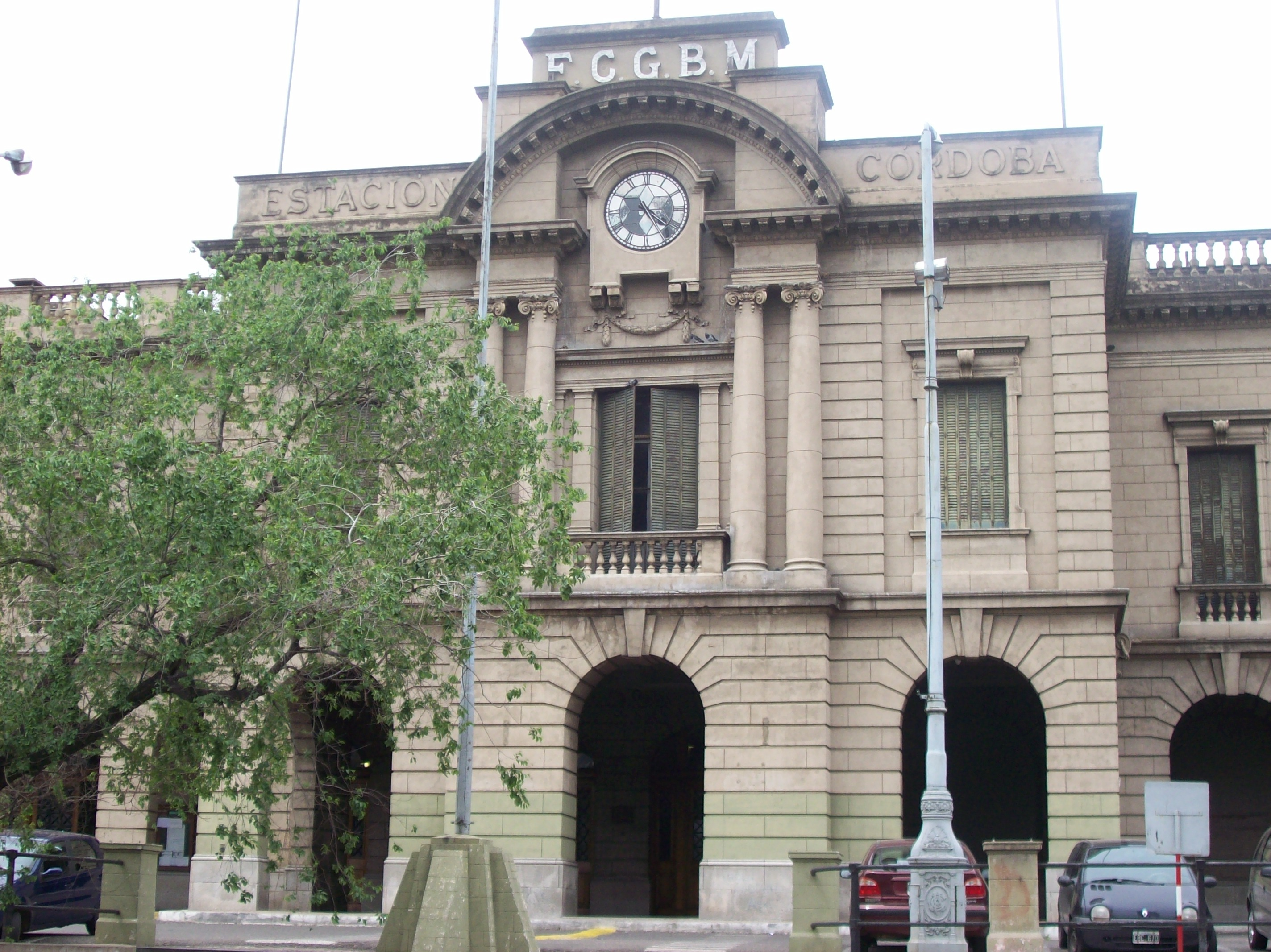
Córdoba station.

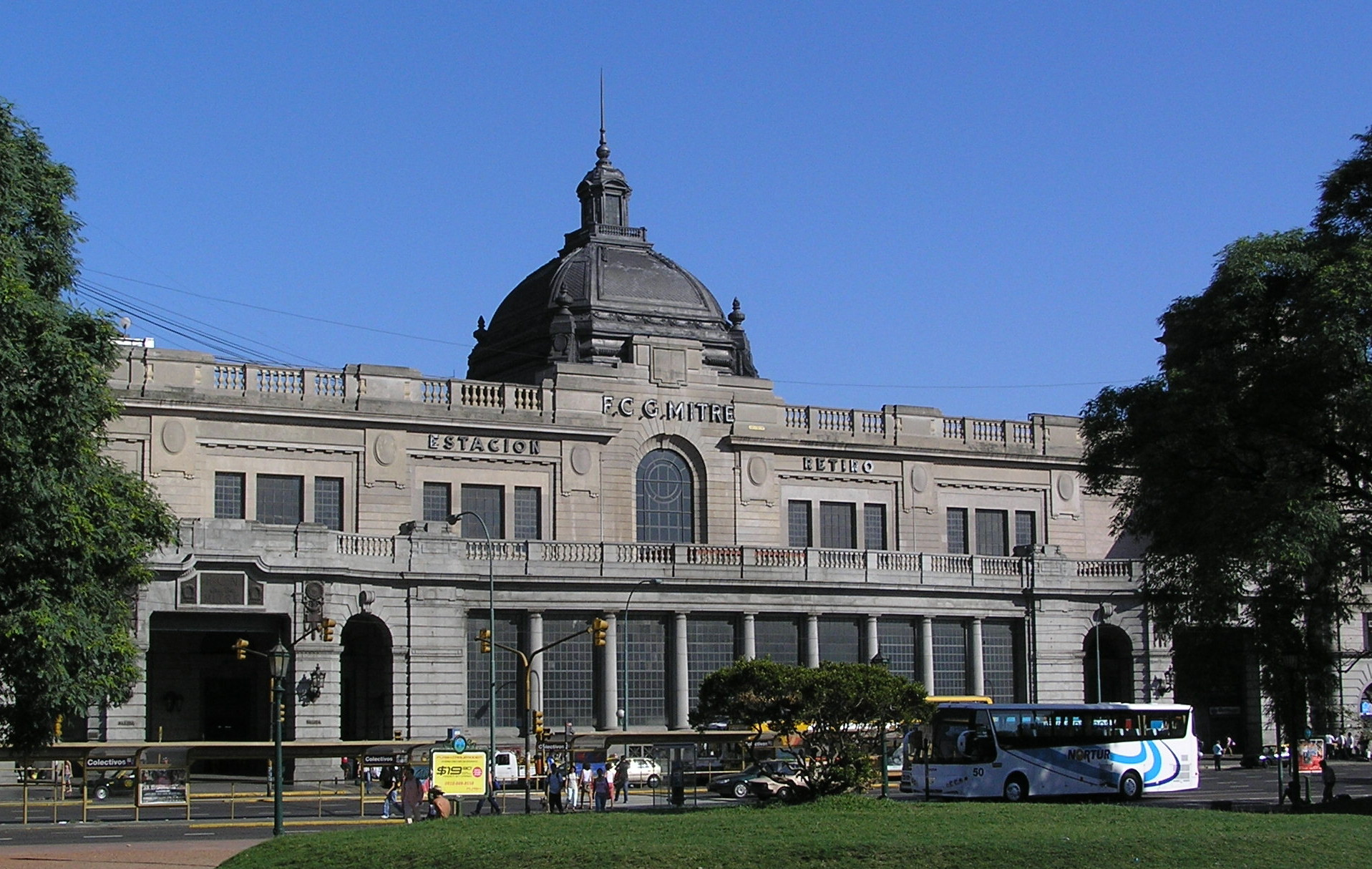
Retiro, terminus of urban and interurban services of the line.

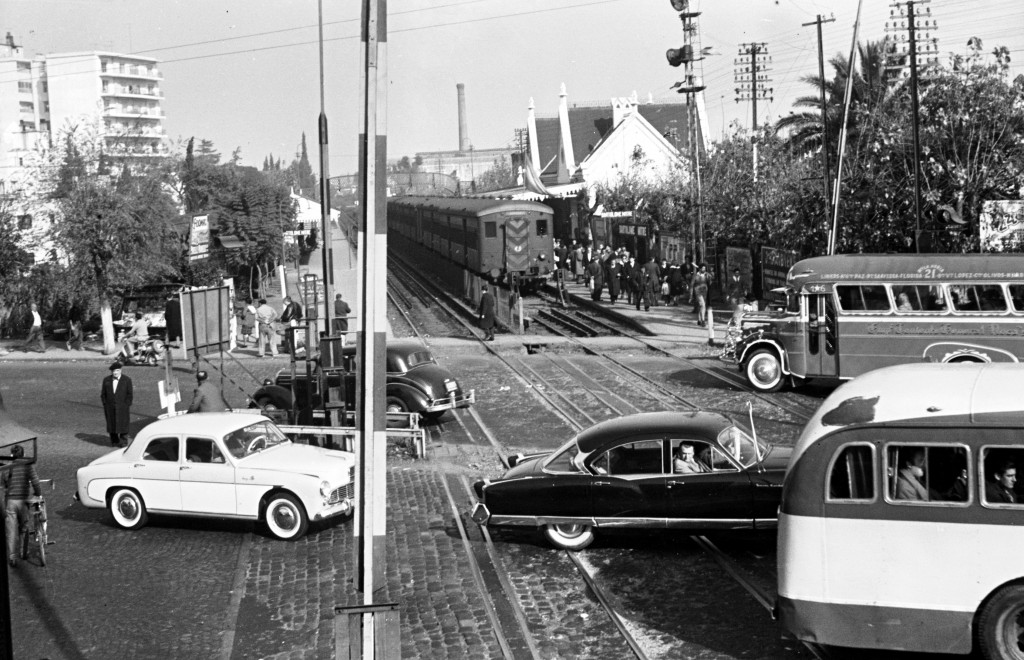
Level crossing in Olivos (1961).

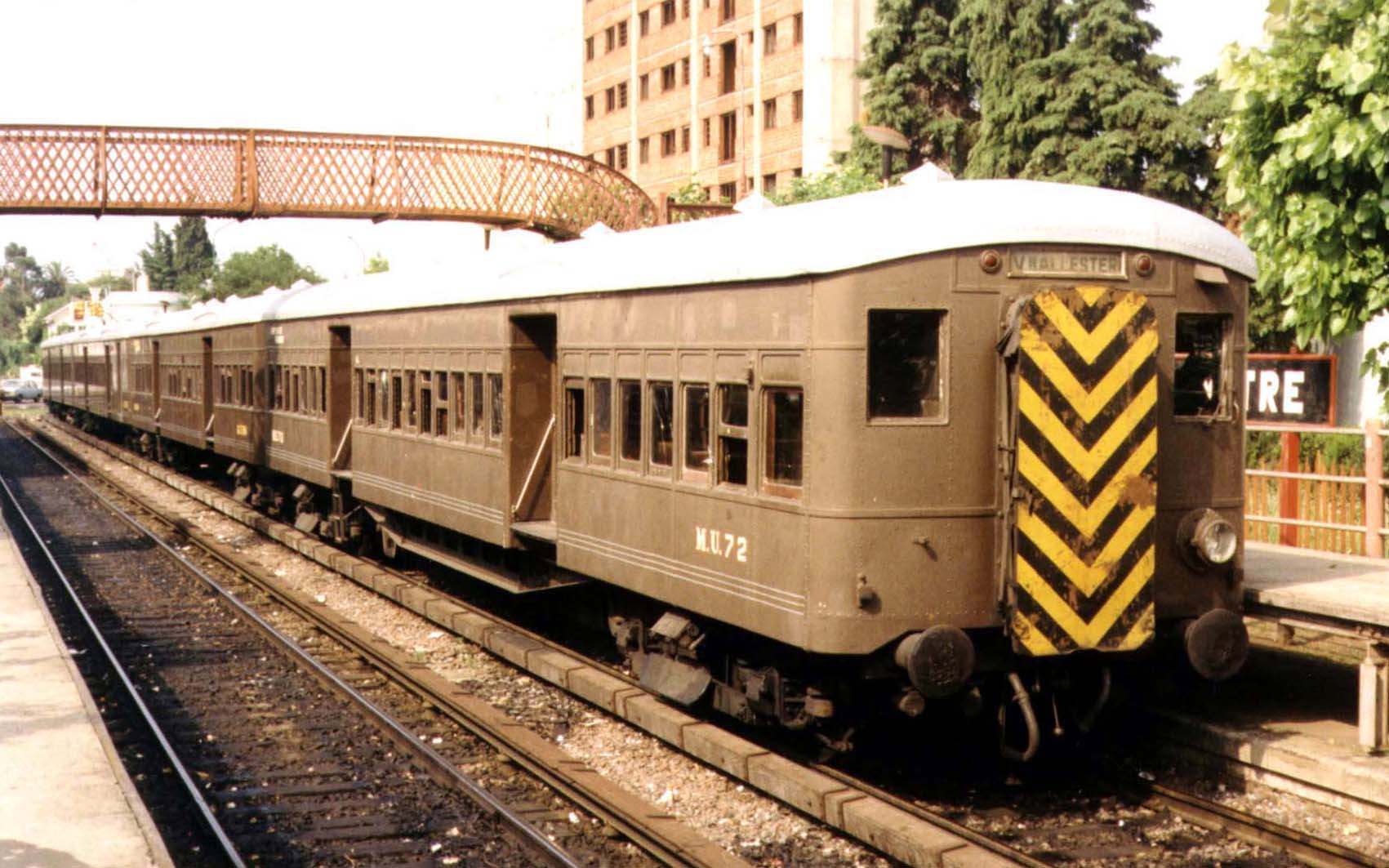
A train with Metropolitan Vickers wagons acquired in the 1910s. They were in use until the 1990s.

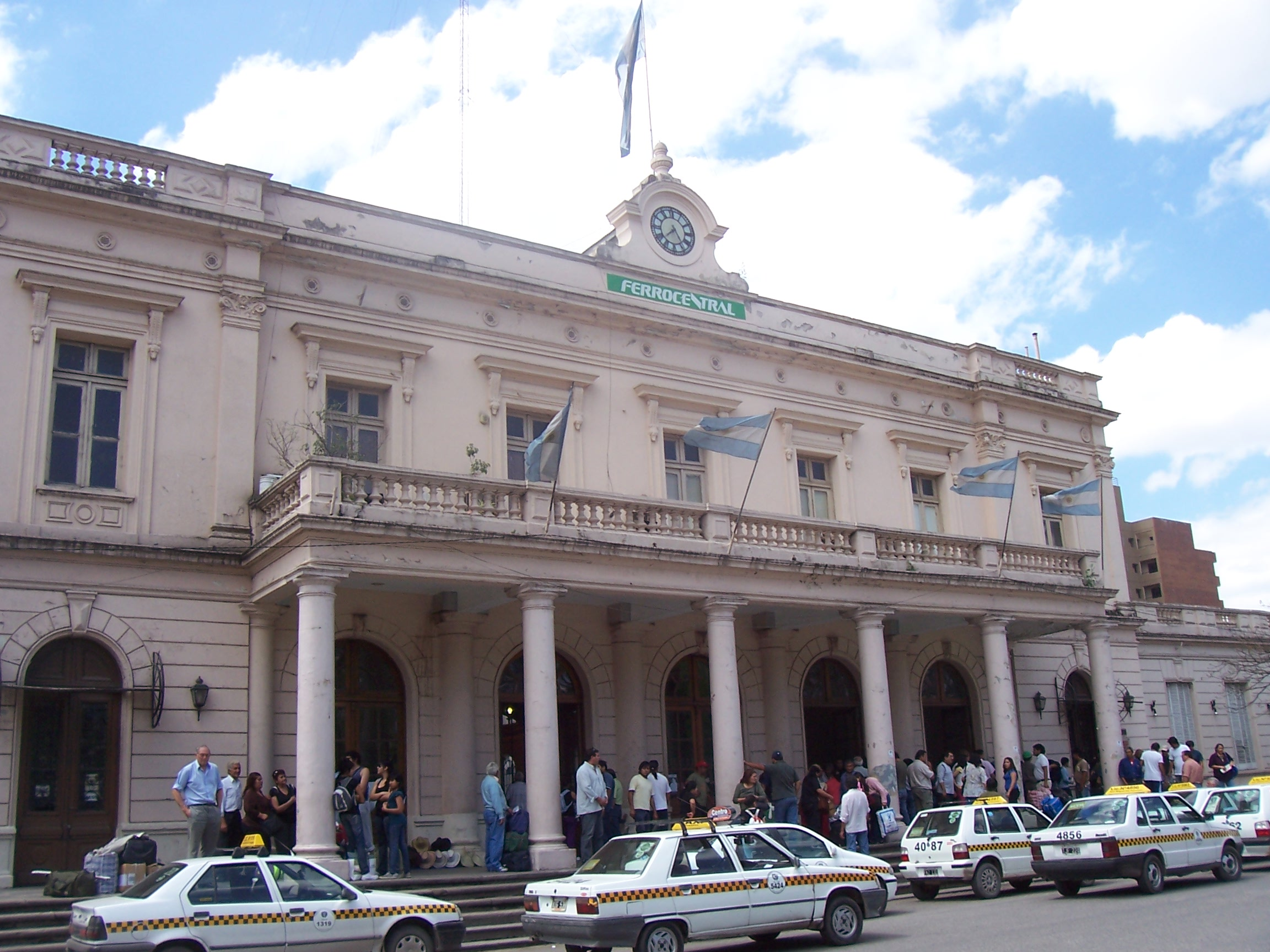
Tucumán station.

After World War II finished, British and French-owned railway companies in Argentina began proceedings with the purpose of selling their railways due to financial problems to operate those services. Finally on March 1, 1948, all the foreign railway companies in Argentina were nationalised under the Juan Perón administration, creating the State-owned company "Empresa de Ferrocarriles del Estado Argentino (EFEA)", then renamed to Ferrocarriles Argentinos, taking over all the railway lines of Argentina, including passenger and freight services.

The following broad gauge railway companies were added to Ferrocarril Mitre network

Ferrocarril Mitre
Former company	Provinces
Central Argentine ^{(1)}	Buenos Aires, Santa Fe, Córdoba, Sgo. del Estero, Tucumán
Rosario & Pto. Belgrano ^{(2)}	Santa Fe, Buenos Aires

Notes:

- ^{(1)} The Central Argentine had previously acquired the BA Northern (1888), BA & Rosario (1902) and Santa Fe Western (1900) railway companies.
- ^{(2)} The north section of the R&PBR (from Rosario to Ingeniero Beaugey) only.

=== Reorganization in Rosario ===
Soon after the reorganization of the nationalized railway system, the Ferrocarril Mitre closed the Ferrocarril Rosario y Puerto Belgrano's Rosario station, moving the passenger services terminus to Rosario Central. A sector of the old station would be later used to build the Ciudad Universitaria of Rosario. The station building was also used as a school of music and the Faculty of Engineering of Rosario established there.

The Rosario Este station was also closed soon after. On the land where it stood, a public park (named "Parque Urquiza") was planted. The Fisherton station was renamed "Antártida Argentina".

In 1977 the most of urban passenger services in the city were cancelled. The Rosario Central station was closed, becoming Rosario Norte the new terminus of the line. Many stations also ceased their activities, such as Antártida Argentina, Barrio Vila, Sarratea, Ludueña and Alberdi. One year later the remaining passenger services were definitely closed.

On November–December 1989 the Ferrocarril Mitre reactivated the Rosario Central station when the Municipality of Rosario launched a passenger service (named "Ferrobús") using the chassis of a bus specially remodeled to run as a train coach. Departing from Rosario Central, the ferrobús crossed the Rosario downtown until the National Flag Memorial when it finished the journey. The ferrobús run four times a day, being soon demanded by a high number of users. Despite the advantages of this service and the satisfactory results, the ferrobús was cancelled by the end of that year and has never returned since.

=== The Buenos Aires section ===
With the railway nationalization, the Retiro train and underground rail stations were renamed "Presidente Perón" honoring former president of Argentina. This lasted until 1955 when the de facto government established after the Revolución Libertadora restored the original names to both terminus.

The Metropolitan Vickers coaches acquired to the British company run for the first time in 1916, when the 28.3 km of the Retiro-Tigre C branch were electrified. Those wagons were introduced to replace the old steam locomotives still running in the line, becoming the first electric rail line in South America. During the 1950s, the possibility to close the branch to Delta del Tigre began to be considered by the national government. It raised due to the Retiro-Tigre branch run laid parallel to Olivos station, carrying much more passengers than the first one. Nevertheless, the project was not carried out during that decade.

Finally, on November 8, 1961, the Government of Argentina (led by Arturo Frondizi) decided to close the branch from Bartlomé Mitre to Delta. Only some freight trains would sporadically run through those tracks until they disappeared definitely. Since the branch felt into disuse, the railway buildings and lands behind the tracks were illegally usurped by homeless families, while on the other hand, groups of neighbors claimed for the re-establishing of the services.

During the government of Frondizi, the State acquired new electric coaches by Japanese company Toshiba for the rest of Mitre urban lines. Due to the Toshiba wagons had another structure than Metropolitan Vickers', new elevated platforms had to be added to each station to allow passengers to enter the trains.

During this period, the services to Zárate and Campana were run with diesel locomotives by US company ALCO. By 1970 the Municipality of Buenos Aires built a tunnel on Avenida del Libertador that passed under the Retiro-Tigre branch. Between 1985 and 1985 Ferrocarriles Argentinos (that run all the urban services by then) signed agreements with different Municipalities of Greater Buenos Aires to build more tunnels to replace the level crossings existing in those districts.

=== The Buenos Aires-Tucumán express ===
The Buenos Aires-Tucumán Express was a service that made its first trip in the 1969 after two years working in the maintenance of the infrastructure of the branch. The service joined Buenos Aires and Tucumán taking 15 hours to make 1,156 km between both cities. The service on board included a restaurant, ambient music, air conditioning among other comforts.

The Express was considered one of the most luxurious trains in the world at the time, becoming one of the most emblematic services by Ferrocarriles Argentinos.

Some of the works made that contributed to the success of the Express included 357 km of new rail tracks in Santiago del Estero Province and José León Suárez in Greater Buenos Aires, reparating and maintenance of rolling stock in Rosario workshops, remodelation of Hitachi coaches in Junín workshops, brand new Fiat-Concord coaches acquired, remodelling of stations, level crossings, bridges, signalling, construction of new platforms, installation of a luggage belts in Retiro, electronic signs in the main stations of the line (Retiro, Tucumán, Rosario, La Banda) indicating departures and arrivals of the trains and the opening of new ticket booths.

The material used included 3,700 tons of rail tracks produced by local metallurgic company Somisa, 50,000 tons of ballast, 700 tons of metallic accessories and 8,000 protectors for the third rail.

=== Tren de la Costa ===
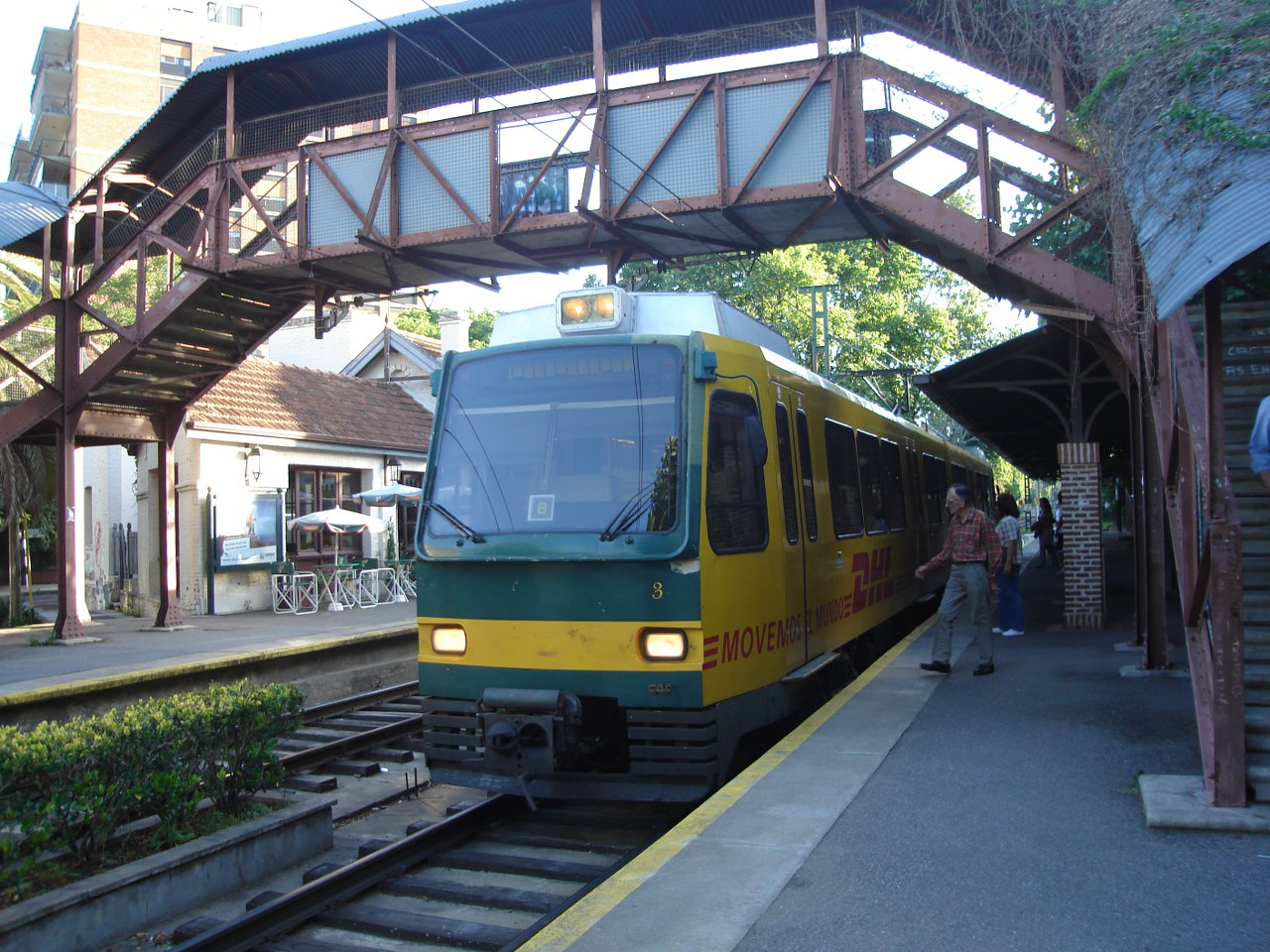
Train of private company Tren de la Costa.

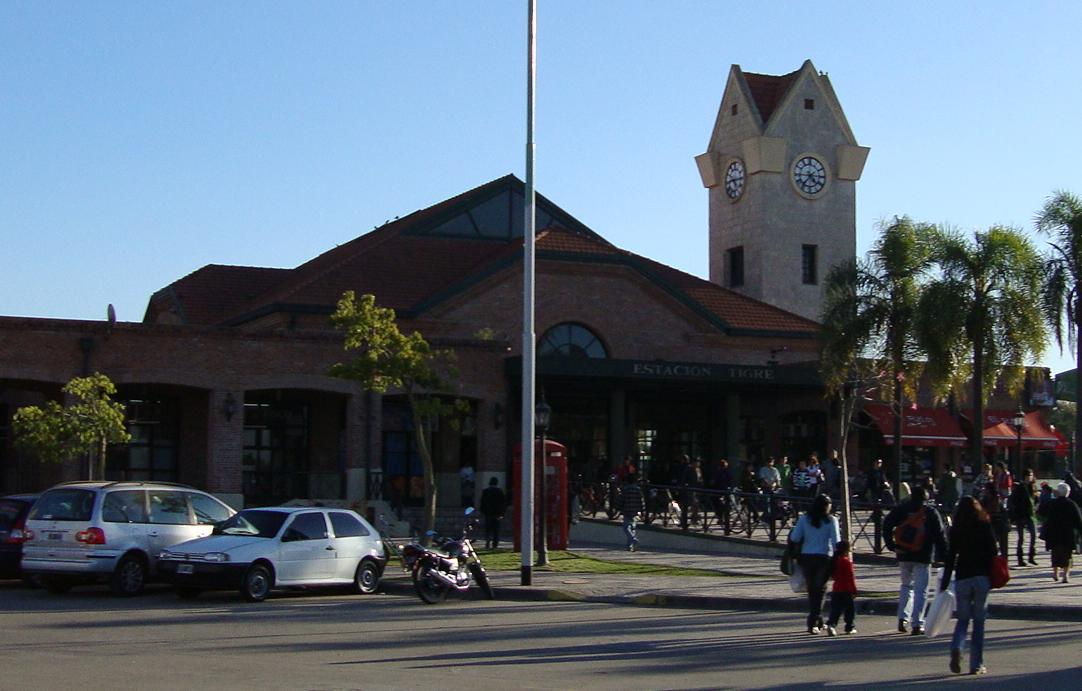
The new Tigre station building, opened in 1995.

In September 1990 the project to re-open the Mitre-Delta branch was reactivated. Tren de la Costa S.A., a company of local Sociedad Comercial del Plata, owned by Santiago Soldati, won the tender and began the works to reactivate the branch. The company remodeled the 8 stations of the branch and built 3 new stations, most of them with the concept of shopping mall centers, being San Isidro the most representative of this tendence.

A new terminus, named "Maipú" was built just in front of former terminus Bartolomé Mitre. Both stations were connected through a pedestrian bridge over Maipú Avenue. Unlike the Retiro-B. Mitre branch, the new Maipú-Delta service was a light rail system, using two-car train sets acquired to Spanish company Construcciones y Auxiliar de Ferrocarriles (CAF).

The service between Maipú-Delta was opened in April 1995.

The project delayed more than a year until on December 7, 1994, the train made its first trip from Delta-Libertador. Then President of Argentina Carlos Menem attended the celebration. The official opening was on April 20, 1995 when the first train departed from new station Maipú to Delta, launching the passenger service 5 days later.

During the first years of existence, the branch carried an average of 100,000 passenger (on weekends) due to it had been conceived as a tourist train, with Maipú, Libertador and San Isidro as its main commercial centres. Beside Delta terminus, a new amusement park, "Parque de la Costa" was built, self-proclaiming "the largest in South America". Parque de la Costa -opened in April 1997- invested US$100 million to be constructed. Two years later, the "Trillenium Casino" opened beside the park and Delta station. SCP and Grupo Bolt invested A$ 70 million. The new gamble center had 1,800 slots machines, 76 game table and 2 electronic roulettes.

Successive economic crashes such as Tequila crisis of Mexico (1994) and Asia financial crisis (1997) caused a decrease of the number of passenger carried by the company, affecting not only the train services but the amusement park as well. The SCP asked the national government a grant to continue operating the trains but the request was denied due to the concession contract did not include the possibility of granting subsidies because Tren de la Costa was categorized as a tourism train unlike the rest of the lines that were a public passenger transport.

After a progressive decrease of the number of passengers carried and the closure of most of shops in the stations, The Government of Argentina revoked the concession to SCP, taking over the Tren de la Costa through its subsidiary SOFSE.

== Suburban services ==
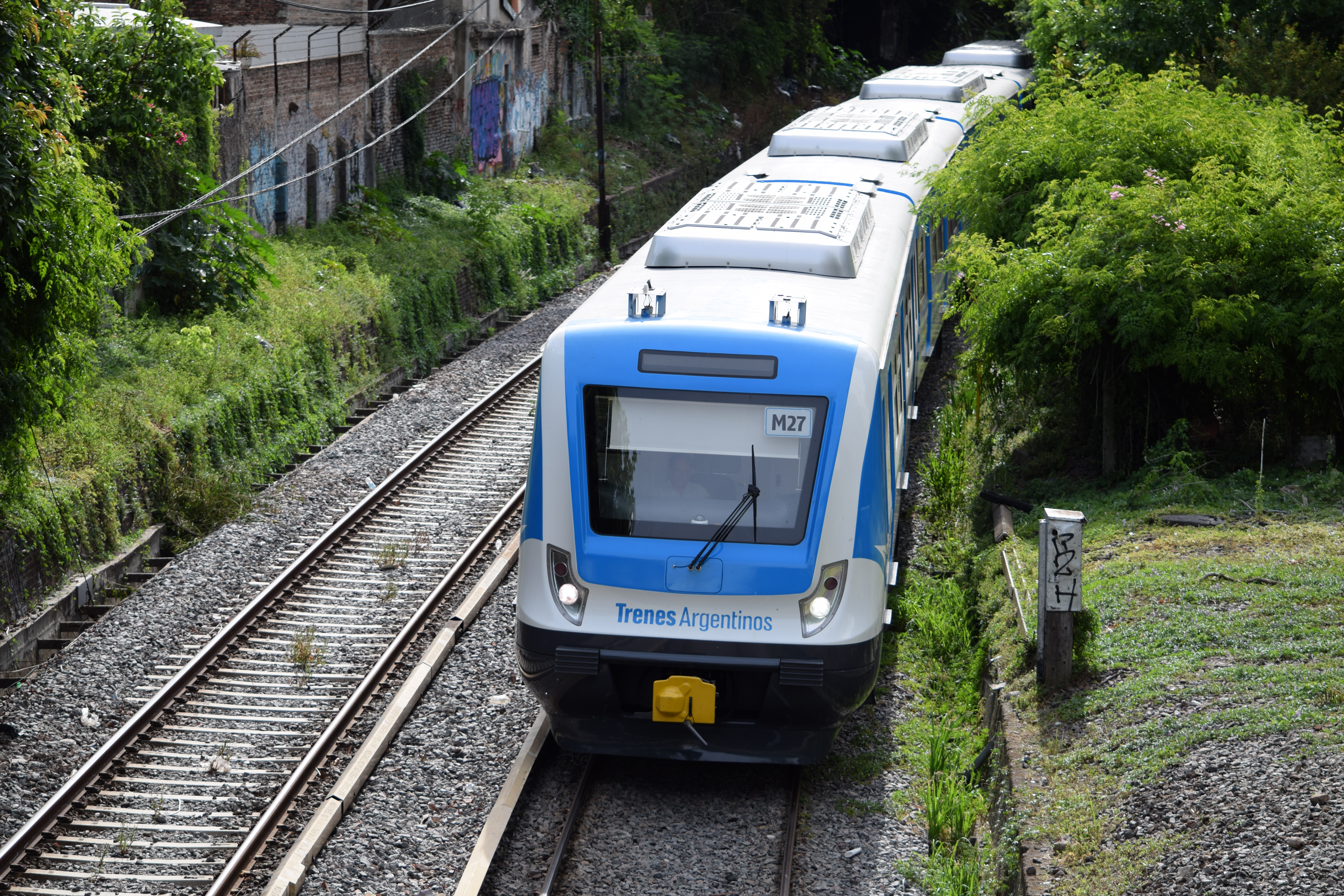
A CSR electric multiple unit in Buenos Aires.

In the metropolitan sector of the City of Buenos Aires there is an electrified commuter branch that operates from the Retiro terminus in the Buenos Aires neighbourhood of Retiro, to several suburban locations in Greater Buenos Aires.

When the Government of Argentina decided to privatize all the urban railway services in 1992, Mitre Line (the urban passenger service of Ferrocarril Mitre) was given in concession to Trenes de Buenos Aires (or TBA, which also took over Sarmiento Line) through Decree N° 730/95.

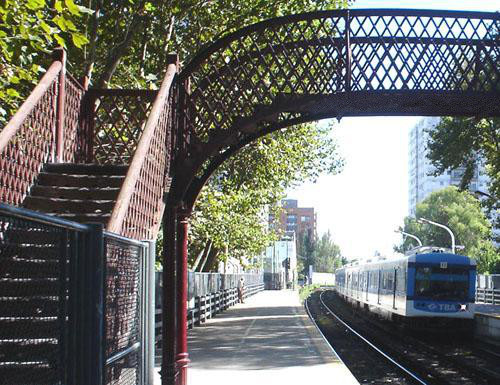
Núñez station. The old iron bridges installed by the Central Argentine are still in use.

During the first two years of concession, TBA met the requirements specified on the contract, about the frequency of the service, with an average of 98%. By February 1999 the consortium had invested US$200 million, including the reconstruction of 220 Toshiba wagons, the remodelling of 13 stations and workshops. In addition, a new ticket-selling system was introduced with the installation of vending machines.

One of the most notable improvements was the introduction of "Puma" coaches in the Retiro-Tigre branch. This coaches were built by local factory Emprendimientos Ferroviarios (EMFER) and featured air conditioning, ABS brakes and computer-supervising systems.

In 1997 the government decided to modify the contracts of concession with a plan of modernization for US$2,500 million. The future investments required to acquire 492 brand-new electric coaches, refurbishing of more than 100 km of existing tracks, and the installation of new signalling, among other improvements.

Nevertheless, the government of Fernando De la Rúa (who had come to power in 1999) made changes to the original project, reducing the amount of the budget to US$1,300 million. To a compensation to the companies, the State granted subsidies to TBA (and the rest of the private operators) as a way to compensate the losses and avoid tariffs to increase.

Due to this politic and the lack of investments in Mitre Line, the quality of the service decreased considerably. TBA operated the line until the 2012 Once station rail disaster happened. As a result, the national government revoked the concession granted to TBA and gave the Mitre and Sarmiento to State operator UGOFE, that managed the line until 2014 when it was given under concession to Corredores Ferroviarios S.A.

In 2014 the government announced the acquisition of new coaches to replace the existing electric Mitre Line rolling stock. The new trains were manufactured by Chinese company CSR Corporation Limited, the first to arrive in June 2014.

== Freight services ==
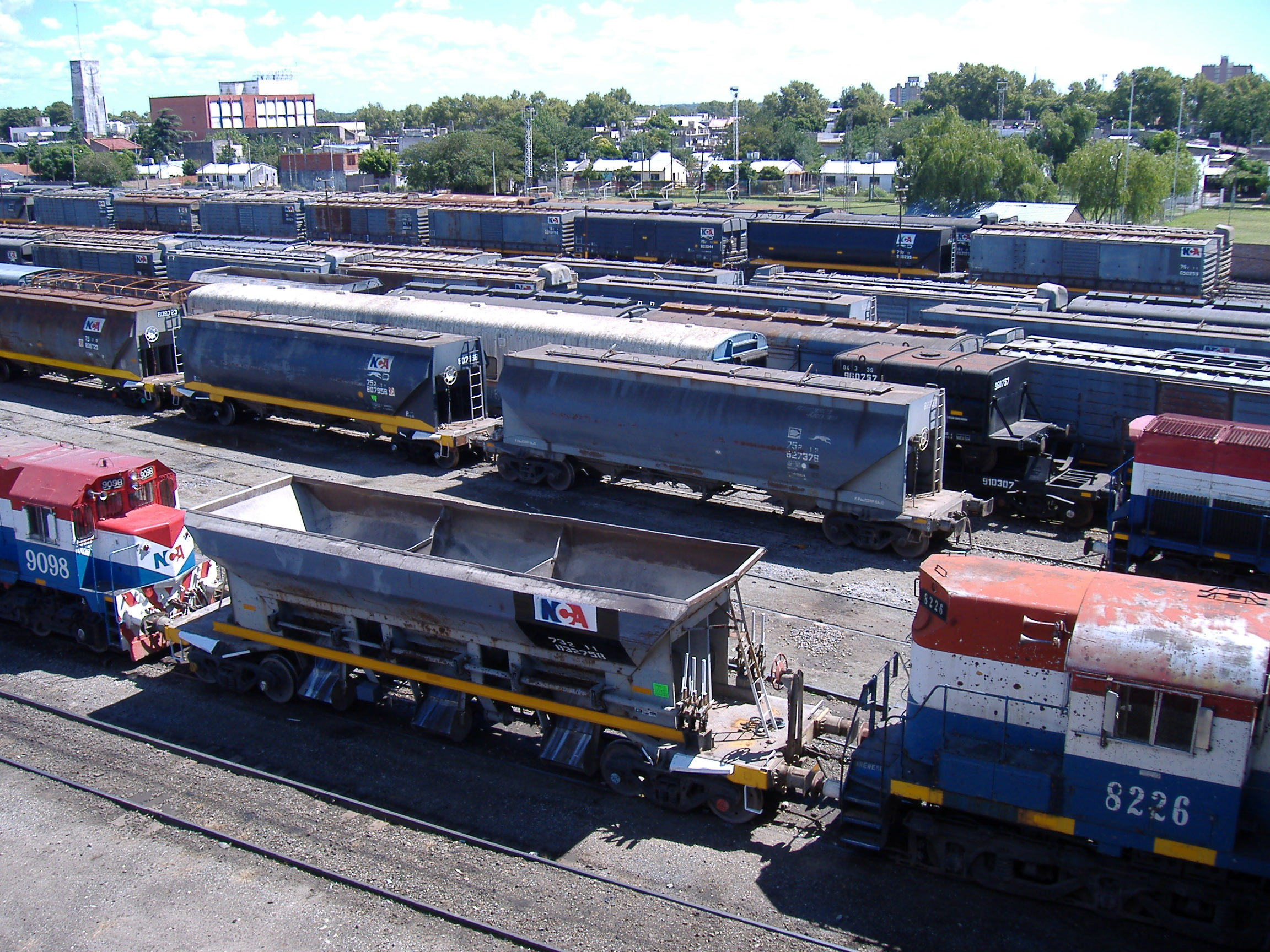
NCA freight trains in Rosario

By the beginning of the 1990s, the economic situation of State-owned Ferrocarriles Argentinos became critical. Through National Decree N° 520/91 the Government of Argentina created residual company FEMESA to run the urban passenger services in Buenos Aires. Ferrocarriles Argentinos continued operating the freight and passenger interurban services.

On March 10, 1993, A new decree by President Carlos Menem established all the passenger interurban railways ceased their activities. The only way to reactivate the lines would be if the provincial governments took over the services.

About the freight services, the government proceeded to tender for the operating of the lines, establishing a fee that consortiums would pay to the Argentine State. Finally, in April 2002 the government awarded private company Nuevo Central Argentino (NCA), formed by local companies Aceitera General Deheza, Banco Francés del Río de la Plata, Asociación de Cooperativas Argentinas and Román Marítima, the operation and mainteaneance of Ferrocarril Mitre.

NCA began operating on December 23, 1992, run trains through Buenos Aires, Córdoba, Santa Fe, Santiago del Estero and Tucumán provinces, with a total of 4,512 km. The new consortium established its headquarters at Rosario, Santa Fe.

At the moment of the beginning of concession, Ferrocarriles Argentinos only run the 45% of the system line because of the terrible deterioration of the tracks or the absence of ballastro that did not allow trains to run. The assets received by NCA included 63 diesel locomotives (of those only 23 active) and 5,354 wagons (with only 60% in acceptable condition to run).
