= Nortel Certifications =

IT professional certification

Nortel Certifications are IT professional certifications for Nortel products and IEEE standard technologies. There were two major levels of certification, Specialist and Expert. Within each level were three sublevels; technology, support, and design. The certification exams were administered at Prometric testing centers. Various training courses were held by Nortel regional training partners, such as Global Knowledge. As Nortel began to exit certain businesses and divest itself, they retired various certification training programs and exams. They retired the GSM-related programs in March 2008, Optical and Carrier VoIP programs in September 2009, and lastly the Enterprise programs in November 2010.

== Nortel Certified Technology Specialist (NCTS) ==
The Technology certification is a starting point for validating education of basic technology knowledge, and a foundation for other professional certifications.

== Nortel Certified Support Specialist (NCSS) ==
The NCSS certification demonstrates application of entry level knowledge with regard to the installation, administration, configuration, maintenance, and troubleshooting of Nortel products and solutions.

== Nortel Certified Design Specialist (NCDS) ==
The NCDS certification demonstrates application of entry level knowledge with regard to the planning, design, and engineering of a network consisting of Nortel products.

== Expert Certifications ==
=== Nortel Certified Technology Expert (NCTE) ===
The NCTE certification builds upon the knowledge required for the NCTS certification. A NCTE demonstrates advanced technical proficiency with underlying network technologies and protocols.

=== Nortel Certified Support Expert (NCSE) ===
The NCSE certification builds upon the knowledge required for the NCSS certification. A NCSE demonstrates application of advanced level knowledge with regard to the installation, administration, configuration, maintenance, and troubleshooting of complex networks consisting of multiple products and networking functionality.

=== Nortel Certified Design Expert (NCDE) ===
The NCDE certification builds upon the knowledge required for the NCDS certification. A NCDE demonstrates application of advanced level knowledge with regard to the planning, design, and engineering of complex networks consisting of multiple products and underlying functionality.

== Architect Certification ==
=== Nortel Certified Architect (NCA) ===
The NCA certification was Nortel's highest credential and required expert-level knowledge of all three core areas: technology, design, and support.
