= Nuevo Central Argentino =

Argentine private freight railway company

Nuevo Central Argentino S.A.

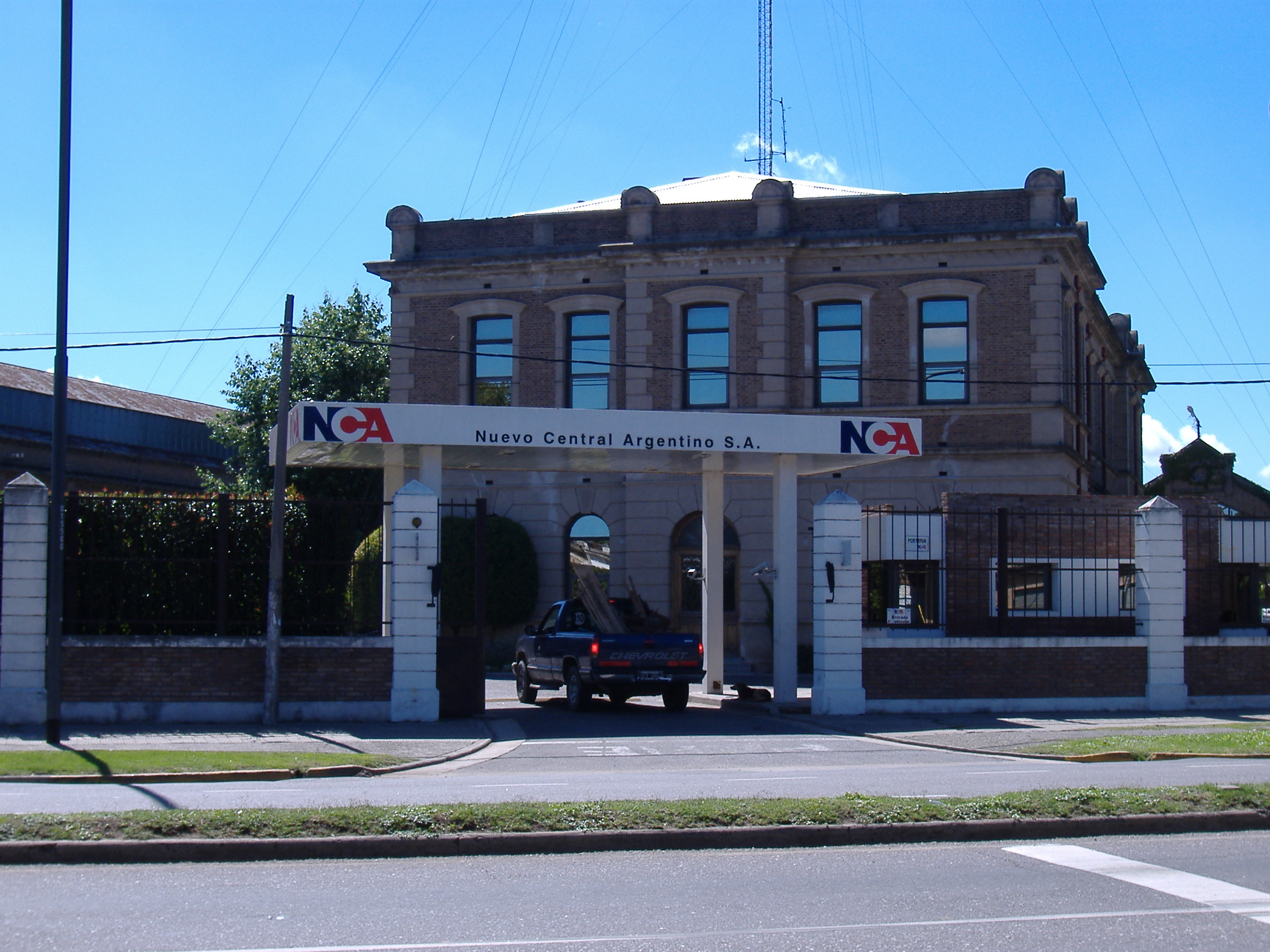
- NCA headquarters in Rosario
- Type: S.A.
- Industry: Rail transport
- Predecessor: Ferrocarriles Argentinos
- Founded: 1992; 34 years ago in Argentina
- Headquarters: Rosario, Argentina
- Area served: Centre and north west of Argentina
- Production output: 7,408,914 tonnes carried (2014)
- Services: Rail freight transport
- Net income: 873,000 (2014)
- Owner: Aceitera General Deheza
- Number of employees: 1,360 (2013)

Nuevo Central Argentino S. A. (abbreviated NCA) is an Argentine company that utilises the operation and infrastructure of the national railway system of the former Mitre Railway division of Ferrocarriles Argentinos, by a concession granted on 23 December 1992 as part of railway privatisation carried out during the presidency of Carlos Menem.

NCA operates about 5,000 km of 5 ft 6 in (1,676 mm) Indian gauge cargo railroad lines in the provinces of Buenos Aires, Santa Fe, Córdoba, Santiago del Estero and Tucumán. Its headquarters are located in Rosario (province of Santa Fe); its warehouses are located in Rosario, in nearby Villa Gobernador Gálvez, and in Villa María (province of Córdoba). There are also operational centers in Colombres and Córdoba City, and transfer (truck changing?) centers in the city of Tucumán and in Retiro, Buenos Aires.

NCA, which is owned by Aceitera General Deheza S.A., carried 7,408,914 tonnes of freight in 2014.

== History ==
By the beginning of the 1990s, the economic situation of State-owned Ferrocarriles Argentinos became critical. Through National Decree N° 520/91 the Government of Argentina created residual company FEMESA to run the urban passenger services in Buenos Aires. Ferrocarriles Argentinos continued operating the freight and passenger interurban services.

On March 10, 1993, A new decree by President Carlos Menem established all the passenger interurban railways ceased their activities. The only way to reactivate the lines would be if the Provincial Governments took over the services.

About the freight services, the Government proceed to tender for the operating of the lines, establishing a fee that consortiums would pay to the Argentine State. Finally, in April 2002 the Government awarded private company Nuevo Central Argentino (NCA), formed by local companies Aceitera General Deheza, Banco Francés del Río de la Plata, Asociación de Cooperativas Argentinas and Román Marítima, the operation and maintenance of Ferrocarril Mitre.

NCA began operating on December 23, 1992, run trains through Buenos Aires, Córdoba, Santa Fe, Santiago del Estero and Tucumán provinces, with a total of 4,512 km (2,804 mi). The new consortium established its headquarters at Rosario, Santa Fe.

At the moment of the beginning of concession, Ferrocarriles Argentinos only ran the 45% of the system line because of the terrible deterioration of the track or the absence of ballast that did not allow trains to run. The assets received by NCA included 63 diesel locomotives (of those only 23 active) and 5,354 wagons (with only 60% in acceptable condition to run).

== Gallery ==
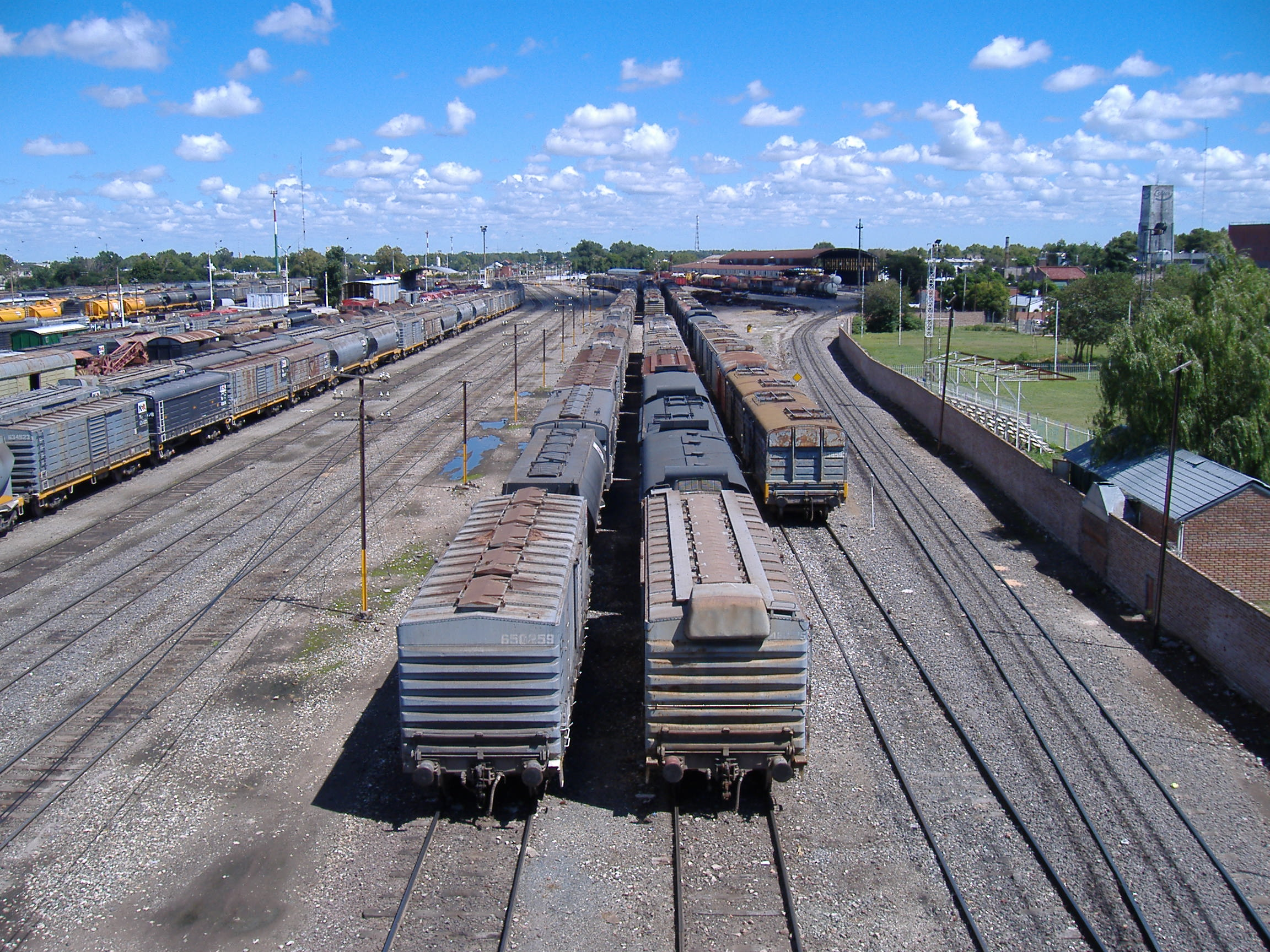
Patio Parada (Maintenance yard)

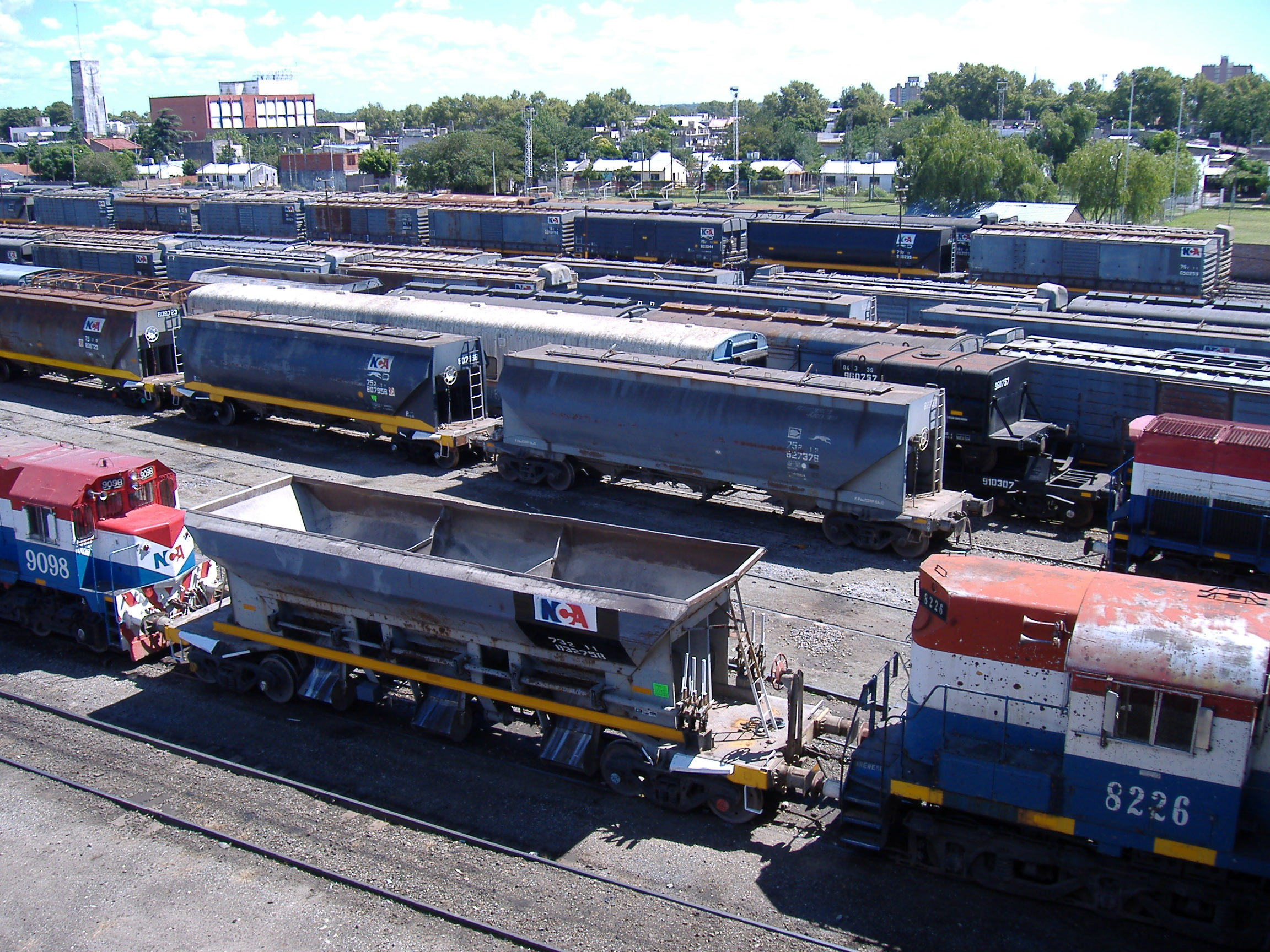
NCA locomotives at Patio Parada in Rosario

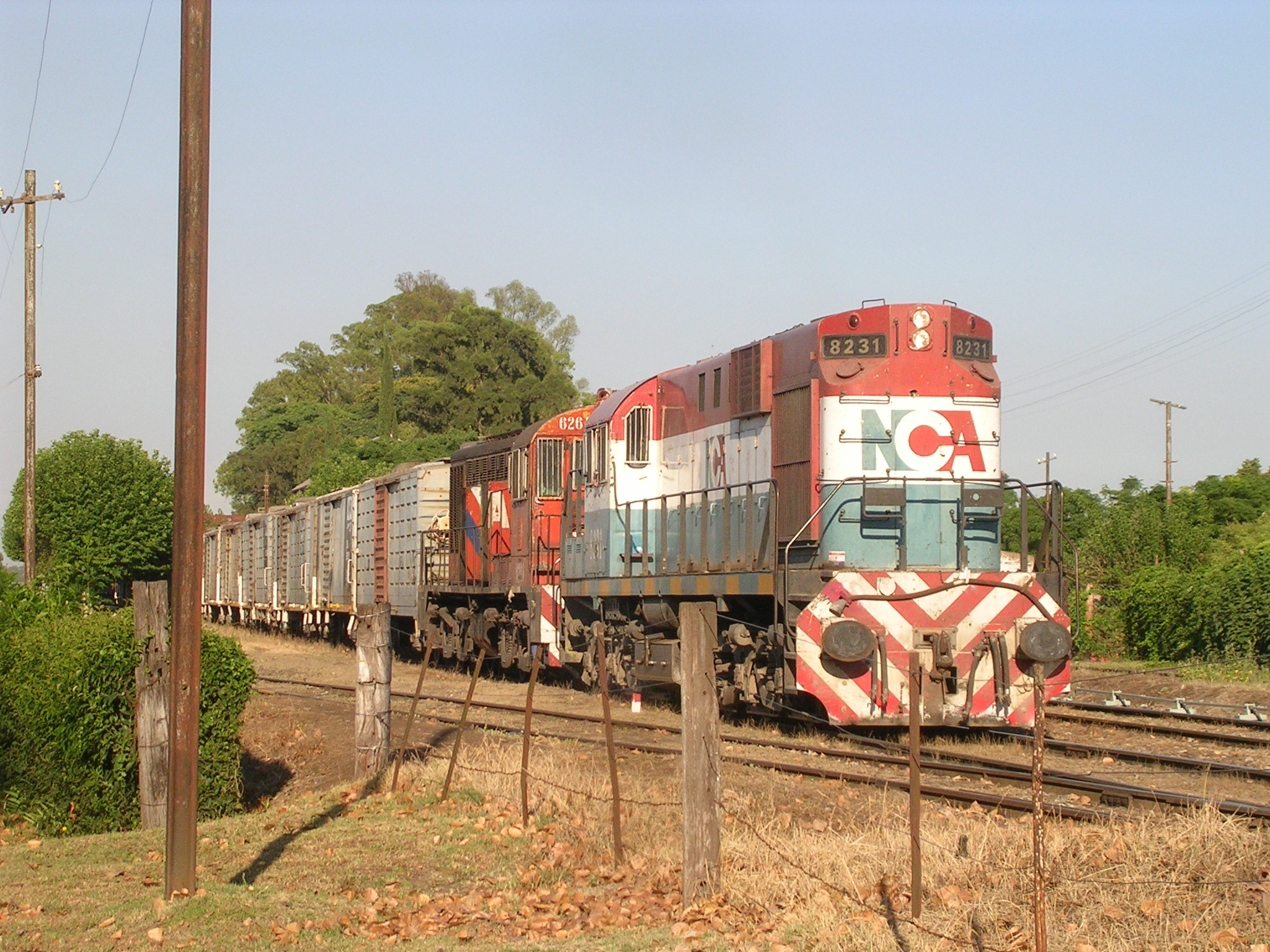
NCA's Alco RSD-16

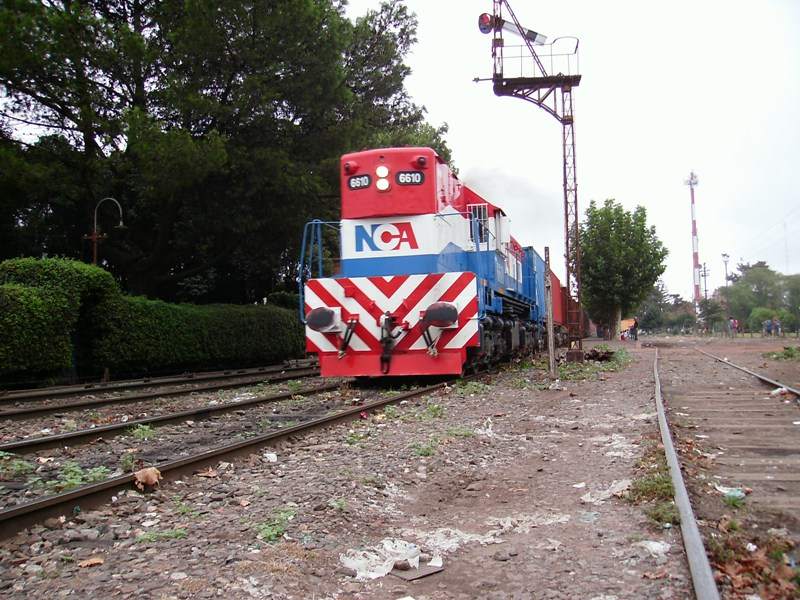
An NCA freight train in Escobar

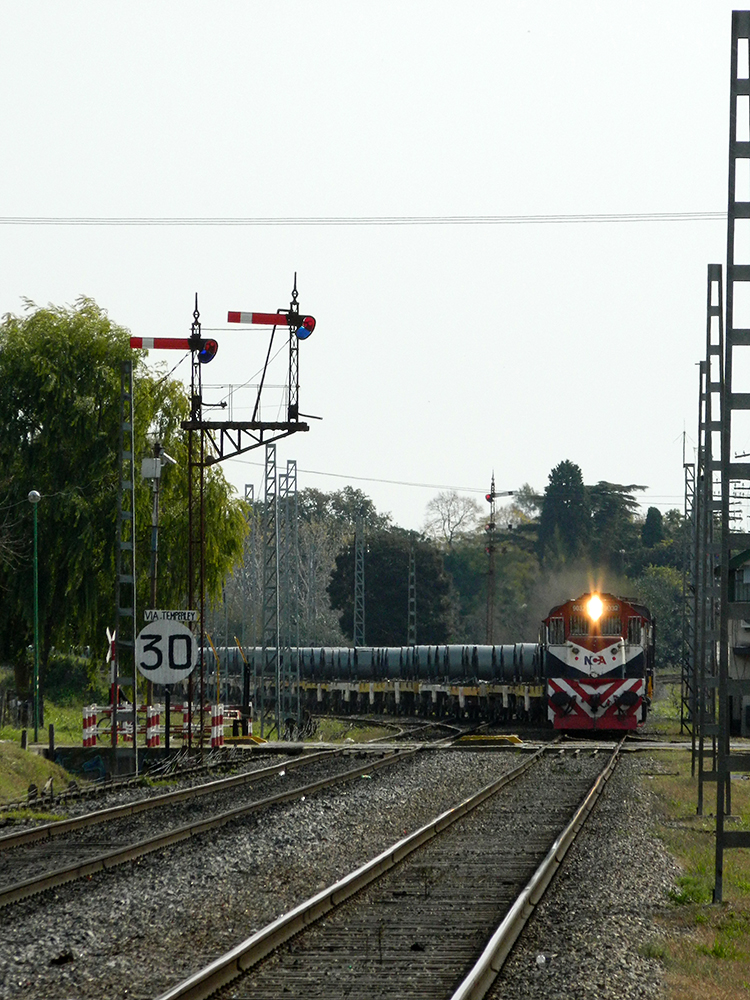
An NCA freight train
