= Santa Fe (Belgrano) railway station =

Railway station in Santa Fe de la Vera Cruz, Argentina

Coordinates: 31.6375°S 60.6872°W

Santa Fe
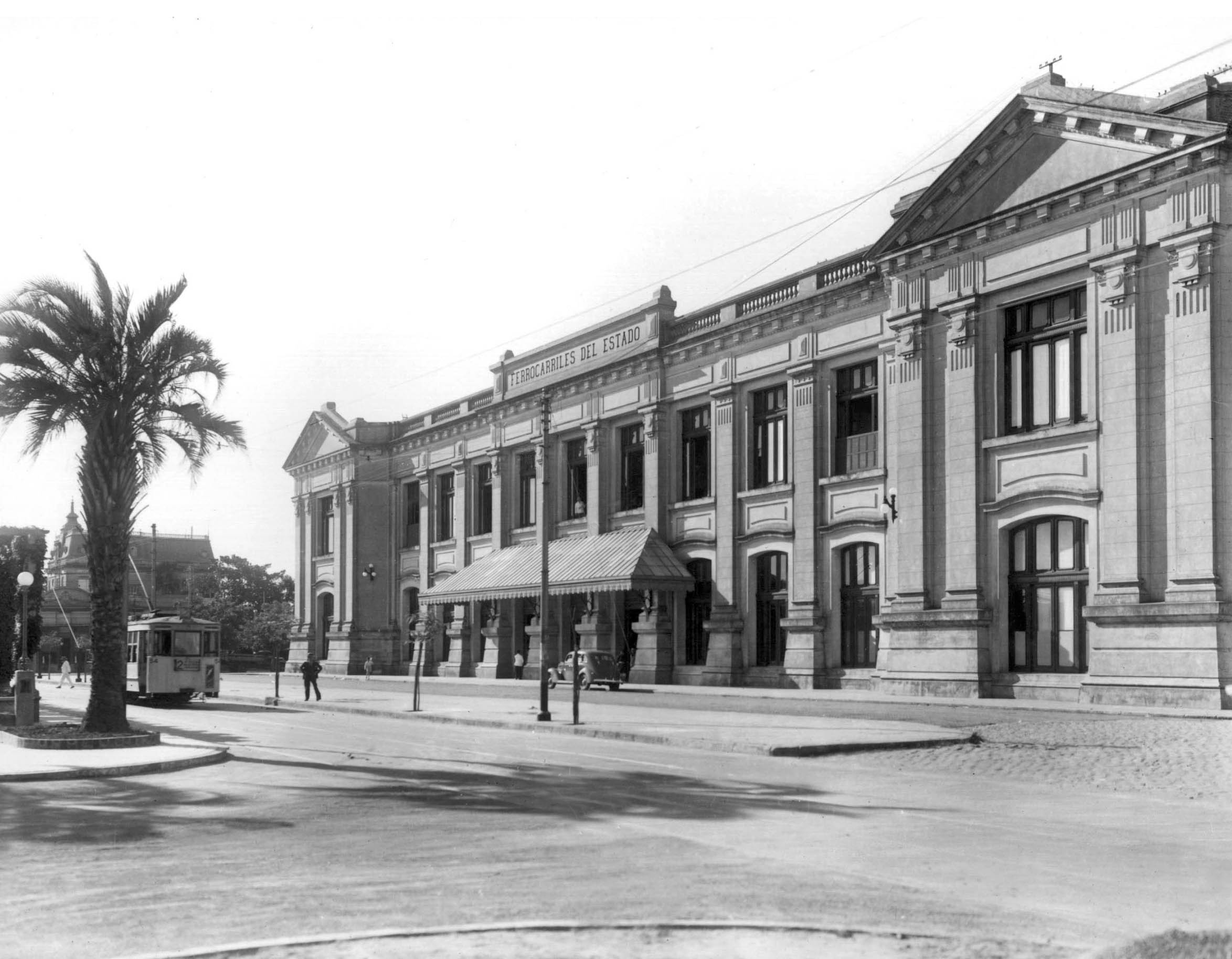
- Santa Fe station building and a tram running on Gálvez Boulevard, c. 1940.

General information
- Location: Boulevard Gálvez 1150, Santa Fe; Argentina
- System: Inter-city
- Owner: Government of Argentina
- Line: Belgrano
- Distance: 468 km (291 mi) from Buenos Aires
- Train operators: Central Northern (1928-48); Ferrocarriles Argentinos (1948-93)

History
- Opened: 1928
- Closed: 1993; 33 years ago
Location

Santa Fe is a former railway station located in the city of Santa Fe de la Vera Cruz in Santa Fe Province, Argentina. Having been closed in March 1993 after the Government of Argentina closed all the long-distance services in Argentina, the station was reopened by the local Municipality as a convention center.

== History ==
The station was originally built by state-owned Central Northern Railway that opened it to public in 1928. The Santa Fe station was part of the large CN's network that connected the province with cities such as Buenos Aires, Córdoba, Santiago del Estero Province, Tucumán, and Chaco among others.

When the whole Argentine railway network was nationalised during Juan Perón's presidency, the Santa Fe station came to be operated by Belgrano Railway, one of the six divisions of state-owned Ferrocarriles Argentinos. FA operated trains to Jujuy and Salta provinces, being Santa Fe one of the intermediate stops on the route.

On March 10, 1993, president Menem signed the decree for which all the long distance passenger services were definitely closed, with Santa Fe being included among them. The entire Belgrano Railway lost all its services carried until then, with the exception of freight transport that continued operating through Belgrano Cargas, a consortium that took over Belgrano Railway in 1999. It operated until 2008, when the Government led by Cristina Fernández revoked the contract of concession. In 2013, a recently created company, Belgrano Cargas y Logística took over the lines previously operated by Belgrano Cargas. Nevertheless, the freight services operated never included the city of Santa Fe so the station continued with no use and entering into a deterioration process.

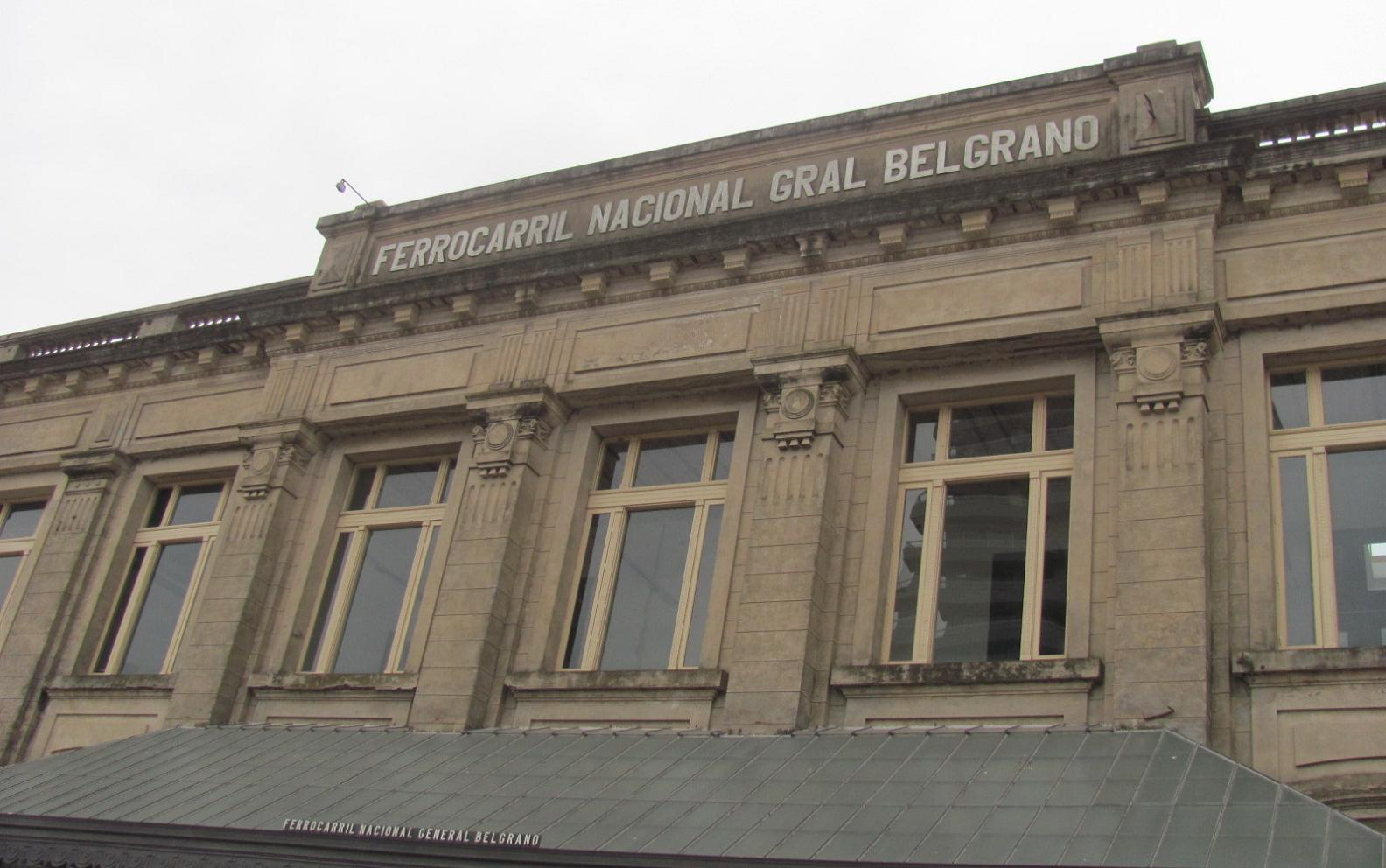
Upper facade of Santa Fe building in 2013.

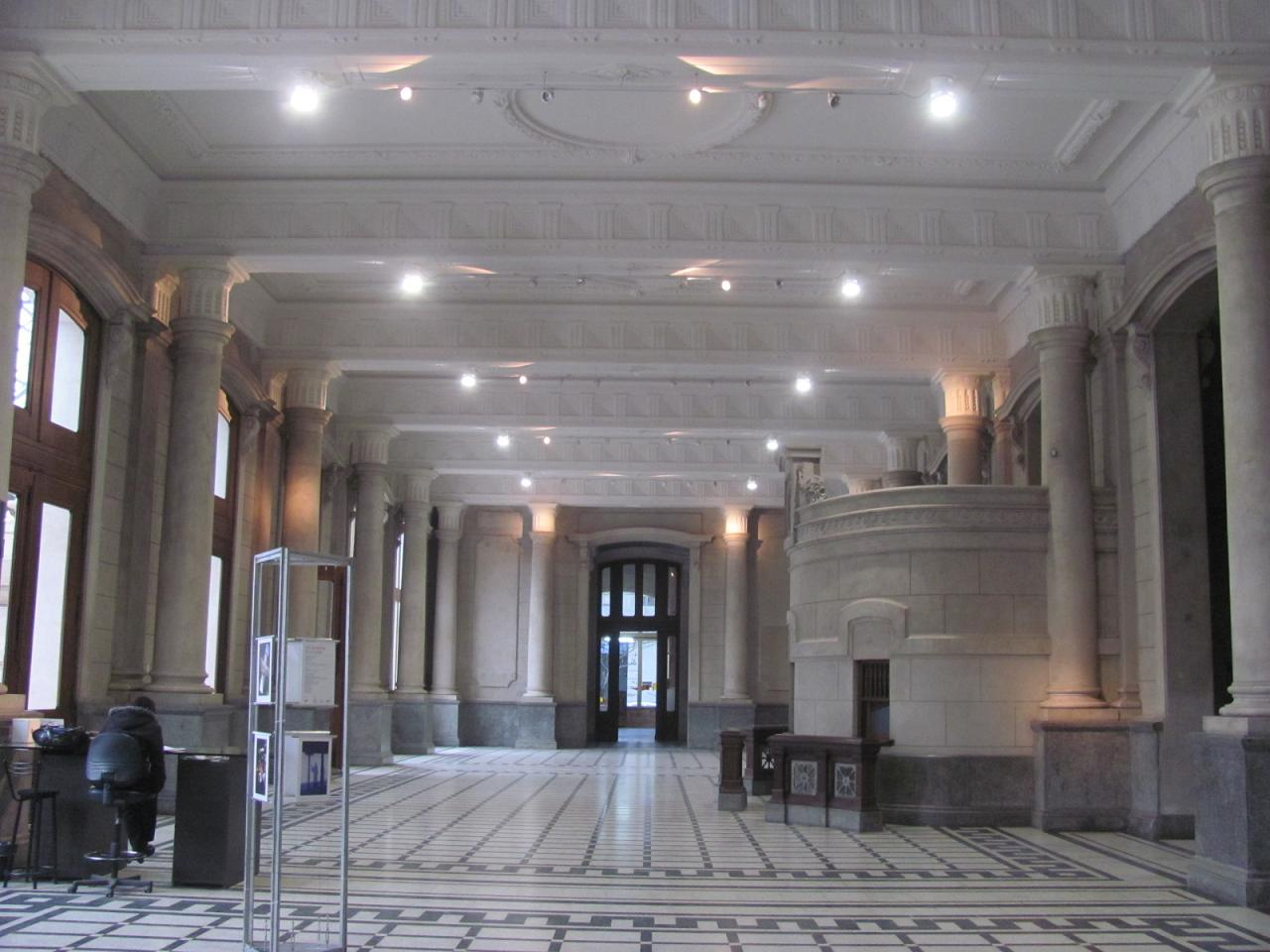
Halls after remodelling.

In 2008, the Cencosud consortium featured a project to build a shopping mall in the former station, with a cost of A$ 100 million and the creation of 1,200 job positions. After analyzing the proposal, the National Government granted Cencosud a concession to exploit the Belgrano station for commercial purposes.

On the other hand, the Municipality of Santa Fe featured its own project that consisted in remodelling the station with no commercial purposes (unlike the proposal by Cencosud).

With the station still owned by the National government and concession already given to Cencosud, the municipality started works of refurbishment in January 2009 at an initial cost of A$326,000. In April that same year, the Administración de Infraestructura Ferroviarias (ADIF) summoned the Municipal government to cease works. Finally in July 2010 both, the ADIF and the municipality reached an agreement by which the municipal government received the station in concession for a term of 10 years (with the possibility to be extended). By October that year, A$3,000,000 had been investing in remodelling the station.

The remodelled Belgrano station building was put into service again as multi-purpose building that included both, convention and administrative centres, and the seat of local Secretary of Tourism. A parking lot with capacity for 200 vehicles was also built.

In 2014, the state-owned Operadora Ferroviaria Sociedad del Estado took over passenger services in Argentina, reestablishing some services to Santa Fe Province but only to Rosario Sur and Rufino stations. As of June 2015, there are no plans to run trains to Santa Fe station.

== Historic operators ==
Operator	Period
(United Kingdom) Central Northern Railway	1928–1948
(Argentina) Ferrocarriles Argentinos	1948–1993
