= Santa Fe (Mitre) railway station =

Railway station in Santa Fe, Argentina

Santa Fe
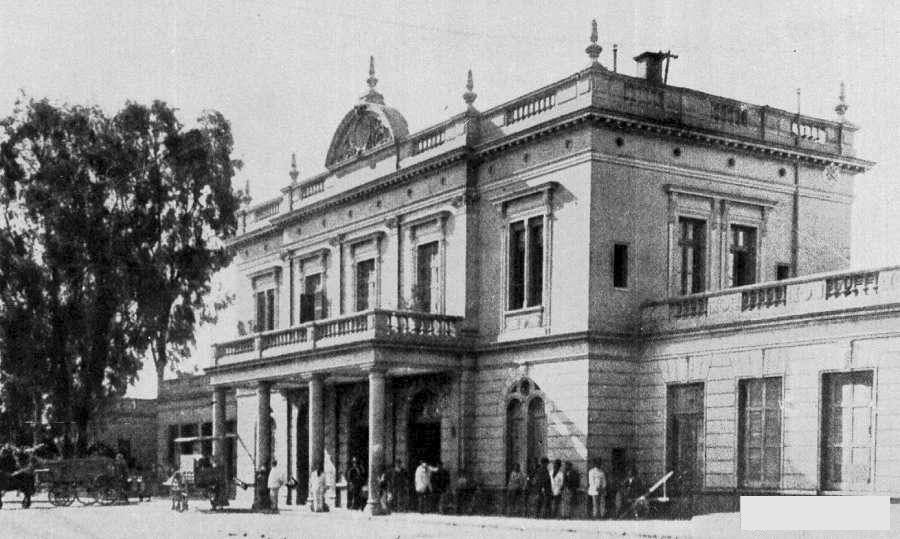
- The station during the first years of 20th. Century

General information
- Location: Zavalla and Gral. López, Santa Fe; Argentina
- Coordinates: 31.6542°S 60.7242°W
- System: Inter-city
- Owner: Government of Argentina
- Line: Mitre
- Distance: 468 km (291 mi) from Buenos Aires
- Platforms: 2

History
- Opened: 1891
- Closed: 2007; 19 years ago
Location

Santa Fe is a railway station located in the city of Santa Fe, Argentina in the province of the same name, Argentina. The station is no longer used for railway services since 2007, when defunct company Trenes de Buenos Aires cancelled its services to Santa Fe.

== History ==
The station was originally built by British-owned Buenos Aires and Rosario Railway in 1889, being inaugurated two years later. In 1908 it became part of also British Central Argentine Railway when it took over the BA&RR.

When the whole Argentine railway network was nationalised during Juan Perón's presidency, the Santa Fe station came to be operated by Mitre Railway, one of the six divisions of state-owned Ferrocarriles Argentinos.

On March 10, 1993, president Menem signed the decree for which all the long distance passenger services were definitely closed, with Santa Fe being included among them.

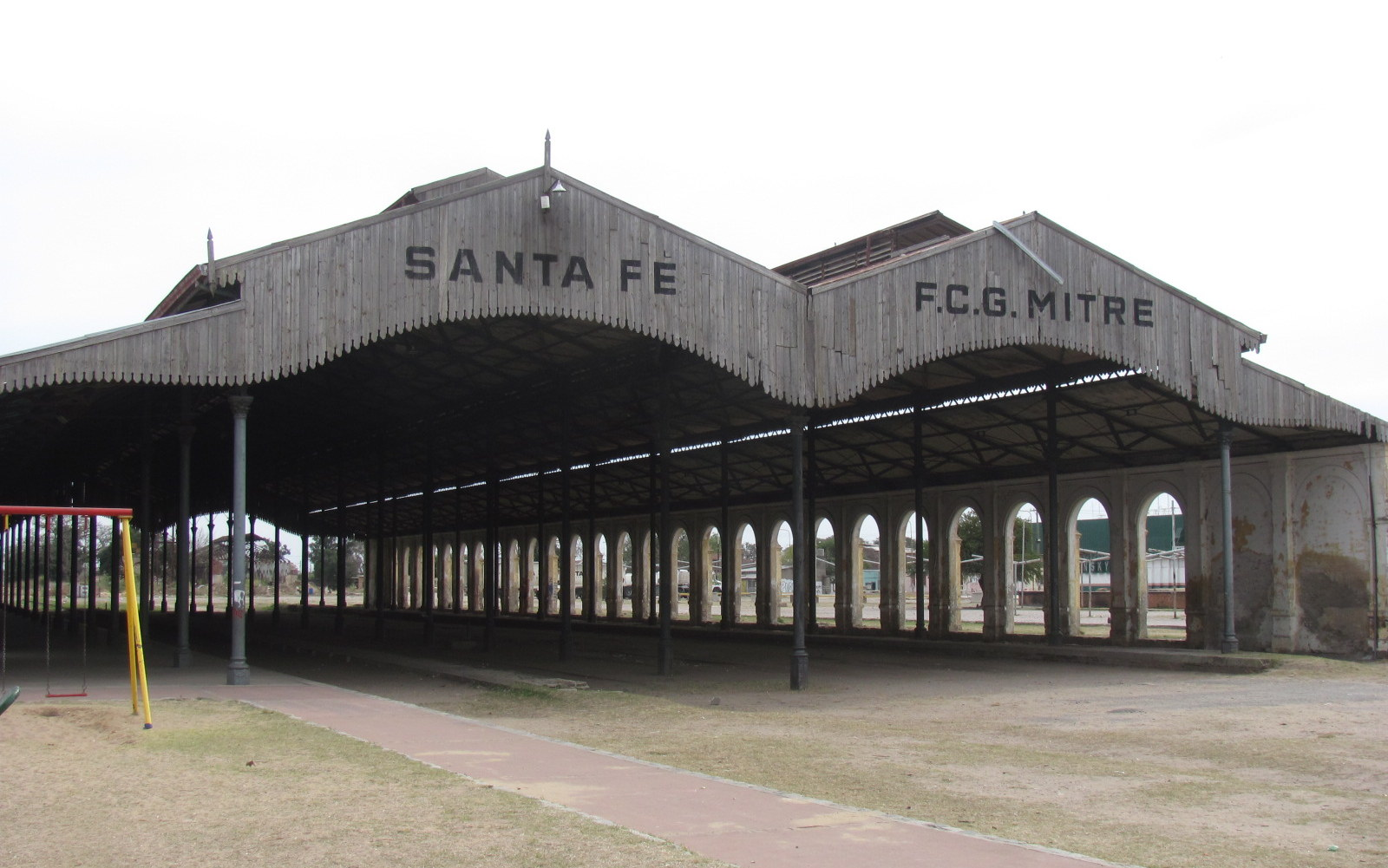
Empty station platforms in 2013.

Trenes de Buenos Aires (that had taken over the operation of Mitre Line in 1995) started to run long-distance trains to Santa Fe Province. With services initially serving only Rosario Sur, TBA added a train to Santa Fe (that also crossed Rosario Norte) in September 2003. Services to Santa Fe ceased in 2007 and Following a commuter train accident on February 22, 2012, at Once Station, Buenos Aires, in which 51 people died and at least 703 people were injured, TBA was placed under federal intervention on February 28; its concessions to operate the Mitre and Sarmiento lines were ultimately revoked on May 24.

In 2008, the Municipality of Santa Fe announced that the station building would be used to host all the street fairs of the city, although it was also used for cultural activities.

In 2014, the state-owned Operadora Ferroviaria Sociedad del Estado took over passenger services in Argentina, reestablishing some services to Santa Fe Province but only to Rosario Sur and Rufino stations. As of June 2015, there are no plans to reactivate Santa Fe station as a railway stop.

=== Operators ===
Company	Period
(United Kingdom) BA & Rosario R.	1891–1908
(United Kingdom) Central Argentine	1908–1948
(Argentina) Ferrocarriles Argentinos	1948–1993
(Argentina) TBA	1995–2007
