= Santa Fe Airport =

Santa Fe Airport may refer to:

- Santa Fe Municipal Airport, Santa Fe, New Mexico, New Mexico, United States
- Sauce Viejo Airport (Aeropuerto de Santa Fe—Sauce Viejo), Santa Fe, Argentina
