= Sebastián Caballero =

Argentine footballer

Personal information
- Full name: Sebastián Ignacio Caballero
- Date of birth: 6 January 1992 (age 34)
- Place of birth: Santa Fe, Argentina
- Height: 1.70 m (5 ft 7 in)
- Position: Right midfielder

Team information
- Current team: Rodos

Senior career*
Years	Team	Apps	(Gls)
2009–2015	Unión-SF	34	(0)
2012–2013	→ Merlo (loan)	13	(0)
2016–2017	Paraná-ARG	28	(1)
2017–2019	Volos	49	
2019	Niki Volos	0	(0)
2019–2020	Cerignola		
2020–	Rodos		
- * Club domestic league appearances and goals

Sebastián Ignacio Caballero (born 6 January 1992) is an Argentine professional footballer who plays as a right midfielder for Rodos.

== Career ==
Caballero made his entrance into senior club football with Unión Santa Fe in June 2009, making his professional debut at aged seventeen during an away victory against Aldosivi in Primera B Nacional. He didn't feature for the club again until 2013–14, which followed a loan spell with fellow second tier team Deportivo Merlo; with whom he made thirteen appearances for. In January 2016, after nine years and thirty-four matches - including in the 2015 Argentine Primera División after promotion - with Unión Santa Fe, Caballero left to sign for Atlético Paraná. One goal in twenty-eight fixtures followed over two campaigns.

On 31 July 2017, Gamma Ethniki side Volos completed the signing of Caballero. In his first season, the club were promoted to the Greek Football League as he played twenty-four times. He was released at the conclusion of 2018–19, after one goal in twenty-five league games as Volos won a second consecutive promotion. In August 2019, Caballero joined newly promoted Football League team Niki Volos. However, on 1 October 2019, he left for Italian Serie D club Audace Cerignola. July 2020 saw Caballero head back to Greece with Rodos.

== Career statistics ==
As of 18 July 2020.

Club statistics
Club	Season	League			Cup		League Cup		Continental		Other		Total	
Club	Season	Division	Apps	Goals	Apps	Goals	Apps	Goals	Apps	Goals	Apps	Goals	Apps	Goals
Unión Santa Fe	2008–09	Primera B Nacional	1	0	0	0	—		—		0	0	1	0
Unión Santa Fe	2009–10	Primera B Nacional	0	0	0	0	—		—		0	0	0	0
Unión Santa Fe	2010–11	Primera B Nacional	0	0	0	0	—		—		0	0	0	0
Unión Santa Fe	2011–12	Primera División	0	0	0	0	—		—		0	0	0	0
Unión Santa Fe	2012–13	Primera División	0	0	0	0	—		—		0	0	0	0
Unión Santa Fe	2013–14	Primera B Nacional	14	0	0	0	—		—		0	0	14	0
Unión Santa Fe	2014	Primera B Nacional	12	0	0	0	—		—		0	0	12	0
Unión Santa Fe	2015	Primera División	7	0	0	0	—		—		0	0	7	0
Unión Santa Fe	Total		34	0	0	0	—		—		0	0	34	0
Deportivo Merlo (loan)	2012–13	Primera B Nacional	13	0	0	0	—		—		0	0	13	0
Atlético Paraná	2016	Primera B Nacional	2	0	0	0	—		—		0	0	2	0
Atlético Paraná	2016–17	Primera B Nacional	26	1	0	0	—		—		0	0	26	1
Atlético Paraná	Total		28	1	0	0	—		—		0	0	28	1
Volos	2018–19	Football League	25	1	2	0	—		—		0	0	27	1
Niki Volos	2019–20	Football League	0	0	0	0	—		—		0	0	0	0
Career total			100	2	2	0	—		—		0	0	102	2

== Honours ==
Volos

- Gamma Ethniki: 2017–18
- Football League: 2018–19
