= Santa Fe, Argentina =

Capital city of Santa Fe Province, Argentina

Santa Fe de la Vera Cruz
- City
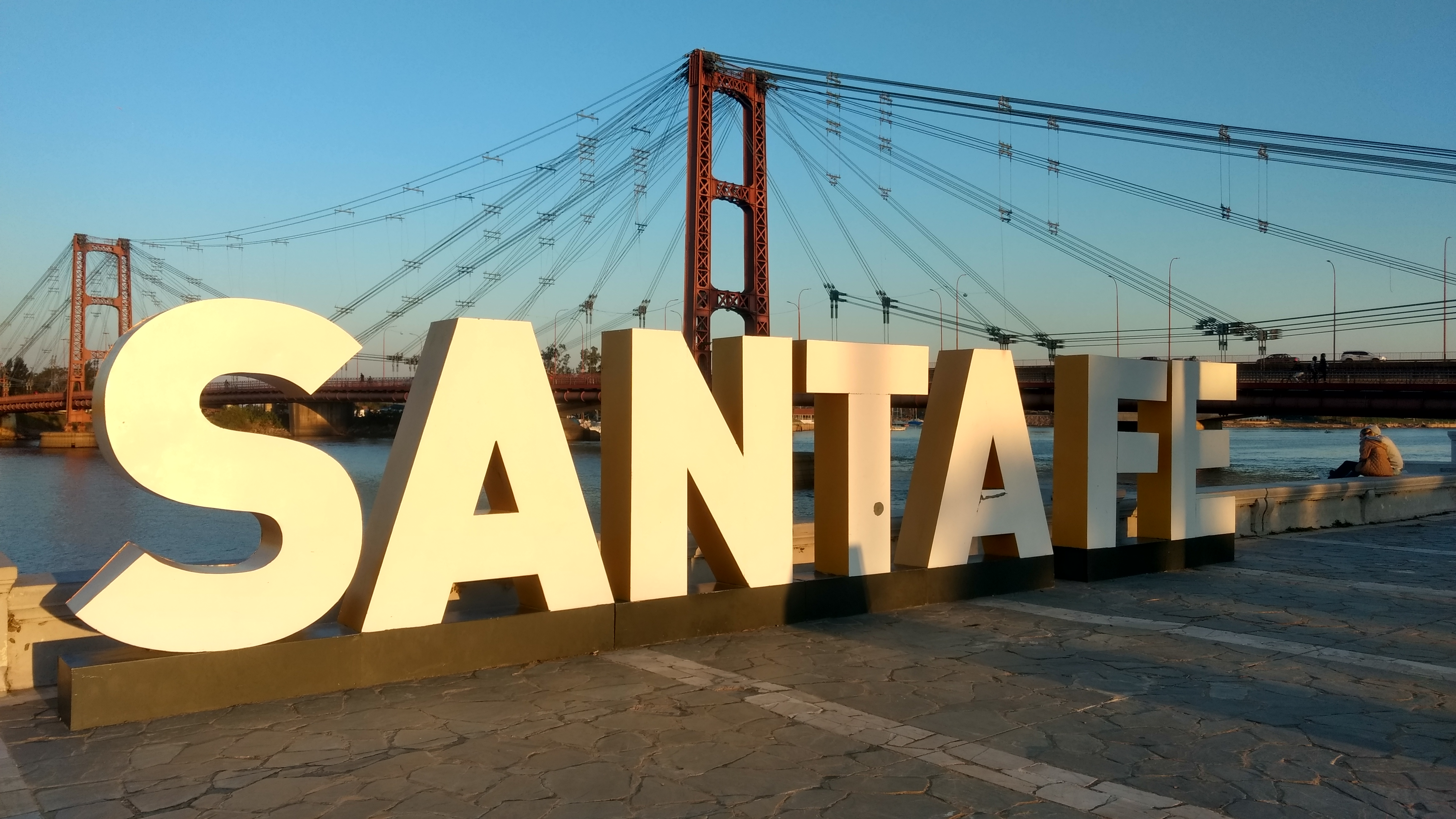
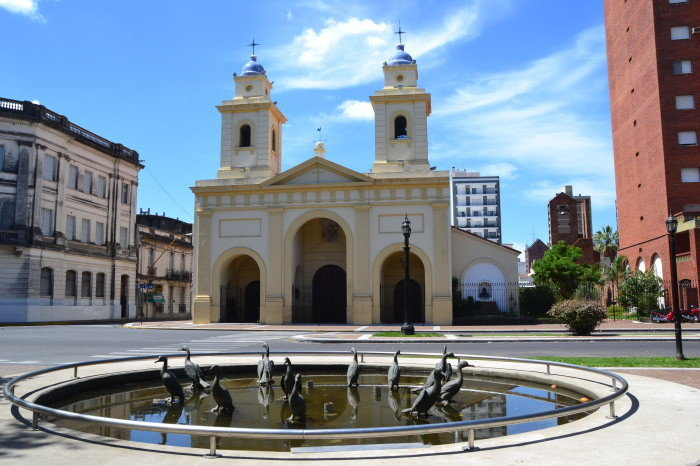
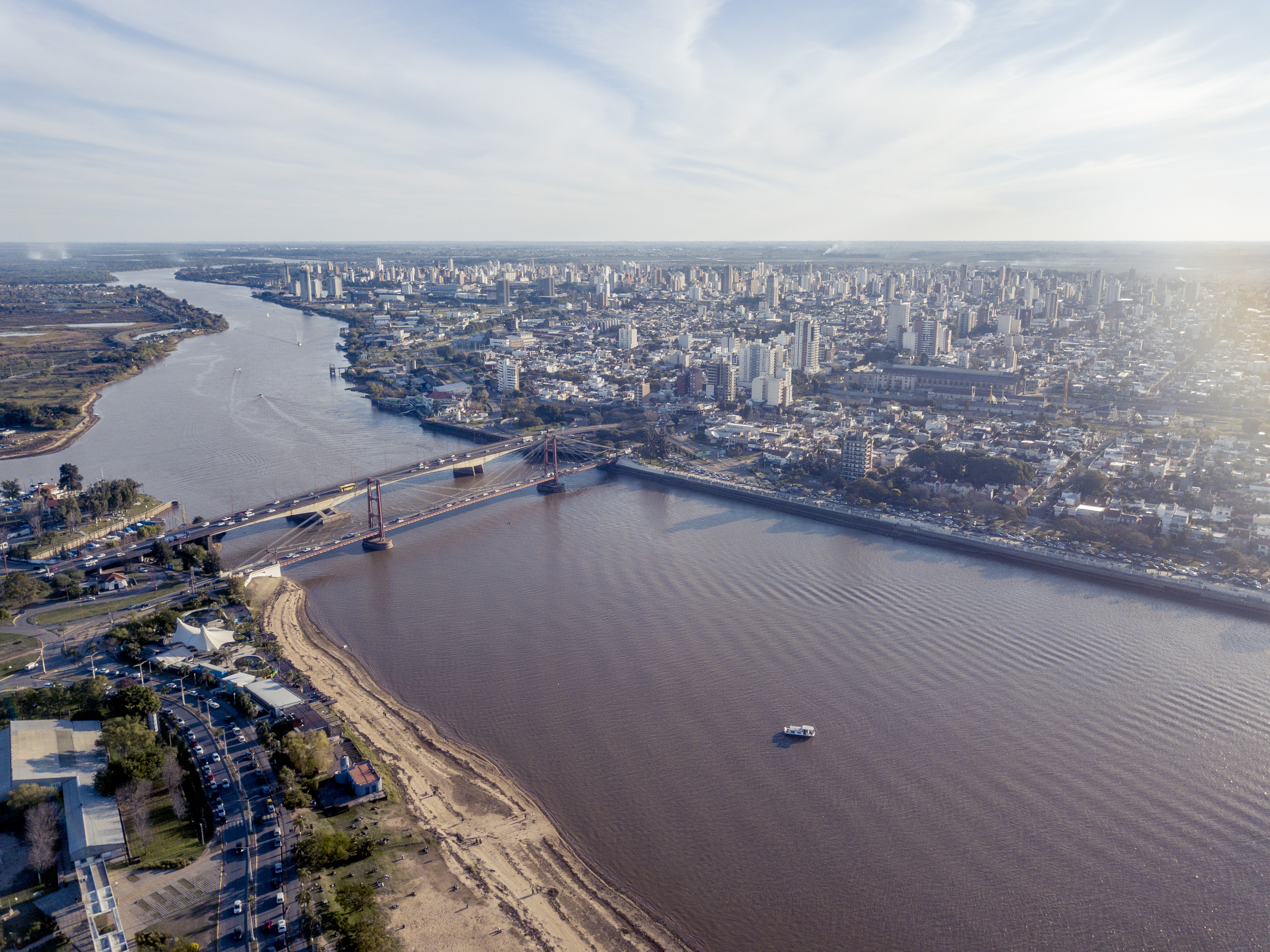
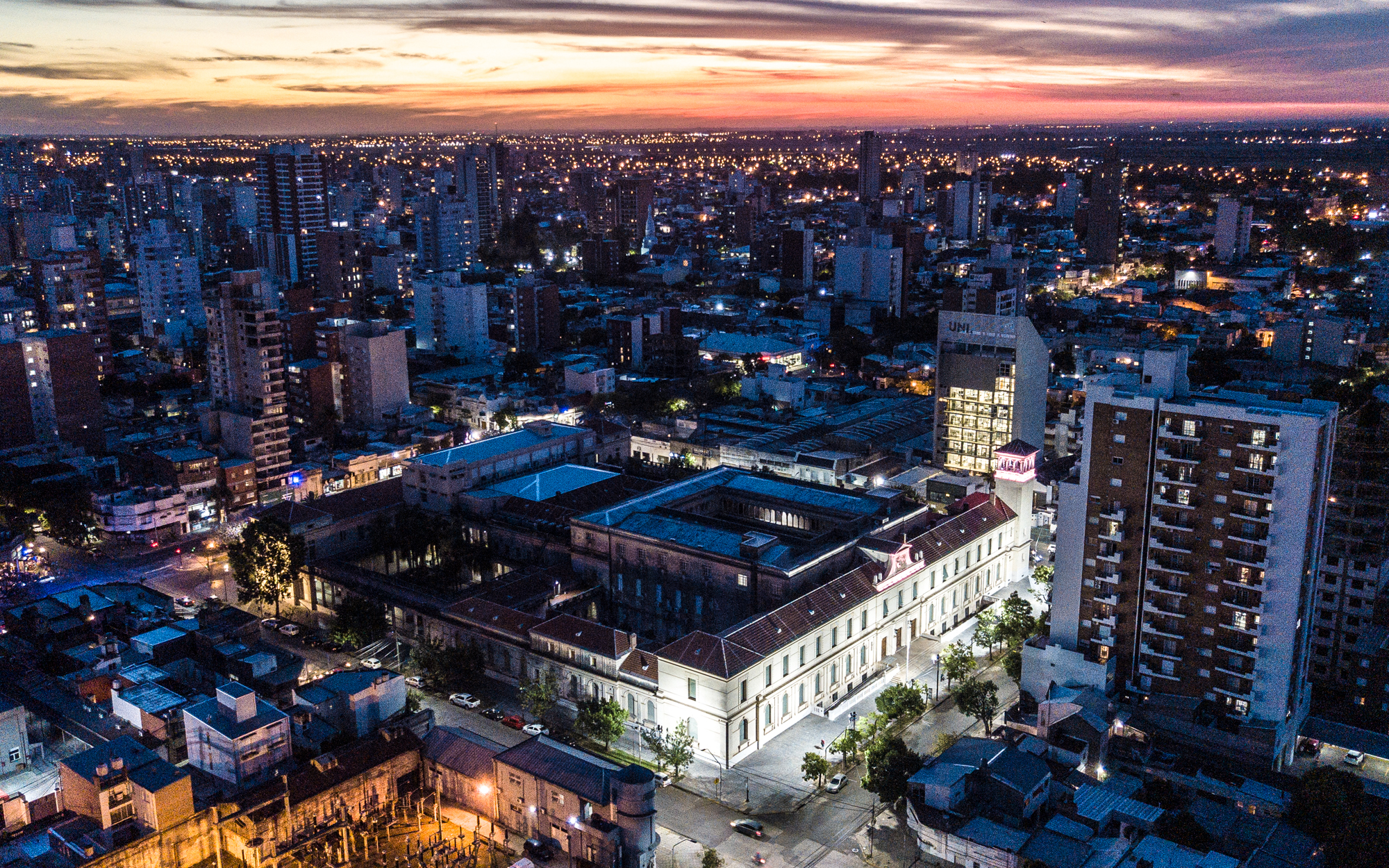
- Santa Fe, Argentina

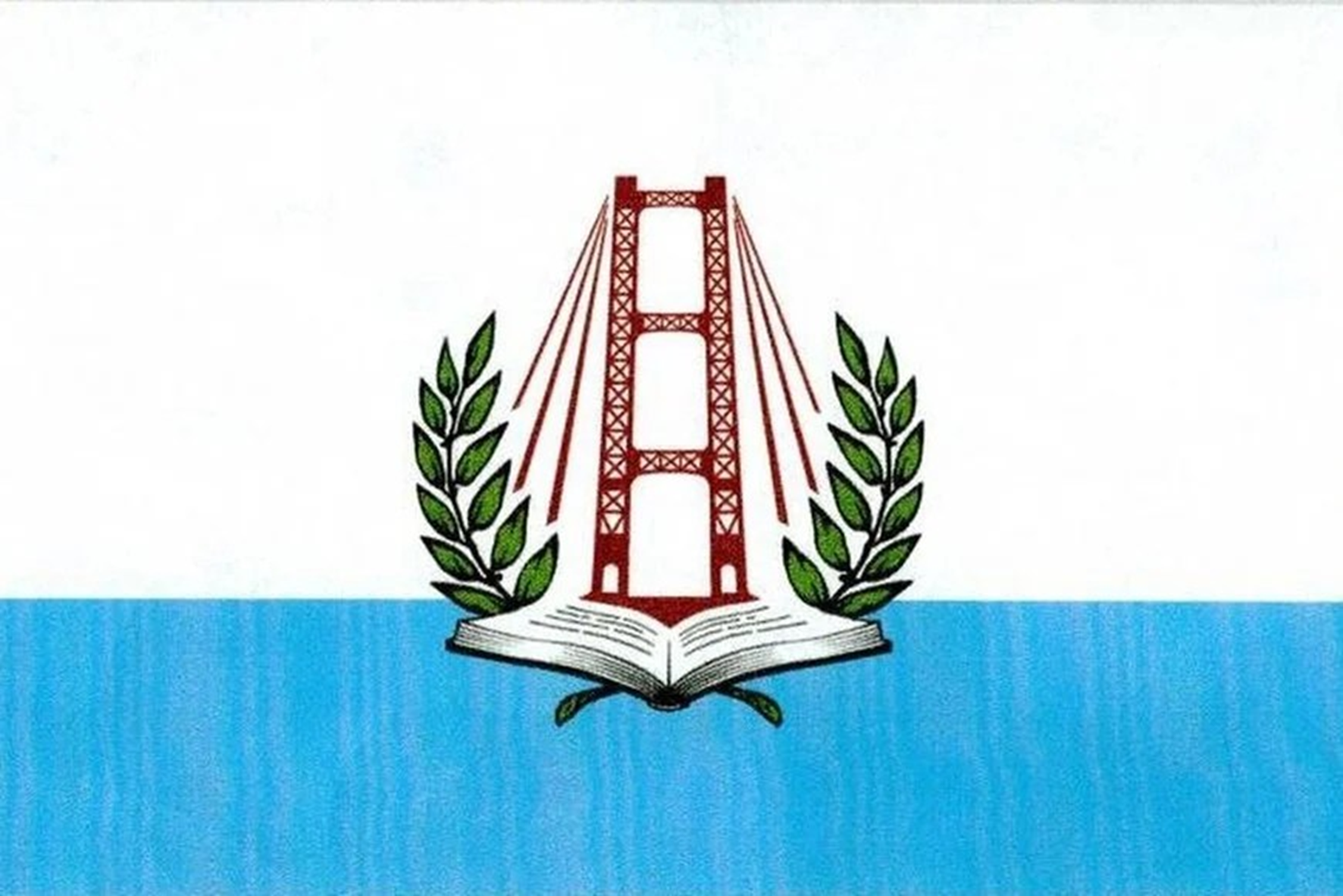
- Flag Coat of arms

- Location of Santa Fe in Argentina Santa Fe de la Vera Cruz (Santa Fe Province)
- Coordinates: 31°38′S 60°42′W
- Country: Argentina
- Province: Santa Fe
- Department: La Capital
- Founded: 1573

Government
  - Intendant: Juan Pablo Poletti (Partido Socialista)

Area
  - City: 748 km^{2} (289 sq mi)
- Elevation: 25 m (82 ft)

Population (2018 census)
  - Urban: 423,212
  - Metro: 653,073
- Demonym: Santafesino/a
- Time zone: UTC−3 (ART)
- CPA base: S3000
- Dialing code: +54 342
- Website: santafeciudad.gov.ar

Santa Fe de la Vera Cruz (Spanish pronunciation: [ˈsanta ˈfe ðe la ˈβeɾa ˈkɾus], lit. 'Holy Faith of the True Cross'), usually called just Santa Fe, is the capital city of the province of Santa Fe, Argentina. It is situated in north-eastern Argentina, near the junction of the Paraná and Salado rivers. It lies 15 kilometres (9.3 mi) from the Hernandarias Subfluvial Tunnel that connects it to the city of Paraná. The city is also connected by canal with the port of Colastiné on the Paraná River. Santa Fe de la Vera Cruz has about 423,212 people per the 2018 census [INDEC]. The metropolitan area has a population of 653,073, making it the eighth largest in Argentina.

Santa Fe de la Vera Cruz is linked to Rosario (170 km (106 mi) to the south), the largest city in the province, by the Brigadier Estanislao López Highway and by National Route 11, which continues south towards Buenos Aires. Córdoba is about (340 km (211 mi) west of Santa Fe, through the National Route 19. Santa Fe is home to the Sauce Viejo Airport with daily direct flights to Rosario and Aeroparque Jorge Newbery in Buenos Aires.

== History ==
Santa Fe de la Vera Cruz was founded on the nearby site of Cayastá in 1573 by the conquistador Juan de Garay (1528–1583) during an expedition which he led from Asunción (in present-day Paraguay) to the Paraná River. (Cayastá today has a historical park containing the grave of Hernandarias (1561–1634), the first American-born governor in South America.) The settlement was moved to the present site in 1653 due to the constant flooding of the Cayastá River. The city of Santa Fe became the provincial capital in 1814, when the territory of the province of Santa Fe was separated from the province of Buenos Aires by the National Constituent Assembly, held in the city in 1853.

Santa Fe de la Vera Cruz became the commercial and transportation center for a rich agricultural area that produces grain, vegetable oils, and meats. The city is the site of the National Technological University – Santa Fe Regional Faculty, Catholic University of Santa Fe (inaugurated in 1959), and the National University of the Littoral (first founded as the Provincial University in 1889, it adopted its current name in 1919).

A suspension bridge was completed in 1924, though severe flooding partially destroyed it in 1983 (a second bridge, the Oroño, was opened in 1971). The city's location is still not immune to flooding. On April 29, 2003, the Salado, which empties into the Paraná near Santa Fe, rose almost 2 m (6.5 ft) in a few hours following heavy rainfall, and caused a catastrophic flood. No fewer than 100,000 people had to be evacuated, and large sections of the city remained under water more than a week later. That year, the suspension bridge was reopened, and in 2008, the city's historic grain silos were converted into the Los Silos Hotel and Casino, and San Martín Street was converted to pedestrian use.

The city's historical role in the Argentine Constitution led national lawmakers to choose it as the site of Constitutional Conventions in 1949, 1957, and 1994.

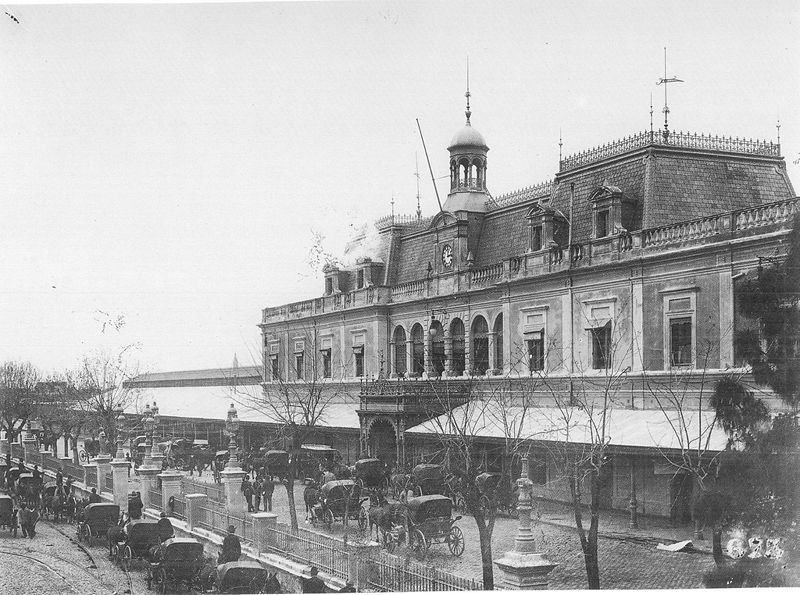
Santa Fe rail station (1905), today the long-distance bus station

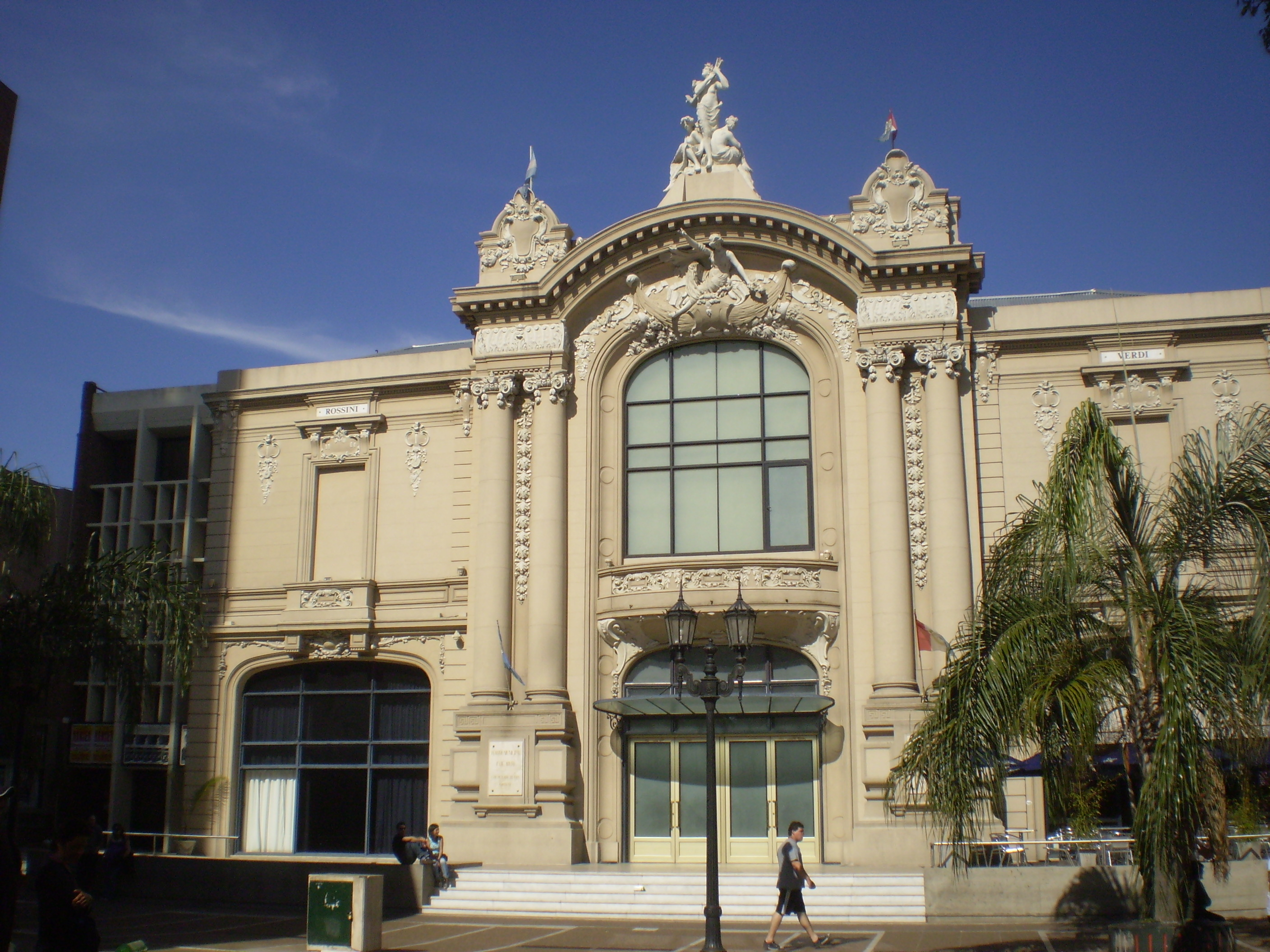
Municipal Theater

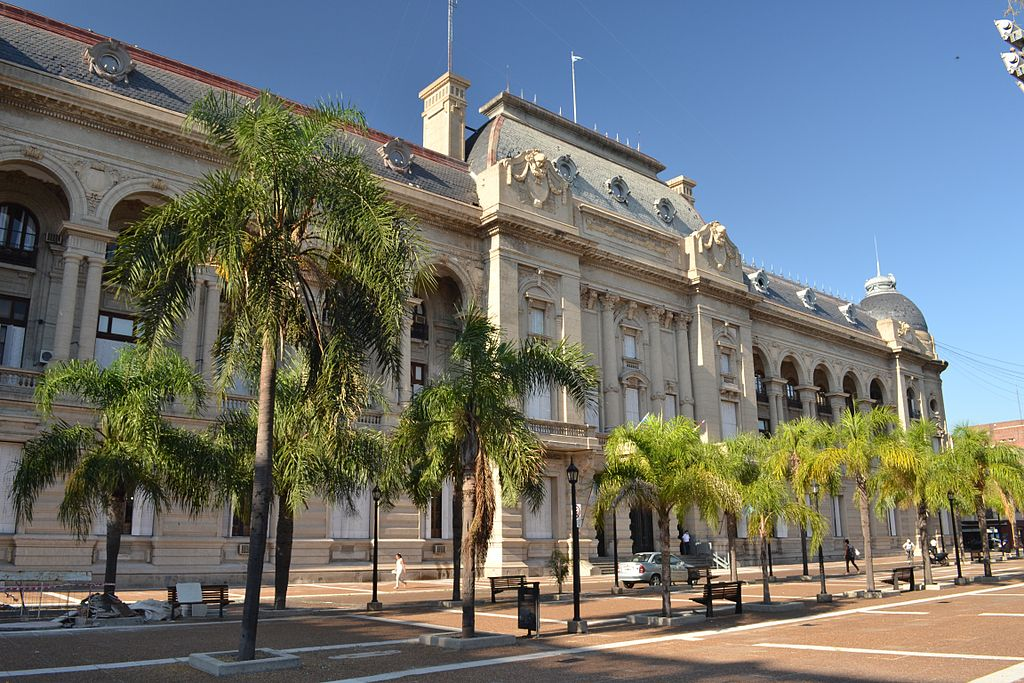
Santa Fe Province Government House Building

== Climate ==
The city has a climate considered as humid subtropical (Cfa, according to the Köppen climate classification, with a Cwa tendency). Winters are generally mild, though minimum temperatures can fall below 0 °C (32.0 °F) on cold nights during the winter. Summers are generally hot and humid. During the most extreme heat waves, temperatures have exceeded 45 °C (113.0 °F). Temperatures have exceeded 35 °C (95.0 °F) in every season.

Rainfall can be expected throughout the year though summer is usually the wettest season. Thunderstorms can be intense with frequent lightning, powerful downdraughts and intense precipitation. The lowest record temperature was −7.0 °C (19.4 °F) on June 13, 1967, while the highest recorded temperature was 45.6 °C (114.1 °F) on January 25, 1986.

Climate data for Santa Fe, SF (Sauce Viejo Airport) 1991–2020, extremes 1961–present
Month	Jan	Feb	Mar	Apr	May	Jun	Jul	Aug	Sep	Oct	Nov	Dec	Year
Record high °C (°F)	45.6 (114.1)	40.9 (105.6)	38.6 (101.5)	36.5 (97.7)	34.3 (93.7)	30.9 (87.6)	33.6 (92.5)	38.6 (101.5)	40.7 (105.3)	41.0 (105.8)	44.0 (111.2)	42.9 (109.2)	45.6 (114.1)
Mean daily maximum °C (°F)	31.5 (88.7)	30.0 (86.0)	28.5 (83.3)	24.6 (76.3)	21.0 (69.8)	18.0 (64.4)	17.5 (63.5)	20.3 (68.5)	22.5 (72.5)	25.2 (77.4)	28.0 (82.4)	30.2 (86.4)	24.8 (76.6)
Daily mean °C (°F)	25.7 (78.3)	24.4 (75.9)	22.6 (72.7)	18.9 (66.0)	15.5 (59.9)	12.4 (54.3)	11.5 (52.7)	13.8 (56.8)	16.3 (61.3)	19.4 (66.9)	22.2 (72.0)	24.4 (75.9)	18.9 (66.0)
Mean daily minimum °C (°F)	20.1 (68.2)	19.1 (66.4)	17.6 (63.7)	14.0 (57.2)	11.0 (51.8)	7.9 (46.2)	6.7 (44.1)	8.3 (46.9)	10.6 (51.1)	14.0 (57.2)	16.5 (61.7)	18.7 (65.7)	13.7 (56.7)
Record low °C (°F)	7.2 (45.0)	6.2 (43.2)	3.1 (37.6)	0.2 (32.4)	−5.0 (23.0)	−7.0 (19.4)	−6.6 (20.1)	−5.0 (23.0)	−2.9 (26.8)	0.2 (32.4)	3.9 (39.0)	5.6 (42.1)	−7.0 (19.4)
Average precipitation mm (inches)	98.7 (3.89)	117.5 (4.63)	138.4 (5.45)	127.9 (5.04)	52.1 (2.05)	33.3 (1.31)	25.4 (1.00)	32.2 (1.27)	49.4 (1.94)	114.8 (4.52)	143.0 (5.63)	143.1 (5.63)	1,075.8 (42.35)
Average precipitation days (≥ 0.1 mm)	7.0	7.3	7.1	8.0	5.0	3.5	3.2	3.5	5.4	7.9	7.7	8.3	73.9
Average relative humidity (%)	68.5	72.9	75.0	78.5	80.7	80.7	77.4	72.0	69.1	70.2	67.4	67.2	73.3
Mean monthly sunshine hours	288.3	240.1	241.8	195.0	176.7	150.0	179.8	210.8	210.0	235.6	267.0	266.6	2,661.7
Mean daily sunshine hours	9.3	8.5	7.8	6.5	5.7	5.0	5.8	6.8	7.0	7.6	8.9	8.6	7.3
Percentage possible sunshine	63	64	55	53	50	44	46	54	47	55	58	54	54
Source 1: Servicio Meteorológico Nacional
Source 2: UNLP (percent sun 1971–1980)

== The city ==
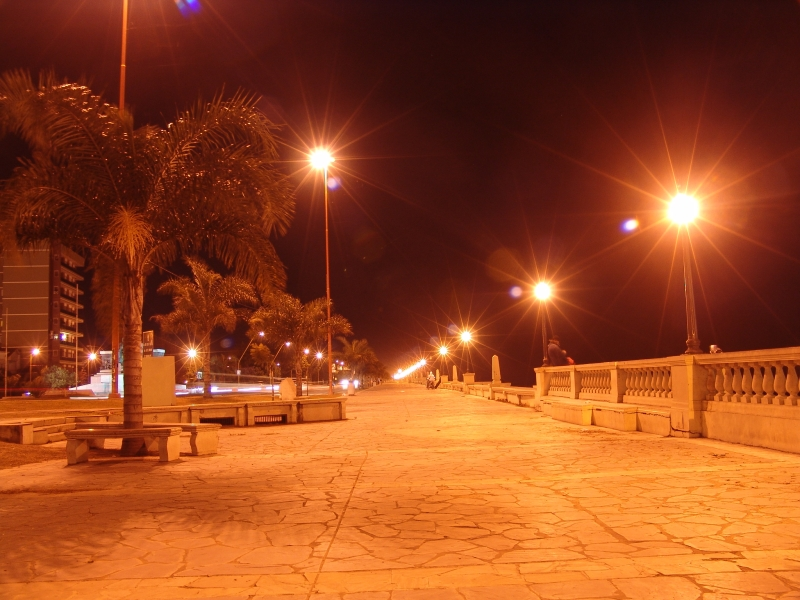
Santa Fe riverwalk

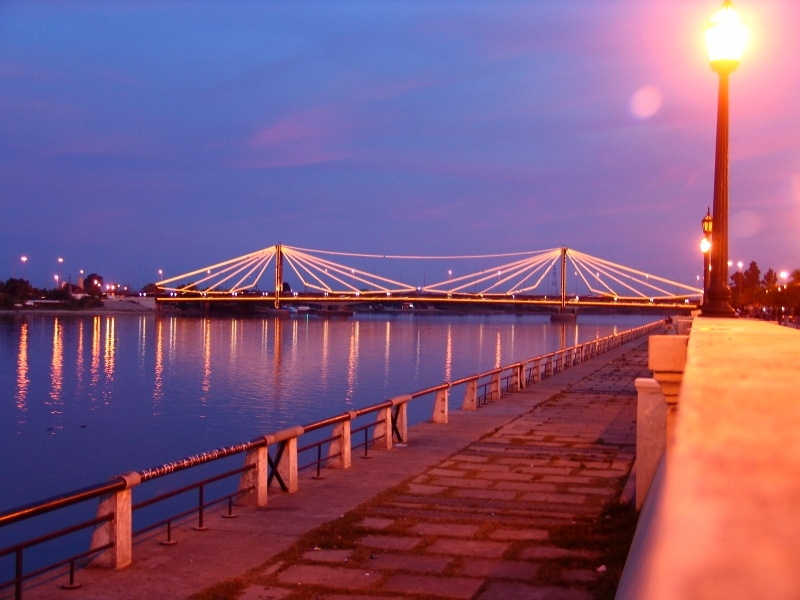
Puente Colgante

There is infrastructure for tourism that has been developed: river side bars and nightclubs, chic restaurants, the improvement of the major highways and a subfluvial tunnel.

== Transport ==
=== Railway ===
Despite having had four railway stations, nowadays the city Santa Fe is not served by rail transport. The Mitre Railway station is no longer used since 2007, when defunct company Trenes de Buenos Aires cancelled its services to Santa Fe. Likewise, the Santa Fe Belgrano (built in 1891 and named Cultural Heritage) and Guadalupe stations had been entered into disuse in 1993 when the railway privatisation in Argentina ceased all the long-distance services in the country.

In the 2010s, the local municipality remodeled both stations as Guadalupe would be terminus for a new urban train. Nevertheless, the original project was not carried out. On the other hand, the Santa Fe Belgrano station was re-opened as a convention center.

The fourth station (also the oldest of all) had been built by French company Province of Santa Fe Railway in 1885. It was demolished in 1962 and replaced by a bus station.

Railway stations in the city of Santa Fe are:

Name	Former company	Line	Status (passenger)
Santa Fe (Mitre)	BA & Rosario	Mitre	Closed (2007) (Note: No longer active since TBA cancelled its services.)
Santa Fe (Belgrano)	Central Northern	Belgrano	Closed (1993) (Note: Granted in concession to the Municipality of Santa Fe that remodelled it completely. The station re-opened as a convention center.)
Guadalupe	Central Northern	Belgrano	Closed (1993) (Note: Refurbished in 2011 by the Municipality to be terminus of an urban train. Nevertheless, the project was not carried out.)
Central Station	Prov. Santa Fe	Belgrano	Demolished (1962) (Note: Also known as "La Francesa", it was demolished in 1962 to build a bus station.)

== Sports ==
Santa Fe put itself on the international sports map as one of the host cities of the 1990 FIBA World Championship. The games were played in the Estadio de la Facultad Regional Santa Fe. The Estadio Ángel Malvicino was one of the venues of the 2002 FIVB Men's Volleyball World Championship. Santa Fe also hosted the first ever Five-pin billiards World Championship in 1965.

The city is also home to two first division football teams: Club Atlético Colón and Club Atlético Unión, who contest the Santa Fe derby. Santa Fe was also the place where the world known Amílcar Brusa was born and raised, and the home of boxers Carlos Baldomir and Julio César Vásquez.

== Notable natives ==
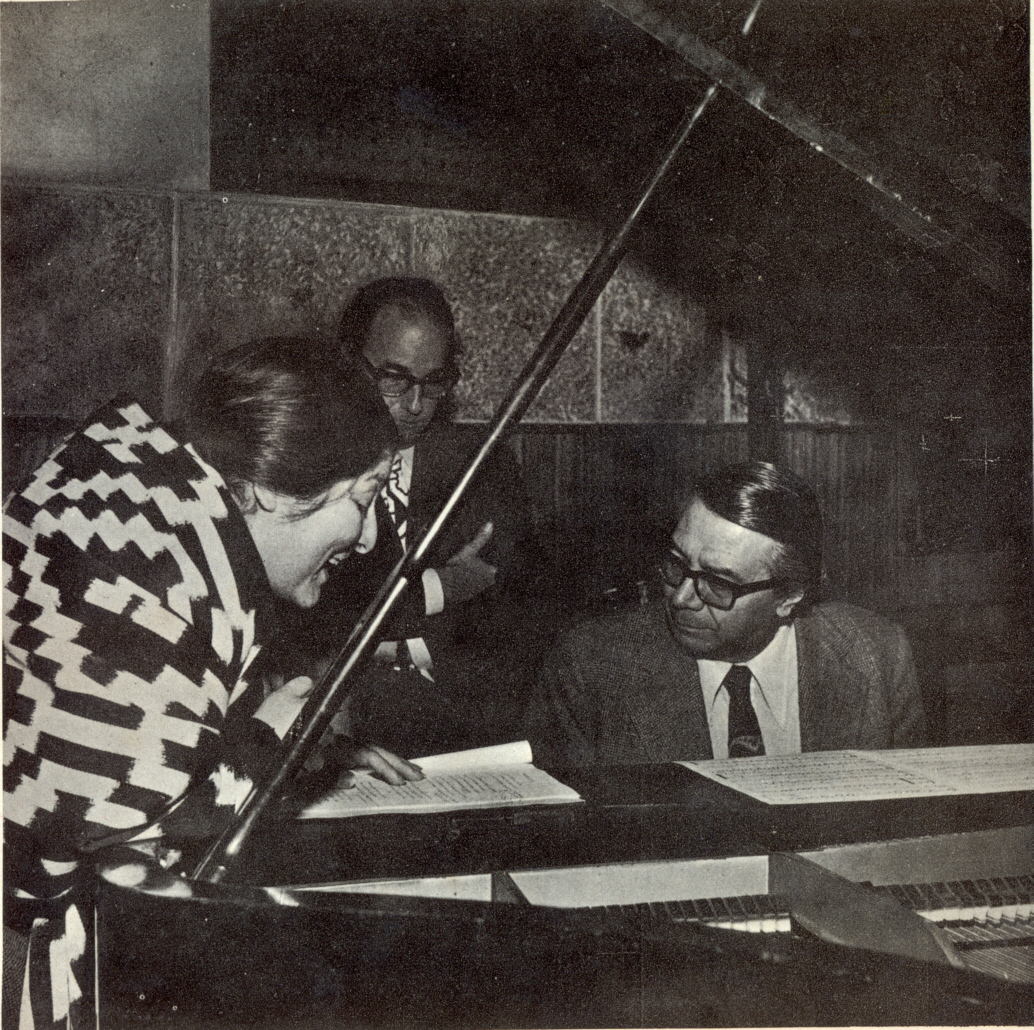
Composer and ethnologist Ariel Ramírez (at the piano) with Mercedes Sosa, 1972.

- Sebastián Caballero, football player
- Estanislao López, past Governor
- Carlos Thompson, actor
- Diego Bustos, journalist
- Norman Briski, actor and director
- Marcos Mundstock, actor and humorist
- Ariel Ramírez, musician and composer
- Ricardo Supisiche, artist
- Reine Flachot, cellist
- Liliana Bodoc, writer
- Osvaldo Bayer, writer
- Sergio Rubin, journalist
- Francisco Urondo, poet, writer and playwright
- Fernando Birri, film maker
- Carlos Baldomir, boxer
- Julio César Vásquez, boxer
- Carlos Delfino, basketball player
- Tayavek Gallizzi, basketball player
- Carlos Guastavino, pianist, composer
- Luciano De Cecco, volleyball player
- Victoria Mayer, volleyball player
- Germán Chiaraviglio, pole vaulter
- Arturo Kenny, polo player
- Rubén Rézola, sprint canoeist
- Santiago Grassi, swimmer
- Amelia Fournel, sport shooter
- Mario Schujovitzky, football player
- Enrique García, football player
- Alejandra Ironici, activist
- René Pontoni, football player
- Leopoldo Luque, football player
- Pedro Pablo Pasculli, football player
- Sebastián Battaglia, football player
- Juan Antonio Pizzi, football player, manager
- Carlos Reutemann, formula one driver and governor
- Alberto Armando, businessman and football manager
- Jorge Faurie, Diplomat, Minister of Foreign Affairs
- Rogelio Pfirter, Diplomat
- Dominga Lucía Molina, activist

== Sister cities ==
Santa Fe is twinned with:

- Santa Fe Springs, United States (1960)
- Ypacaraí, Paraguay (1978)
- Cuneo, Italy
- Montevideo, Uruguay
- Afula, Israel

== Gallery ==
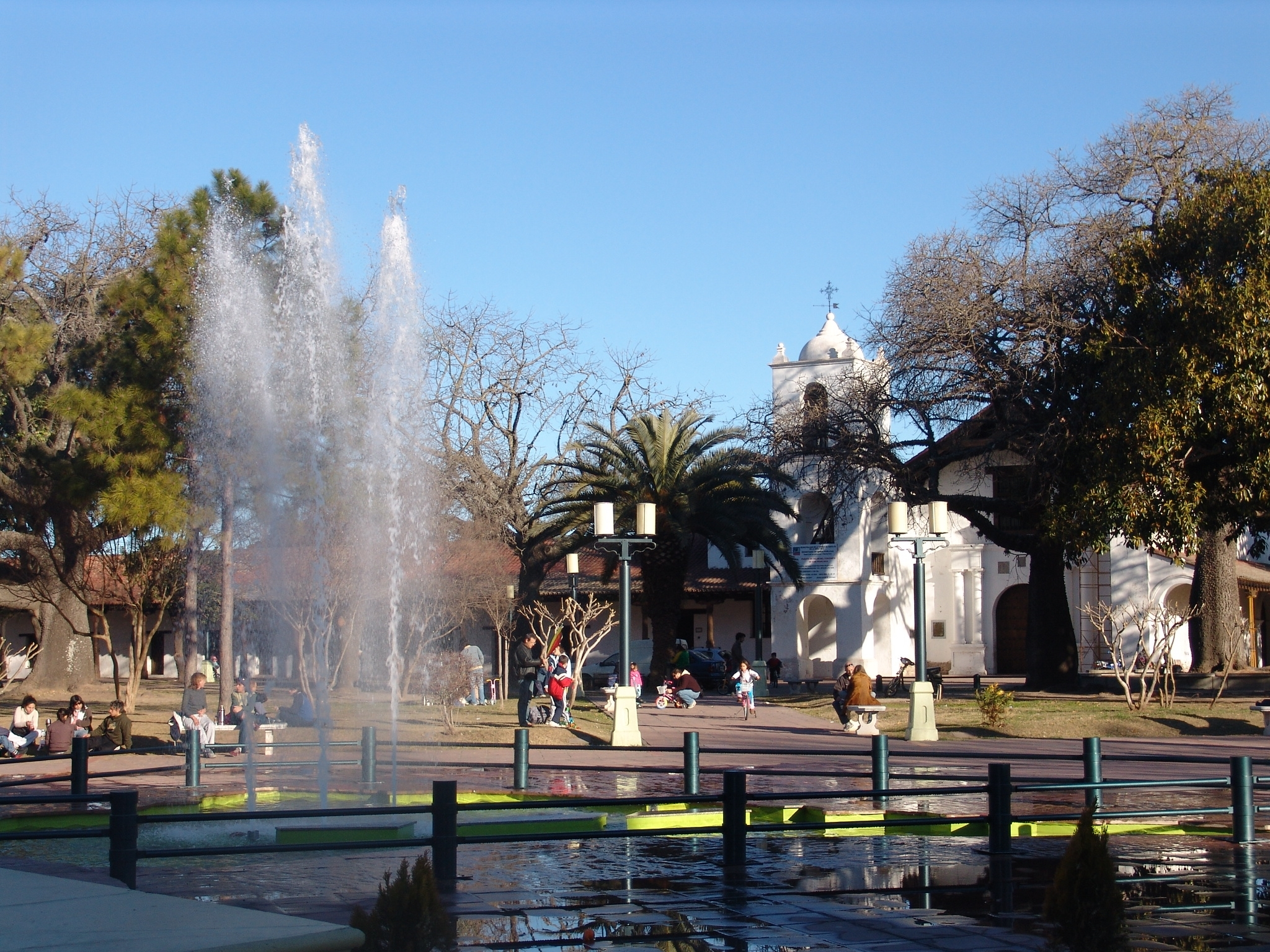
Paseo de las tres culturas

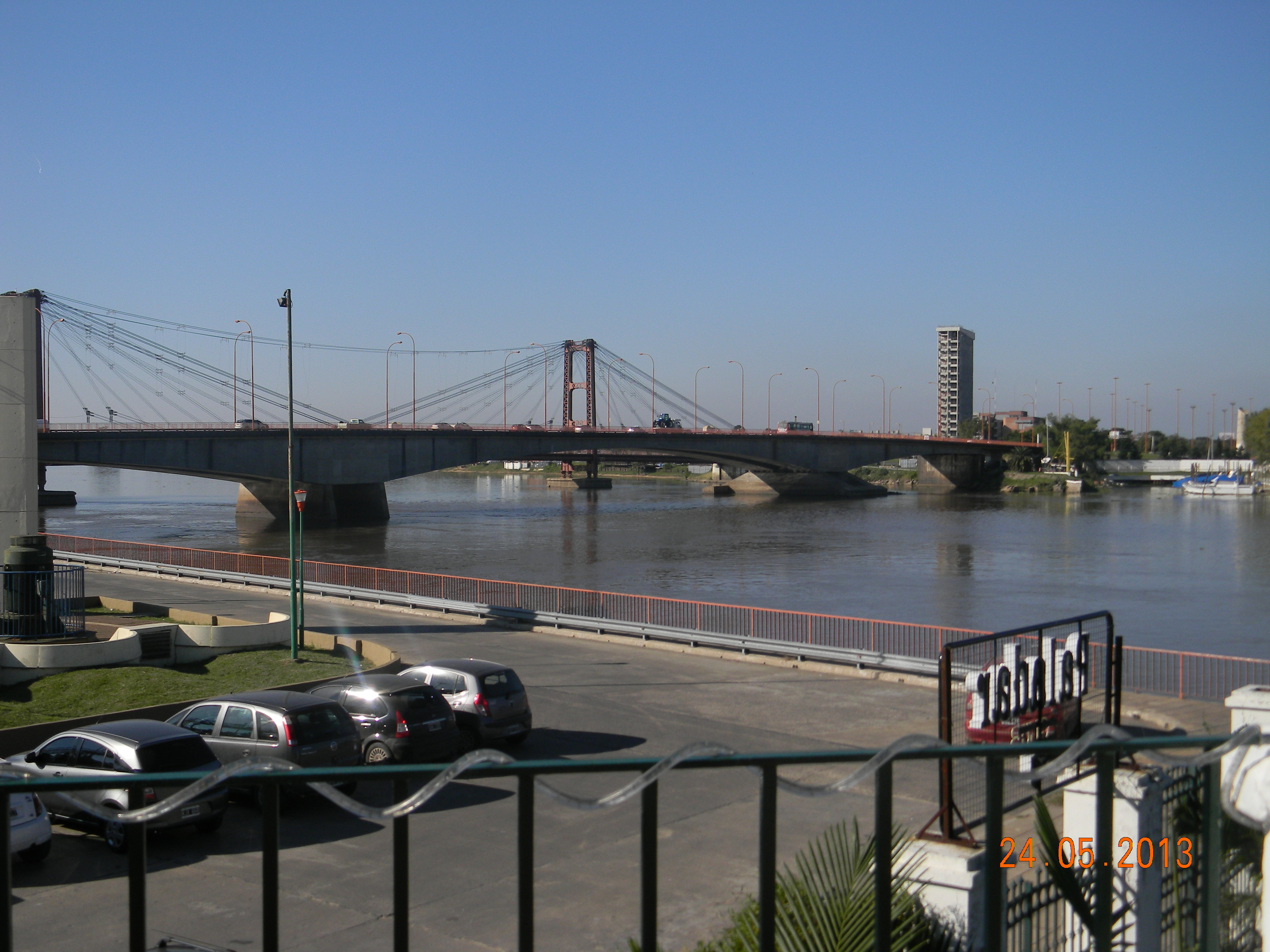
Santa Fe Carretero Bridge

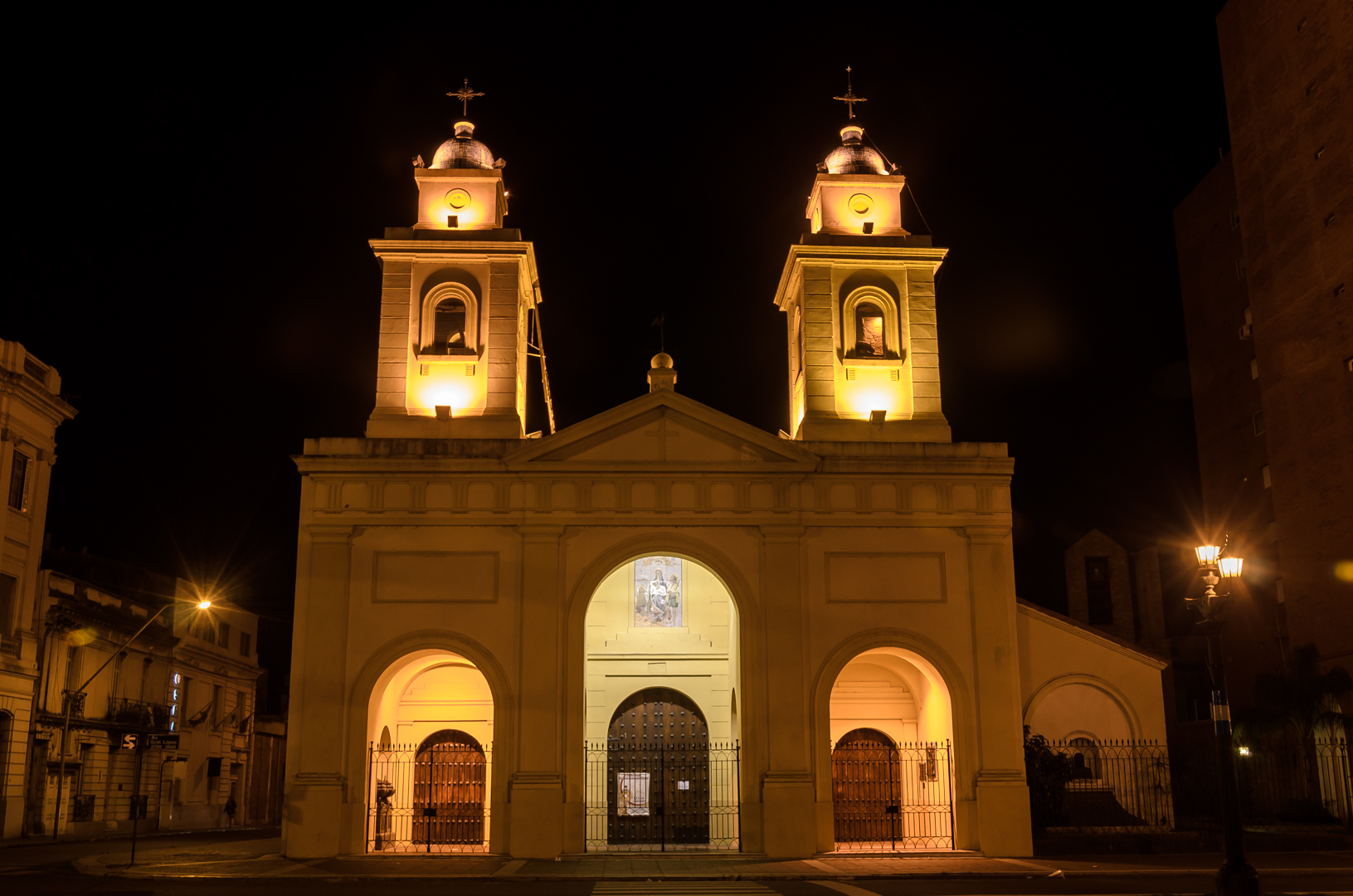
Santa Fe Cathedral

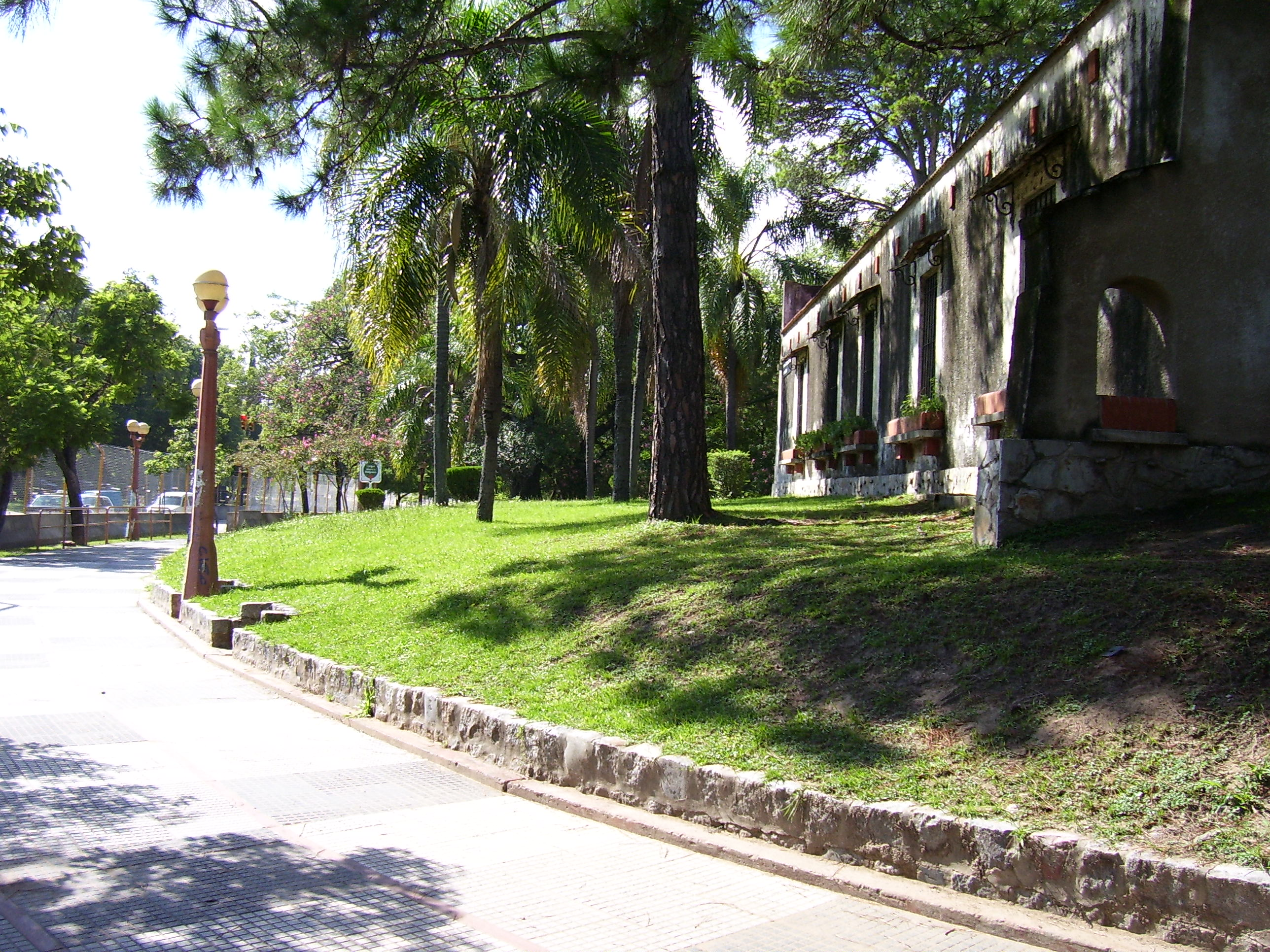
Sur Park, Santa Fe

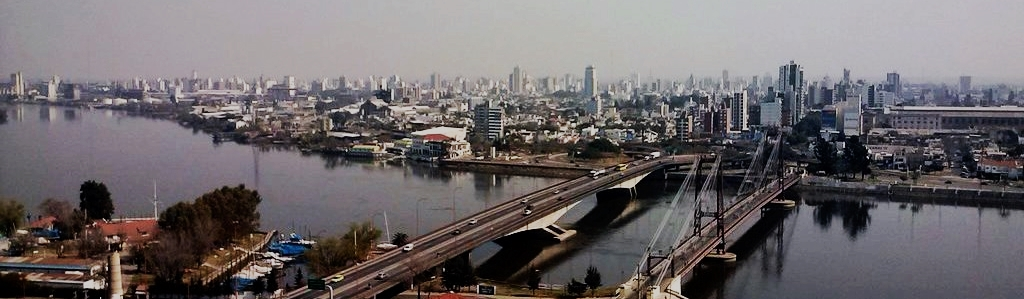
Santa Fe City's Skyline

== See also ==
- Category:People from Santa Fe, Argentina
- Argentine Littoral
- Paraná–Paraguay Waterway
- Paraná River steamers
