= Central Northern Railway =

Former railway in Argentine (1876–1948)

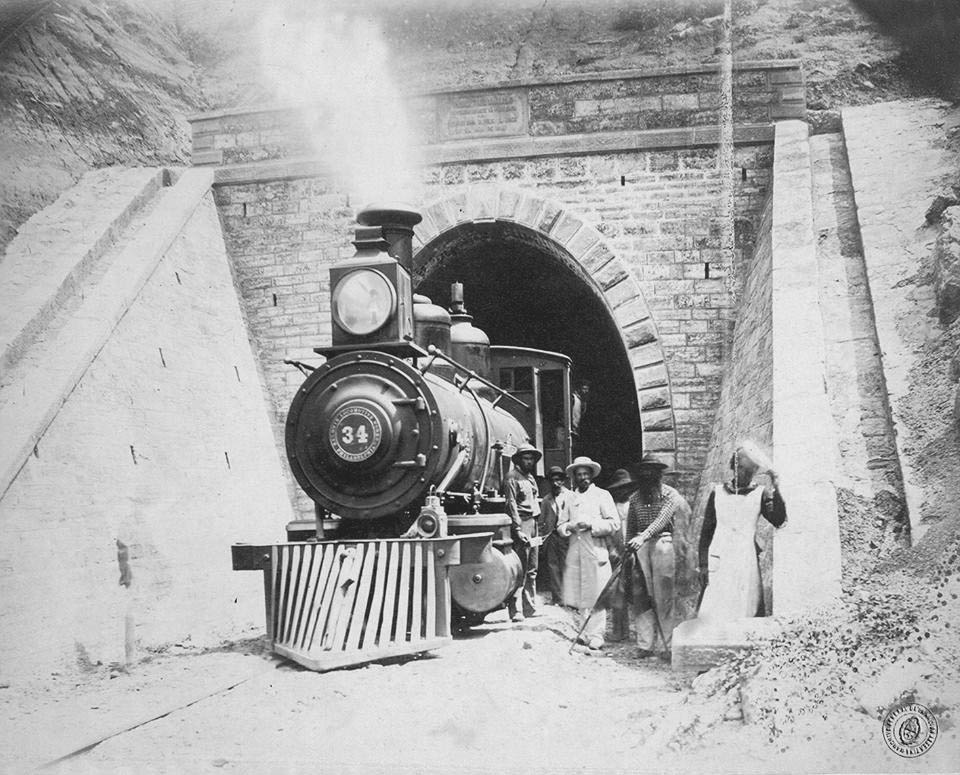
- Train and workers at the tunnel of "El Saladillo" viaduct, Tucumán Province.

Overview
- Native name: Ferrocarril Central Norte
- Status: Defunct company; some lines active
- Owner: Argentine State Railway (1909-48)
- Locale: Argentina
- Termini: Córdoba; Jujuy
- Stations: Tucumán; Formosa; Chaco; Santiago del Estero; Salta

Service
- Type: Inter-city

History
- Opened: 1876
- Closed: 1948; 77 years ago

Technical
- Track length: 7,500 km (4,700 mi)
- Track gauge: 1,000 mm (3 ft 3 3/8 in)
Route map
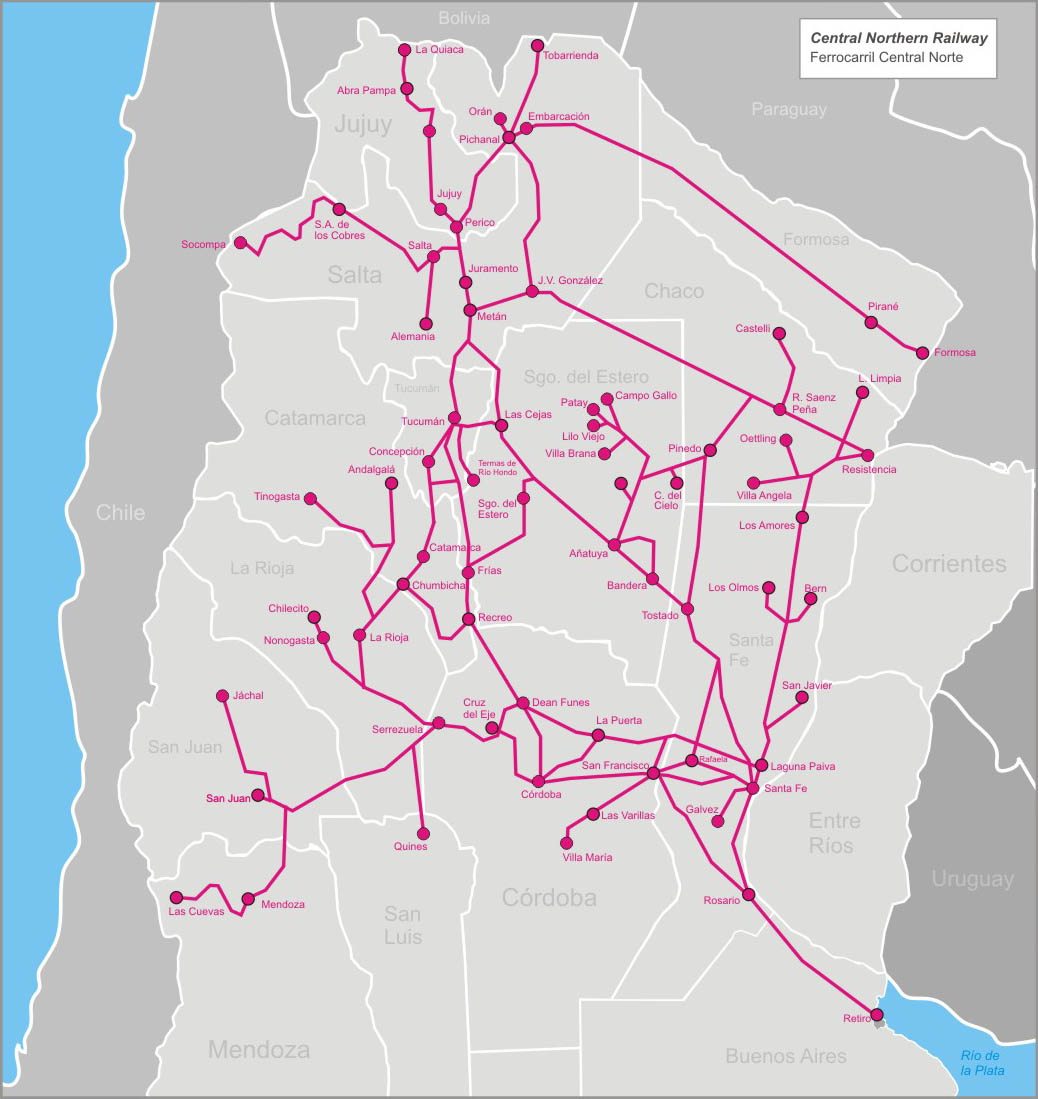

The Central Northern Railway (Spanish: Ferrocarril Central Norte, FCCN) was the first 1,000 mm (3 ft 3 3/8 in) (metre gauge) railway built by the Argentine State Railway. Its aim was to extend the existing British-owned Central Argentine 5 ft 6 in (1,676 mm) broad gauge railway from Córdoba to Tucuman and metre gauge was chosen for economic reasons.

== History ==
=== Origins ===
A law promulgated in October 1868 allocated funds obtained from additional taxes on imports and exports to the construction of a railway line between the Provinces of Córdoba and Jujuy. The construction and subsequent operation of the line was entrusted to "Compañía Telfner", who began to work on the line in 1873, reaching the city of Recreo (Catamarca) on 1 May 1875, San Antonio, Jujuy in July that same year and finally reaching San Miguel de Tucumán on 30 October 1876, being formally inaugurated by then President of Argentina, Nicolás Avellaneda.

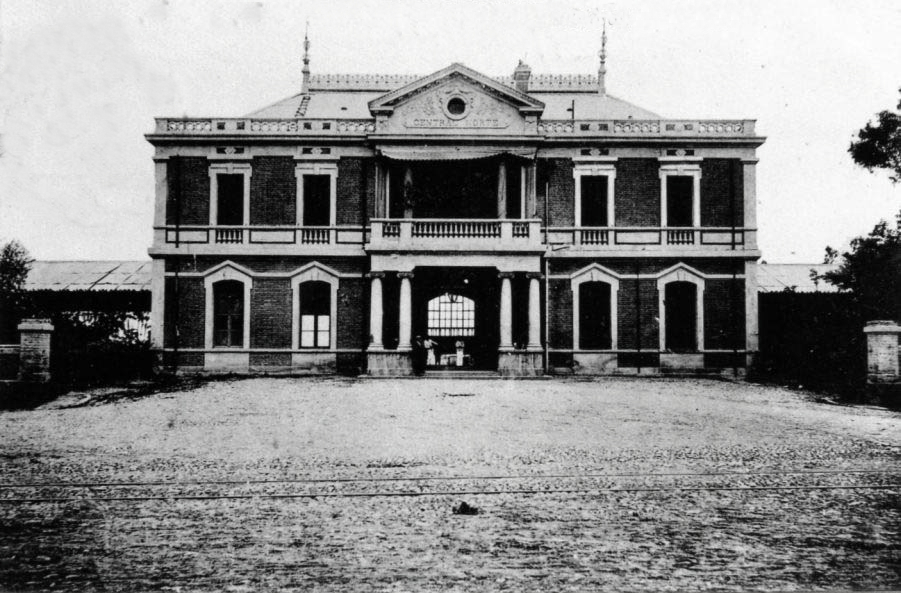
The Tucumán station building, pictured c. 1910

"I left this city sixteen years ago, with some books under my arm, travellin on a ox-drawn carriage. Today I returned for the first time, on a steam locomotive train, being your President (...) The locomotive, after having running hundred of miles, has entered to the promised land at last. (...) This locomotive represents industry, commerce, art, science, poetry, men's driver and city dweller".

— Nicolás Avellaneda in the inauguration of the CNR in Tucumán, 30 October 1876

On 28 December 1876 the national government took over the running of the line and appointed Rafaél Aranda as General Manager of the FCCN. The line was the longest in South America with 547 km.

A branch line from Frías to the city of Santiago del Estero was opened on 23 August 1884, and one from Recreo to Chumbicha (both in Catamarca Province) was opened on 17 February 1886. Construction of the line north from Tucumán towards Salta and Jujuy reached Vipos on 1 April 1885, later that year in June the section from Ruiz de los Llanos to Juramento was completed and in March 1888 the section Vipos to Ruiz de los Llanos was opened.

On 28 October 1887 the line from Alta Córdoba to Tucumán, together with the branch lines from Frías to Santiago del Estero, and from Recreo to Chumbicha, 884 km of track in total, were sold to the British-owned Córdoba Central Railway. This left the FCCN with only the 226 km section from Tucumán to Juramento which was then extended to Güemes and from there branch lines were completed to Salta and Jujuy by 1891.

=== Expansion continues ===
The Central Northern only owned the Tucumán - Juramento section (226 km length). The line continued expanding to North, first reaching Güemes with branches to Salta and Jujuy on January 31, 1891. On 14 January 1896 the State bought the French-owned Ferrocarril de San Cristóbal a Tucumán (that had been inaugurated 4 years before by the "Compañía Francesa de Ferrocarriles") and changed its name to "Ferrocarril Central Norte" Sección Sud whilst the line from Tucumán to Salta and Jujuy became known as "Ferrocarril Central Norte - Sección Norte". The acquisition included Colombres - Guzmán and Pacará - Río Salí branches.

The company opened the Salta - Zuviría branch on October 8, 1898. Two years later Pacará - Finca Elisa branch in Santiago del Estero Province was opened. In August 1901 the Finca Elisa - El Bracho line was opened in Tucumán Province. The FCCN also began to build a branch from Embarcación (Salta) to Perico (Jujuy), reaching Ledesma in 1904 and its extension to Yuto in 1909.

The section from Zubiría to Talapampa on the line from Salta to Alemania was opened on 18 August 1906 and the section from Jujuy to Humahuaca on the line to La Quiaca on the border with Bolivia was opened later that year on 2 September and was extended to La Quiaca on 25 May 1908.

The first section of the line to Chile via Socompa from Empalme Cerrillos to Rosario de Lerma was completed on 27 August 1907. The section from Finca Elisa to El Bracho in Tucumán Province was opened in August 1901. In Santiago del Estero Province branch lines were opened from Empalme Añatuya to Tintina on 11 October 1904, from Clodomira to La Banda on 2 March 1906 and from Puna to Santa Justina on 27 August 1907. On 17 January 1908 the section from Santa Fe to San Cristobal was opened and on 16 September 1909 the section from Las Cejas to Antilla was completed.

The line from Bracho to Palá Palá was opened on 6 December 1909 and extended to Leales on 20 June 1915. In 1911 the service between Bandera and Los Juríes was opened and in 1912 between Quilmili to Gancedo and extended to Puerto Vilelas and to Tintina and Campo Gallo in 1914. The line from Rapelli to Betbeder was opened on 15 April 1915, from Naré a San Javier on 30 June 1915 and from Empalme Añatuya to Los Linares on 28 September 1916. The section from Formosa to Kilometre 100 was opened on 22 September 1910 and extended to Las Lomitas on 20 July 1915. The line from Yuto to Embarcación was opened on 28 November 1911 and Embarcación and Las Lomitas were finally joined in 1931, thereby establishing a rail link across Formosa Province between the city of Formosa and the cities of Salta and Jujuy. The branch line from Pichanal to Orán was opened on 30 June 1915 and another from Empalme Metán to El Tunal was opened on 21 December 1916. The section between Talapampa and Alemania was opened on 7 October 1919.

=== Final years ===
On 11 October 1909 the rail network built by the state-owned company Ferrocarril Argentino del Norte was taken over by the CNR. A branch line between Cebollar and Andalgalá was added on 27 April 1910 and a section from Empalme Sarrezuela to San Juan was opened on 7 August of the same year thereby providing a rail link between Córdoba and San Juan. A branch line from Dean Funes to Laguna Paiva was completed on 21 December 1912.

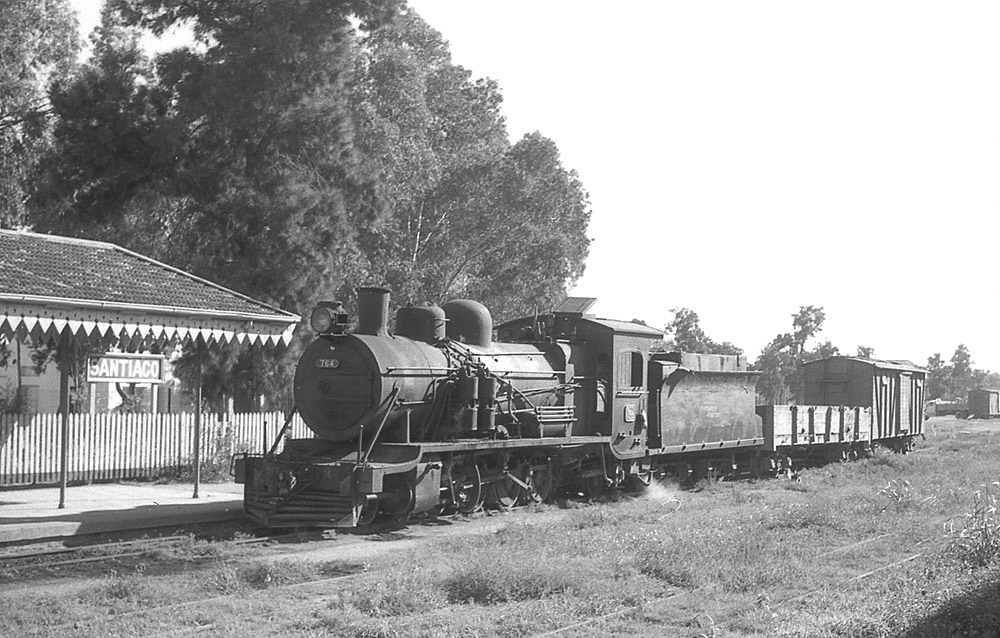
Steam locomotive at Santiago del Estero station, 1975

Branch from La Puerta to Alta Córdoba (120 km) was opened in 1931. During those years more than 112 km of tracks were built. The Argentine State Railway opened 1,027 km else, consisting on the following lines: Costado - General Pinedo (Chaco, 214 km), Joaquín V. González - Pichinal (Salta, 219 km), Milagro - Quines (San Luis, 139 km), Roque S. Peña - Campo del Cielo (Chaco, 100 km), Lorenzo Winter - Gral. Conesa (Río Negro, 108 km), Pedro Vargas - Malargüe (Mendoza, 186 km).

After the World War I Juan Quijano encouraged the creation of a 0,750 mm railway for forest and agricultural commerce in the North of Argentina. The line was built by the Argentine State for the "Compañía Ganadera y Forestal". It was named "ramal El Zapallar" with a junction in Lapachito on the Resistencia - Jujuy line. The company bought some Henschel & Son locomotives for the line, that had an extension of 75 km. This line would be taken over by the Argentine State Railway in 1944. In 1938, the Córdoba Central Railway (with some financial problems) was taken over by the Argentine state, being added to the FCCN network.

When the entire Argentine railway network was nationalised in 1948, during Juan Peron's presidency, the CNR became part of the state-owned company General Belgrano Railway.

== See also ==
- Argentine State Railway
- General Belgrano Railway
