= Ferrocarril de San Cristóbal a Tucumán =

Former French railway companyn in Argentina

San Cristóbal to Tucumán Railway
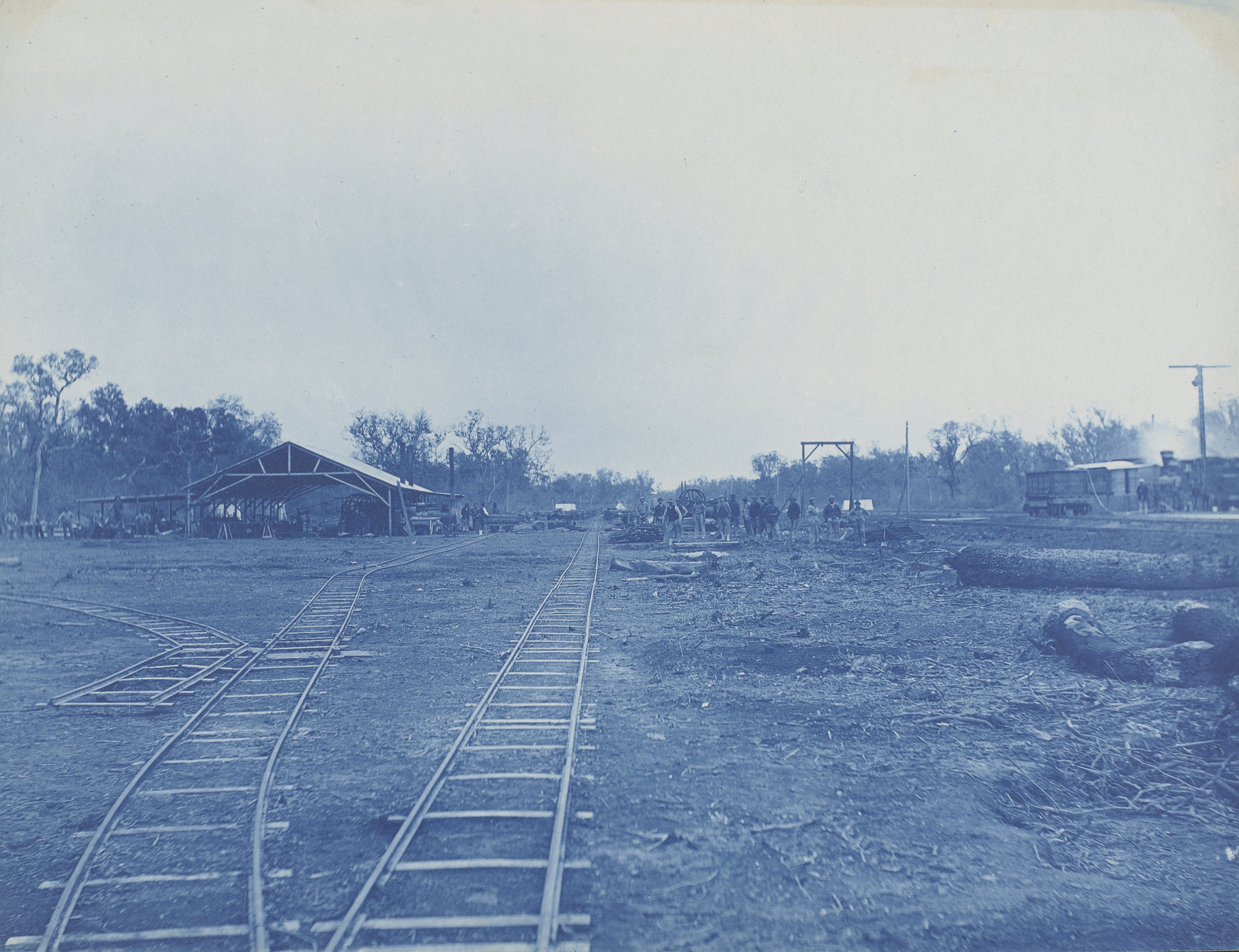
- Ferrocarril de San Cristóbal a Tucumán

Overview
- Native name: Ferrocarril San Cristóbal a Tucumán
- Status: Defunct company; rail line active
- Locale: Santa Fe, Tucumán
- Termini: San Cristóbal; S.M. de Tucumán

Service
- Type: Inter-city

History
- Opened: 1891
- Closed: 1896; 129 years ago (acquired by Central Northern Railway)

Technical
- Track gauge: 1,000 mm (3 ft 3 3/8 in)
Route map
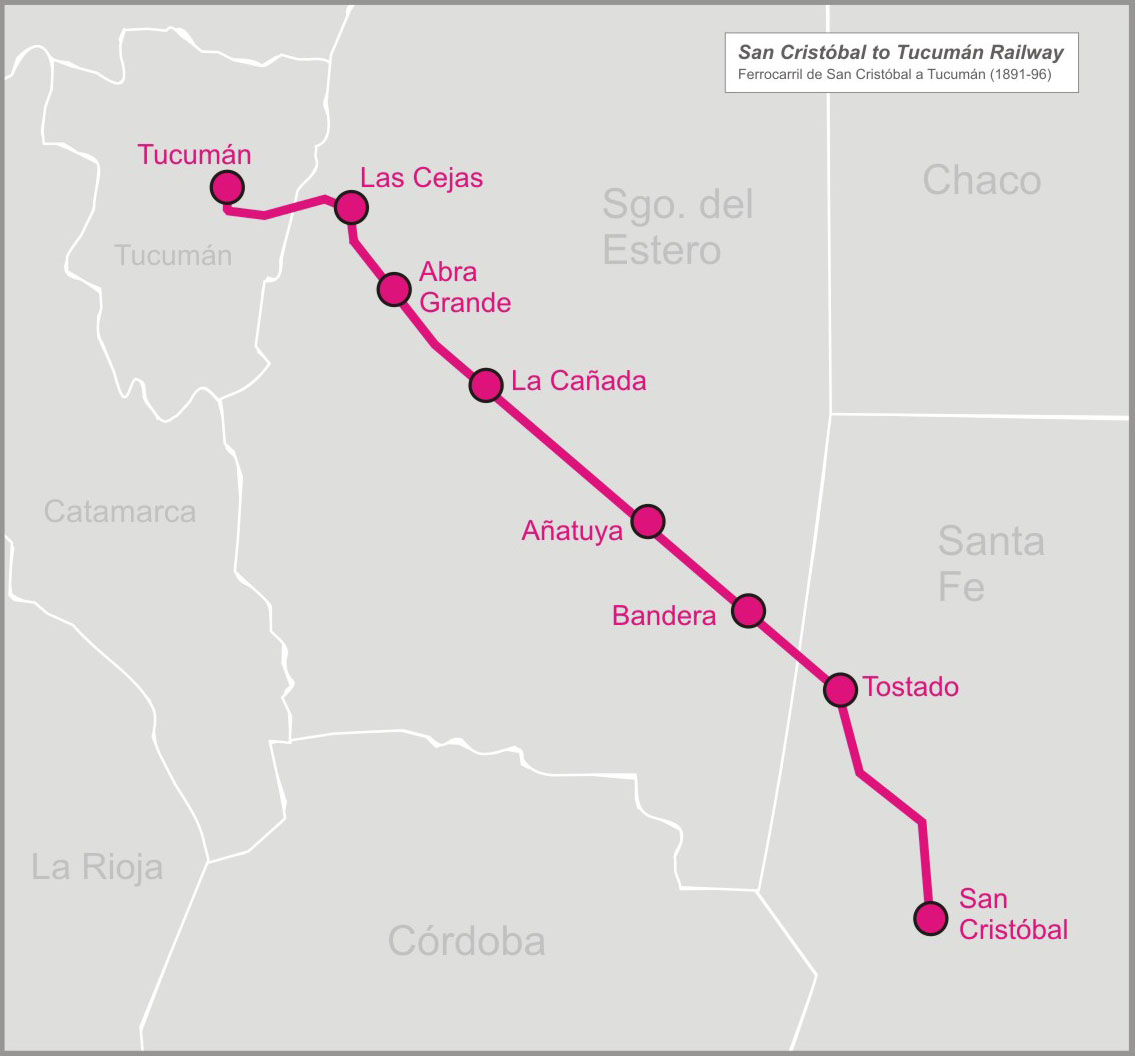

The San Cristóbal to Tucumán Railway (in Spanish: Ferrocarril San Cristóbal a Tucumán) was a French-owned railway company founded in 1888 which built a 1,000 mm (3 ft 3 3/8 in) metre gauge railway from San Cristóbal to Tucumán in Argentina.

== History ==
Originally granted in concession to Portalis frères, Charbonnier & Co. on October 21, 1887, it was transferred to Fives-Lille company one year later and transferred again to "Compagnie française des Chemins de Fer en Argentine" (colloquially known as La Francesa) in July 1889, which finally built the rail line.

The section from San Cristóbal in Santa Fe Province to Fortín Inca, just over the border in Santiago del Estero Province, was opened on 27 April 1891. From there construction continued across the province and into neighbouring Tucumán Province where San Miguel de Tucumán, the provincial capital, was reached on 6 July 1892. A 13-km branch line from Colombres to Guzmán and another from Pacará to Rio Salí were opened later the same year.

In 1896 the company was bought by the state and became part of Central Northern Railway.

== See also ==
- Central Northern Railway
- Belgrano Railway
