= Embarcación =

- Town
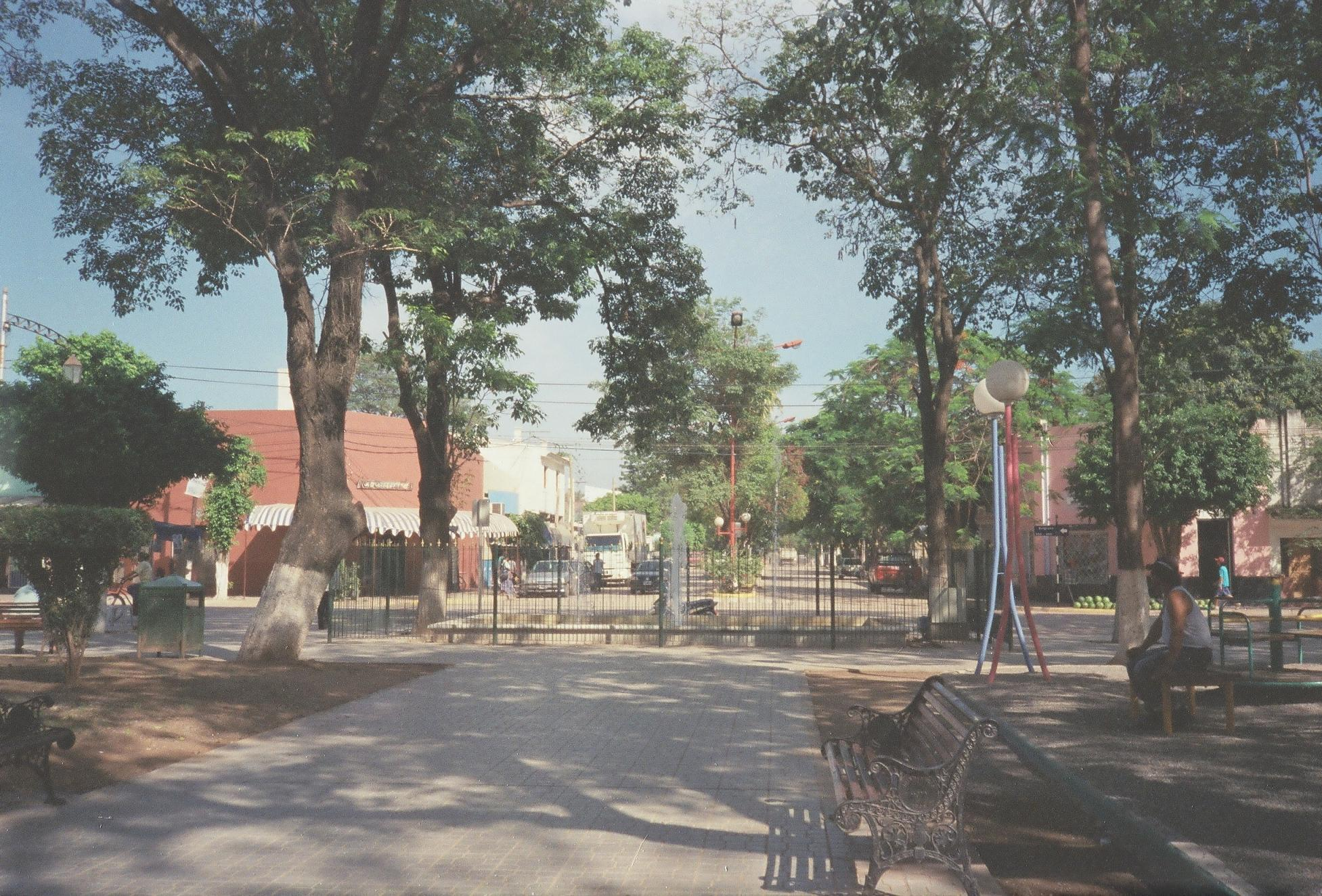
- Plaza de Embarcación

- Location in Argentina
- Coordinates: 23°13′S 64°06′W
- Country: Argentina
- Province: Salta
- Department: General José de San Martín
- Established: December 29, 1915

Government
  - Intendant: Carlos Hugo Funes

Area
  - Total: 1,470 sq mi (3,808 km^{2})
- Elevation: 896 ft (273 m)

Population (2001 census)
  - Total: 23,964
  - Density: 16.30/sq mi (6.293/km^{2})
- Time zone: UTC−3 (ART)
- Postal code: A 4550
- Area code: 03878
- Website: portaldesalta.gov.ar

Embarcación (Salta) is a town and municipality in Salta Province in northwestern Argentina.

== Overview ==
The area was originally inhabited by the Wichí, who hunted and fished along the Bermejo River. Jesuit missionaries established the first European outposts in the area, fostering commerce along the Bermejo's northern banks and in the vicinity of what later became Embarcación. The outpost was informally known by that name, meaning "harbour" due to its strategic location north of the confluence of the Bermejo and San Francisco Rivers. The site later belonged to Celedonia Reyes de Prado, who sold the land to a partnership between the Leach brothers and Dr. Carlos Serrey on July 12, 1909.

These partners parceled the land as 48 lots of roughly one hectare (2.5 acres) each. The arrival of the Central Northern Rail line on November 28, 1911, led to the rapid sale and development of the lots. Hitherto a subdivision of San Ramón de la Nueva Orán, the Municipality of Embarcación was established on December 29, 1915.

The town's civic offices and first school were inaugurated in 1917, and in 1929, the Provincial Bank of Salta opened a local branch. Adopting San Roque as the town's patron saint, Embarcación had a hospital inaugurated in his honor in 1938, and the Catholic Parish, built in the 1960s, is so named as well. The 1931 completion of the rail link to the city of Formosa led to its nickname of el Portal de Salta ("the Gateway to Salta").

The town became home to 13 schools and six radio stations, as well as Universal Video Cable, a local television station established in 1982. Though it developed a sizable commercial sector, horticulture and related activities remain the leading employers in Embarcación. Salvita, a local fruit and vegetable packaging and distribution firm, was established by Salvador Muñoz, and is the leading buyer for the area's growers. The largely agrarian town, where 70% of residents lived in substandard housing at the 2001 census, embarked on a significant public works agenda in 2010.
