= Talapampa =

Coordinates: 25°32′S 65°34′W

- Municipality and village
- Interactive map of Talapampa
- Country: Argentina
- Province: Salta Province
- Time zone: UTC−3 (ART)

Talapampa is a village and rural municipality in Salta Province in northwestern Argentina.
