= Sauce Viejo International Airport =

Airport in Argentina

Sauce Viejo International Airport Aeropuerto Internacional Sauce Viejo
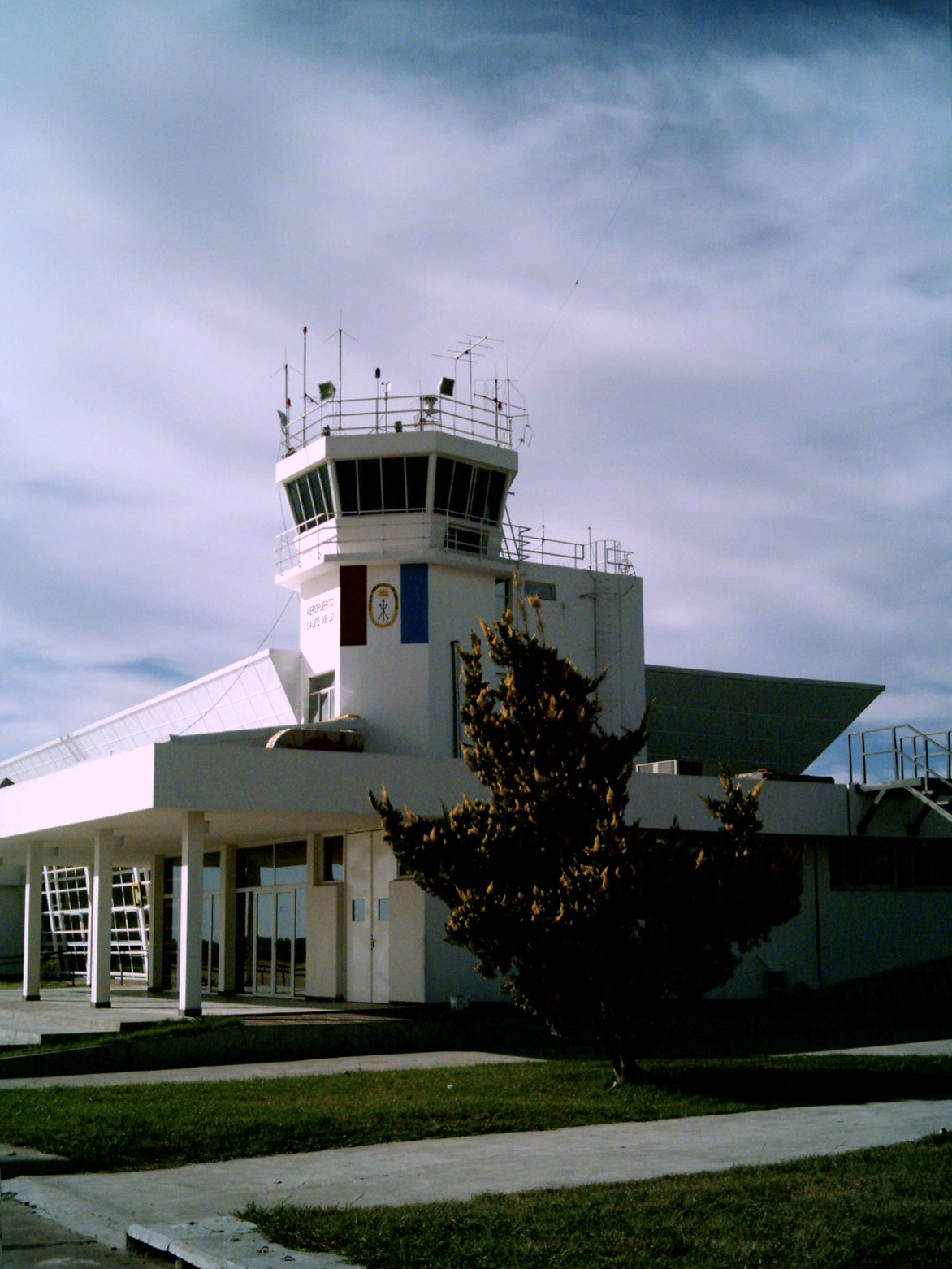
- IATA: SFN; ICAO: SAAV

Summary
- Airport type: Public
- Operator: Government of the Province of Santa Fe
- Serves: Santa Fe, Argentina
- Elevation AMSL: 59 ft (18 m)
- Coordinates: 31°42′40″S 60°48′40″W

Map
- Location of airport in Argentina

Runways
Direction	Length		Surface
Direction	m	ft	Surface
03/21	2,325	7,628	Asphalt

Statistics (2016)
- Total passengers: 65,039
- Source: WAD GCM Google Maps SkyVector

Sauce Viejo International Airport (Spanish: Aeropuerto Internacional de Santa Fe – Sauce Viejo) (IATA: SFN, ICAO: SAAV) is an international airport in Santa Fe Province, Argentina serving the city of Santa Fe. The airport is 10 kilometres (6 mi) southwest of Santa Fe.

The new airport was built in 2005. It has a 3,000 square metres (32,000 sq ft) terminal and parking space for 150 cars. The Sauce Viejo non-directional beacon (Ident: SVO) is located on the field.

== Description ==
The aerodrome is located 17 km southwest of the city of Santa Fe, alongside National Route 11 and the Rosario – Santa Fe Highway. It regularly operates domestic commercial flights to and from Aeroparque Buenos Aires, as well as private flights to various cities across the country. The airport was recently certified as an international airport.

Initially called Aeródromo Sauce Viejo, construction began in May 1954, with the main runway completed in December of that year and the terminal in June 1955. It was inaugurated on 9 December 1955, with Aerolíneas Argentinas flight 526, which connected Mendoza with Buenos Aires, making a stopover in Santa Fe. Years later, in 1975, the airport's only runway was expanded. At that time, seven weekly flights were scheduled, and there was the possibility of connections to Córdoba, Mendoza, and other destinations.

The passenger terminal covers an area of 3000 m^{2} and has separate entrances for arrivals and departures, facilitating passenger traffic. It has a total of 3 gates, all with direct access to the runway.

A building is under construction within the premises for the Fire Extinction Service (SEI), which will make it the first airport in Argentina to have its own fire station.

It has a Federal Security Force, the Airport Security Police, known as the Sauce Viejo Operational Unit. In 2021, as part of a provincial infrastructure plan launched by the Santa Fe government under Omar Perotti, a renovation of the airport terminal began.

== Airlines and destinations ==
Airlines	Destinations
Aerolíneas Argentinas	Buenos Aires–Aeroparque

== See also ==
- Transport in Argentina
- List of airports in Argentina
