= Rosario Sur Station =

Railway station in Rosario, Argentina

Coordinates: 33.0100°S 60.6497°W

Rosario Sur
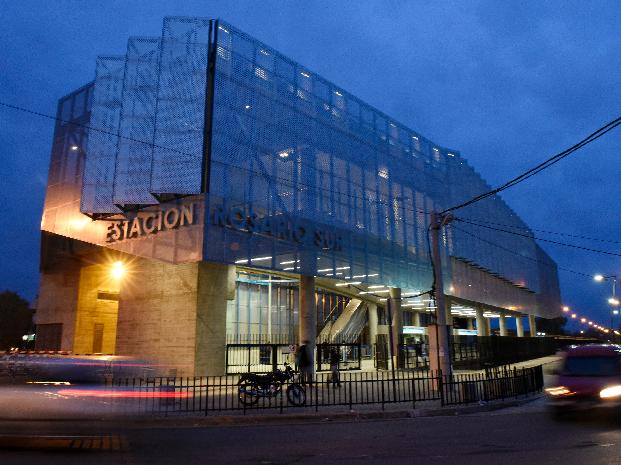
- Exterior view of the station, July 2015

General information
- Other names: Juan Carlos Groenewold
- Location: San Martín and Battle y Ordóñez, Rosario; Argentina
- System: Inter-city
- Owner: Government of Argentina
- Operator: Trenes Argentinos
- Line: Mitre

History
- Opened: 1981 (original station); 2015 (reopening)
Location

Rosario Sur is a railway station in Rosario, Santa Fe, Argentina. The station, part of the Mitre Railway line, originally built and opened in 1981.

The station (officially named "Juan Carlos Groenewold" to honor a railway manager) is located near the intersection of San Martín and Battle y Ordóñez Avenues, in the south of Rosario. Before its refurbishing and reopening in July 2015, the station was also referred as "Apeadero Sur".

== History ==
The station was inaugurated in December 1981 by de facto Intendent of Rosario, Alberto Natale, and operated by State-owned company Ferrocarriles Argentinos until the early 1990s, when the entire railway network was privatised during Carlos Menem's Presidency. After the process finished, Ferrocarriles Argentinos was dissolved and the station entered into disuse.

In February 2014 Rosario Sur was chosen to operate as terminus of a new passenger service to Rosario departing from Retiro and operated by State-owned Operadora Ferroviaria Sociedad del Estado ("Trenes Argentinos"). Rosario Sur building and platforms were completely rebuilt, replacing old 60-meter length platforms for new ones of 220-meter. Some homeless families that lived in the station were moved to other locations to finish works.

Services were reestablished on April 1, 2015, running brand-new trains acquired to China CNR Corporation to run express services exclusively, with a journey time of 6 1/2 hours. with the building still not finished.

Works were financed by the National and Provincial Governments, at a total cost of $ 80 million. A new station building was constructed, including a waiting room for 500 people, information and ticket sales offices, accessible toilettes, coffee houses, escalator and elevator. The railway platform were extended to 300 m (980 ft).

=== Operators ===
Company	Period
Ferrocarriles Argentinos	1981–1993
Trenes Argentinos (Note: Re-opened after refurbishment.)	2015–present
