= Buenos Aires and Rosario Railway =

Defunct railway company in Argentina

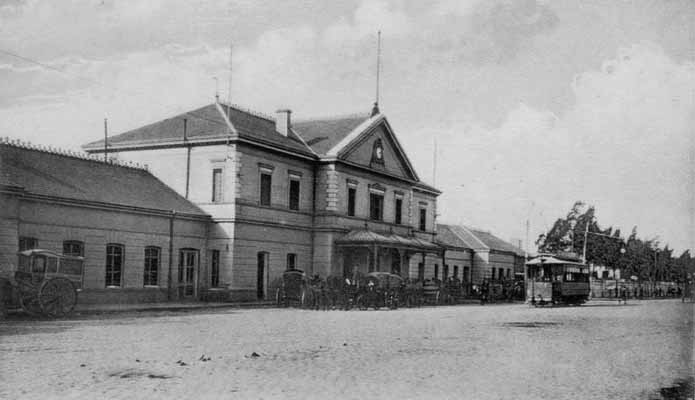
- Rosario Norte Station, terminus, c. 1900

Overview
- Native name: Ferrocarril Buenos Aires y Rosario
- Status: Company defunct; railway line active as Ferrocarril Mitre
- Termini: Buenos Aires (Estación Central) (1876–1897); Buenos Aires (Retiro BANR) (1897–1901) (Note: The BA&R had its terminus in BA&Ensenada's Estación Central until it was destroyed by fire in 1897. This caused the BA&R used the Retiro station owned by Buenos Aires Northern until 1901 when the BA&R inaugurated its own building (between the current Belgrano and San Martín stations). The BA&R would be later acquired by the Central Argentine Railway, which built a bigger terminal opened in 1915, Retiro Mitre railway station so the old building entered into disuse.); Buenos Aires (Retiro BA&R) (1901–1908); Tucumán
- Stations: Rosario (N); Santiago del Estero

Service
- Type: Regional rail

History
- Opened: 1876
- Closed: 1908; 118 years ago (Acquired by the Central Argentine)

Technical
- Track gauge: 5 ft 6 in (1,676 mm)
Route map
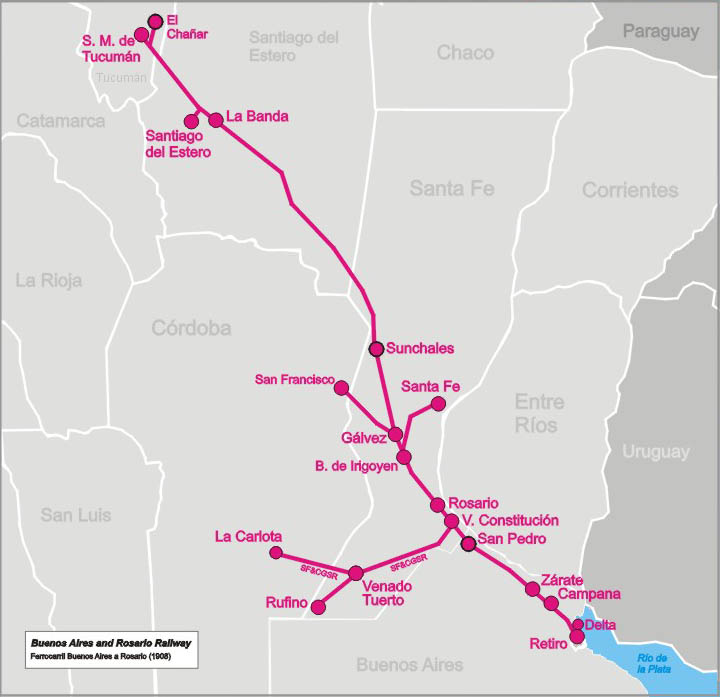

The Buenos Aires and Rosario Railway (BA&R) was a British-owned railway company that built and operated a 5 ft 6 in (1,676 mm) broad gauge railway network in Argentina, where it was known as the "Ferrocarril Buenos Aires y Rosario". Originally thought as a line from Buenos Aires to Campana, it then extended to the provinces of Santa Fe, Santiago del Estero, and Tucumán.

The BA&RR also took over the Santa Fe and Córdoba Railway in 1900. The company operated until 1908, when it was acquired by the Central Argentine Railway which took over its services.

== History ==
=== Preliminary projects ===
By the 1870s, people from Littoral zone that came to Buenos Aires by train, had to navigate on Sarmiento River to Tigre, where the Buenos Aires Northern Railway ("Ferrocarril del Norte de Buenos Aires") carried them to the centre of the city. Many times the river was not able to be navigated due to lower water levels, leaving passengers waiting for long periods of time.

Guillermo Matti conceived the idea to build a railway that connected Buenos Aires with Campana. In that city passengers could take a boat to Rosario and other cities of Argentine Littoral, saving a considerable navigation time. The new railway would compete with FCNBA.

Three different paths were proposed to build the railway line from Campana:

1. Line to the East: in Benavídez the path deviated to North East, joining FCN in San Fernando.
2. Direct line to Buenos Aires, without joints.
3. Line to the South, running near Capilla del Señor until Moreno where it joined Buenos Aires Western Railway.

The third path was finally chosen, therefore on September 10, 1870, the Government of Buenos Aires Province granted Guillermo Matti & Cía. the concession to build and commercialize a railway line from the Port of Campana to Moreno station. But on August 19, 1871, the path was modified through a Provincial Law that stated the line would join Western Railway in Recoleta. This contract was defined on October 6, 1871.

=== Construction ===
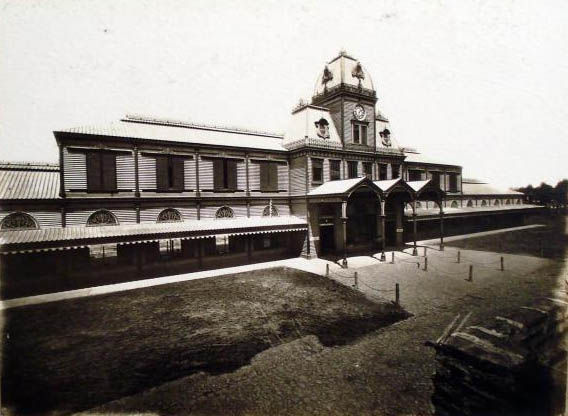
The Central Station of Buenos Aires was the original terminus of the BA&RR until 1897, when it was completely destroyed by fire

At the end of 1873, "the Buenos Aires and Campana Railway Company Limited" was established in London. On January 19, 1874, the recently formed company signed a contract stating that BA&R perceive a 7% of interest for 20 years.

Works began on October 11, 1872, beginning in the same terminus (Buenos Aires and Campana) simultaneously. Trains departed from Central Station running to Recoleta station on Buenos Aires Northern Railway's track. From Recoleta the train ran passing the stations of Belgrano, San Martín (where the company had built its workshops and depots), Villa Ballester. From then on, trains ran on about 40 km of wetlands, also crossed by several rivers, Las Conchas River among them. Those obstacles required to build many bridges and two viaducts, one over Las Conchas River and another over Luján River.

In April 1874 Matti formed the "Compañia del Ferrocarril a Campana" (in English: "Buenos Aires and Campana Railway").

=== Development ===
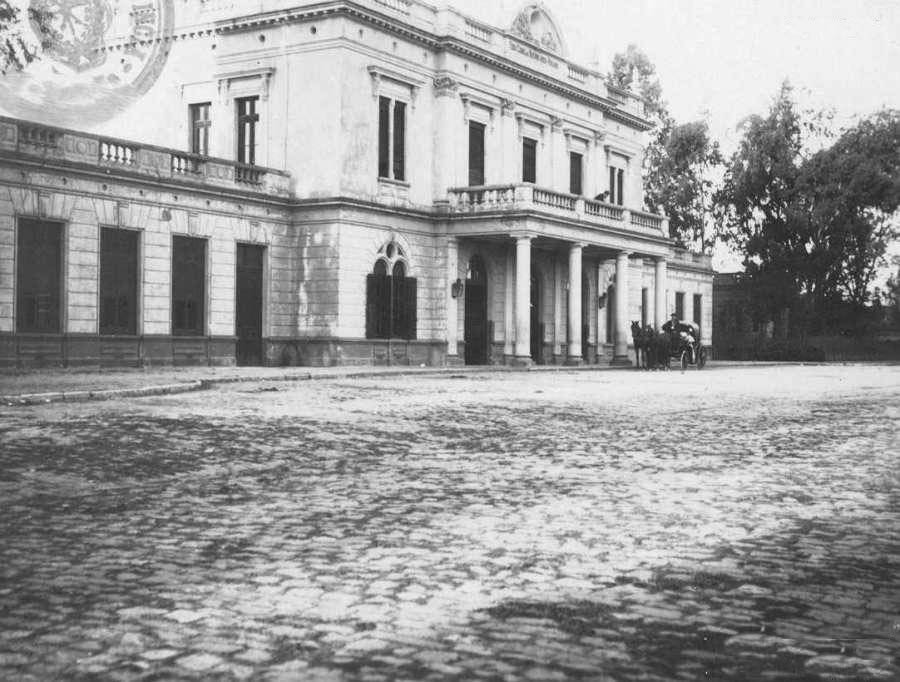
Santa Fe station c. 1900

On January 13, 1876, the line made its first journey from Central Station to Campana. Presidents of the railway companies involved in the project were part of the inaugural trip. The company ran a total of 4 services per day (2 forward and 2 return trains). Each trip took an average of three hours.

Due to the great success, the Buenos Aires and Campana Railway requested to extend its tracks from Campana to Rosario. This request was approved therefore the company transferred its shares to a recently formed company, named "Buenos Aires and Rosario Railway". The main track extended to Zárate, then to Baradero (1885), reaching Rosario at the end of 1885, setting terminus in Rosario Norte Station (formerly named "Sunchales", located on Aristóbulo del Valle and Ovidio Lagos Avenues). The first service to Rosario ran from Central Station of Buenos Aires on February 1, 1886.

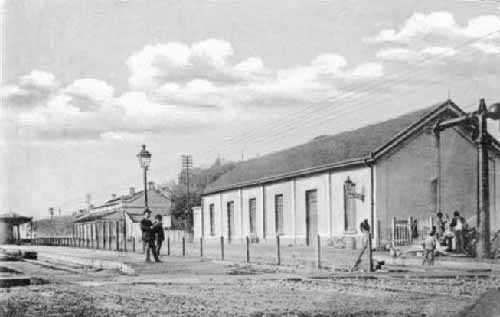
Belgrano R station, 1900

From this point on the rate of expansion of the company increased and from Rosario the line was extended to Gálvez (October 1886), Rafaela (March 1887), Sunchales (June 1887) (all cities of Santa Fe Province), La Banda (September 1890) and Tucumán (February 1891). Branch lines were built from San Lorenzo to Puerto San Martín and Puerto Cerana (1889), from Bernardo de Irigoyen to Santa Fe (1892), Gálvez to San Francisco (1890), from La Banda to Santiago del Estero (February 1891), and from Cevil Pozo to El Chañar (1896).

On 9 August 1890 the company acquired a 22 km line from Coghlan junction, on the main line, to Tigre, which put the company in direct competition with the Central Argentine Railway.

That made Buenos Aires connected with the rest of Argentina for the first time, through a railway that extended to Córdoba, Tucumán and Santiago del Estero provinces.

By the mid-1890s the BA&R was the second largest British-owned railway company in Argentina and was effectively challenging the Central Argentine's monopoly of the north-west of the country.

On 20 September 1900 the BA&R bought the 490 km metre gauge rail network built by the British-owned company Santa Fe and Córdoba Great Southern Railway (SF&CGS). The sale included a concession already granted to the SF&CGS for the extension of their network from La Carlota to Río Cuarto cities of Córdoba Province, which the BA&R opened on 26 March 1902.

=== Belgrano R - Tigre R ===
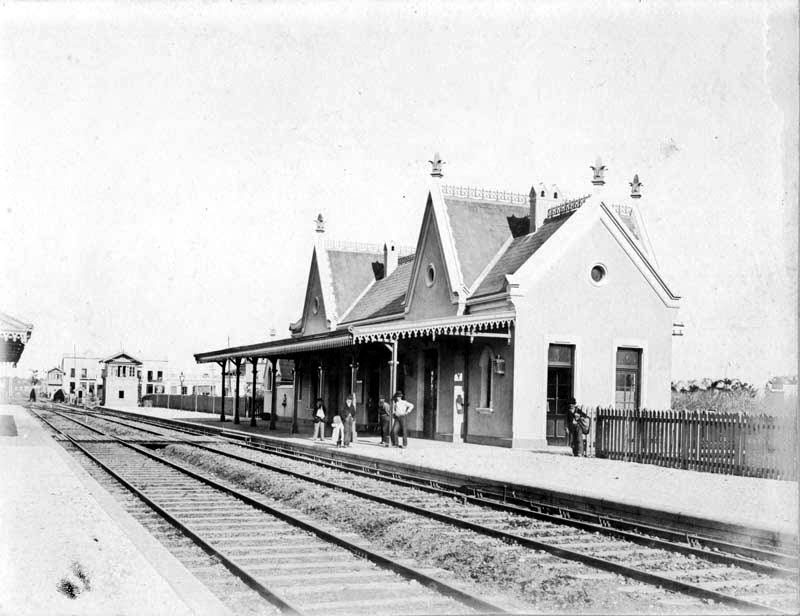
San Isidro R station, part of the line to Delta station in Tigre Partido

On October 8, 1887, President of Argentina Miguel Juárez Celman granted Emilio Noguier y Cía. the construction of a railway line from Belgrano to the city of Las Conchas (current Tigre) with the purpose of competing with FCN. The path would run parallel to FCN tracks, crossing the same towns. To finance the project, in 1888 Noguier established "Cía. Nacional de Ferrocarriles Pobladores", that acquired lands in places where the railway would be built.

In April 1889 works began until at the end of the year, the company suspended its activities due to lack of credits As a result, Emilio Noguier decided to sell the concession. Soon after, the BA&R acquired the line (22 km length). The company had projected a branch to Tigre, starting in Coghlan.

BA&R committed to build that branch, being the Coghlan station the first to be inaugurated. That was named to honor Irish engineer John Coghlan (1824-1890). The branch to Tigre, named Tren del Bajo, was constructed between 1891 and 1896. Sections finished were as follows:

| Section | Opened |
|---|---|
| Belgrano R – B. Mitre | Feb 1891 |
| B. Mitre – San Isidro R | Nov 1891 |
| San Isidro R – San Fernando R | Ago 1892 |
| San Fernando R – Canal San Fernando | Feb 1893 |
| Canal San Fernando – Tigre R | Jul 1896 |

The path ran in parallel to the FCN (that had been purchased by Central Argentine Railway), to difference homonymous stations, such as Belgrano, San Isidro, San Fernando and Tigre, the Central Argentine line added a "C" to the names, while the BA&R added a "R".

==== Closure and reaperture ====
In 1961, after the railway nationalisation, the Retiro-Tigre R branch was closed to Bartolomé Mitre station due to its low demand. In 1995, the abandoned part of Tigre R branch was reconverted as a light train named Tren de la Costa, including new stations (Avenida Maipú, Libertador, Marina Nueva and Delta), the last mentioned replaced the original Tigre R station.

=== Merge to Central Argentine ===
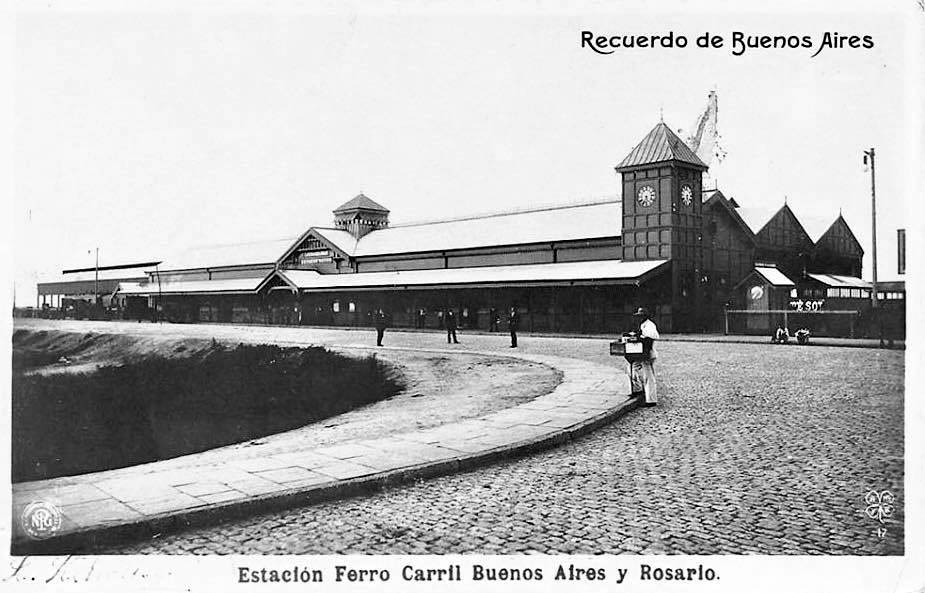
The Retiro station building inaugurated in 1901. When the Central Argentine opened its new terminus in 1915, the old building entered into disuse. It would be later demolished

The Central Argentine Railway was one of the oldest and main railway companies in Argentina, nevertheless, one of its objectives had always been to connect Buenos Aires with Rosario. It was in part achieved when CAR purchased FCN, although BA&R had been running services between both cities since 1886 with a short journey time. CAR and BA&R were conscious that fierce competition would affect both sides' interests.

For that reason, in 1908 CAR and BA&R merged into a unique company. The agreement stipulated that BA&R would take over services and CAR would liquidate its business, selling its assets. However, the President and Director of the recently formed company came from CAR. The name of the company was not defined either, so the locomotives showed the BAR ("Buenos Aires al Rosario") or FCCA ("Ferrocarril Central Argentino") on their sides. In 1909, it was decided that the company was named "Ferrocarril Central Argentino", considering it more appropriate than "Buenos Aires al Rosario" due to the line extended from Buenos Aires to Córdoba and Tucumán.

Therefore, the Central Argentino added BA&R's 2,000 km of rail lines, becoming one of the biggest railway companies of Argentina. It was also decided that Rosario Central station would be used for short and middle distance services and Rosario Norte would be terminus for long distance trains.

== Rolling stock ==
The BA&RR rolling stock consisted of 25 steam locomotives produced by British company Beyer, Peacock & Company to serve its lines. The first 10 units were delivered between 1885 and 1886 (numbered 19 to 28) while the remaining 15 locomotives were delivered in 1888 (numbered 35 to 49). Those machines were designed by engineer Hermann Lange, then co-manager of the company.

== Bibliography ==
- Bernasconi, Ariel (2012). Historia del Ferrocarril al Norte del Gran Buenos Aires: Ferrocarriles Mitre y Belgrano. Editorial Dunken. ISBN 978-9870257691.
- Lewis, Colin M. (1983). British Railways in Argentina 1857-1914: A Case Study of Foreign Investment. Athlone Press (for the Institute of Latin American Studies, University of London).
