= Buenos Aires Northern Railway =

Former British-owned rail company in Argentina (1857–1888)

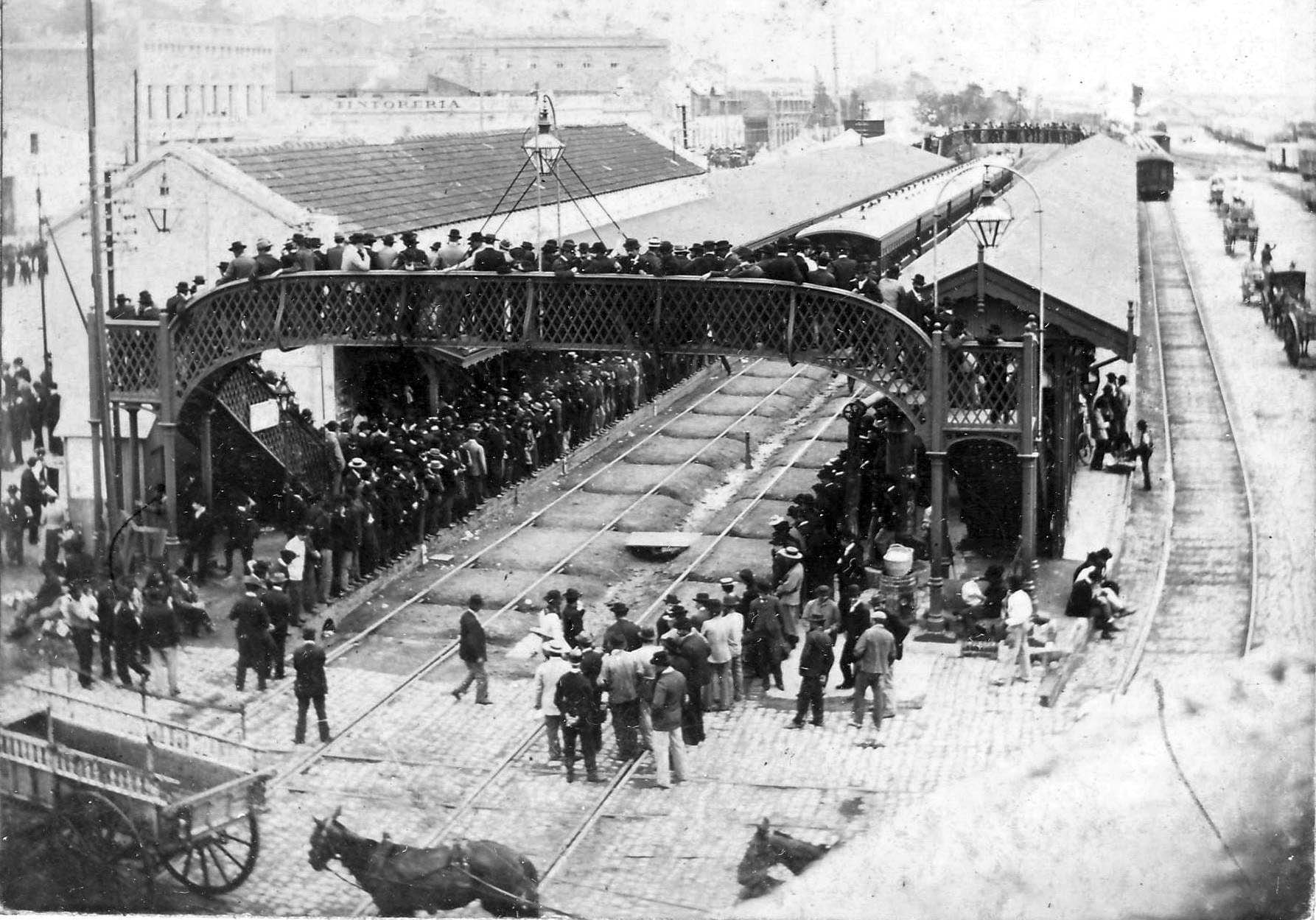
- The BANR's "Retiro" station (c. 1900), viewed from the south side

Overview
- Native name: Ferrocarril del Norte de Buenos Aires
- Status: Operational
- Termini: Buenos Aires (Retiro) (1862–1873, 1897–1915); Buenos Aires (Central Station) (1873–1897); Tigre
- Stations: 9

Service
- Type: Commuter rail
- Services: 1

History
- Opened: 1862
- Closed: 1888; 138 years ago (Acquired by Central Argentine)

Technical
- Line length: 30 km (19 mi)
- Track gauge: 5 ft 6 in (1,676 mm)
Route map
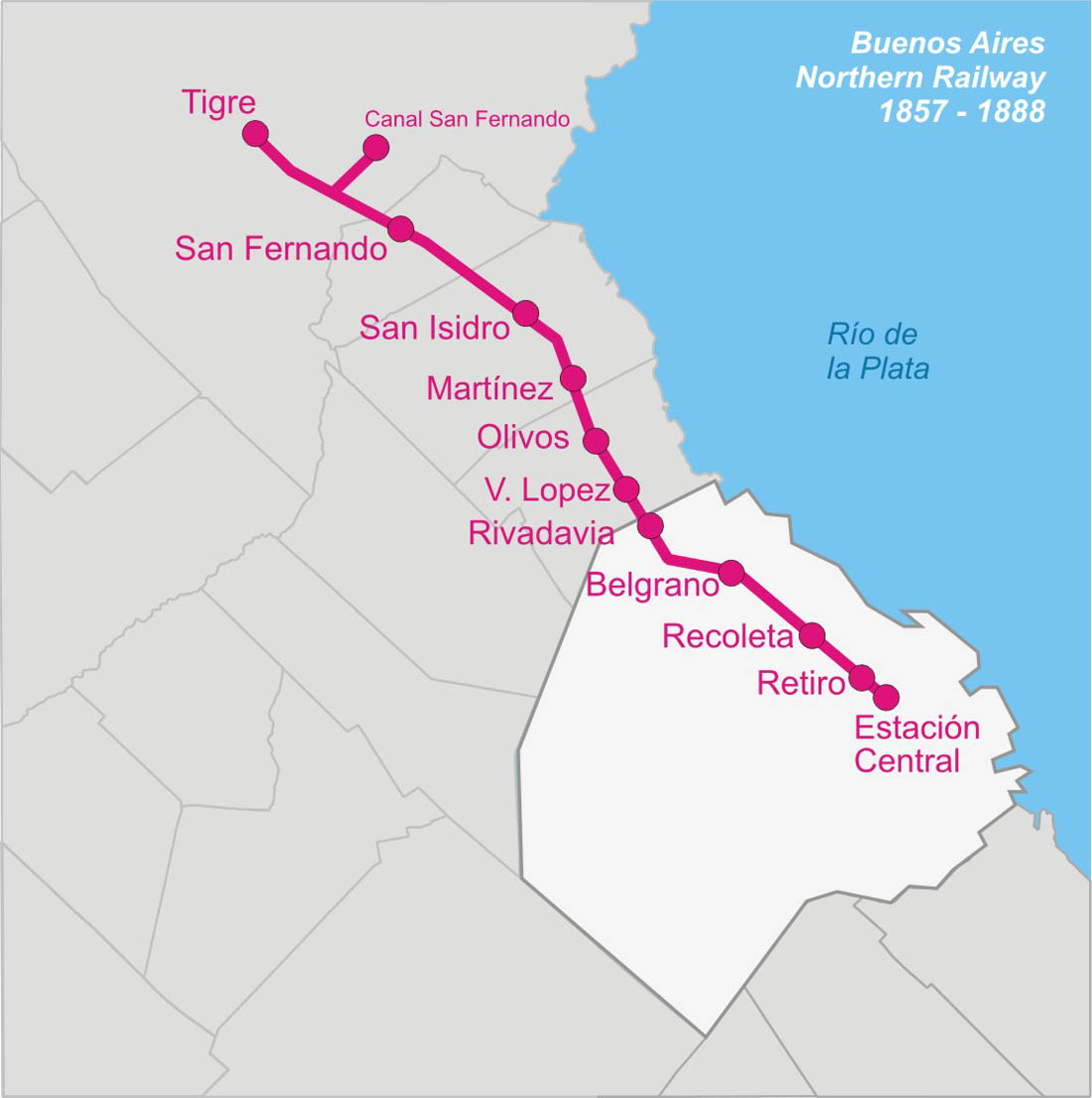

The Buenos Aires Northern Railway (BANR) (in Spanish: Ferrocarril del Norte de Buenos Aires) was a British-owned company that operated a broad gauge 5 ft 6 in (1,676 mm) railway line in Argentina, in the second half of the 19th century. The BANR was also the first railway company from the British islands to operate in Argentina.

== History ==
=== Background ===
In 1857 the government of Buenos Aires Province granted a concession to Eduardo Hopkins, owner of Buenos Aires and San Fernando Railway (in Spanish: "Ferrocarril de Buenos Aires a San Fernando") to build a railway from the city of Buenos Aires to San Fernando in Greater Buenos Aires, a distance of 28 km.

The contract was signed between Hopkins and Governor of Buenos Aires, Valentín Alsina, committing to build a horse-drawn railway that departed from Aduana Nueva (Paseo de Julio and Victoria) to Retiro where it transfer to a steam train, continuing the trip to Fernando, with several stops in Belgrano and San Isidro stations. Therefore, the "Compañía del Ferrocarril a San Fernando" SA was established, with a capital of $ 750,000. The province granted a 7% rate of interest for 20 years, apart from donating all the lands necessary for the construction of the railway. As the profit increased, the company committed to build stations in Retiro, Palermo and Olivos.

The concession was declared forfeit due to the company did not to start works in the period of time stipulated, therefore a new concession was granted to José Rodney Crosky on February 25, 1862. Nevertheless, the concession was transferred again to "Compañía del Ferrocarril del Norte de Buenos Aires", a company founded in London, on October 17.

=== Expansion ===
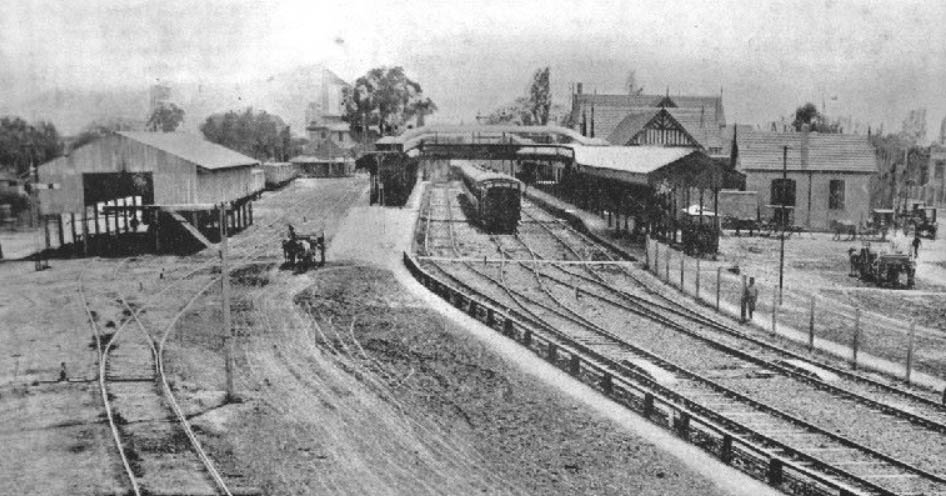
Tigre station, terminus (c. 1900)

Works began in Retiro, and shortly after that, more precisely in December 1862, the line to "Valentín Alsina" station (today "Belgrano C") was inaugurated. In 1863 the train reached San Isidro, with intermediate stops in Rivadavia and Olivos station. In February 1864 the Government allowed the company to use locomotives instead of horsecars for the Aduana-Retiro path. The railway continued its expansion, reaching San Fernando in 1864 and finally Tigre in 1865, totalizing 29 km length. Despite having requested an extension of the line to Zárate, the BANR would not build any track until it was transferred to Central Argentine Railway in 1889.

By 1870 the railway stations were: 25 de Mayo (horsecars), Retiro, Palermo (then renamed "Recoleta" before being demolished), Belgrano, Rivadavia, Olivos, San Isidro, San Fernando and Tigre. During its first years, the BANR achieved positive business results, with 8.19% of interest in 1870 and 15.22% one year later.

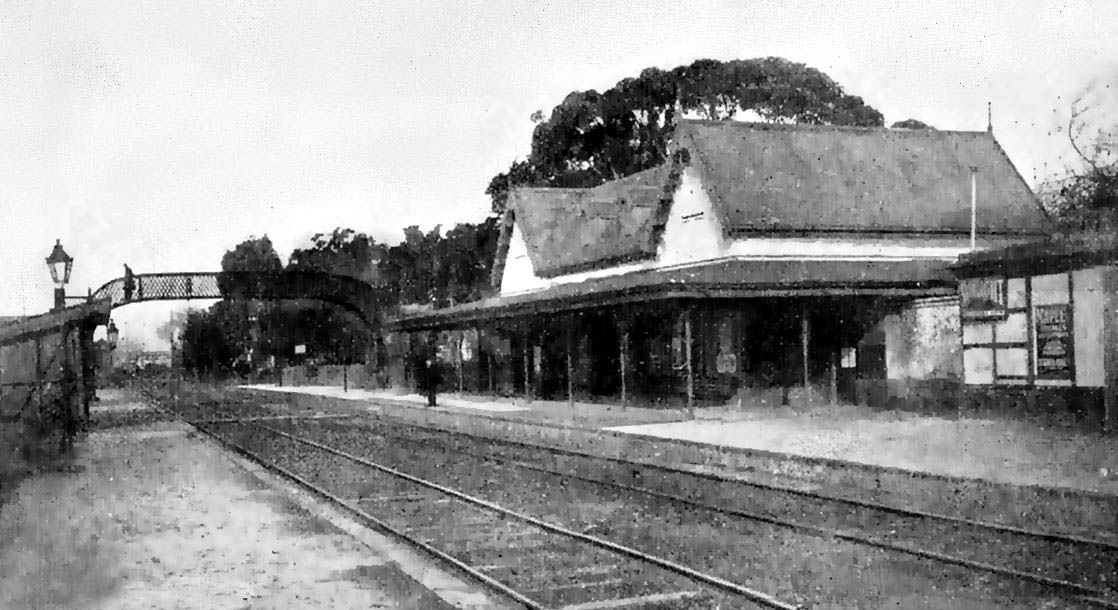
Recoleta was one of the stations of the line. It was closed in 1915 and demolished shortly after

The company also built a little 1,700-metre length branch to San Fernando Canal, built by "Hopkins y Ocampo Constructora" and opened in 1872. The branch was run by freight trains that transported goods coming from the Littoral region. When the Port of Buenos Aires was opened in 1897, commercial activities on the branch decreased considerably. The San Fernando Canal branch was finally closed in the 1970s and most of the rail tracks removed by Ferrocarriles Argentinos, the operator by then.

=== Central Station ===
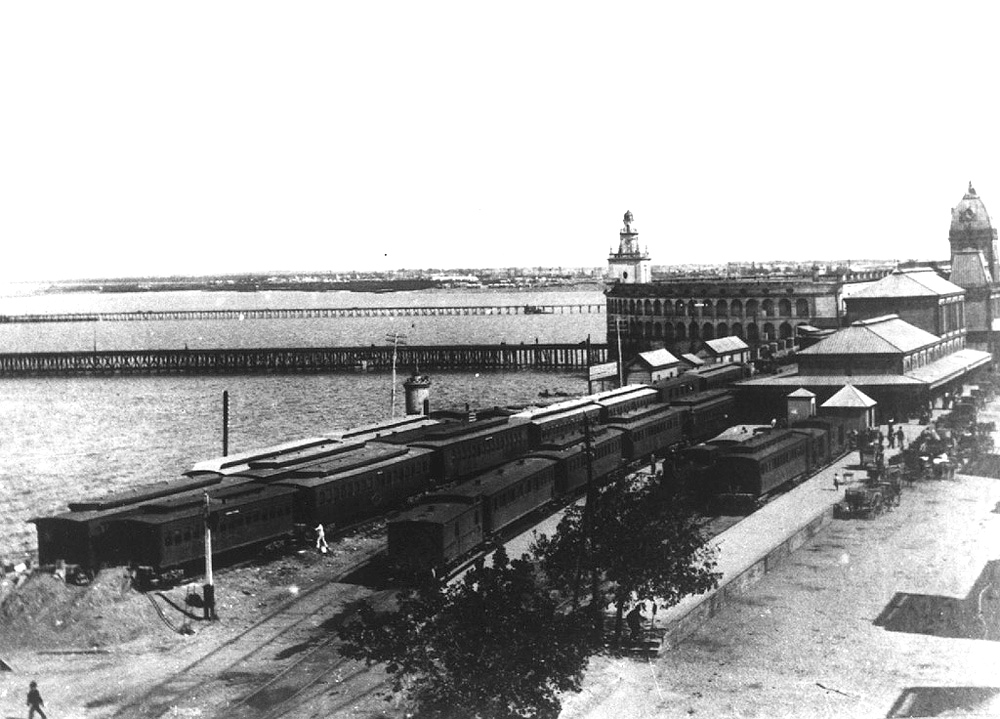
Central Station became terminus of BANR in 1873, operating until it was destroyed by fire in 1897

On the initiative of Buenos Aires and Ensenada Port Railway, on December 31, 1872, the Central Station of Buenos Aires was opened. This was placed on the junction of Paseo de Julio Avenue and Bartolomé Mitre. The station was terminus of several railway lines, such as Buenos Aires Western Railway and Buenos Aires and Rosario Railway on a side, and the BA&E and Buenos Aires Great Southern Railway on the other side. The BANR extended its path from Retiro to the Central Station in 1873.

The access station building, the BA&E had to extend the long viaduct that originally extended from Casa Amarilla to Venezuela stations.

When Central Station was destroyed by fire on February 14, 1897, BANR (owned by Central Argentine by then) and BA&E moved their terminus to Retiro and Venezuela, respectively. Soon after the BA&E moved again to Casa Amarilla in La Boca district, therefore the iron viaduct that crossed the city fell into disuse, being subsequently demolished.

In 1888 the company was taken over by the Central Argentine Railway.
