= Santa Fe and Córdoba Great Southern Railway =

Railway in Argentina

Overview
- Native name: Gran Ferrocarril del Sud de Santa Fe y Córdoba
- Status: Line took over by BA&RR in 1900
- Owner: Government of Argentina
- Locale: Santa Fe and Córdoba
- Termini: Villa Constitución; La Carlota Rufino

Service
- Services: 2
- Operator(s): SF&CGS

History
- Opened: 1890

Technical
- Track gauge: 1,676 mm (5 ft 6 in)
Routes map
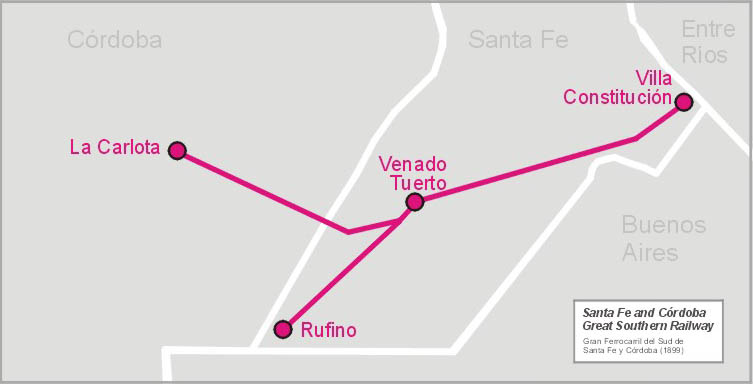

The Santa Fe and Córdoba Great Southern Railway (Spanish: Gran Ferrocarril del Sud de Santa Fe y Córdoba) was a British-owned railway company that built and operated a 5 ft 6 in (1,676 mm) broad gauge railway network in the Argentine provinces of Santa Fe and Córdoba.

== History ==
On 2 October 1886 a concession was granted to build a railway from Villa Constitución in Santa Fe Province to La Carlota in Córdoba Province. In 1889 the concession was transferred to the SF&CGS who opened the first section of the line from Villa Constitución to San Urbano (Melincué) on 30 April 1890.

The line was extended to Venado Tuerto on 8 July 1890 and to La Carlota on 24 February 1891. A branch line from Venado Tuerto to Rufino was opened on 11 March 1899.

On 20 September 1900 the company was bought by the British-owned Buenos Aires and Rosario Railway (BA&R). The sale included a concession already granted to the SF&CGS for the extension of the line from La Carlota to Río Cuarto which the BA&R opened on 26 March 1902.

== See also ==
- Buenos Aires and Rosario Railway
- Mitre Railway

== Bibliography ==
- British Railways in Argentina 1857-1914: A Case Study of Foreign Investment by Colin M. Lewis - Athlone Press (for the Institute of Latin American Studies, University of London, 1983)
