= Recoleta railway station =

Former railway station in Buenos Aires, Argentina

Recoleta
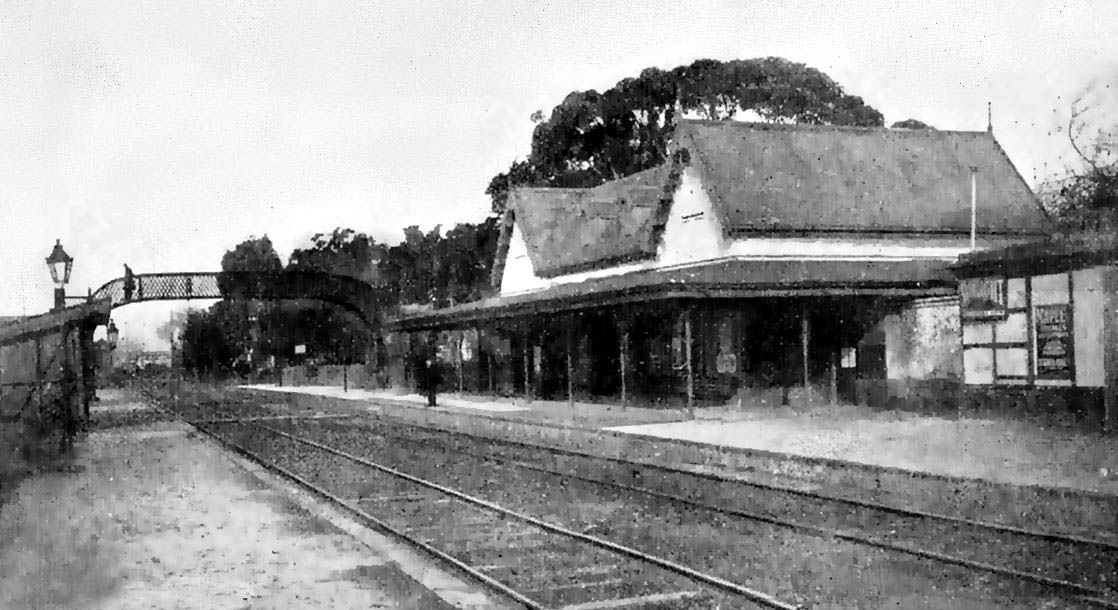
- The station in 1915

General information
- Location: Av. Figueroa Alcorta and Av. Pueyrredón; Buenos Aires; Argentina
- Coordinates: 34°35′00″S 58°23′12″W
- Owner: Government of Argentina
- Operator: Buenos Aires Northern Railway (1862–1888); Central Argentine Railway (1888–1915)
- Line: Buenos Aires Northern
- Platforms: 2
- Tracks: 2

Other information
- Status: Closed and demolished

History
- Opened: 1862
- Closed: 1915; 111 years ago
Location

Recoleta railway station (Estación Recoleta) was a railway station in the Recoleta district of Buenos Aires, Argentina. It was opened and operated by the Buenos Aires Northern Railway (Ferrocarril del Norte de Buenos Aires) since 1862, as part of the Central Station – Belgrano R line. The railway would later extend to Tigre.

The station was located close to the intersection of Alvear (current del Libertador) and Pueyrredón avenues. Other locations close to the station were La Recoleta Cemetery and the Dante Square. The station was active until 1915, when it was closed and then demolished.

== Overview ==
The station operated without a building until 1873, when a precarious wooden construction was opened. The final building was inaugurated in 1881, in the style common to other stations on the line.

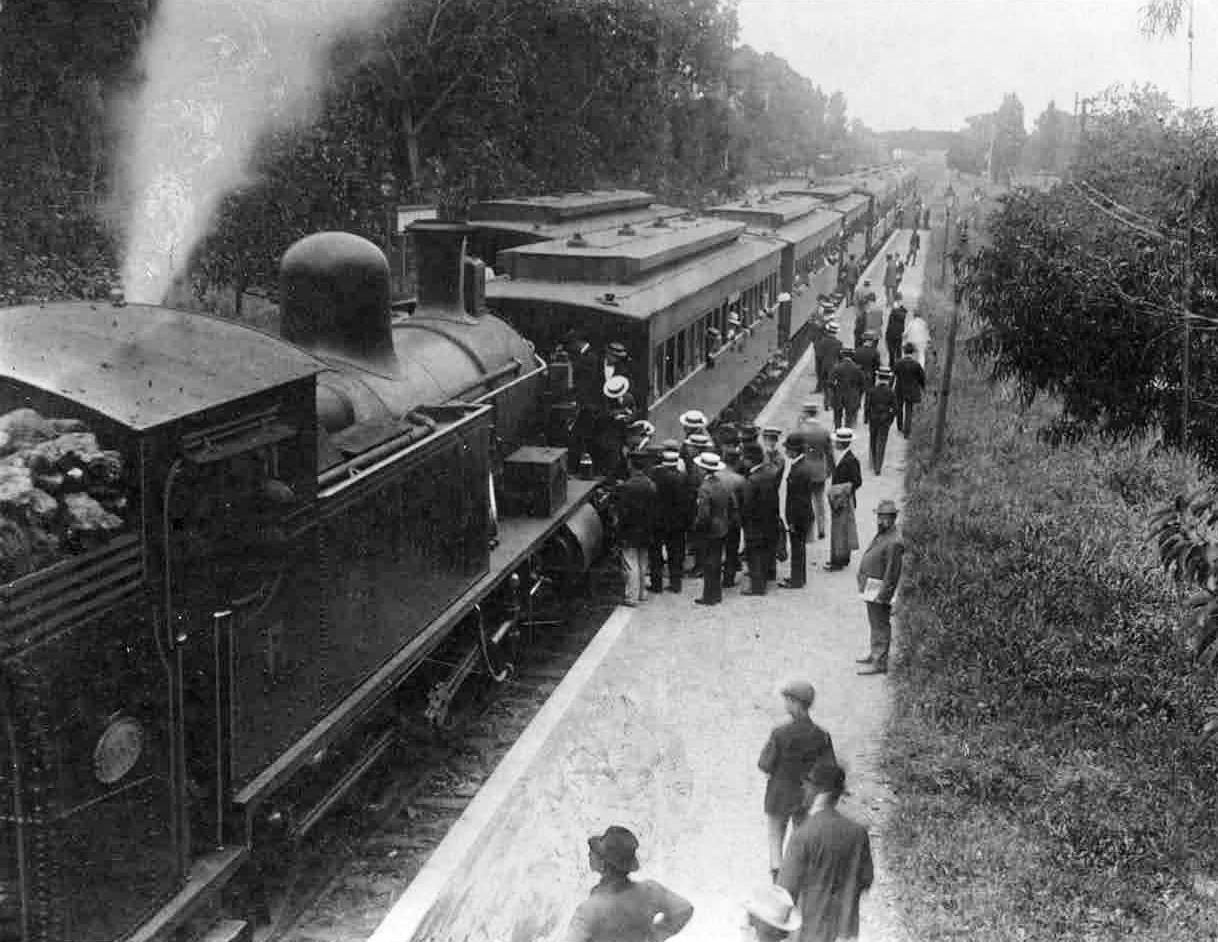
The station during a rail workers strike in 1904

The stop was located in the area currently defined by Figueroa Alcorta and Pueyrredón avenues, near to the Basilica of Our Lady of the Pillar and La Recoleta Cemetery. The small station was closed at some point at the beginning of the twentieth century. Recoleta station allowed access to "Paseo de la Recoleta", just by crossing Alvear Avenue (now Avenida del Libertador).

Recoleta was also the first destination of the "train of the dead" during the yellow fever epidemic of 1871, until the South and Chacarita cemeteries were opened. From Recoleta there was also a junction to Eleven along Centroamérica street (now Avenida Pueyrredón).

In 1888, the BANR was acquired by Central Argentine Railway and the station became part of that line to run services to Tigre.

The Recoleta station operated until 1915, when the entire original route tracks of the BA Northern Railway between Retiro and Palermo were lifted and replaced by a new quadruple track closer to Río de la Plata. That same year, Retiro Station was opened as termini.

The current Avenida Figueroa Alcorta was built on the old railway path.
