= Casa Amarilla =

Former railway station in Buenos Aires

Coordinates: 34.6311°S 58.3656°W

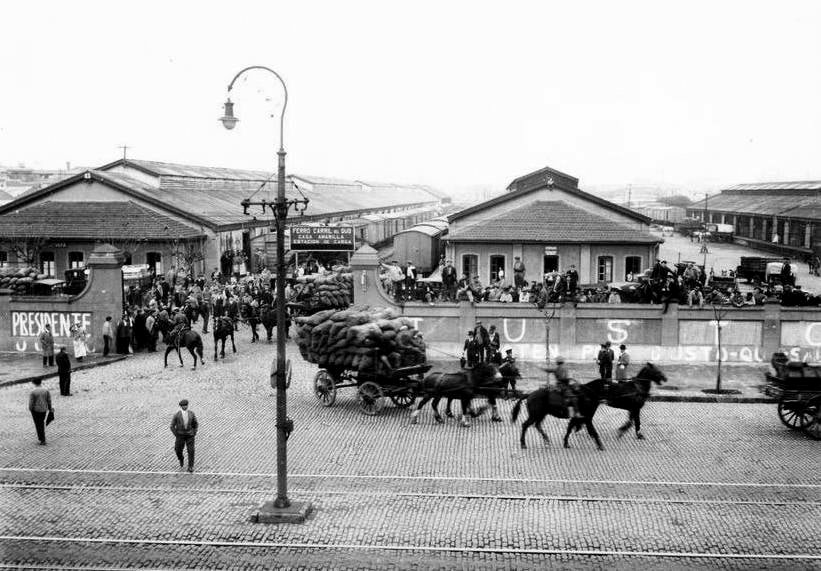
- Station depots in 1932, when it was used for freight transport exclusively

General information
- Location: Martín García and Alte. Brown Ave. La Boca, Buenos Aires; Argentina
- System: Commuter rail
- Operator: BA&EP (1865–98); BAGSR (1898–1910) (Note: For passenger services only. The station continued operating freight services.)
- Line: Buenos Aires & Ensenada

History
- Opened: 1865
- Closed: 1910; 116 years ago
Location

Casa Amarilla (in English: "Yellow House") was a railway station in the district of La Boca, Buenos Aires, built and operated by the Buenos Aires and Ensenada Port Railway. Its name was inspired on Irish Admiral William Brown's house, built in the same district and painted in yellow. Brown was one of the heroes of Argentine War of Independence leading the Argentine Navy.

== History ==
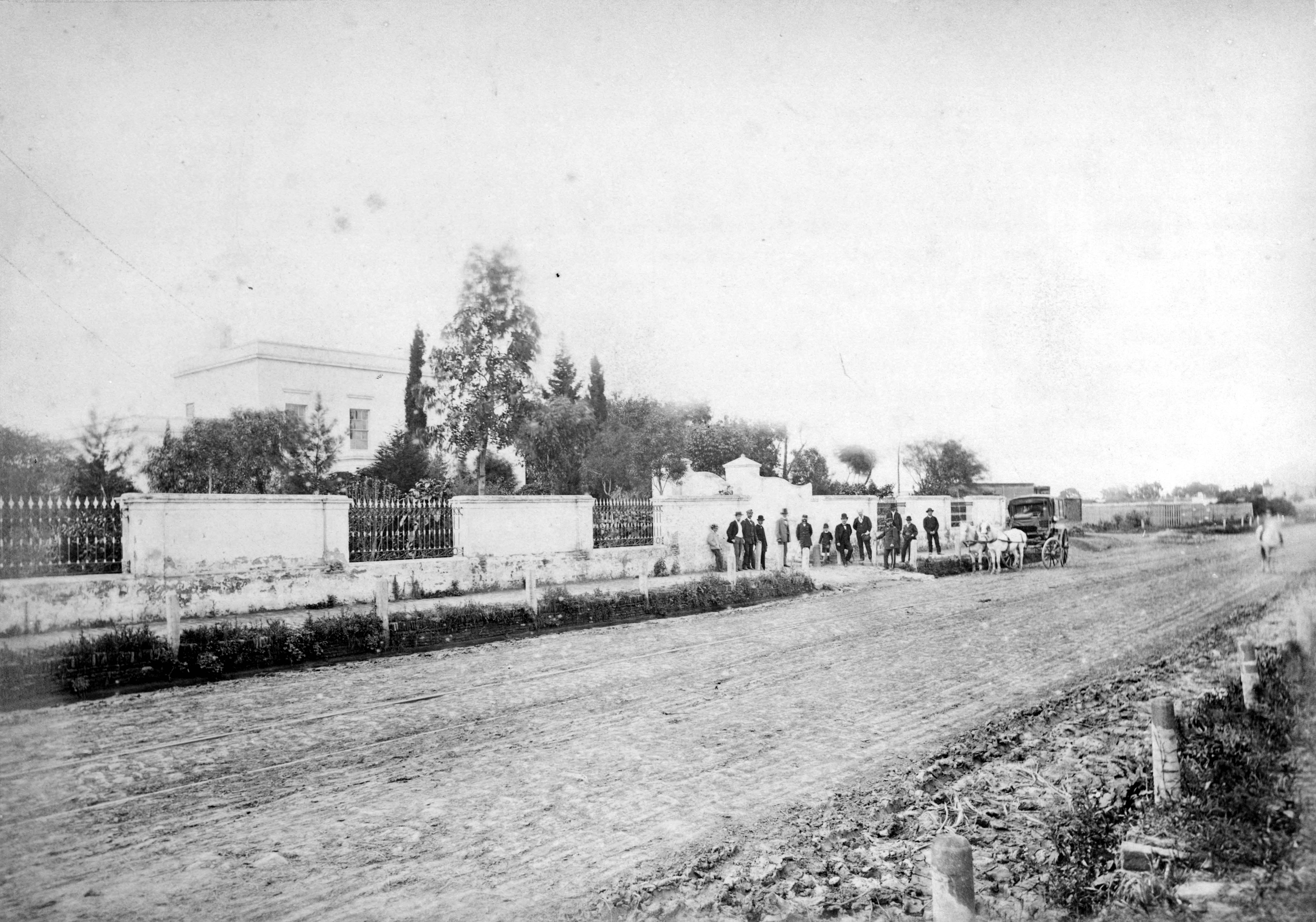
Original William Brown's Casa Amarilla, c. 1880, which inspired BA&EP to name its station

In 1812, William Brown (who had arrived to the Río de la Plata three years later) bought a field in La Boca district at the South of Buenos Aires city. On those fields he built a house on Martín García Avenue. He moved there with his family in 1813 and the house would be soon nicknamed Casa Amarilla (Yellow House) because of its color. In 1857 the Buenos Aires Province Legislature promulgated Law N° 147 that granted a concession to build a railway from Buenos Aires to Ensenada in La Plata Partido.

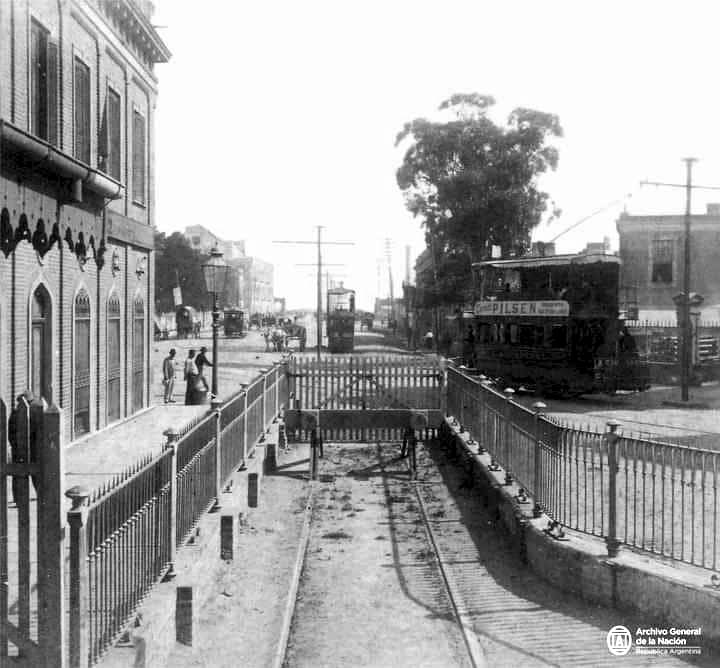
Station tracks

The works were carried out by Buenos Aires and Ensenada Port Railway (BA&EP) that made its inaugural trip on September 1, 1865, with a 5-km length. It started in Central Station, placed along with Casa Rosada, running over Paseo Colón through a viaduct until it deviated to Casa Amarilla before crossing Riachuelo to Ensenada.

When the Buenos Aires Central Station was destroyed by fire in February 1897, the BA&EP moved its terminus to Venezuela station (placed on the junction of Paseo Colón and Venezuela) during a brief period of time before moving again to Casa Amarilla. In 1898 the BA&E was acquired by rival company Buenos Aires Great Southern Railway that took over the line. The BAGSR closed Casa Amarilla station to passengers in 1910, although the station continued operating freight services.

With the closing of Casa Amarilla, the BAGSR set Constitución station as its new terminus for passengers. In 1923 Dutch company Shell opened a fuel depot on the fields where Casa Amarilla had been. The depot received and stored the tank cars sent from the company's refinery in Dock Sud. On those fields also operated a tram terminus and a potato market (opened in 1946), which was closed in the 1960s.

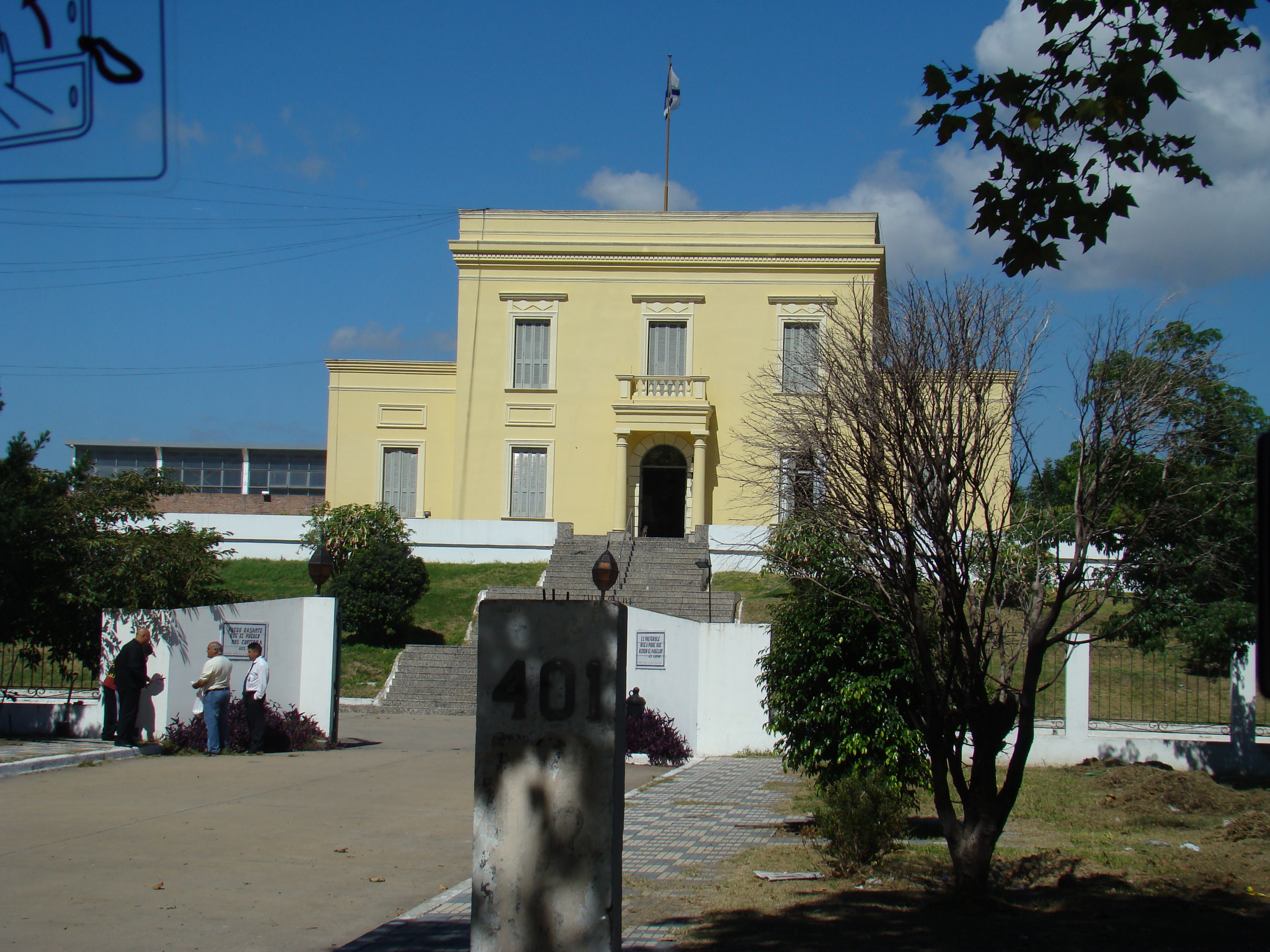
Replica of Admiral Brown's Casa Amarilla in La Boca, March 2010

A replica of Admiral Brown's house was built near to its original location, being opened on June 22, 1983, to commemorate the 206th anniversary of Brown's birth. The house currently hosts the Department of Naval Historic Studies and the "Instituto Browniano", and has a library and a room for multiple uses.

=== Historic operators ===
Operator	Period
(United Kingdom) Buenos Aires and Ensenada Port Railway	1865–1898
(United Kingdom) Buenos Aires Great Southern Railway	1898–1910

== Bibliography ==
- López, Mario (1991). Historia de los Ferrocarriles de la Provincia de Buenos Aires: 1857-1886. Buenos Aires: Ediciones Lumiere.
