= Buenos Aires and Ensenada Port Railway =

British owned railway company in Argentina, 1872–1898

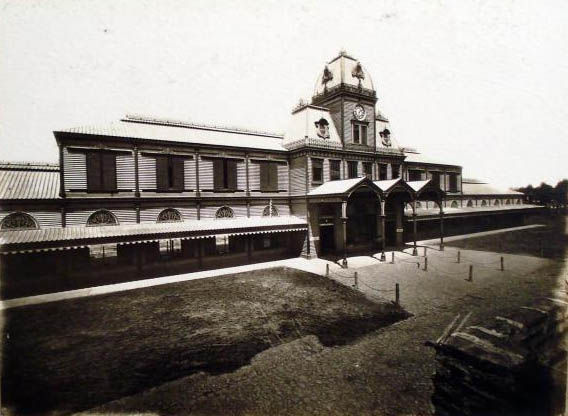
- Central Station, terminus of the line.

Overview
- Native name: Ferrocarril Buenos Aires al Puerto de la Ensenada
- Status: Defunct
- Locale: Buenos Aires Province
- Termini: Central Station (Note: The company set up terminus in Casa Amarilla after Central Station was destroyed by fire in 1897.); Ensenada (Note: Although Ensenada was the main terminus of the line, the BA&E later acquired several railway lines with their own terminus (such as Brandsen, Magdalena and Álvarez Jonte in Punta Indio Partido).)

Service
- Type: Commuter rail
- Services: 4

History
- Opened: 1872
- Closed: 1898; 128 years ago (Acquired by BA Great Southern)

Technical
- Track gauge: 5 ft 6 in (1,676 mm)
Route map
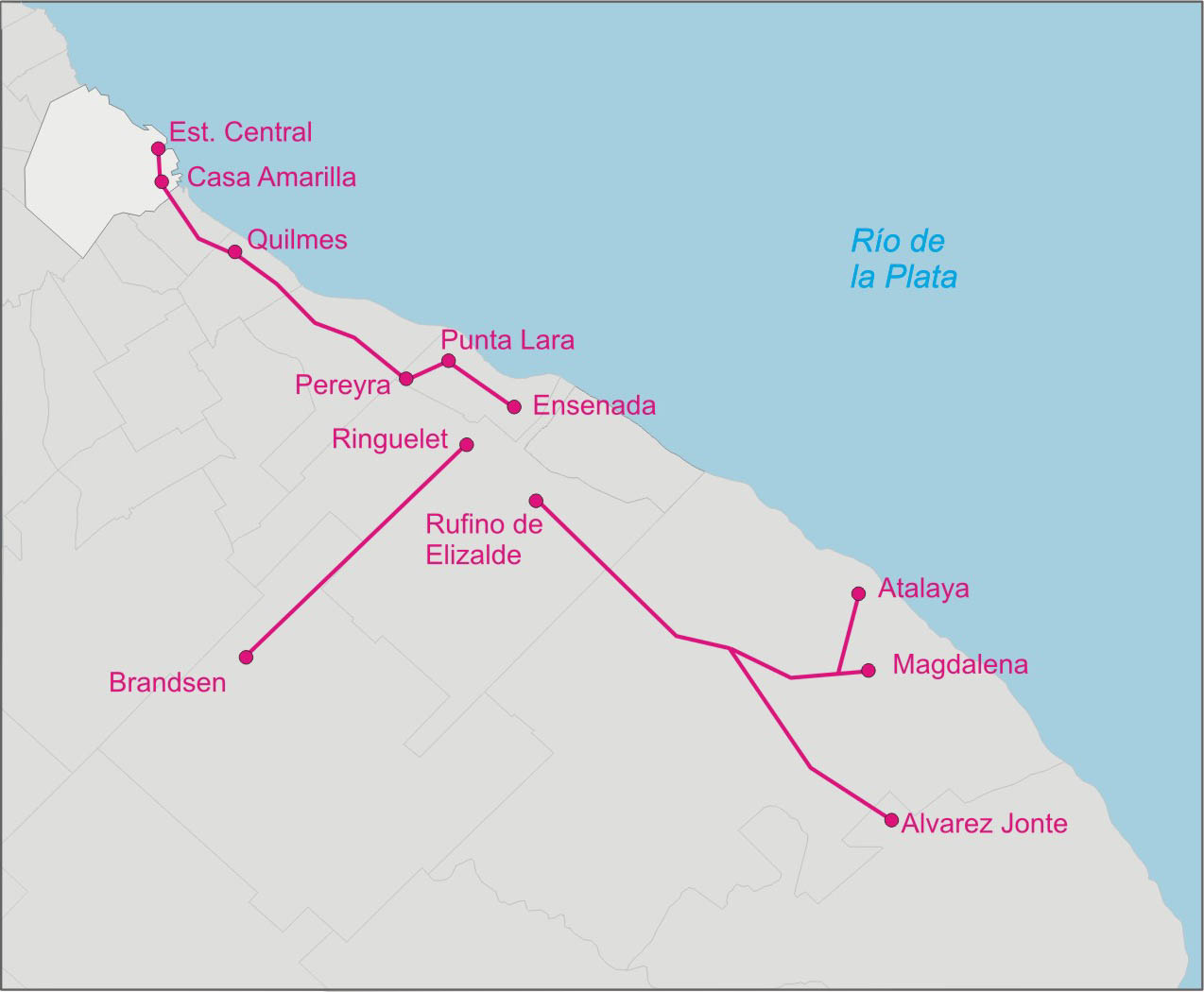

The Buenos Aires and Ensenada Port Railway (BA&EP) (in Spanish: Ferrocarril Buenos Aires y Puerto de la Ensenada) was a British-owned company that built and operated a 5 ft 6 in (1,676 mm) broad gauge railway network in Argentina towards the end of the nineteenth century. The company was taken over by its rival the British-owned Buenos Aires Great Southern Railway (BAGS) in 1898.

== History ==
=== Beginning ===
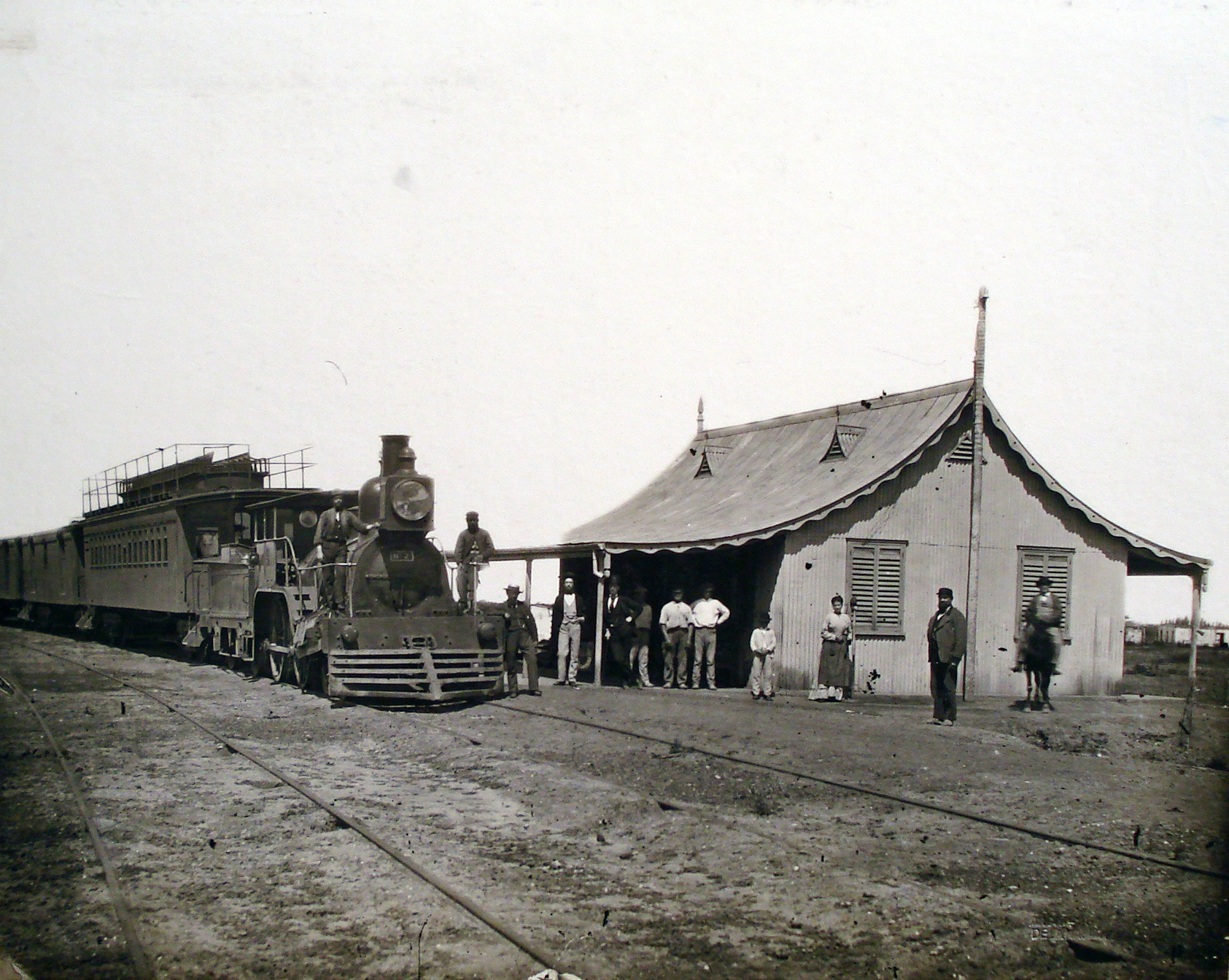
Ensenada station at late 1890s.

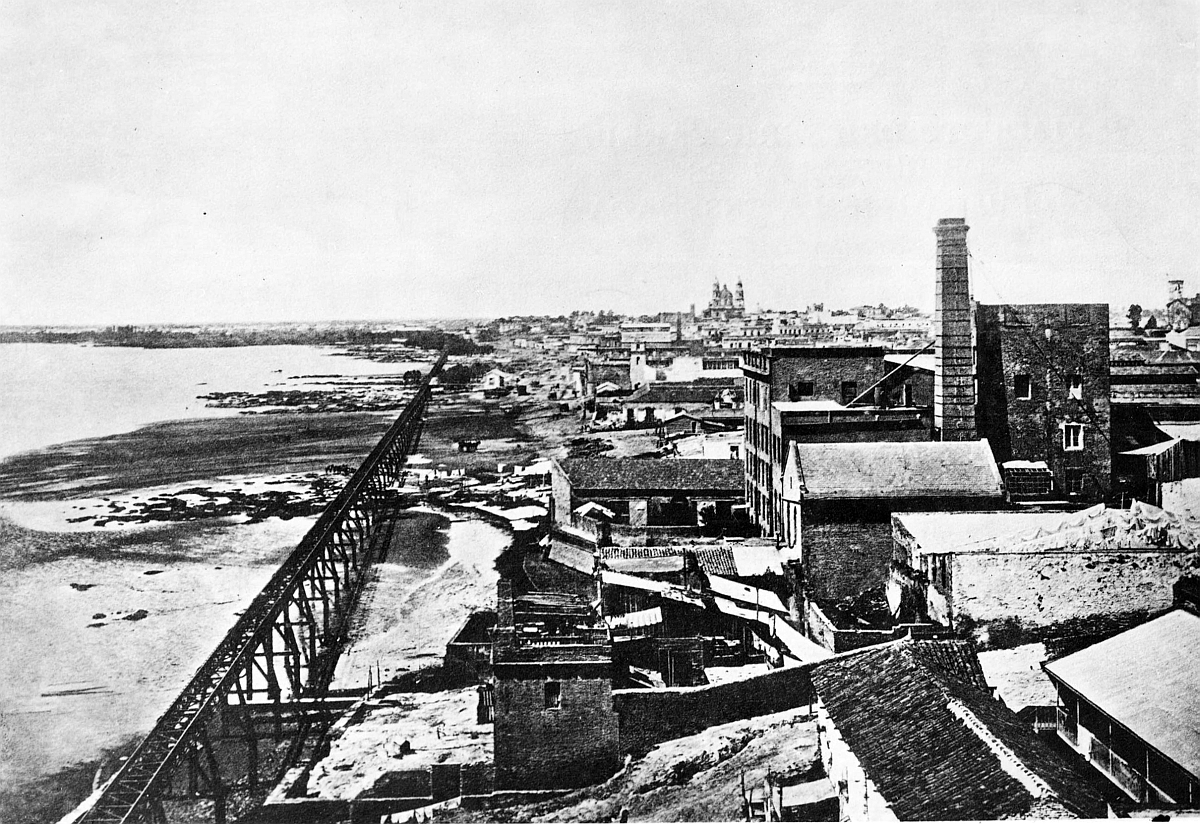
Viaduct that crossed the city of Buenos Aires, in the 1870s.

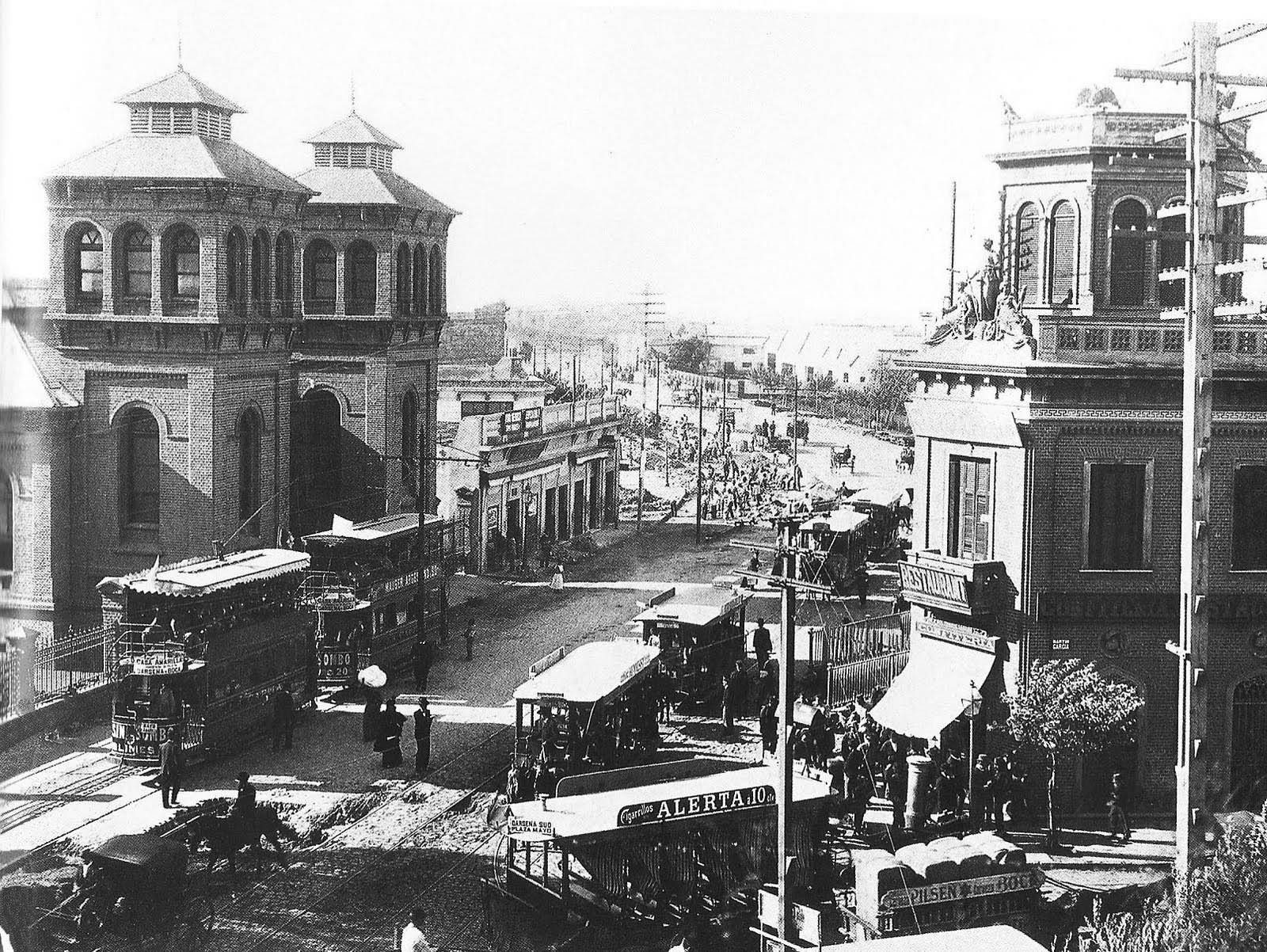
Casa Amarilla station in 1899. The station was terminus of the BA&E after Central Station was destroyed by fire.

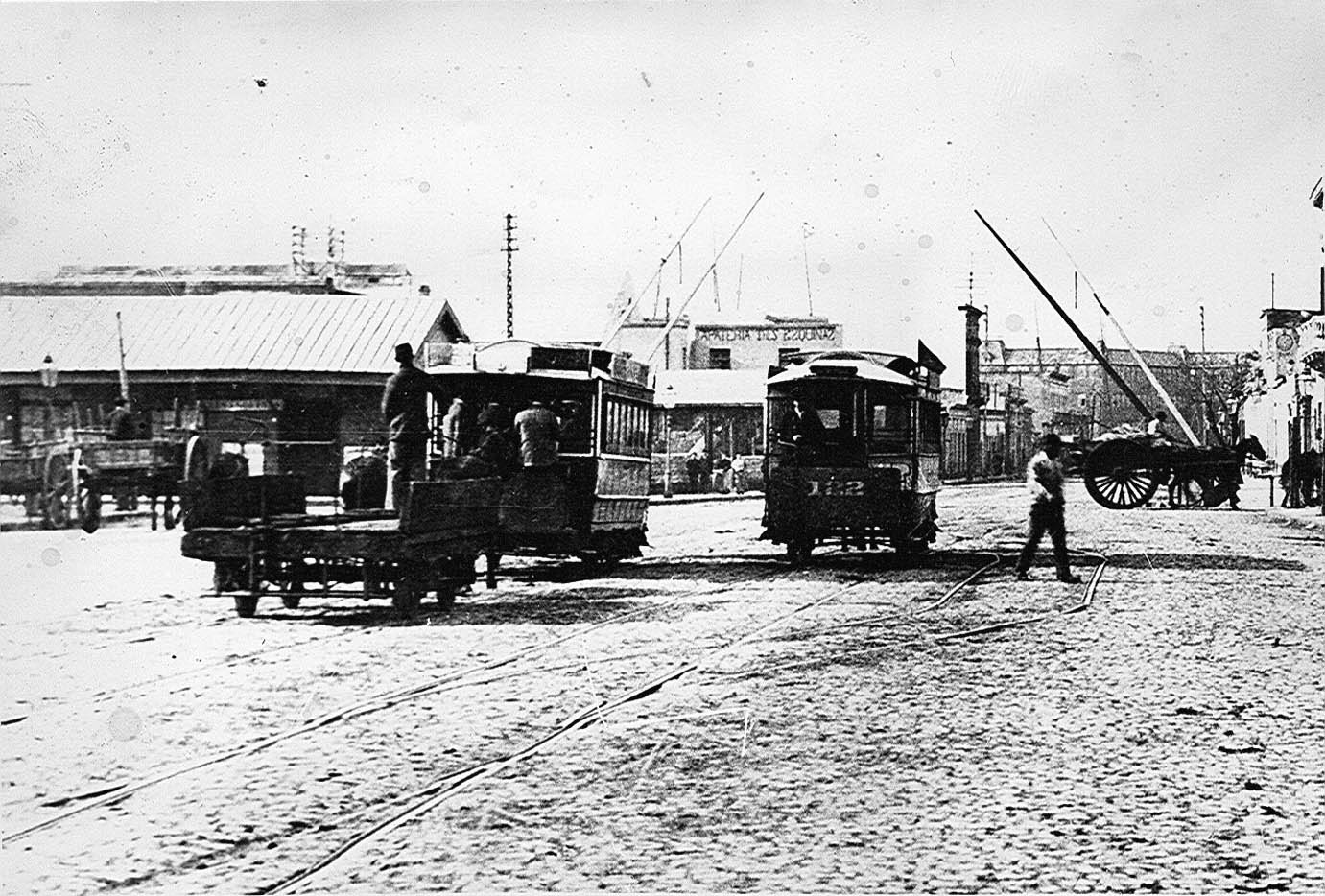
Tres Esquinas station and level crossing in Barracas.

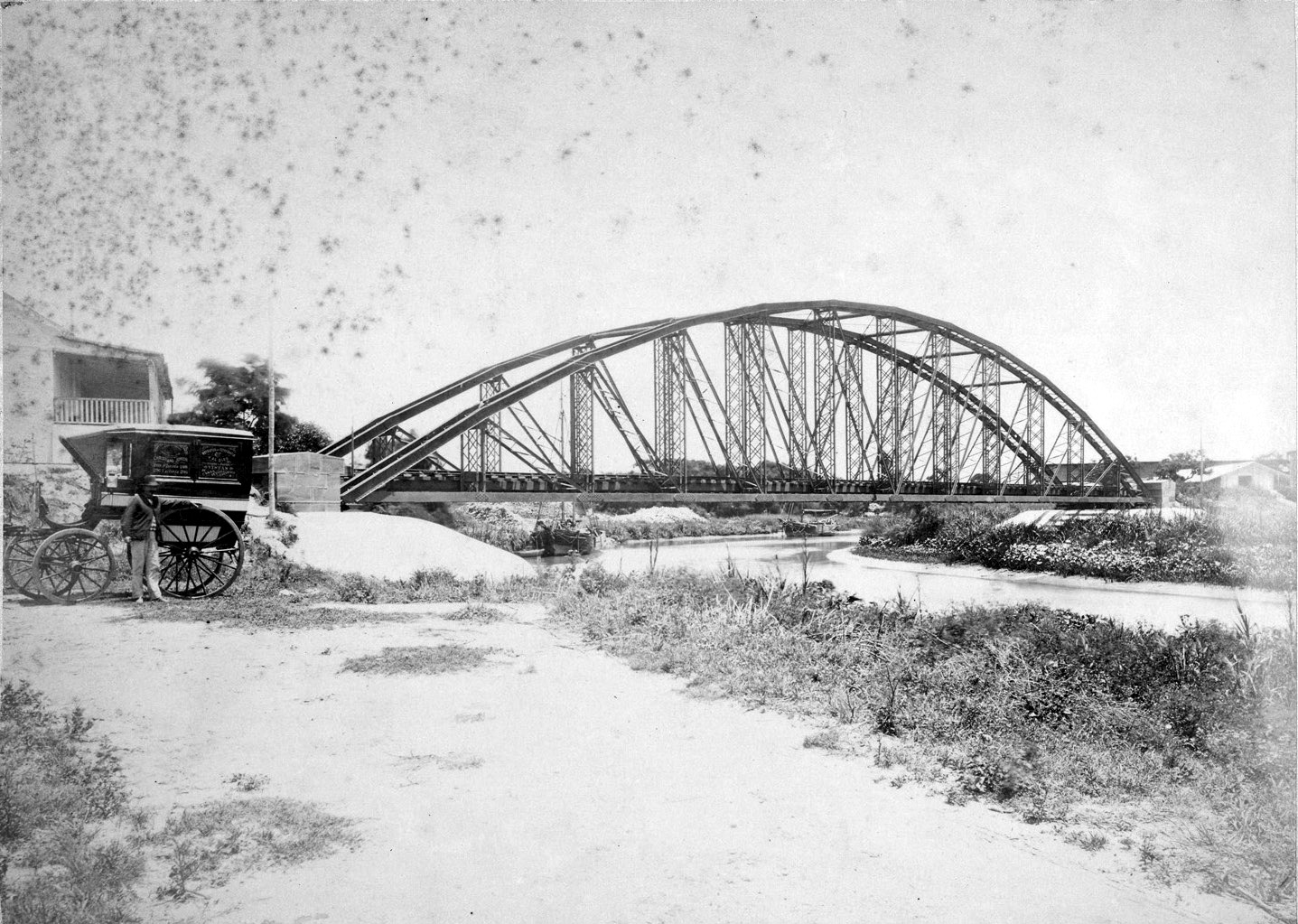
Bridge over the Riachuelo. Photo by Christiano Junior.

In 1857 the Buenos Aires Province Legislature granted the government of the province a concession to build a railway, initially known as "La Boca and Barracas Railway", from the city of Buenos Aires to Ensenada on the Río de la Plata river, near the city of La Plata which was to become the Provincial capital in 1882. The main idea that originated the construction of the line was to connect the city of Buenos Aires with Ensenada, a city in Buenos Aires Province which had a port which was important for its access and commercial demand.

In 1863 concession was granted to Brassey, Wythes & Wheelwright, company owned by American entrepreneur William Wheelwright. Initially known as Ferrocarril de La Boca, works began that same year from the corner of Paseo Colón Avenue and Venezuela street, where currently Escuela Otto Krause is placed.

=== Develop ===
The first terminus of the line was Venezuela station, where trains departed, running through a viaduct to Casa Amarilla, General Brown, and Barraca Peña, finishing in Tres Esquinas station, reached by the line in September 1865. One year later, a branch from General Brown to Muelle de La Boca was opened.

In 1872 Buenos Ayres and Ensenada Port Railway Company (BA&EP) was officially established, taking over the railway previously founded and operated by Wheelwright. That same year Central Station was inaugurated as terminus of the line. The station, located on the corner of Paseo de Julio Avenue (currently Leandro N. Alem) and Piedad street (today Bartolomé Mitre), consisted of a modern building made of wood and brought directly from Great Britain.

That same year the tracks extended to Quilmes, reaching that city on April 18. The train crossed over Riachuelo through an iron bridge that was destroyed by flood in 1884, being quickly replaced by another one made of wood. BA&E finally reached Ensenada on December 31, 1872, being President of Argentina Domingo Sarmiento one of the passengers of the inaugural service. Therefore, the railway line completed an extension of 61 km.

In 1882 the city of La Plata was established as capital of the province. The government of Buenos Aires Province decided that La Plata needed to be connected to the rest of the country by train. As the province owned 100% of rival company Buenos Aires Western Railway, the government commissioned BAWR the construction of the railway.

Therefore, the BAWR built a railway line that joint BA&E in Ensenada, reaching La Plata via Tolosa, a city of La Plata Partido. In 1884 the BAWR built a branch from Tolosa to Pereyra station. In 1883 works to build the La Plata port began, which would be finished in 1890. The port was located near to BA&E dock. On 1889 the BA&E built a new station in Ensenada, closer to the port of La Plata.

In 1888 BAWR sold the Rufino de Elizalde – Magdalena branch to a newly formed company, "Buenos Aires, Ensenada and Costa Sud Railway" (BAE&SC), which was owned by BA&E. This company had plans to extend its services to Tandil and Balcarce, competing with British-owned company Buenos Aires Great Southern Railway that had the concession to build railway lines in that region. The dispute was solved through an agreement specifying that BAE&SC would build its line only to Chascomús. From then on, lines would be exclusively constructed by BAGSR.

Nevertheless, BAE&SC did not build any line, apart from being severely damaged by the 1890 financial crisis. Therefore, the company rented the branch operated by BA&E, with the condition that BA&E took over previously undertaken commitments. BA&E projected a line from Arditi to Punta Piedras. Finally only a small part of this line was constructed, until the Punta Rieles station. Vieytes and Álvarez Jonte stations were opened in December 1892, adding an extension from Magdalena (renamed "Empalme Magdalena" when the BAWR connected it with the Magdalena downtown years later) to the port of Atalaya. The line was inaugurated on November 1, 1893.

=== Final years ===
At the end of 1890 BA&E acquired the branch Lomas de Tolosa (current Ringuelet) - Ferrari (current Brandsen) to BAWR, which had also purchased all the services in La Plata and cities around. The BA&E requested to extend its services from Ensenada station to La Plata port. The main reason was the opening of the port of Buenos Aires in 1897. The operation of a port in the main city of Argentina caused a severe crisis to BA&E due to the commercial activity moved to Buenos Aires instead of Ensenada.

Estación Central of Buenos Aires was destroyed by fire in February 1897. As a result, BA&E moved again to its original terminus location on Paseo Colón and Venezuela during a brief period of time, until the terminus was moved to Casa Amarilla. Therefore, the viaduct used by the line to connect Buenos Aires and Ensenada, fell into disuse and was later demolished.

Always in fierce competition with the BAGS, the BA&EP was finally taken over by its rival company in 1898.

== Railway branches ==
The BA&E expanded its network with the acquisition of some branches from other companies. The complete list of branches owned by the BA&E before it was merged to BAGSR is listed as follows:

BA&E Railway network (1898)
Line	Former owner
Central Station − Ensenada	−
Ringuelet − Brandsen	BA Western
R. de Elizalde − Magdalena	BA Western
Magdalena − Atalaya Port	−
R. de Elizalde − Alvarez Jonte	−
