= El Chañar =

Coordinates: 26°46′S 65°02′W

- Interactive map of El Chañar
- Country: Argentina
- Province: Tucumán Province
- Time zone: UTC−3 (ART)

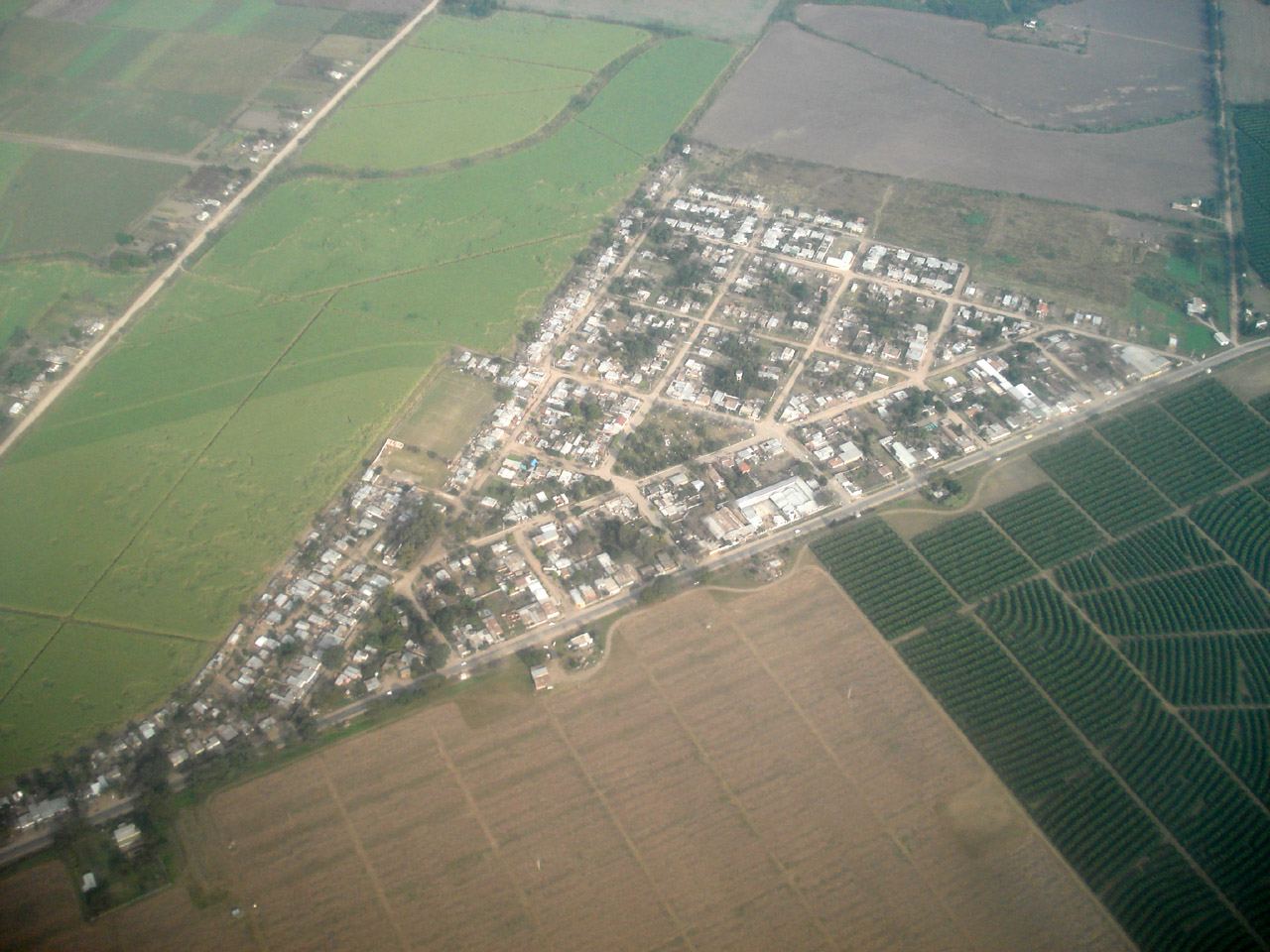
Aerial view of the town of El Chañar, Burruyacu Department, Tucumán

El Chañar is a settlement in Tucumán Province in northern Argentina.
