= Central Station (Buenos Aires) =

Former railway station in Buenos Aires, Argentina

Coordinates: 34.6064°S 58.3698°W

Central Station Estación Central
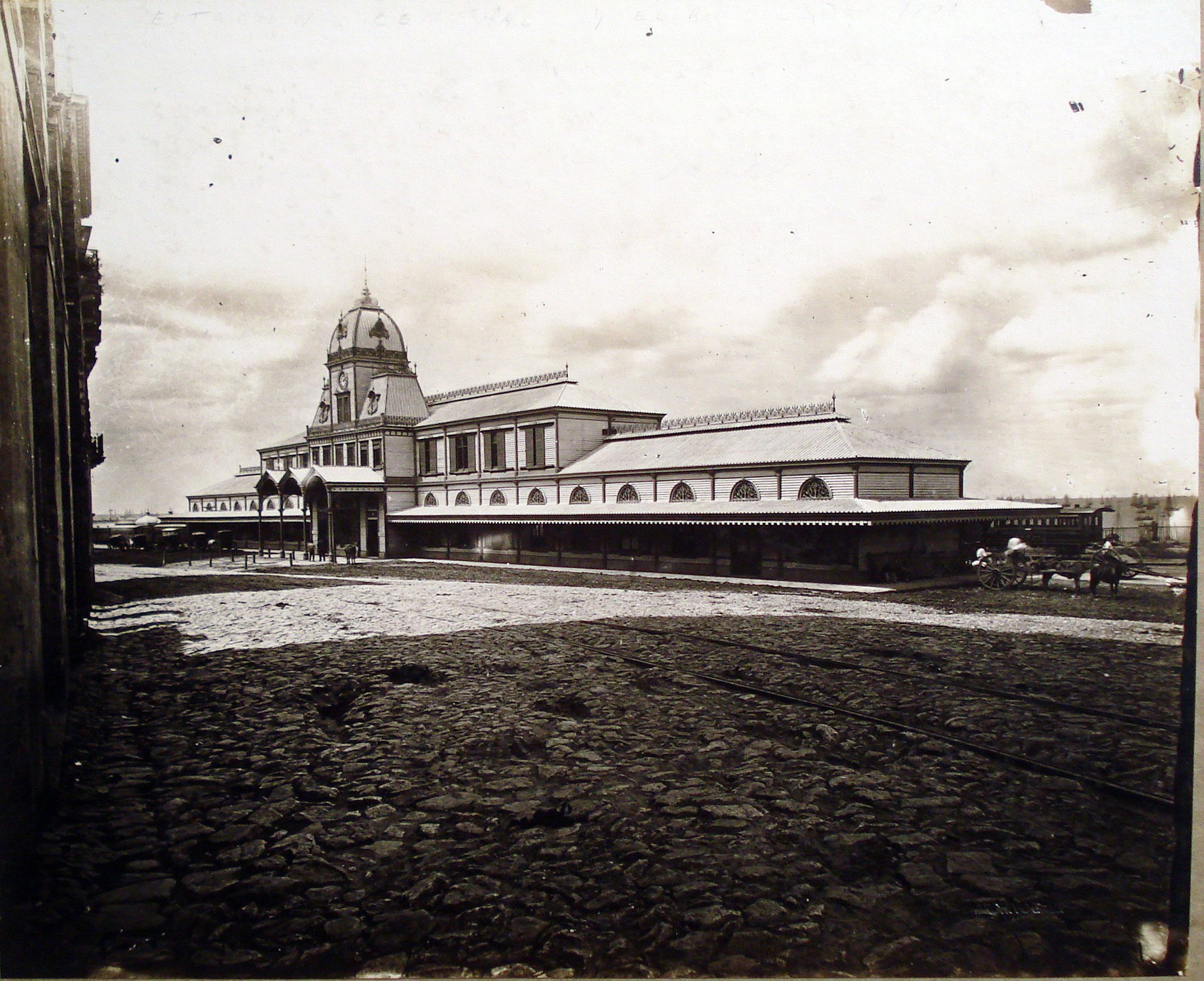
- Facade of the station in 1875. Photo by Christiano Junior.

General information
- Location: Av. Paseo de Julio and Piedad, Buenos Aires, Argentina
- System: Commuter rail
- Owner: BA & Ensenada
- Line: List: BA & Ensenada; Western; BA & Pacific; BA & Rosario; BA & Northern; Central Argentine

Construction
- Platform levels: 3

History
- Opened: 12 Aug 1872
- Closed: 1897; 129 years ago
Location
- Location within Buenos Aires Location within Argentina

The Central Station (in Spanish: Estación Central) was a railway station in the city of Buenos Aires, Argentina, which operated from 1872 to 1897.

The station was a union station of Buenos Aires shared by most of the separate railway companies existing by then, and functioned as terminus of most of the railway lines thus allowing passengers to connect conveniently between them. It was built in 1872 and located by what was then the shores of the Rio de la Plata next to the current Casa Rosada. The station building was a wood structure built in Great Britain, that had a slate mansard roof and a little tower with a clock and a dome on the top. When the Puerto Madero was inaugurated in 1897, the railway tracks of the Central Station blocked the access from the city to the port, and after a fire in 1897 use of the station was abandoned.

== History ==
=== Background ===
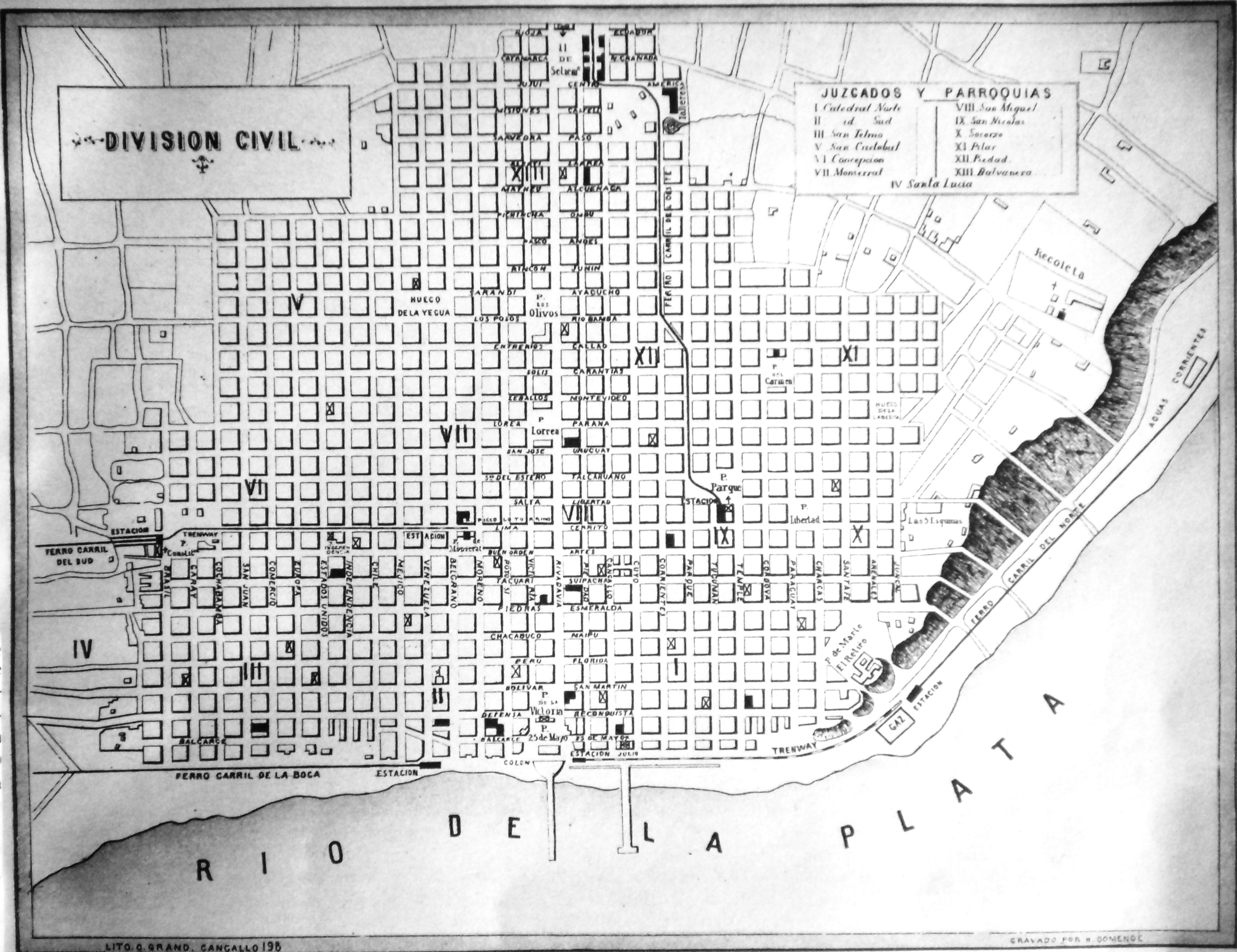
Map of Buenos Aires in 1870 with the different railway terminals prior to the opening of the Central Station.

From the 1850s onwards, railway lines began to connect the city of Buenos Aires with the surrounding cities and ports. All the different British railway companies then operating in Argentina initially opened each their own railway station as the terminals of their railway lines originating in Buenos Aires. Eventually, however they managed to reach an agreement to share a joint station, thus allowing passengers to connect conveniently between them. By August 1872 all the railway companies operating in the city signed the agreement for a common use of the Central Station, which until then had been owned by Buenos Aires and Ensenada Port Railway (BA&EP).

Railway network of the city of Buenos Aires in the 1880s where Central Station can be seen.

The new station was inaugurated on 12 August 1872 in a ceremony attended by the President of Argentina Domingo Faustino Sarmiento. The use of the station was shared by five railway companies, the Buenos Aires and Ensenada Port Railway (BA&EP), the Buenos Aires Western Railway (BAWR), the Buenos Aires and Pacific Railway (BA&P), the Buenos Aires and Rosario Railway (BA&R), the Buenos Aires Northern Railway (BANR) and the Central Argentine Railway (CA).

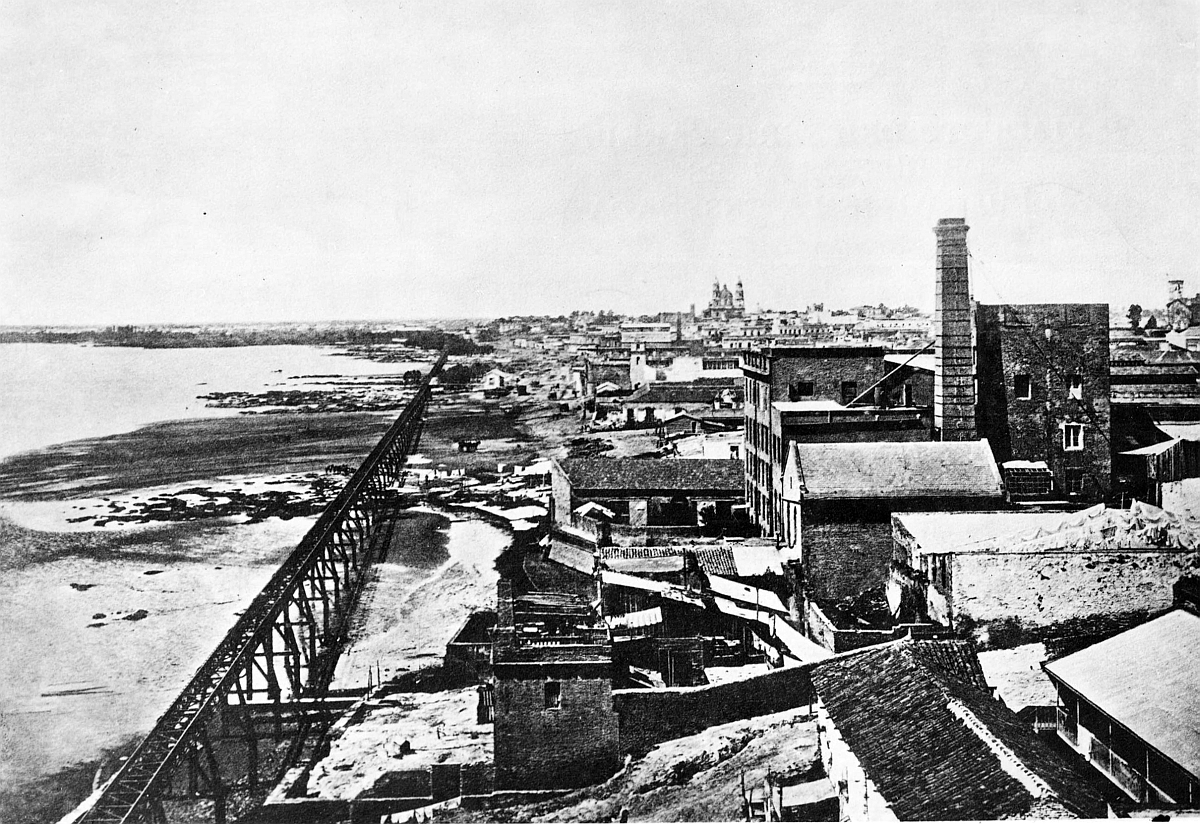
Viaduct of the Buenos Aires and Ensenada Port Railway.

The Central Station was located by the Rio de la Plata, next to the current Casa Rosada on the corner of Paseo de Julio Avenue (currently Avenida Leandro N. Alem) and Piedad street (today Bartolomé Mitre), between Paseo de Julio and the wall that protected the riverbank. Trains arrived from the South by means of an iron viaduct on tall columns, that extended from Casa Amarilla station to Victoria street (the current Hipólito Yrigoyen street). The route of the viaduct would later be used to build the Paseo Colón Avenue.

To allow for access to the Central Station, on 1 October 1872 the Buenos Aires Great Southern Railway (BAGS) also opened a short connecting branch line from Barracas al Norte station (the current Hipólito Yrigoyen railway station) to Tres Esquinas railway station on the Buenos Aires and Ensenada Port Railway (BA&EP).

=== The station ===
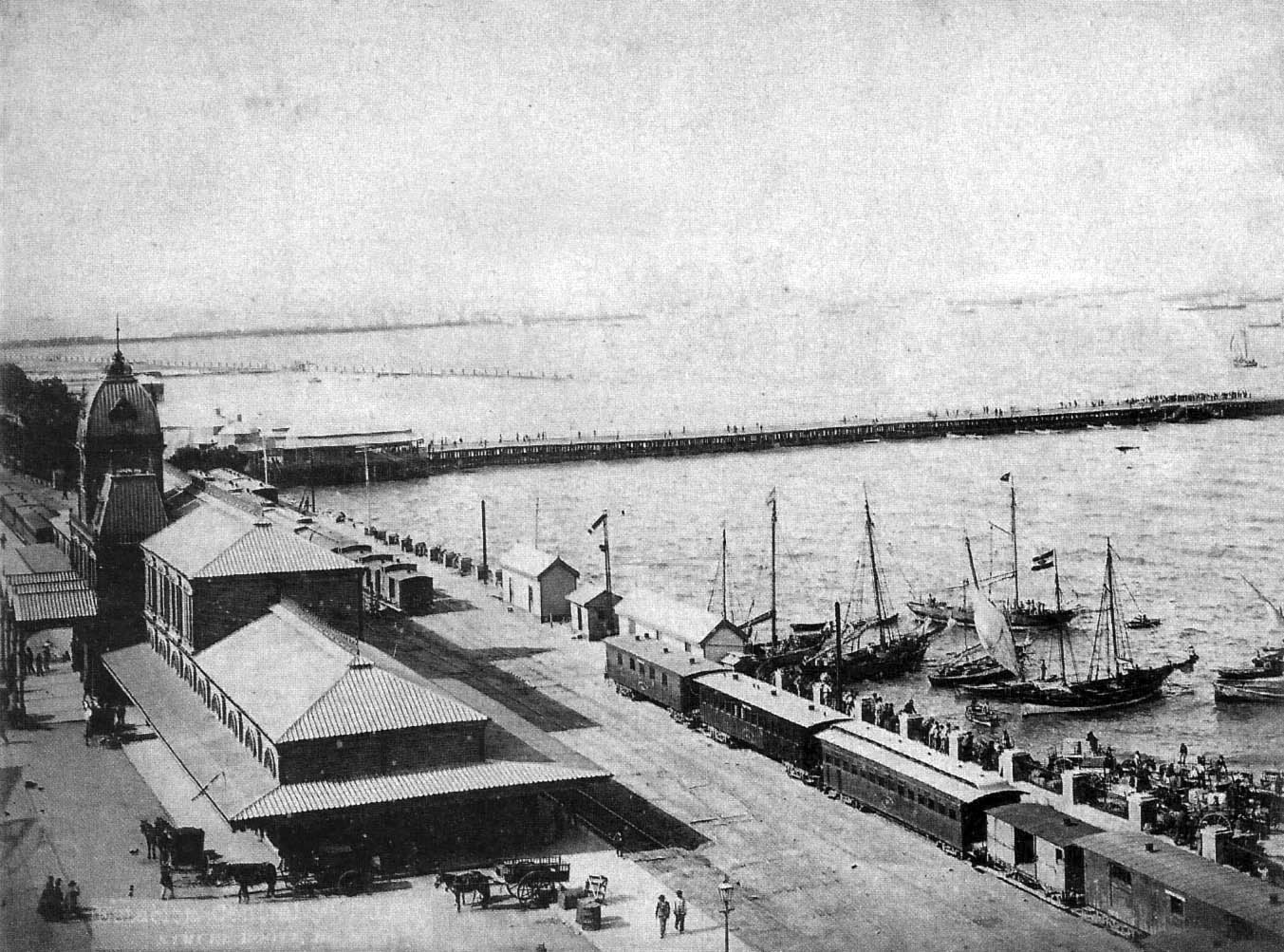
Lateral view of the station in 1885. At right, the Río de la Plata with the passenger pier and customs entrance.

When the Central Station was opened, the tracks ran from north to south directly alongside what was then the shores of the Río de la Plata. The Taylor Customs House with its loading bay was located in the south end of the station, and at the north end was the entrance to the passenger pier.

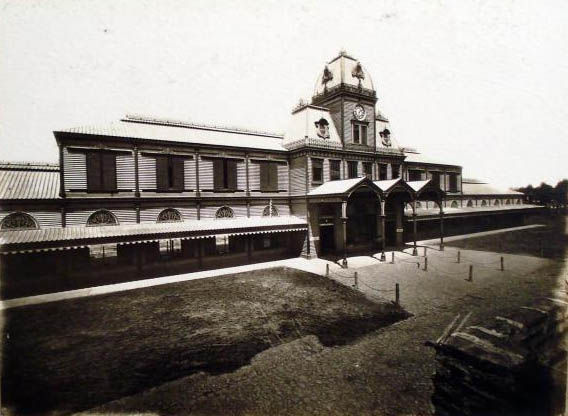
The front facade seen from the north side.

The modern station building, built in wood, was brought from Great Britain by entrepreneur William Wheelwright, although it had originally been intended to be used in India (then a British colony). It had a slate mansard roof and a little tower with a clock and a dome on the top. The station had a platform over the main track and other two. Its structure also included two coffeehouses and two ladies rooms.

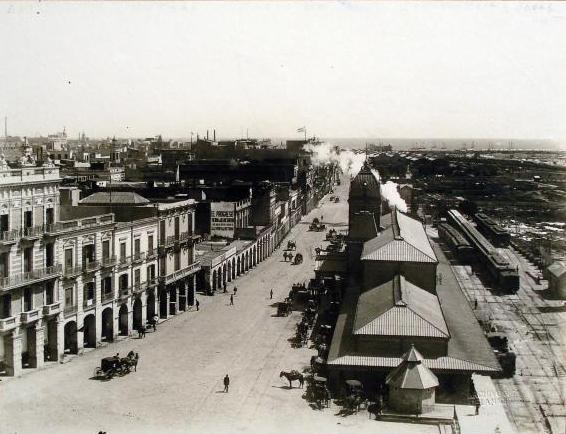
Paseo de Julio (currently Avenida Leandro N. Alem) and the Central Station, c. 1895.

The Central Station served as terminus not only for BA & Ensenada but for other railways such as BA Western, BA & Rosario and BA & Northern.

It was a real 'central' station, with a platform over the main line and other two for unused tracks, with a capacity for 4 or 5 trains. The first of them named "Vía Belgrano" because it was generally used for services to the city of Belgrano (...) The other one named "Four and a half track", because trains to Tigre departed at that time (4.30), being them amongst the main services of Northern Railway. Facilities for passengers existed in duplicate, on a side facilities for BAGSR passengers and on the other side, for the BAN. They don't even mingle to drink a whisky so there were two bars, two ladies' room, and so on. Facilities for employees included two post offices at both ends of the station, and, in the middle of the building, a ticket office with a passage on the North side and another on the South side for their respective services. Under one of the stairs stayed a telegraph office, and under the other stair there was a post office. In conclusion, nothing else was necessary there. Chief Inspector and his other two inspectors could use the entire platform as their offices

— William Rögind

=== Closure ===
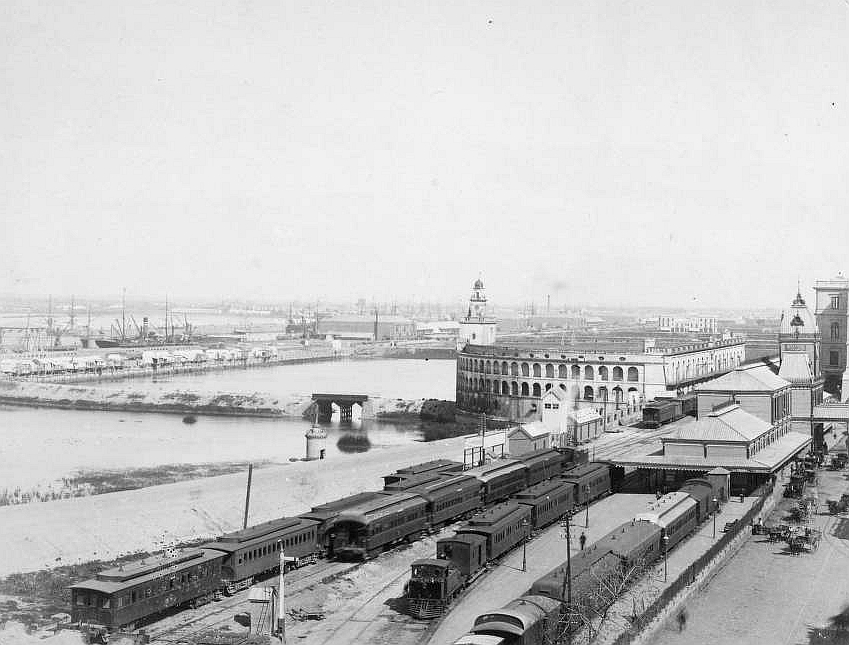
Central Train Station seen from the north.

A sudden economic and population boom led the new President of Argentina, Julio Roca, to commission the development in 1881 of an ambitious port to supplement the recently developed facilities at La Boca, in Buenos Aires' southside. The project required the reclaiming of over 200 hectares (500 acres) of underwater land from the Rio de la Plata off the station. When the Puerto Madero was inaugurated in 1897, the railway tracks blocked the lands and the access from the city to the port of Buenos Aires, therefore many people opposed the railway transit across the city of Buenos Aires. During the 1890s the National Government considered moving the Central Station to the Puerto Madero, although it was never carried out.

On February 14, 1897, the station was completely destroyed by fire. The next day, the company built some wood shacks to sell tickets as a replacement of the destroyed station, but they were removed by the Government of the city. On March 19 the National Government ordered to remove all tracks from Casa Amarilla to Retiro, also forbidding Central Station was reconstructed. Finally, on July 1, the line was closed.

As a result, the railway companies existing by then (BA & Rosario, Central Argentine and BA & Pacific) had to leave the place, moving to Retiro station, where they have remained until present days. BA&E established Venezuela station as terminus, although shortly after it was moved to Casa Amarilla.

== Bibliography ==
- Parise, Eduardo (6 July 2015). "Cuando los trenes llegaban al Bajo". Clarín.
- Rögind, William (1937). Historia del Ferrocarril del Sud (in Spanish). Buenos Aires: Establecimiento Gráfico Argentino. OCLC 1930478.
