= Sarratea railway station =

Former railway station in Rosario, Argentina

Sarratea
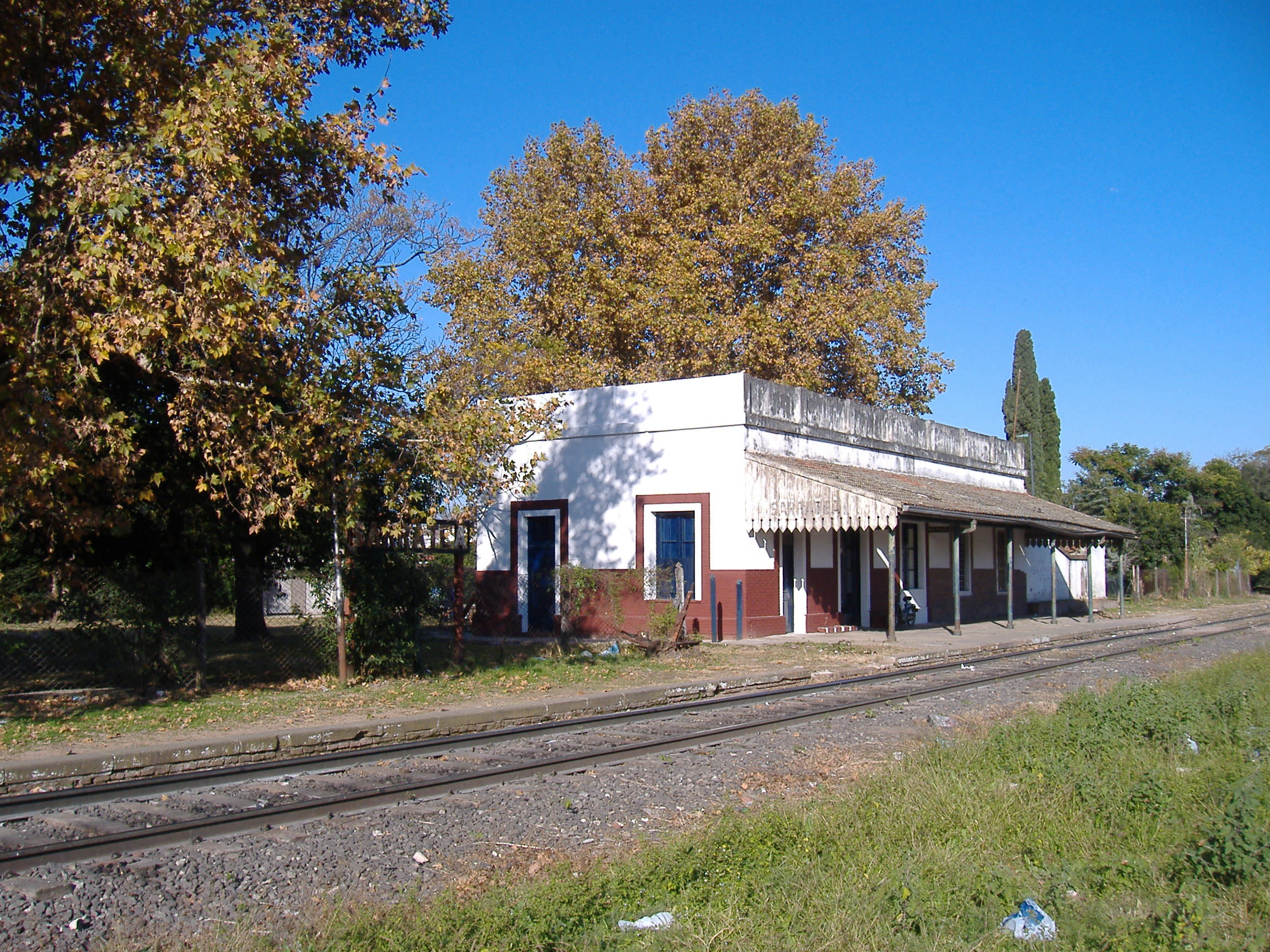
- Sarratea station (facing south) in 2007.

General information
- Location: Gallo 1200; Rosario; Argentina
- Coordinates: 32°53′29″S 60°41′58″W
- System: Inter-city
- Owner: Government of Argentina
- Operator: BA & Rosario (1890–1908); Central Argentine (1908–1948); Ferrocarriles Argentinos (1948–1977)
- Line: Mitre
- Platforms: 1
- Tracks: 2

History
- Opened: 1890
- Closed: 1977; 49 years ago
Location

Sarratea is a former railway station located in the north of the city of Rosario, Santa Fe, Argentina. Private company Nuevo Central Argentino operates the line for freight services, although the station is no longer active.

== History ==
The station was opened about 1890 by the Buenos Aires and Rosario Railway, a company that would be absorbed by the Central Argentine Railway in 1908. The railway ran north from the Patio Parada node and proceeded towards the city of Santa Fe, capital of the province. The station was named after Manuel de Sarratea, an Argentine diplomat, politician and soldier who took part of the May Revolution and was Governor of Buenos Aires Province (1820).

After the entire Argentine railway network was nationalised in 1948, the station become part of the General Bartolomé Mitre Railway division of recently created Ferrocarriles Argentinos. In 1977 Sarratea station was closed, as almost all passenger services were eliminated. Like other stations of the former Ferrocarril Mitre, it is now maintained by freight rail company Nuevo Central Argentino (NCA).

=== Operators ===
Company	Period
(United Kingdom) BA & Rosario	1890–1908
(United Kingdom) Central Argentine	1908–1948
(Argentina) Ferrocarriles Argentinos	1948–1977
