= Laureano Forero Ochoa =

Colombian architect

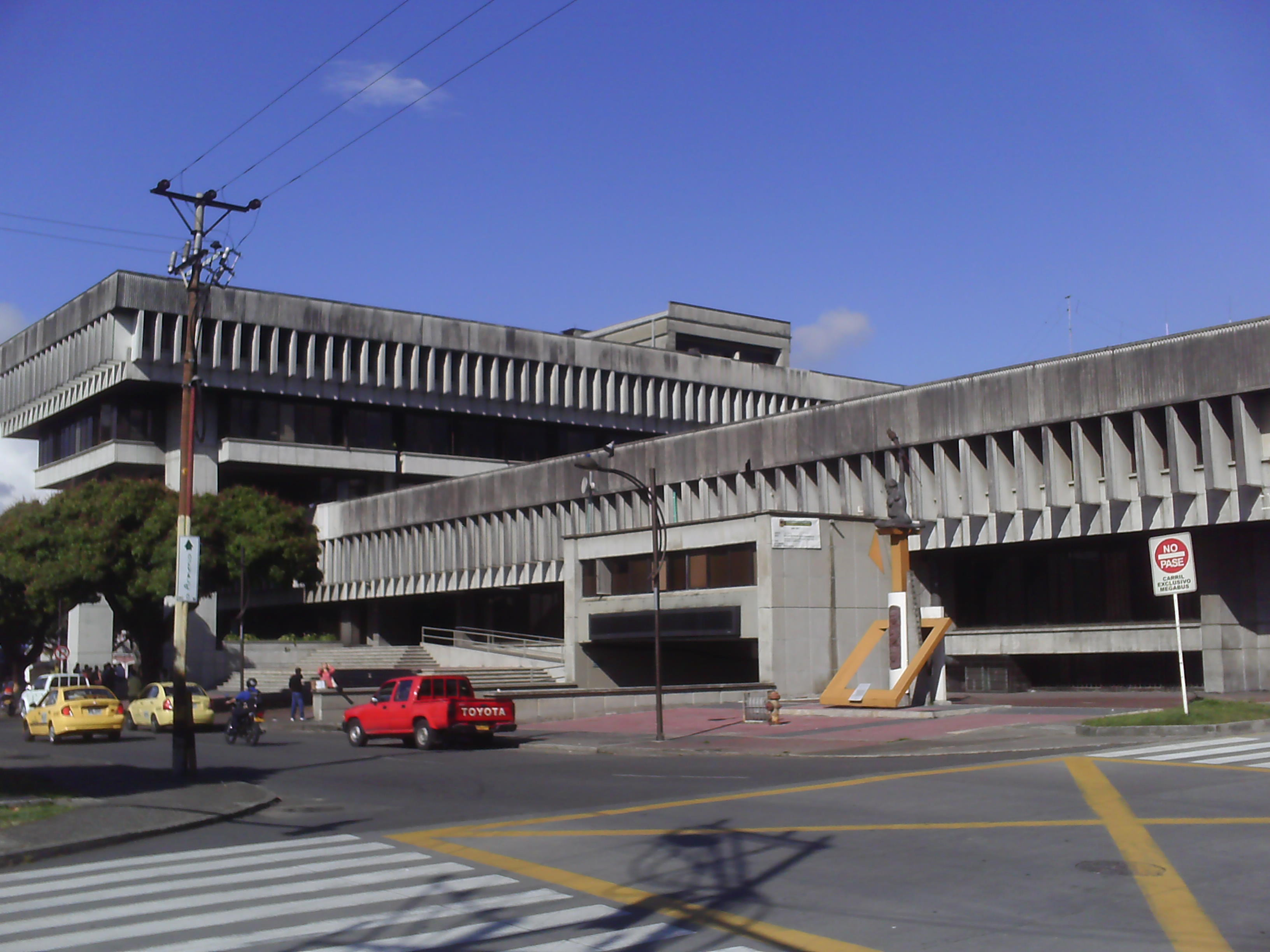
Gobernacion Risaralda

Laureano Forero Ochoa, referred to as Nano, is a Colombian (Paisa) architect. His work includes Centro de Capacitación Aranjuez (1993) in Medellín and Parque de Bolivar (1998) in Pereira, Risaralda. He also designed the chapel at the Campos de Paz cemetery in Medellín. The concrete building appears as a "literal stairway to heaven". He also designed the Miguel Angel Builes Ethnographical Museum (named for Miguel Angel Builes) (1975). His work is characterized by courtyards, high ceilings, color, large bright spaces, heterogeneity, and craftsmanship (artisan construction).

Forero graduated from the National University of Colombia, studied in Italy and at the Association School of Architecture in London. He worked with Gio Ponti doing architecture and landscaping in Baghdad and England. Then he came to the U.S. in 1970 and remained there until 1988 He won the National Architecture Award of Colombia (1983) and the Latin American Architecture Award (2009). He was included as one of the ten Latin American masters of architecture in an exhibition at the 4th Biennale of Architecture in São Paulo.

Forero calls Barefoot Park and the hills of Nutibara and El Volador his favorite places. He also likes the urban of Las comunas where the urban texture is precious, the tropical light on the walls, the shadows and light.

== Work ==
- Comfama of Arajuez building
- Restoration of La Carrera de Forero (Rosario Central Station) with Luis Grossman, in the city of Rosario, Buenos Aires, Argentina
- Casa La Zarzuela (1998) in Amaga, Antioquia, selected for the XVI Bienal de Arquitectura in 1998.
- Gobernación de Risaralda (1974) an imposing six-story building
- Casa Betania in the municipality of Retiro Antioquia, parcelación Juanito Laguna, Sector Represa de La Fe
