= Santa Fe Western Railway =

Argentine railway company

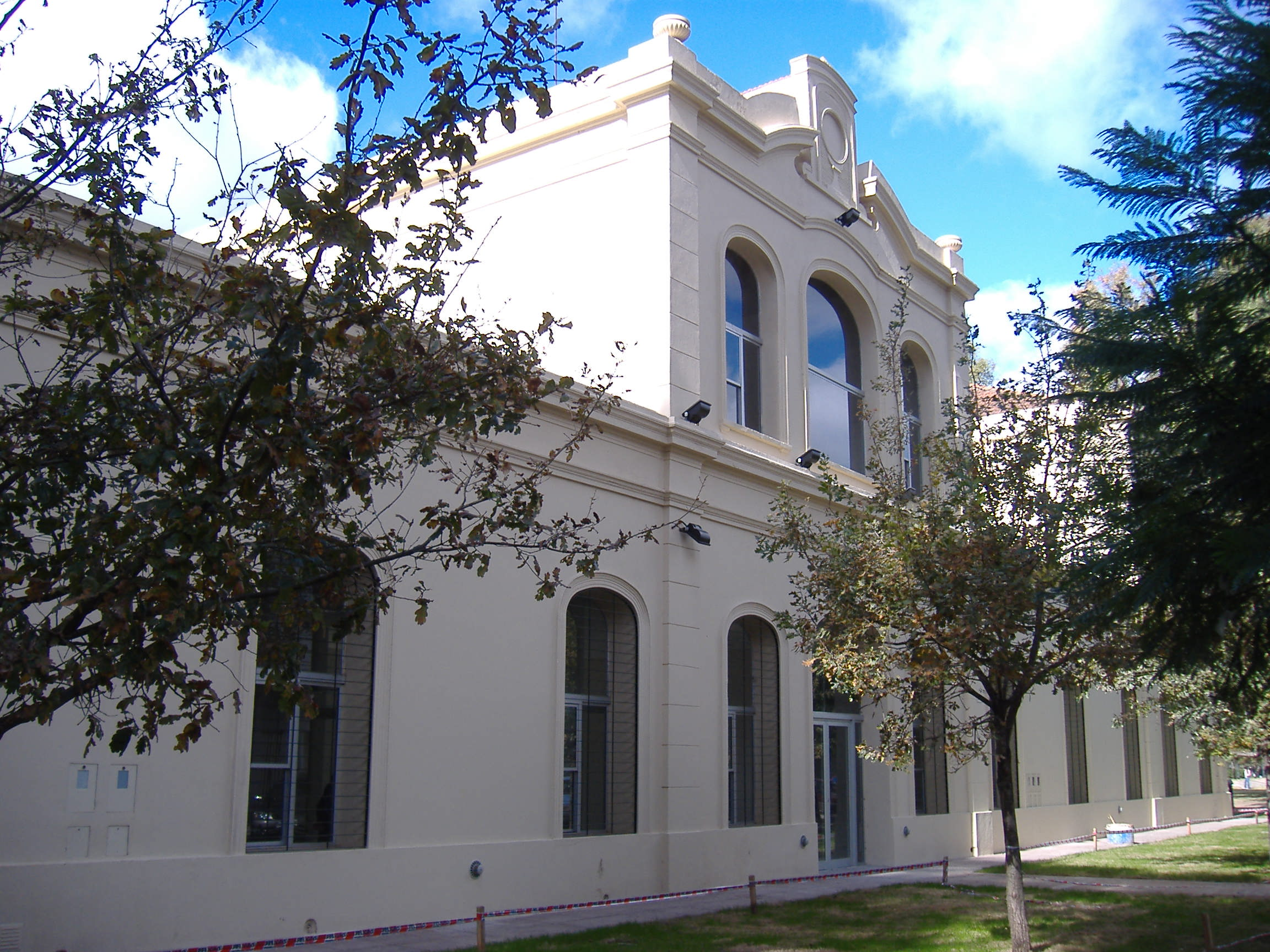
- Remains of the Rosario Oeste Santafesino station (Sep. 2006)

Overview
- Native name: Ferrocarril Oeste Santafesino
- Status: Defunct company; some lines active (freight transport)
- Locale: Santa Fe; Córdoba
- Termini: Rosario; Cruz Alta

Service
- Services: 1

History
- Opened: 1883
- Closed: 1900; 126 years ago

Technical
- Line length: 120 km (75 mi)
- Track gauge: 1,676 mm (5 ft 6 in)
Route map
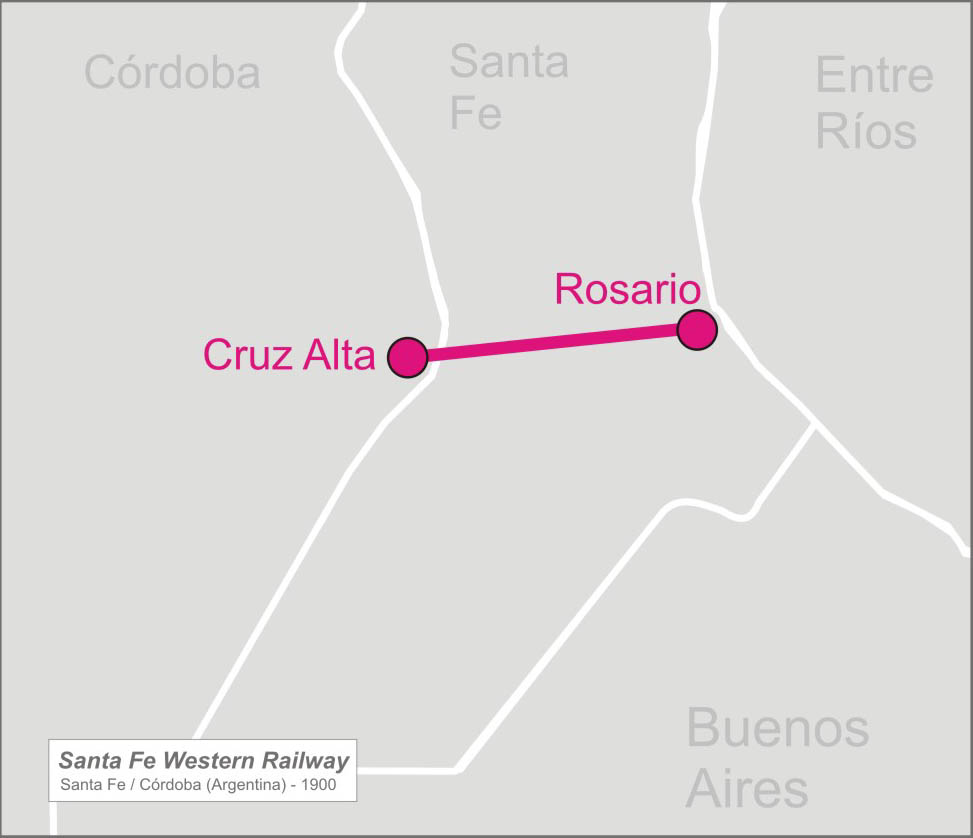

The Santa Fe Western Railway (SFW, native name: Ferrocarril Oeste Santafesino) was an Argentine railway company which became British-owned in 1900 when it was taken over by the Central Argentine Railway. The company was based in the south of the province of Santa Fe.

== History ==
The SFW was founded in 1883 by Carlos Casado del Alisal (the first president of the Provincial Bank of Santa Fe), with the goal of bringing the agricultural wealth of the region to the Port of Rosario on the Paraná River.

The terminus of this 5 ft 6 in (1,676 mm), broad gauge railway was (Rosario Oeste Santafesino Station), located in the southeast of the city of Rosario, within present-day Parque Urquiza. The line ran west along today's Pellegrini Avenue, and turned southwest along today's Godoy Avenue after Oroño Boulevard. It reached the town of Casilda, then known as "Colonia Candelaria". The railway was then extended towards the south of Córdoba Province, reaching Cruz Alta. A number of towns were founded on the way under the sponsorship of the company.

After the SFW was bought by Central Argentine, its passenger services were moved to Rosario Central Station, and Rosario O.S. was renamed "Rosario Este", dedicated exclusively to freight transport and cattle. A new railway was built, eliminating the rails that ran along the avenues.

Part of the line is currently run by private company Nuevo Central Argentino that operates freight services.
