= Barrio Belgrano =

Barrio Belgrano may refer to at least two neighbourhoods in Argentine cities:

- Barrio Belgrano, Rosario
- Belgrano, Buenos Aires
