= Patio Parada =

Coordinates: 32°55′57.04″S 60°40′41.36″W

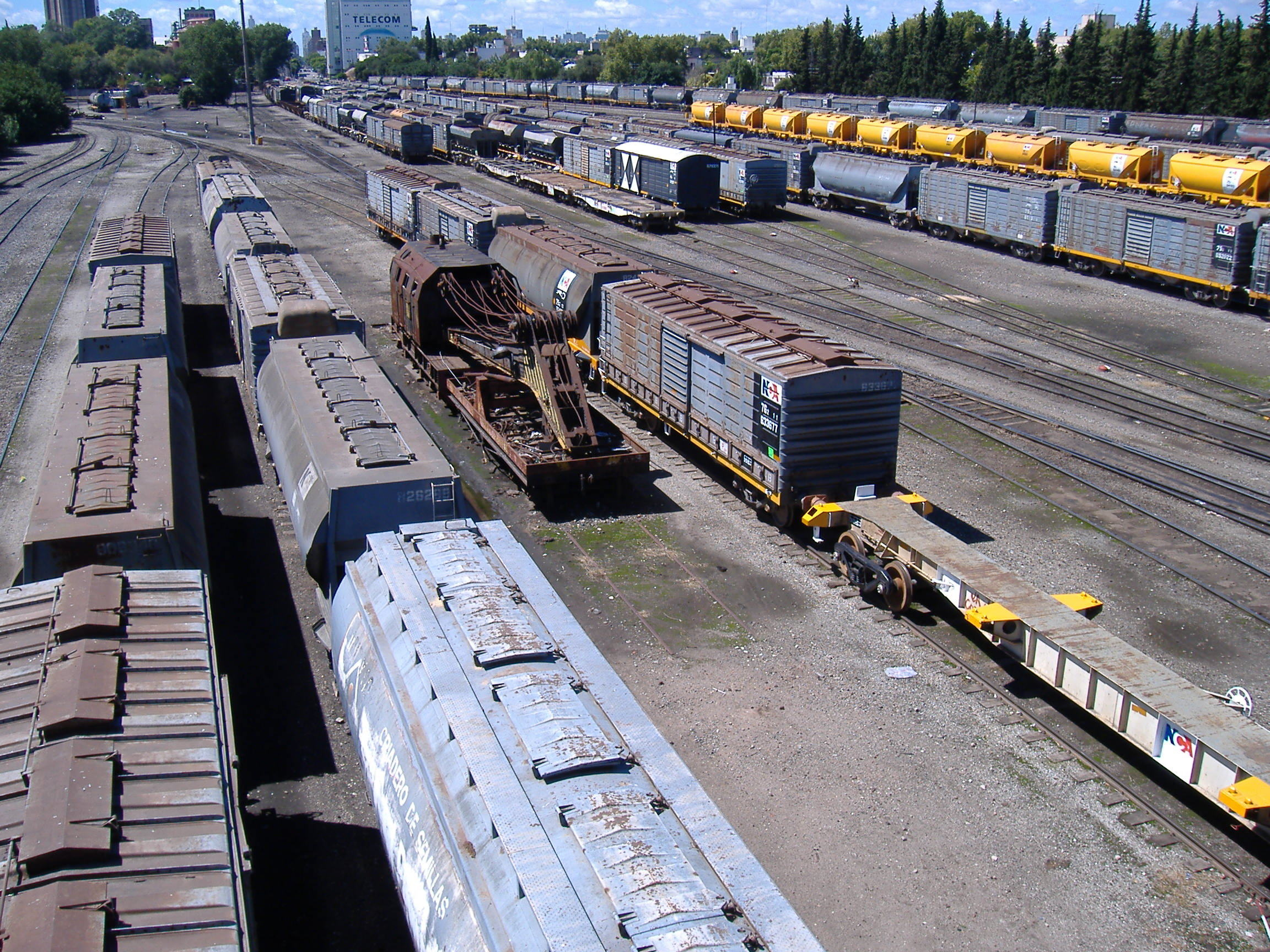
- Trains parked at Patio Parada, viewed from the Avellaneda Viaduct (facing east)

General information
- Location: Av. Bordabehere, Rosario; Argentina
- System: Rail yard
- Operator: Nuevo Central Argentino
Location

Patio Parada is a rail yard in Rosario, province of Santa Fe, Argentina. It is an important part of the railway system of the city and has been designed as the future site of a multi-modal public transport terminus. Formerly belonging to the Ferrocarril General Bartolomé Mitre company, it is now managed by the Nuevo Central Argentino (NCA) railway company. It employs a broad 5 ft 6 in (1676 mm) gauge railway.

== Overview ==
Patio Parada is located in the north of Rosario, just outside the central section of the city, along Bordabehere Avenue, from Alberdi Avenue westward. A street bridge (part of Avellaneda Boulevard) runs above it in the north–south direction. Its administration building lies on one end, at the Cruce Alberdi (Alberdi Crossing), beside the remains of the former Ludueña Station (or Alberdi Stop) and a few blocks from NCA's headquarters.

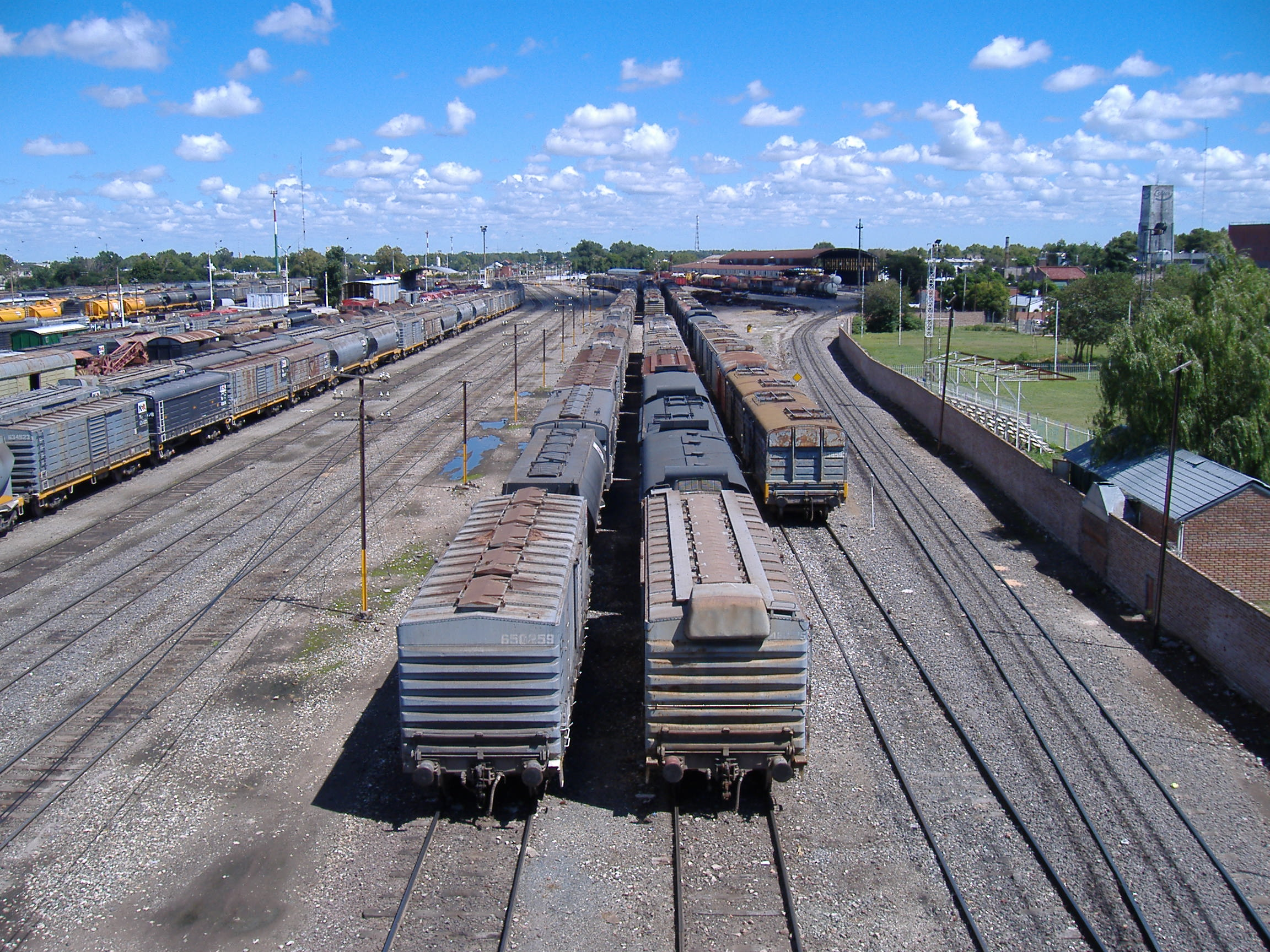
Another view of Patio Parada (facing west)

The railways that converge at Patio Parada are connected to Rosario Norte Station on the east. Towards the west, they divide in three branches: a north branch, which passes by the former Sarratea Station and exits Rosario towards the city of Santa Fe, reaching the city of Tucumán in the northwest of the country; a west branch, towards Fisherton, passing by the former Antártida Argentina Station and reaching the city of Córdoba almost 400 km away; and a southwest branch, that crosses Rosario in a diagonal, passing by the former Barrio Vila Station and the neighbouring city of Pérez, reaching Córdoba via Cruz Alta.

Patio Parada has been designated as the future site of a multi-modal public transport terminus serving Rosario and its metropolitan area. The official plans are contained in the Municipality's 2007–2017 Urban Plan. The site is to contain a small bus terminus, a stop of the projected Buenos Aires–Rosario–Córdoba high-speed train, and a tram distribution node, plus direct communication with Rosario International Airport.
