= Parque Urquiza (Rosario) =

Park in Rosario, Argentina

Coordinates: 32°57′30.41″S 60°37′23.61″W

The Parque Urquiza (Urquiza Park) is a public urban park in Rosario, Argentina. It is located in the southeastern end of the city center, on top of the Paraná River ravines. It is bordered by 3 de Febrero St., the coastal Belgrano Avenue, Chacabuco St. and the beginning of Pellegrini Avenue. Its name is a homage to General Justo José de Urquiza, President of the Argentine Confederation from 1854 to 1860.

The park hosts an open-air stage (the Humberto de Nito Municipal Amphitheater, with a 3,000-people capacity), the Municipal Astronomic Complex (comprising the Luis Cándido Carballo Planetarium, the Víctor Capolongo Observatory, and the Experimental Science Museum), a large bas-relief called The Sower, a monument to General Urquiza, and the former Rosario station of the Ferrocarril Oeste Santafesino, as well as a fountain, a number of sculptures, sports fields and recreation areas.

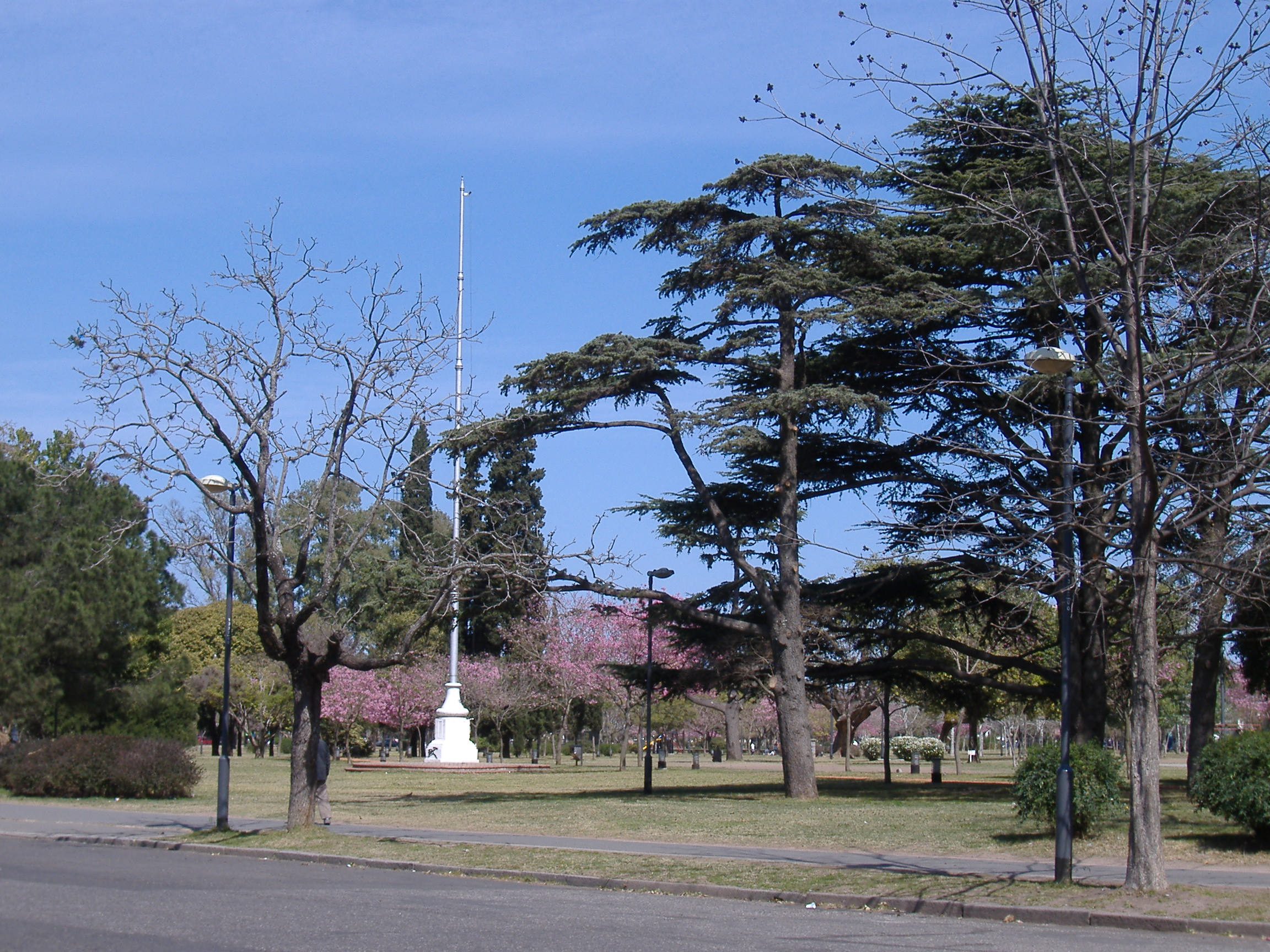
A view of the park

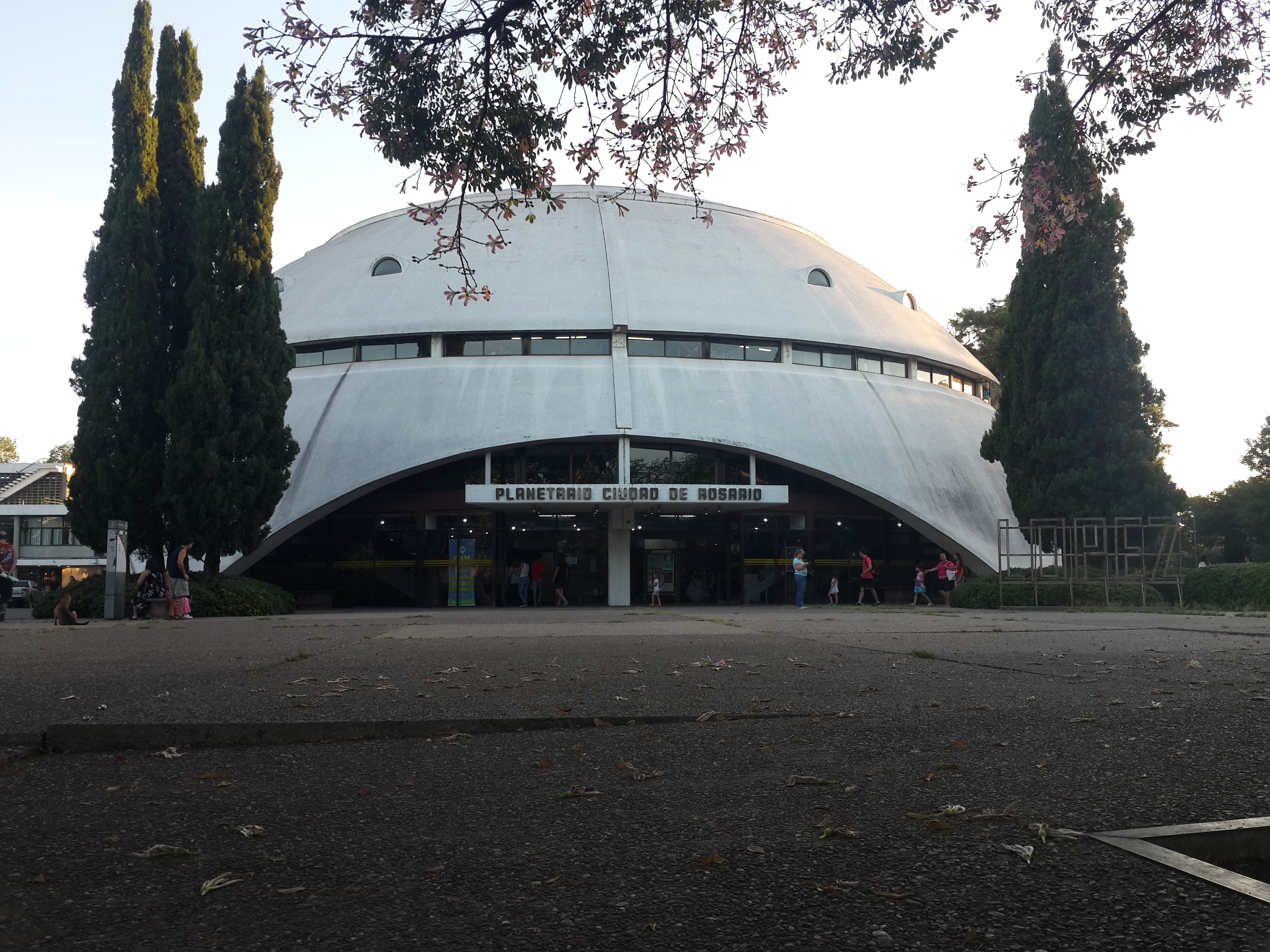
Planetarium
