= William Wheelwright =

American businessman (1798-1873)

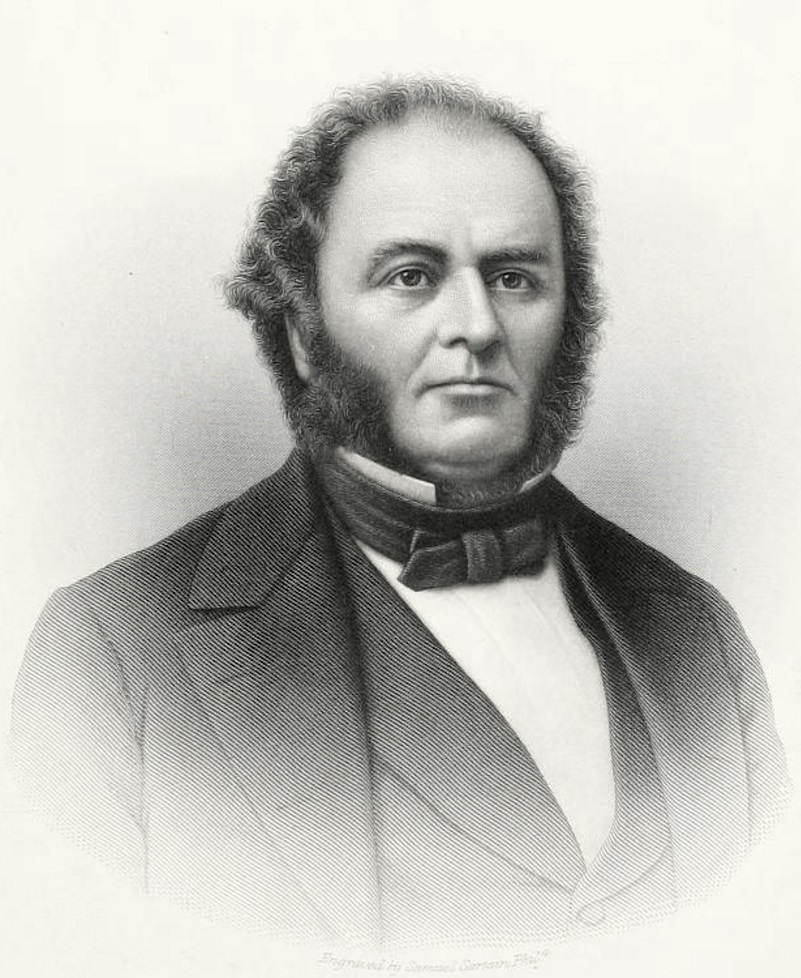
- Born: March 18, 1798; Merrimac, Massachusetts, US
- Died: September 26, 1873 (aged 75); London, England, UK
- Education: Andover Academy
- Occupation: Businessman
- Known for: Steamboats and trains in Chile; Central Argentine Railway in Argentina
- Spouse: Martha Gerrish
- Parents: Ebenezer Wheelwright (father); Anna Coombs (mother)

William Wheelwright (March 18, 1798 – September 26, 1873) was an Anglo-American businessman who played an essential role in the development of steamboat and train transportation in Chile and other parts of South America. In 1838, with help from the Chilean government, he founded the Pacific Steam Navigation Company which commenced operations on October 15, 1840, and provided commercial sea access to cities such as Valparaíso and El Callao.

Wheelwright also owned the Central Argentine Railway, a company established in 1863 that built and operated railway lines in the east-central region of Argentina.

== Biography ==
William Wheelwright, son of Ebenezer and Anna (Coombs) Wheelwright, was born in Newburyport, Massachusetts on March 16, 1798. Wheelwright lived in a house on High Street and attended public school until he was about twelve years of age, when he was sent to Andover Academy, where he completed his education.

Wheelwright's father was a shipmaster in early life, William soon manifested a desire to pursue the same vocation. He shipped as cabin boy on board a vessel bound to the West Indies and during the next two or three years he rose rapidly to the rank of captain in 1817, when he was only nineteen years of age.

In 1823, he was in command of the ship Rising Empire, owned by William Bartlett, when the vessel was wrecked off the coast of South America, near the mouth of the Río de La Plata. The captain and crew reached shore in safety after twenty-four hours' exposure in an open boat. One man was lost.

On his arrival at Buenos Aires, Wheelwright obtained a position as supercargo of a vessel about to sail for Valparaíso. The voyage took four or five months to complete using the route around Cape Horn. Interested in studying the business opportunities on the west coast of South America, he traveled to Guayaquil, the seaport of Ecuador, where he decided to remain. In 1825, he was appointed United States consul at that port. Three years later, he left his business in the hands of his partner and returned to his home in Newburyport via the Isthmus of Panama. He had been absent six years.

He married Martha Gerrish of Newburyport on February 10, 1829, and returned with her to Guayaquil. Wheelwright discovered that nearly all his property had been lost during his absence, through the negligence and mismanagement of his partner. He decided to return to Valparaíso, and bought a small vessel, which he named Fourth of July, which he put to work transporting specie and bullion from port to port along the coast.

== Steamship line ==
In 1835, he commenced the great task of establishing a line of steamers between the republics of Peru and Chile and Europe. He went to England in 1837 to raise funds, and in 1838 the Pacific Steam Navigation Company was formed with a capital of £250,000. Two steamers, each of seven hundred tons register, were built in 1840 and ordered to proceed through the straits of Magellan to the ports of Valparaíso and Callao.

After the arrival of these steamers on the Pacific coast Wheelwright discovered the difficulty of procuring coal and the impossibility of providing for unexpected repairs. These obstacles were surmounted, and steam communication was established with Europe.

== Railroads ==
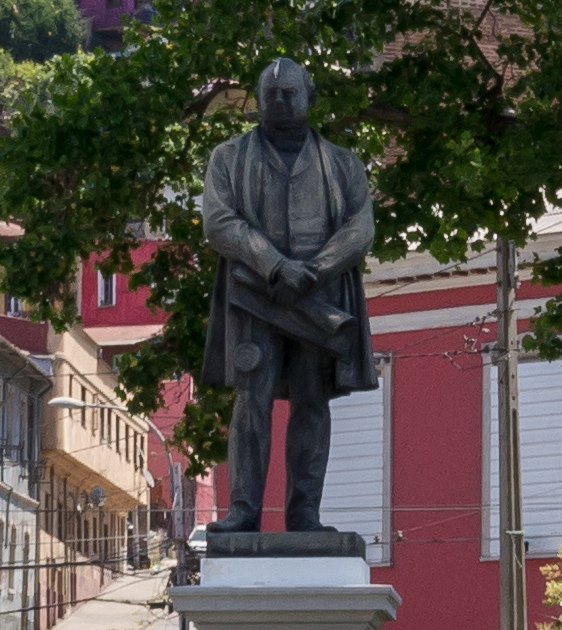
Monument to William Wheelwright in Valparaíso

Wheelwright built the first South American railroad from Caldera to Copiapó, and extended it nearly 40 miles into the interior of Chile.

In 1841, he became interested in a plan to unite Valparaíso and Buenos Aires by rail over the mountain range that separates Chile from Argentina. The survey work was completed in 1859; but the Chilean government considered the difficulties too great to be successfully overcome, and the enterprise was abandoned.

Wheelwright later moved to Argentina, where he built the Central Argentine Railway that joined the cities of Córdoba and Rosario. The company had been established in London, signing a contract with the Ministry of Interior, Guillermo Rawson, in 1863.

The contract included a term stating the company (CAR) had the exclusive rights to construct a railway to the Andes. Nevertheless, the CAR never built the line due to the high costs. The company was also granted a minimum profit (that was considerably higher than incomes earned by European railway companies).

Wheelwright died in London in September 1873. A small town in Santa Fe Province of Argentina was named after him, Wheelwright, Santa Fe.
