= Henry Herbert Loveday =

British railway executive (1864–1913)

- Born: 1864
- Died: 1913 (aged 48–49)
- Occupation: Railway executive

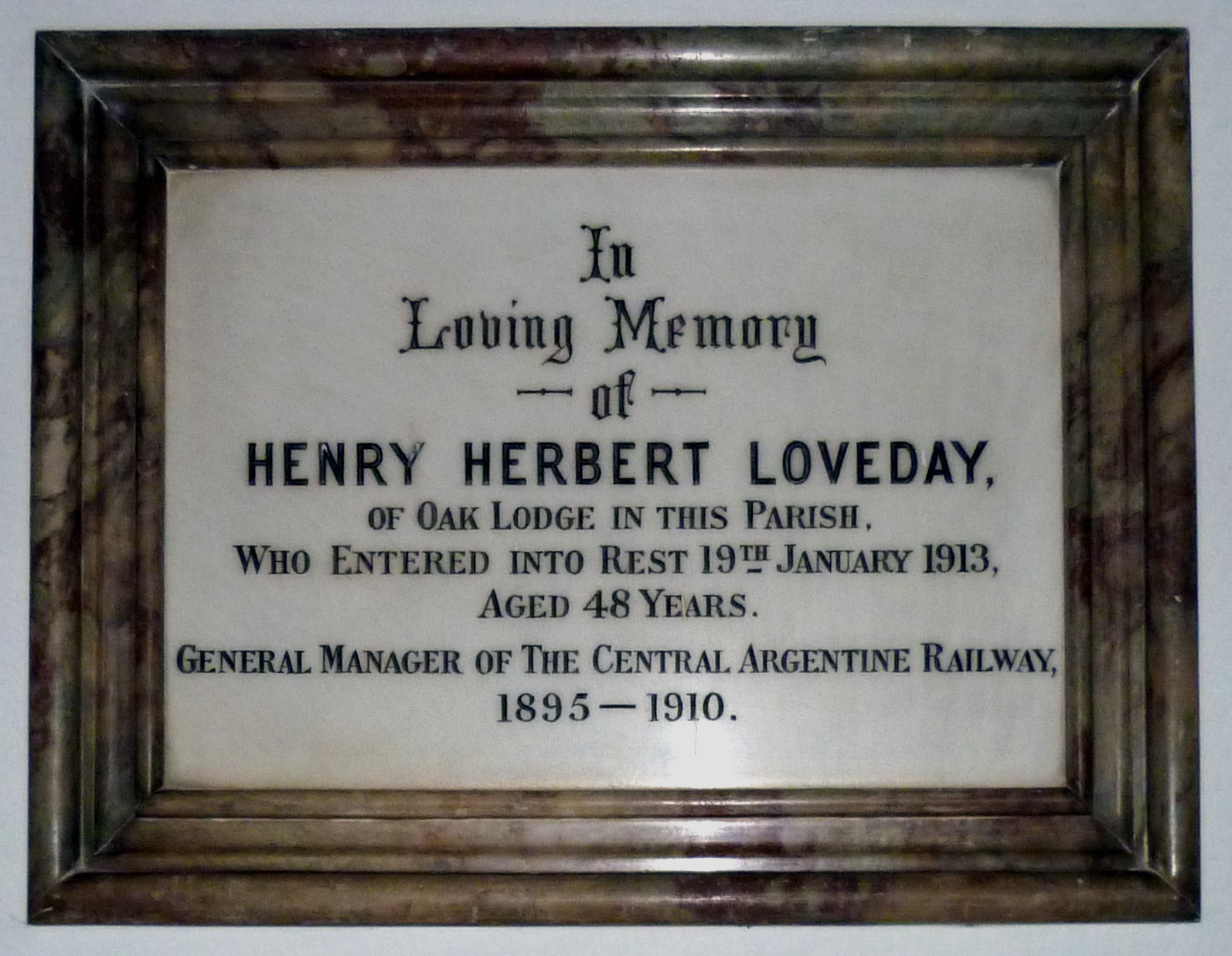
Henry Herbert Loveday plaque

Henry Herbert Loveday (20 May 1864 – 19 January 1913) was a British railway executive who was general manager of the Central Argentine Railway from 1895 to 1910. His father, also Henry Herbert, was a chief inspector of the Midland Railway Company in Derby, England, who in 1877 gave evidence in court for the prosecution relating to the theft of the company's property.

Loveday died on 19 January 1913 at his home of Oak Lodge, Totteridge Common, London. He is remembered on a memorial plaque at St Andrew's Church, Totteridge.
