= Barrio Belgrano, Rosario =

Neighborhood in the west Rosario, Argentina

Belgrano
- Neighbourhood
- Interactive map of Belgrano
- Coordinates: 32°56′S 60°43′W
- Country: Argentina
- Province: Santa Fe
- Department: Rosario
- City & Municipality: Rosario
- Established: 1889; 137 years ago

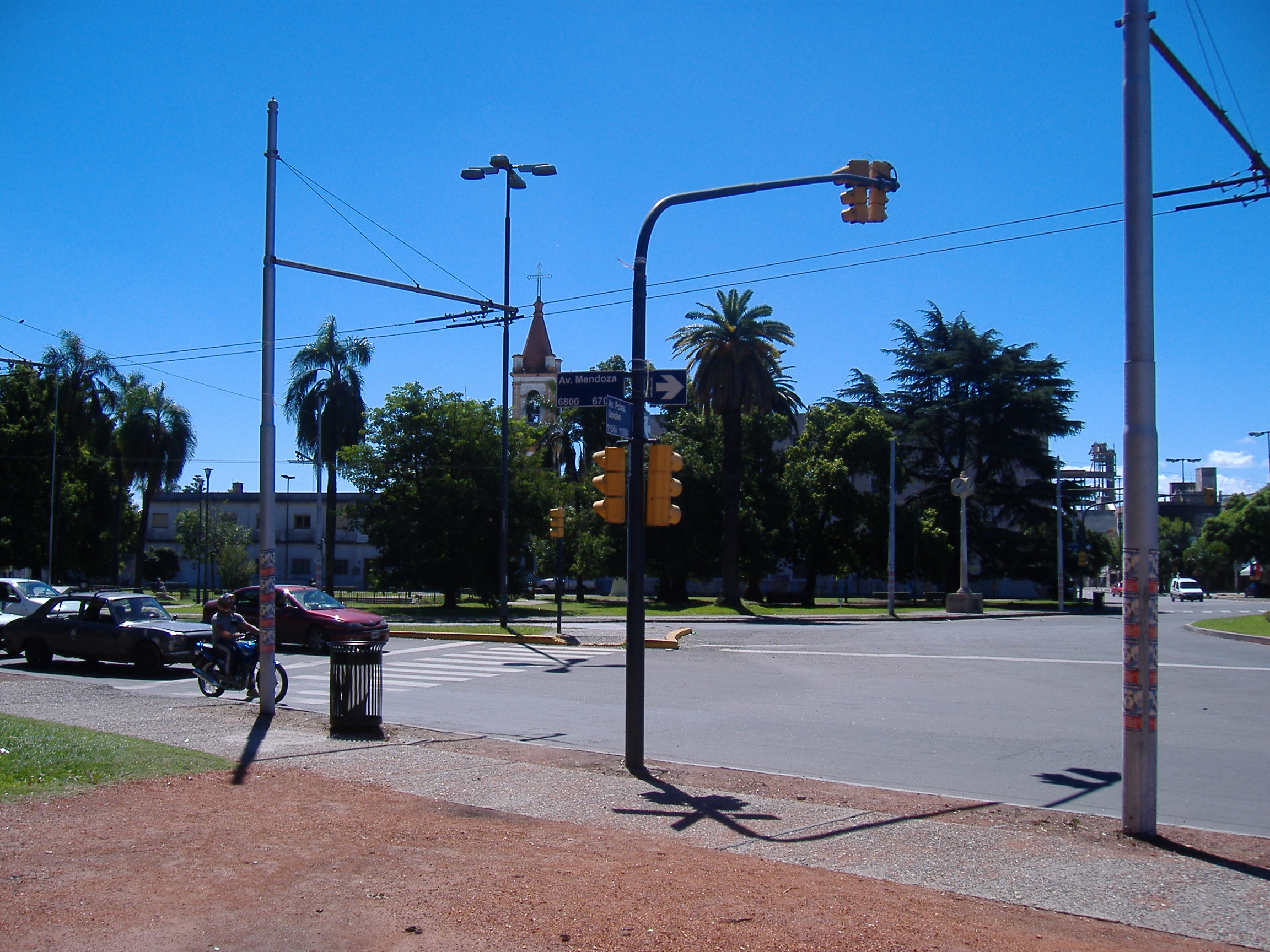
The intersection of Mendoza & Provincias Unidas Avenue.

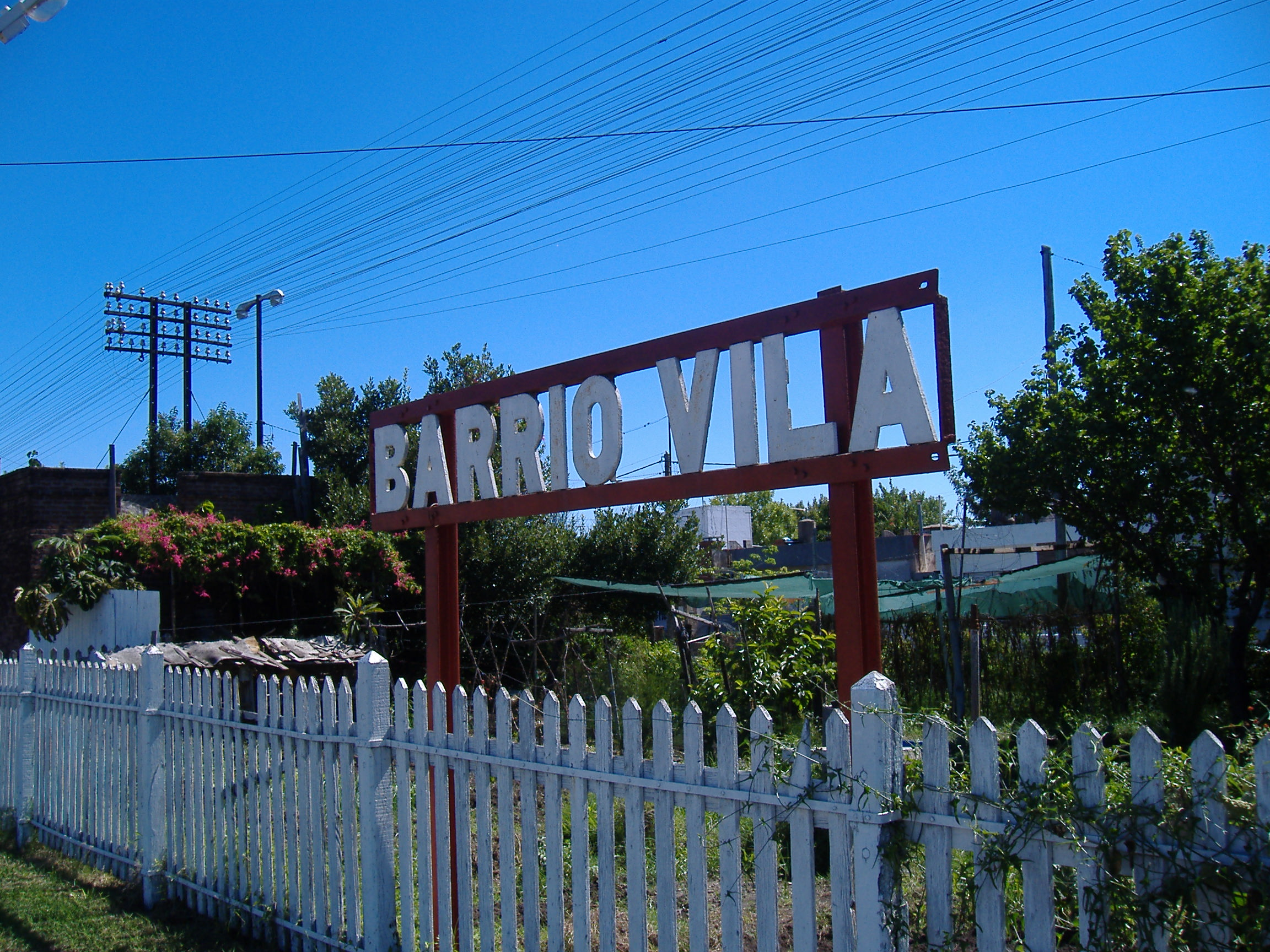
A sign showing the old name of the neighborhood.

Belgrano is a barrio (neighborhood) in Rosario, Argentina, located in the west of the city. It is named in honor of Manuel Belgrano, creator of the Argentine flag.

The center of Barrio Belgrano is the intersection of Provincias Unidas Avenue and Mendoza Avenue. The Bartolomé Mitre Park, popularly known as Las Cuatro Plazas (The Four Squares), is located there, occupying the four corners. At the end of the 19th century it was the location of a town known as Eloy Palacios, first settled by farmers in 1889. It was then also known as Barrio Vila.

The old Barrio Vila train station, built in 1891 by the Ferrocarril Central Argentino, has been preserved, though it is now mostly inactive. Near the Cuatro Plazas lies the Church of Saint Anthony of Padua, also built in 1891, and next to it the parochial College of the Immaculate Conception (1903). In the south of the barrio, on Provincias Unidas Avenue, lies the La Piedad Cemetery.
