= Antártida Argentina railway station =

Railway station in Rosario, Argentina

Coordinates: 32°55′34.4279″S 60°44′20.4143″W

Antártida Argentina
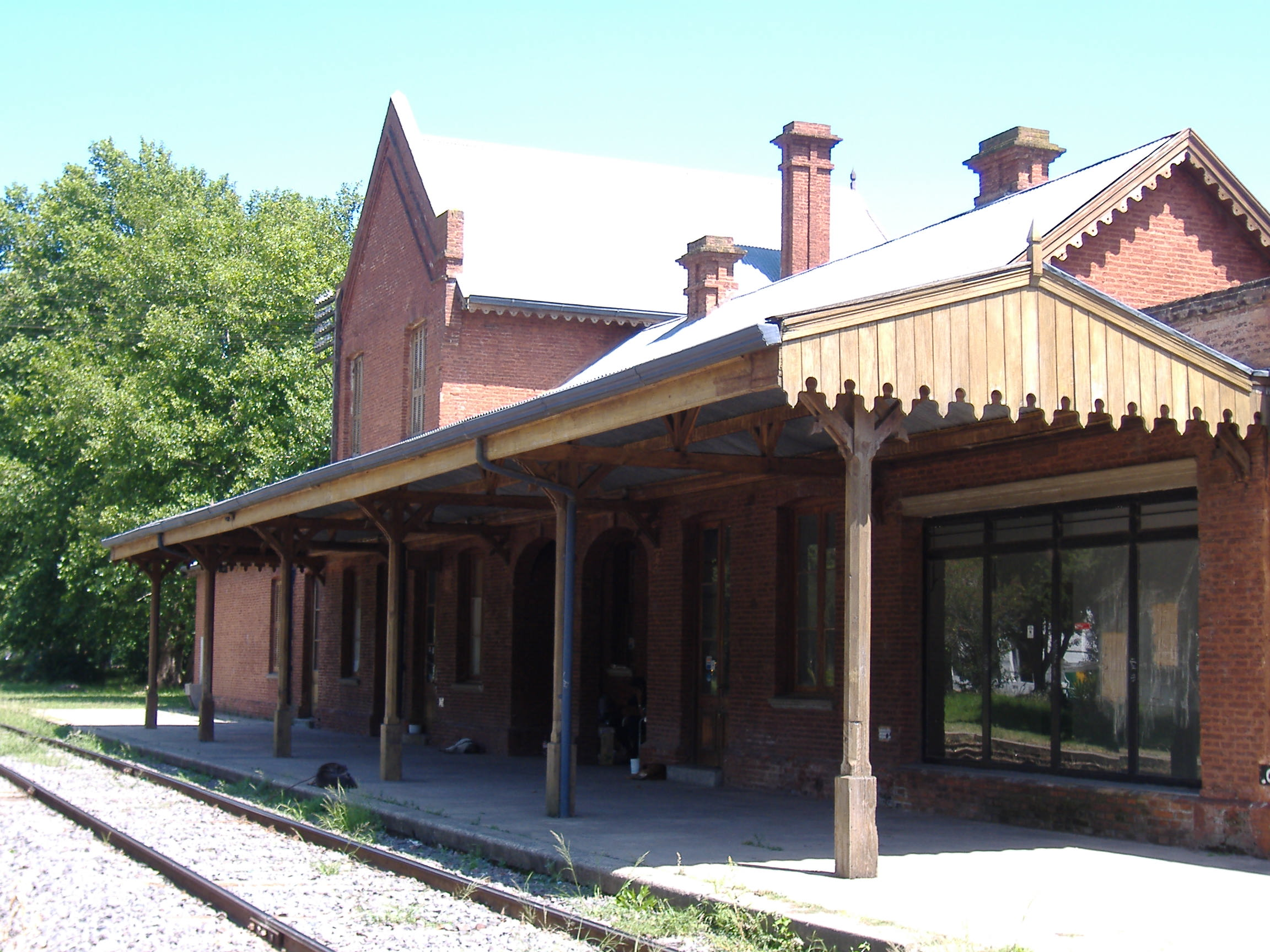
- The station pictured in 2006

General information
- Location: Av. Morrison and Wilde, Rosario; Argentina
- System: Inter-city
- Owner: Government of Argentina
- Operator: Trenes Argentinos (passengers); NCA (freight)
- Line: Mitre

History
- Opened: 1890
- Closed: 1977; 49 years ago (reopened in 2022)
Location

Antártida Argentina (English: Argentine Antarctica) is a railway station located in Rosario, Santa Fe, Argentina, in the western neighbourhood of Fisherton (intersection of Morrison Avenue and Wilde St.). It is currently operated by state-owned Trenes Argentinos (for passenger services) and private Nuevo Central Argentino (freight transport).

After railway services were cancelled, the station building served as cultural centre dependent on the Municipality of Rosario. Nevertheless, in July 2022 the station was reopened after Trenes Argentinos extended services from Rosario Norte to Cañada de Gómez station.

== History ==
The railroad and the station, then known as Fisherton Station, were built by British-owned company Central Argentine Railway at the beginning of the 1890s. The neighbourhood, originally built to house the company's workers, grew around the station.

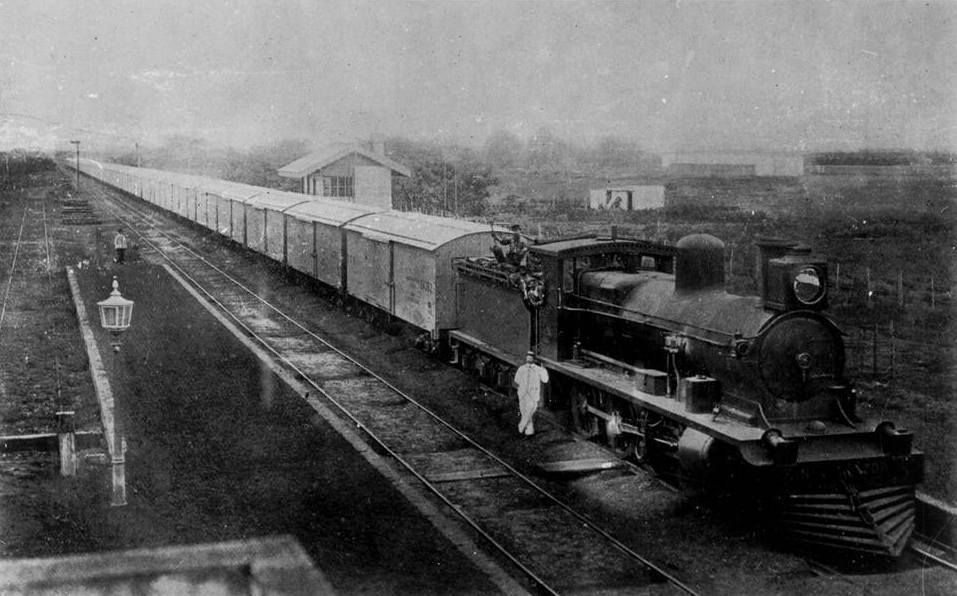
The station with a freight train stopped, c. 1909-12

The station was an intermediate stop of the line that started at Rosario Central Station. The trip from this terminus to Fisherton took no more than 15 minutes (a comparable bus trip at present may take 45 minutes). After leaving Fisherton, in the periphery of Rosario's urban area, the line served towns west of the city and reached the city of Córdoba. Around 1935–1940, immediately after the "golden age" of Argentine railways, the station managed around 100,000 passengers a year.

In 1948 the government of Juan Perón nationalised the Argentine railway network and fused several companies. After Central Córdoba Railway became part of Ferrocarril Mitre network, the station was renamed as "Antártida Argentina" (Argentine Antarctica), and was left under the control of the State-owned company Ferrocarriles Argentinos, that managed all the railway lines after nationalisation.

In 1977 most passenger train services of Argentina were eliminated, and Antártida Argentina station was closed as well. The building was left largely abandoned.

The station was restored in the 1990s, though it underwent modifications that have been criticized (e.g. the removal of a protective layer of brick, which may greatly reduce the durability of the building).

The facilities were left in charge of the Nuevo Central Argentino (NCA), a private company that took over freight services on Mitre Railway tracks. Nevertheless, the NCA lent the station to the Municipality of Rosario to host several cultural activities for the neighbors.

After several years Antártida Argentina was reopened as railway station for passenger services in July 2022 after Trenes Argentinos extended services from Rosario Norte to Cañada de Gómez station.

=== Operators ===
Company	Period
(United Kingdom) Central Argentine	1890–1948
(Argentina) Ferrocarriles Argentinos	1948–1977
(Argentina) Nuevo Central Argentino (Note: Freight services only, the station does not have passenger trains since 1977.)	1993–present
(Argentina) Trenes Argentinos (Note: Passenger services.)	2022–present
