= Rosario Oeste Santafesino railway station =

Former railway station in Rosaria, Argentina

Coordinates: 32°57′22.61″S 60°37′27.29″W

Rosario (Santa Fe Western)
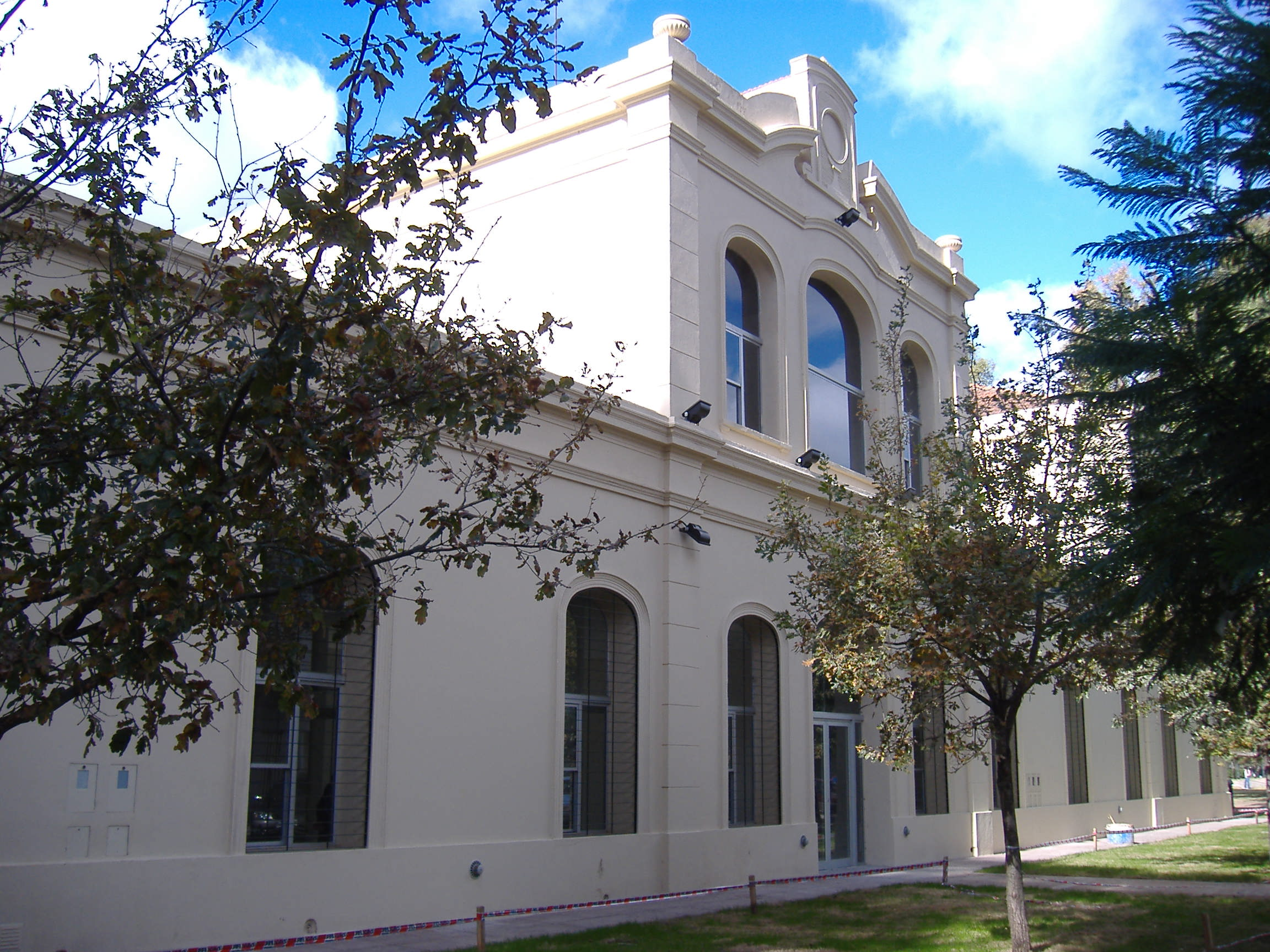
- Façade of the station after its restoration (2007).

General information
- Location: Chacabuco and 9 de Julio, Rosario; Argentina
- System: Regional rail
- Owner: Municipality of Rosario
- Operator: Central Argentine Railway

History
- Opened: 1883
- Closed: 1900; 126 years ago
Location

Rosario (Oeste Santafesino; in English: Santa Fe Western) is a former railway station and the terminus of the Santa Fe Western Railway company in Rosario, province of Santa Fe, Argentina.

The station is located in the southeast of Rosario (southern Santa Fe), within the present-day Parque Urquiza, at the junction of Chacabuco St. and 9 de Julio St., not far from the ravine of the Paraná River.

== History ==
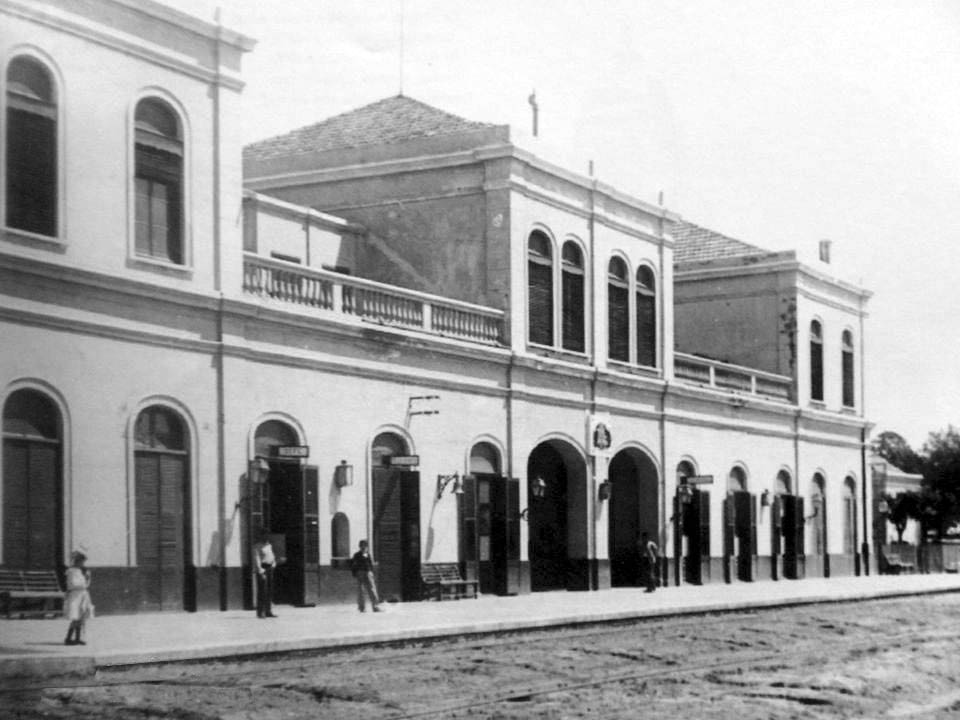
The station in 1883

The station was built in 1883 by the Santa Fe Western Railway. When the Central Argentine Railway company bought SFWR in 1900, the terminus was renamed "Rosario Este," designated to handle cargo and cattle exclusively.

As Argentina's railway system declined, the rails were removed, and the terminus, like many other stations, was abandoned and deteriorated. The Municipality of Rosario took charge of it and preserved what was left. Its long-delayed restoration was concluded in May 2007. The Municipality converted the building into a cultural center, housing the video library of the Rosario Audiovisual Center (Centro Audiovisual Rosario, CAR). The old station also serves as a community center for senior citizens and a meeting place for a group of sculptors. The offices of the Municipal Culture Secretariat will also be moved here, and an auditorium will be established for public activities and film projection.
