= Barrio Vila railway station =

Railway station in Rosario, Argentina

Barrio Vila
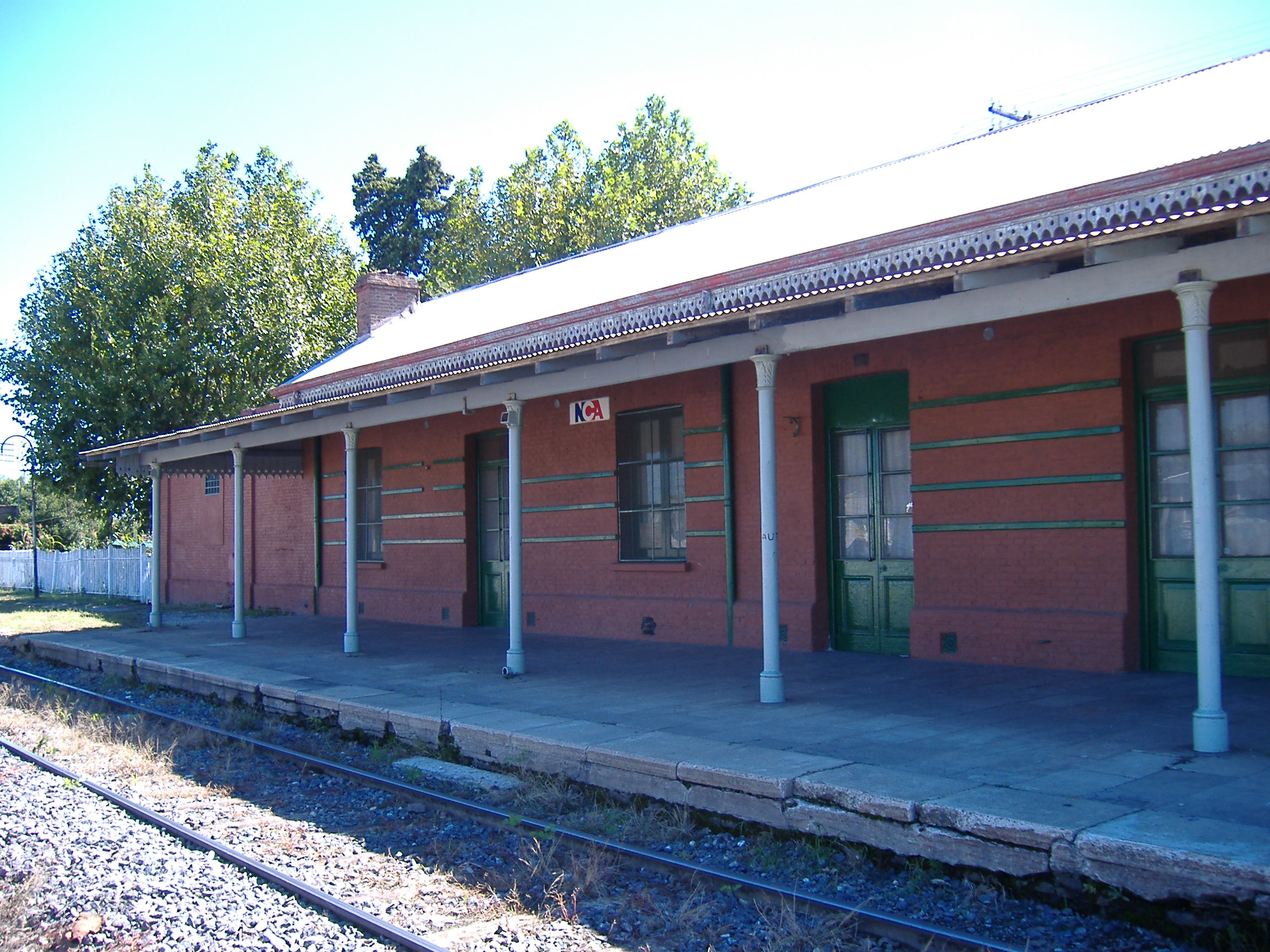
- Station building and platform (2006).

General information
- Location: Rosario; Argentina
- Coordinates: 32°56′29.26″S 60°42′27.79″W
- System: Inter-city
- Owner: Government of Argentina
- Operator: Central Argentine Railway (1891–1948); Ferrocarriles Argentinos (1948–1977)
- Line: Mitre

History
- Opened: April 1891
- Closed: 1977; 49 years ago
Location

Barrio Vila is a former train station in Rosario, Santa Fe, Argentina. It is located in the west of the city, in the neighbourhood of Belgrano. Private company Nuevo Central Argentino which runs freight trains on the line, but the station does not have operation since its closure in 1977.

== History ==
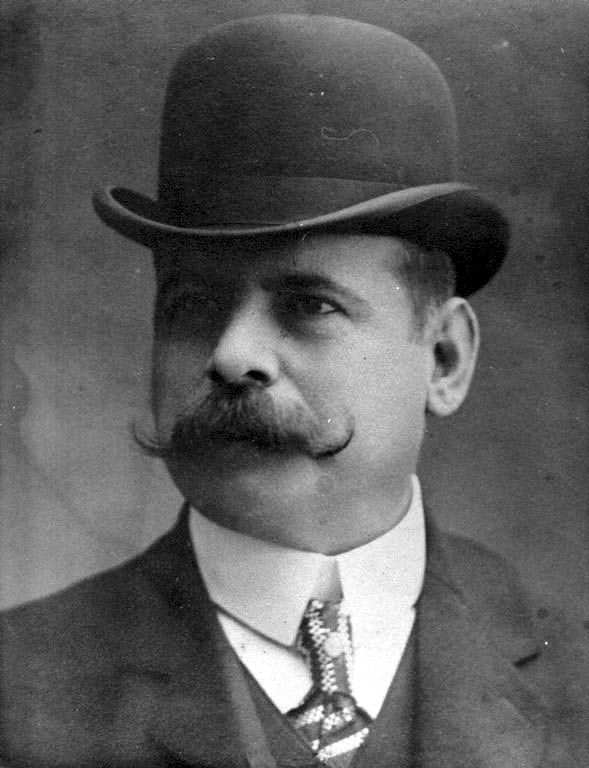
Nicasio Vila.

The station was opened in April 1891 in the Eloy Palacios town by British-owned Central Argentine Railway, as part of the line from Ludueña (Rosario) to Peyrano (at the border with Buenos Aires Province). The town had been founded by Nicasio Vila, an entrepreneur owner of "Compañía de Tramways del Oeste", a horse tramway company. The tramway company built the line from Rosario with Eloy Palacios.

In 1906, the municipality of Rosario changed the town's name to "Barrio Vila", the same than the railway station built by the Central Argentine.

After the railway nationalization in 1949, the station was managed by the General Bartolomé Mitre Railway division of Ferrocarriles Argentinos.

In 1977 Barrio Vila station was closed, as almost all passenger services were eliminated. Freight company Nuevo Central Argentino runs services on the line.

=== Historic operators ===
Company	Period
(United Kingdom) Central Argentine	1891–1948
(Argentina) Ferrocarriles Argentinos	1948–1977
