= Central Argentine Railway =

Former British railway company in Argentina (1863–1948)

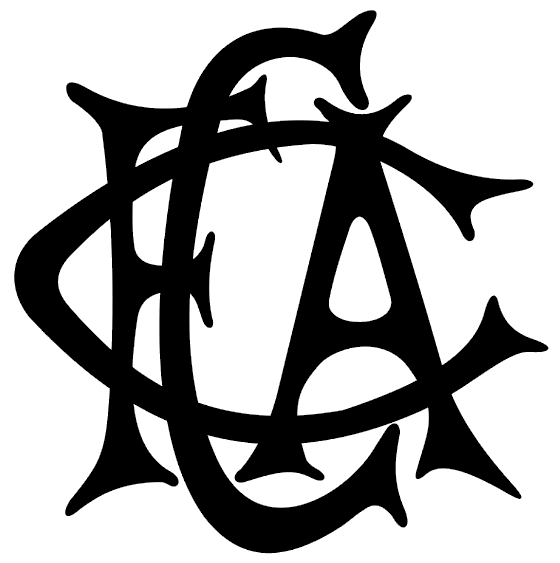

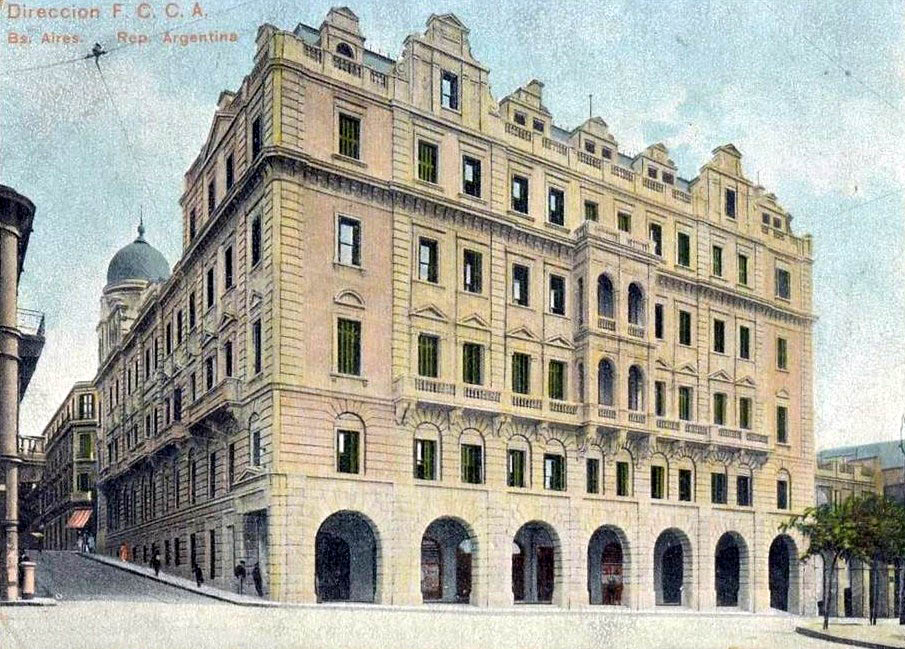
- FCCA headquarters in Buenos Aires, c.1900
- Native name: Ferrocarril Central Argentino
- Type: Private
- Industry: Transport
- Predecessor: Buenos Aires Northern; Santa Fe Western; Buenos Aires & Rosario
- Founded: 1863
- Defunct: 1948; 78 years ago
- Fate: Acquired and nationalised by the Government of Argentina in 1948, becoming F.C. Mitre
- Successor: Ferrocarriles Argentinos
- Headquarters: Buenos Aires, Argentina
- Area served: Center and North of Argentina
- Key people: Henry Herbert Loveday (General Manager)
- Services: Rail transport
- Owner: William Wheelwright

Central Argentine Railway

Overview
- Native name: Ferrocarril Central Argentino
- Locale: Argentina
- Termini: Retiro; Tucumán
- Stations: Rosario Central (Note: Original terminus.); Rosario Norte (Note: Added to CAR when the company acquired the Buenos Aires and Rosario Railway in 1908.); Córdoba; Santiago del Estero

History
- Opened: 1863; 163 years ago
- Closed: 1948; 78 years ago

Technical
- Track gauge: 1,676 mm (5 ft 6 in)

The Central Argentine Railway (CA, Spanish: Ferrocarril Central Argentino) was one of the Big Four broad gauge, 5 ft 6 in (1,676 mm) British companies that built and operated railway networks in Argentina. The company was established in the 19th century, to serve the provinces of Santa Fe and Córdoba, in the east-central region of the country. It later extended its operations to Buenos Aires, Tucumán, and Santiago del Estero. The railway had a complicated relationship with its employees in the 1910s, and then it had a complicated relationship with the government of Argentina in the 1920s.

== History ==
=== Origins ===
In 1854, American engineer Allan Campbell sent a proposal to members of the government of the Argentine Confederation. Campbell wanted a study to be done on the construction of a possible railway line between cities of Rosario and Córdoba. The distance estimated was 247 mi (about 398 km) and the costs were in Argentine pesos (£1 = Arg$5). The study that had been done on the CAR revealed a cost of 4,000 sterling per mile built.

The costs estimated by Campbell in the report were the following:

Description	Cost (Arg$)
Excavations, ditches	656,000
Bridges, gutters	153,000
Paths, tracks	2,673,000
Machines and rolling stock	350,000
Stations	280,000
Administration, managing, engineers, fees	300,000
Dock of Rosario	40,000
Lands	0
Workers, rooms, freight	70,000
Reserve percentage (10%)	452,200
Total amount	4,974,200

In 1855, the CA was given permission to begin work on a railway line from Rosario to Córdoba. Another American, William Wheelwright, who had been involved in the Copiapó–Caldera line project in Chile, financed and supported the construction of the railroad.

=== Construction ===
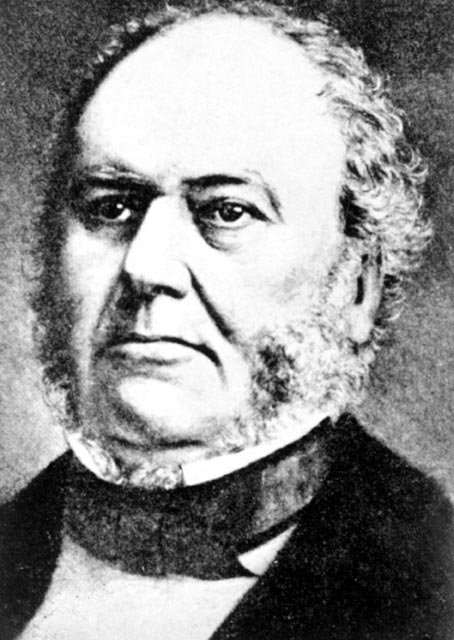
William Wheelwright, owner of the company

In 1863, the government of Argentina granted the company, led by engineer William Wheelwright, a concession to build and operate a railway line between the cities of Rosario (a major port in southern Santa Fe, on the Paraná River) and Córdoba (a large city near the geographical center of Argentina, and the capital of the province of the same name). The grant included a clause to populate the lands along and around the railway that were given to the company by the national state.

The construction of the railroad began in 1863 with the establishment of the terminus in Rosario, at the Rosario Central station. The line was built as a 1,676 mm (5 ft 6 in) broad gauge railway. In 1867 the line reached Villa María, Córdoba. Minister Rawson expressed disagreement for the paralysis of the works while passengers also protested against poor conditions of the service. The works for the Rosario Central station and other intermediate stations had not begun. The company alleged that they could not continue the extension of the line until the pending lands were given.

In September 1867, the government authorized a new disbursement of $1,500,000 to conclude the pending works. In 1870, the railway reached the city of Córdoba, and this completed its original route. According to political scientist Luis Schenoni, the Paraguayan War set Argentina on a self-reinforcing trajectory of railway expansion; President Domingo Faustino Sarmiento inaugurated the Córdoba-Rosario line on 18 April1870. The CA was the longest railway system at that time and the first to join two provinces. For 18 years the company did not build any tracks elsewhere; in 1888, the railway system still had 247 mi (about 398 km) of extension.

=== Progress ===
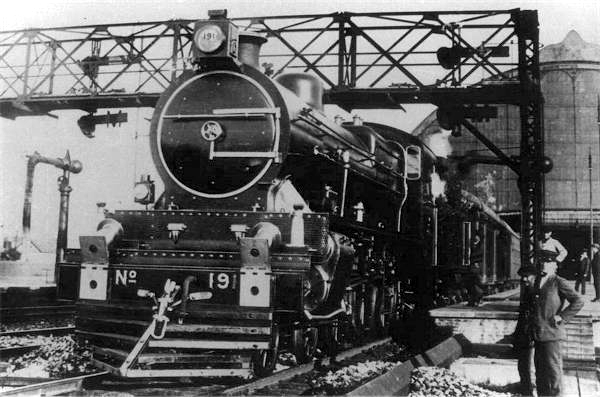
Famous "191" steam locomotive in Retiro

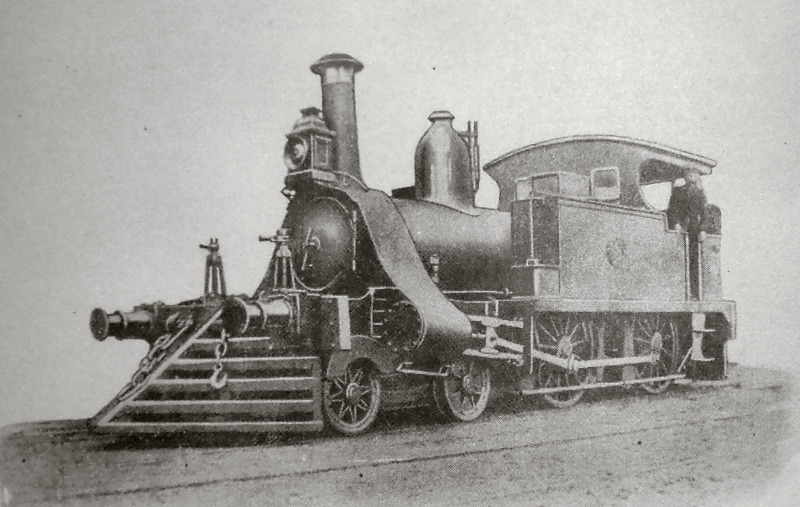
Locomotive that ran the Rosario-Cañada de Gómez branch in 1866

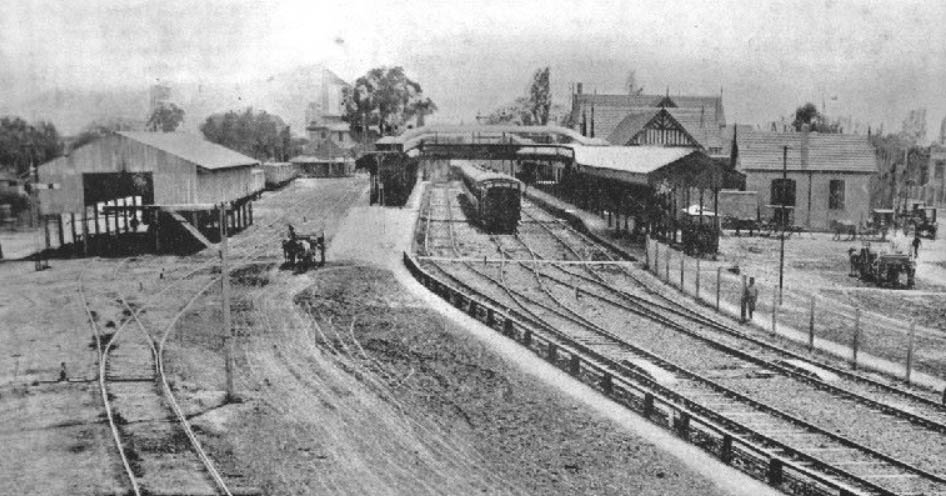
Tigre station, terminus (c. 1900)

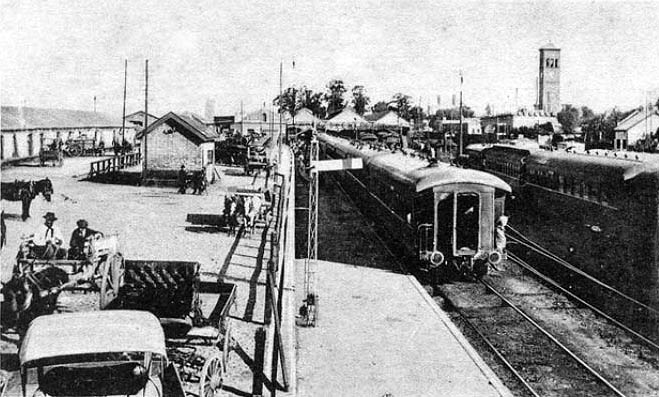
Rosario Central station, c. 1910

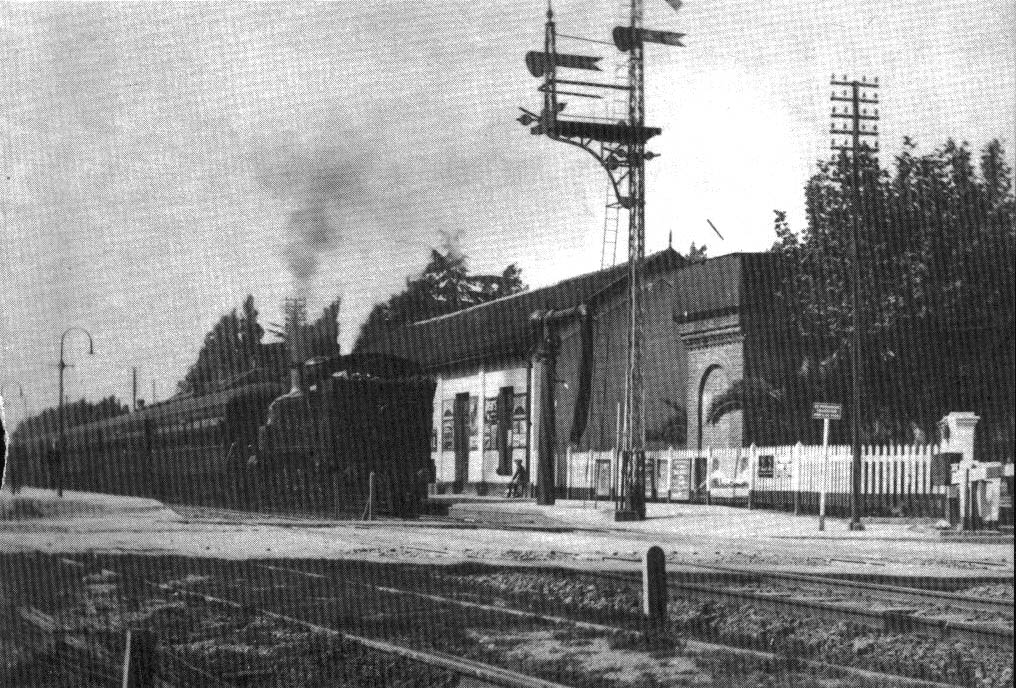
A train stopped at Belgrano R station, c. 1930

The CA supported the concept of agricultural colonies, where people settled and farmed. Bernstadt, Cañada de Gomez, and Carcañal were some of the agricultural colonies. More broadly, Schenoni argues that immigrant settlement along Argentine railway lines expanded the agricultural frontier and generated additional state revenue, creating a positive feedback loop that encouraged further railway investment. The CA was involved in transporting agricultural products, such as wheat, in the 1870s, and by the late 1880s, Great Britain received large quantities of agricultural products from Argentina.

The CA built a number of stations. Some train stations and the trains themselves possessed British names and influence. In 1891 the CA opened Fisherton station in the west of Rosario, as well as a new branch entering Rosario from the southwest and a stop on the line (Eloy Palacios station). Victoria station was also opened in 1891. Trains to Zelaya and Capilla del Señor departed from Victoria for the first time one year later. The CA also installed the first crossbuck and manually operated gates in the many level crossings existing by then. During successive years, several new stations were built by the company in Greater Buenos Aires, such as Beccar (1913), La Lucila (1933), Acassuso (1934) and Virreyes (1938).

The CA purchased multiple railroads or merged with them. One of these companies, the Santa Fe Western Railway, or SFWR ("Ferrocarril Oeste Santafesino"), was absorbed by the CA in 1900. The lines handled by SFWR, which served the southwest of Santa Fe Province and the south of Córdoba (up to the city of Cruz Alta), were merged with those of the larger company, and the passenger services handled by Rosario Oeste station were transferred to Rosario Central station, while the former was renamed "Rosario Este."

In 1908, the CA was merged with another company, Buenos Aires and Rosario Railway, which served the Buenos Aires–Rosario line. The passenger services were unified and optimized: Rosario Central station was left in charge of short and mid-distance services, while Rosario Norte station was set aside for long-distance and express services. The fused company opened two new stops in Rosario, Parada Cruce Alberdi (present-day Patio Parada) in the north-center of the city, and Parada Golf (or Parada Links), in the western limit of the municipality, near today's Rosario Golf Club.

New rail lines were added to the CA. In 1916, the Retiro-Tigre line was electrified, becoming the first electrified railway system of South America. New British Thomson-Houston (BTH) multiple units were acquired to run on the line. The CA ran several express services to the northern Argentina, such as El Rápido (inaugurated in 1910), which was the first express train of Argentina. That service could reach the city of Rosario in about 5 hours. In 1925, the new Campana station, located nearer the center of downtown, was opened. A long-distance service extended from Córdoba to Tucumán and allowed passengers to be able to cross the border into Bolivia by train. El Panamericano, inaugurated in 1929, was a specific rail line that allowed for passengers to be able to travel to Bolivia; it reached Tucumán and allowed passengers to transfer Ferrocarril Central Norte trains to cross the border to Bolivia. One year later, the Estrella del Norte (a train that would become a classic) joined Buenos Aires and Tucumán, towed by W G Armstrong Whitworth & Co PS11 locomotives.

The company continued its expansion. Between 1935 and 1940, already past the "golden age" of Argentine railways, Rosario Central station managed seventy daily train services, with an annual average of 438,000 passengers. In 1936, the company owned 520 locomotives, 976 coaches and more than 20,000 goods wagons.

By 1948, the following companies had been added to the CA railway network:

Central Argentine Railway (1948)
Former company	Province/s covered	Acquired
BA Northern	Buenos Aires	1888
Santa Fe Western	Santa Fe	1900
BA & Rosario	Buenos Aires, Santa Fe, Córdoba, Sgo. del Estero, Tucumán	1908

=== Nationalization ===
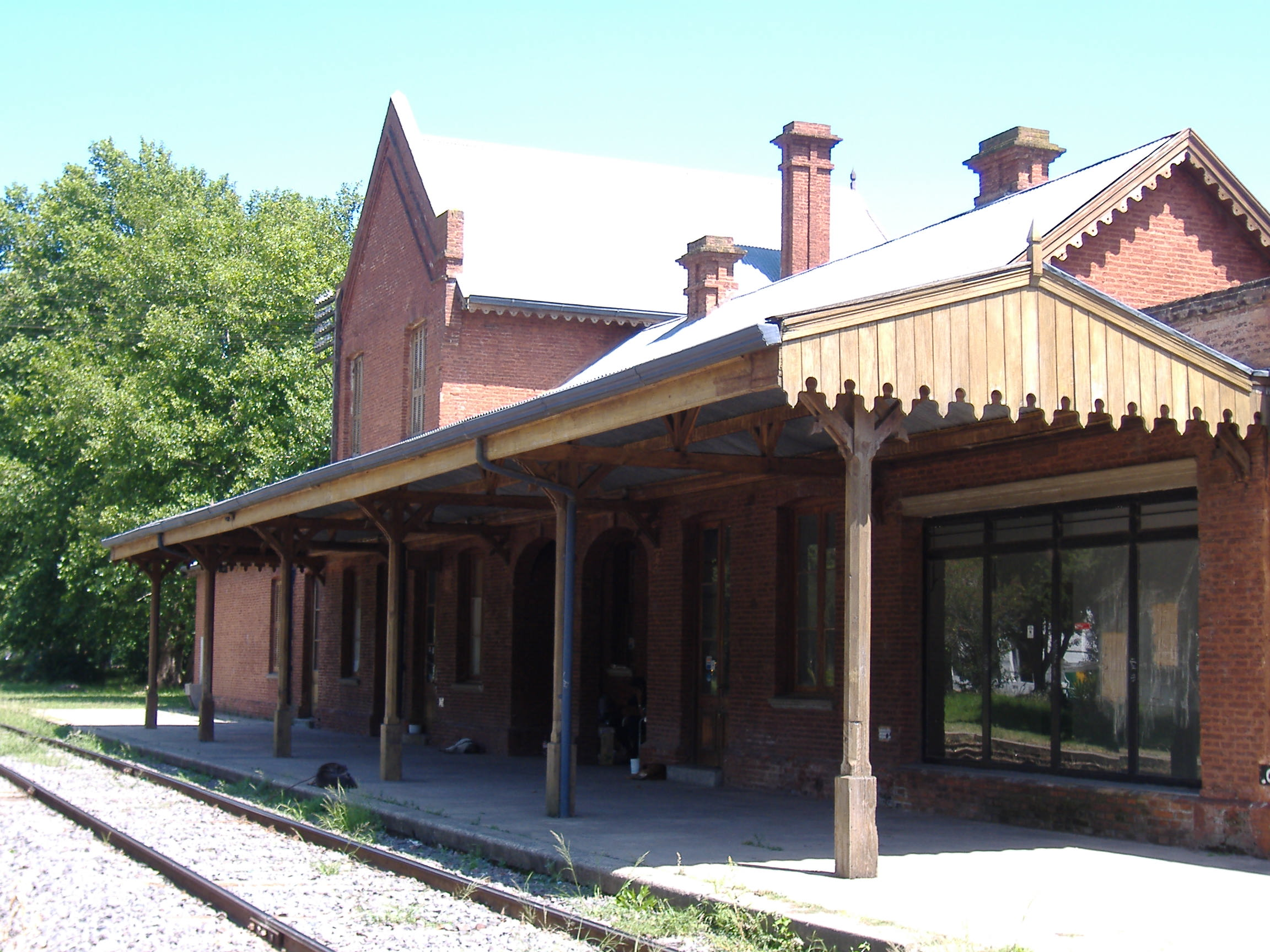
Former Fisherton station (now Antártida Argentina) of Rosario, as seen in 2006

British railway companies operating in Argentina, including the CA, were nationalized in 1948 by the Juan Perón administration. The CA took over the northern section of the Ferrocarril Rosario y Puerto Belgrano and then became part of the state-owned Ferrocarril General Bartolomé Mitre. The railway system as a whole was reconfigured and this meant the closure of many stations; in the case of the Ferrocarril Mitre, only the original Rosario Central station was left to handle passengers.

== Relationships with employees and government ==
The CA had a complicated relationship with its employees in the 1910s. At the beginning of World War I, there was a patriotic fervor among CA employees because they were working for a British-owned company and supported the side of Great Britain in the war. However, as the war continued on, a variety of factors led to strikes against the CA, including one that occurred in Rosario in September 1917 (the first major railway strike in Argentina). These strikes resulted from a variety of issues: people being fired (sometimes because they had a German background, and the Germans were the enemies of the British during World War I) or laid off, receiving lower wages (although these were not universal), and having a higher cost of living. The rise of unions and the Argentine government's involvement in settling disputes between employees and the company led to the end of the intense time of protests, which lasted from 1916 to 1922.

The CA's relationship with the government in the 1920s was also complicated. Due to financial struggles coming out of World War I, Argentine railroads sought to raise their rates in order to raise more revenue, but the Argentine government, led by Hipólito Yrigoyen and his Radical Civic Union party, tried to intervene and set railroad rates. Argentine railroads hired lawyers to defend them, but each of the railroads viewed the situation differently, with the CA lawyers stating that they could not oppose the government. After much debate, the railroads were permitted to collect the higher rates which they wanted, and the railroads began collecting these rates in August 1922. The next administration of the Argentine government, the Alvear administration, sought to lower railroad rates, but maneuvering by the CA enabled the issue to not be addressed until Yrigoyen regained power. The railroad rates were not reduced during the Yrigoyen administration partially due to a positive relationship between a CA official and Yrigoyen, and the controversy concluded.

== In popular culture ==
At the end of the 1880s a group of CAR workers used to meet to play a form of "football" in the vacant lands located near Alberdi Avenue. At Christmastime in 1889, almost 70 people met in a bar with the purpose of establishing a football club. British citizen Thomas Mutton suggested the name "Central Argentine Railway Athletic Club," which was approved. At the beginning, the club only allowed employees of the CAR to be members of the institution.

In 1903, the club changed its name to "Rosario Central." It would later become one of the most prominent clubs in the city, along with arch-rival Newell's Old Boys.

== See also ==
- William Wheelwright, CAR owner
- Henry Herbert Loveday, general manager of the CAR, 1895 to 1910
- Charles Barrie, Director.
- Rosario Central, football club founded by CAR's employees
