= Nutibara =

Nutibara (also known as Atibara) was a Guaca chieftain who ruled over the Nutibara and the Abibe in the 16th century.

His father, Anunaybe, was a Guaca chieftain. His brother, Quinuchu, commanded Nutibara's military in the field and was appointed as governor in Sierra de Abibe after conquering it.
