= Rosario Central railway station =

Former railway station in Rosario, Argentina

Coordinates: 32°56′13.82″S 60°38′25.15″W

Rosario Central
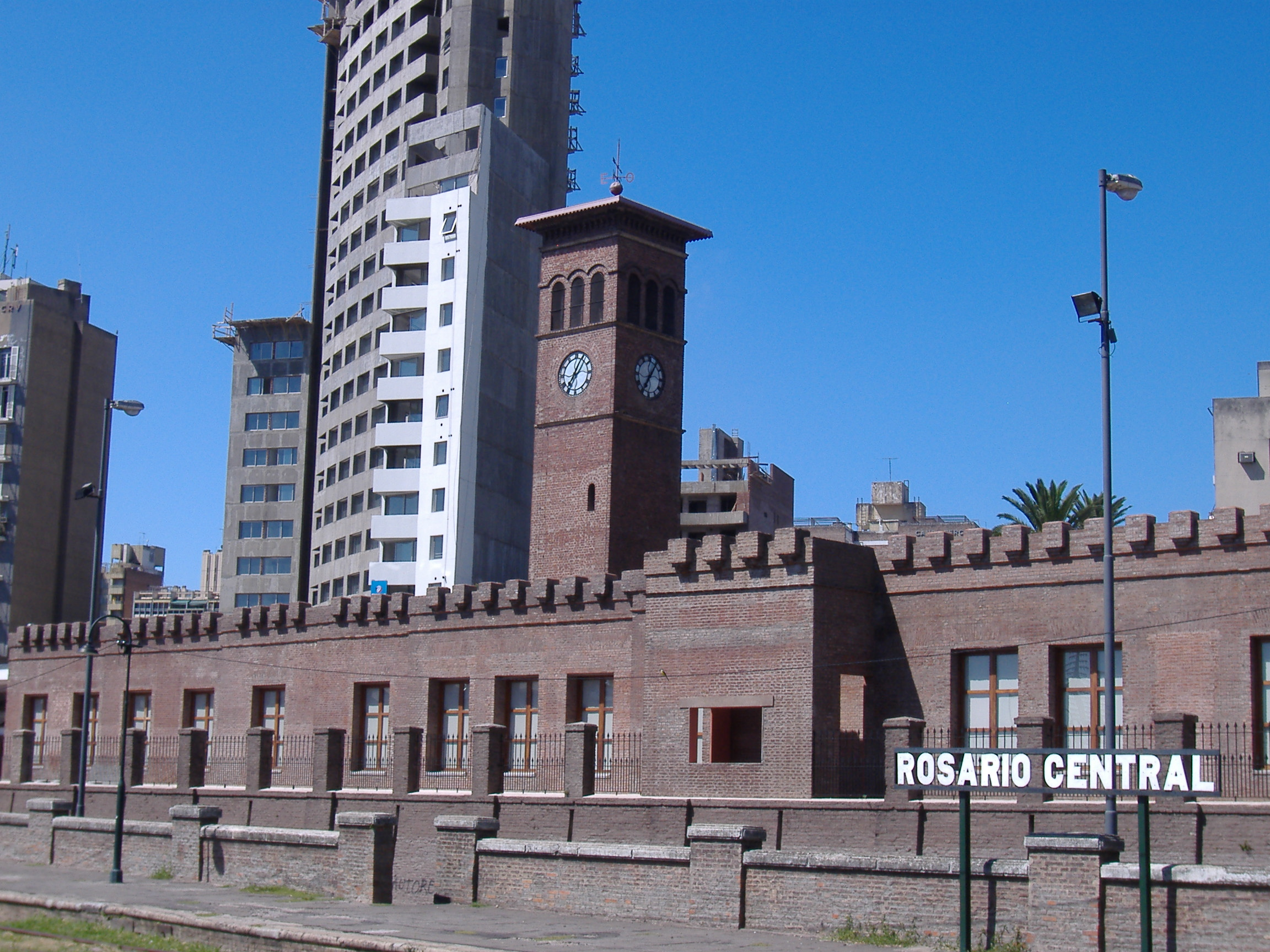
- The station viewed from the east, 2007

General information
- Location: Av. Wheelwright and Corrientes, Rosario, Argentina
- System: Regional rail
- Owner: Municipality of Rosario (1999-present)
- Operator: Central Argentine Railway (1868−1948); Ferrocarriles Argentinos (1948−1977)
- Line: Mitre

History
- Opened: 1868
- Closed: 1977; 49 years ago
Location

Rosario Central is a former railway station in Rosario, Argentina. It is located at the junction of Corrientes St. and Wheelwright Avenue, in the city center, not far from the coast of the Paraná River.

The station was part of the Mitre Railway network until 1977 when it fell into disuse. After being restored by the Municipality of Rosario, in 2005 the building was re-opened as the seat of the Center Municipal District, named "Antonio Berni".

== History ==
=== Background ===
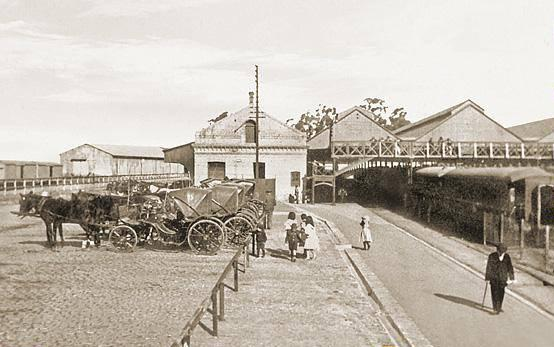
Station platforms with some carriages waiting for passengers, 1907

The station served as a terminus of the Central Argentine Railway company. Its construction was started in 1868 and finished in 1870. At the time it was among the most important stations in the country due to its size, the funds invested in it, and the amount of traffic. It was built by British capital following the neo-gothic Italian style en vogue at the time, with a characteristic clock tower.

The railway starting at the station joined Rosario to the city of Córdoba, 396 km to the west. It was the first of the eight lines that eventually worked in Rosario, the country's longest at the time, and the first line that joined two Argentine provinces.

In 1908, after the merging of the Central Argentine and the Buenos Aires and Rosario Railway companies, the station was set aside to handle the short- and mid-distance passenger services, while Rosario Norte was destined to long-distance and express services. Rosario Central managed seventy daily train services between 1935 and 1940, with an annual average of 438,000 passengers.

=== Closure ===
Most local and mid-distance train services were cancelled in 1977, and Rosario Central Station was shut down and left abandoned. Starting in 1987, the rails joining the station with the port were removed to leave room for the construction of the Avenida Ribereña Central (Central Riverside Avenue).

An experimental passenger service that departed from the station was briefly set up in November 1989, but abandoned one month later. Additional facilities of Rosario Central, north of the station proper (workshops, stores, etc.) were demolished in 1993 as the avenue's construction progressed, and in 1997 the rails that led to the station were removed, thus making it practically impossible for it to be used again as a railway terminus.

=== Restoration ===
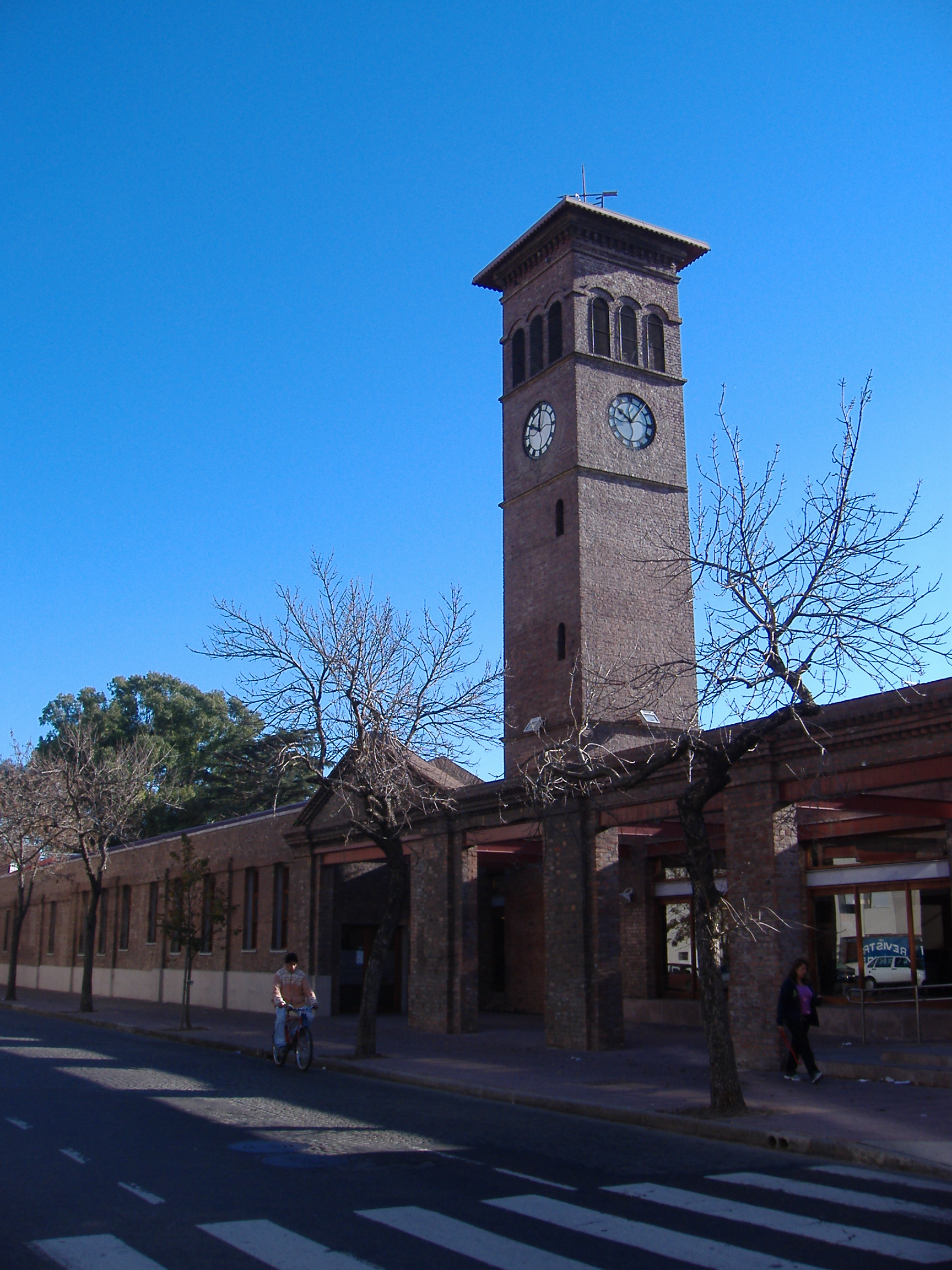
The entrance to the Center Municipal District, on Wheelwright Avenue, pictured in 2007

In 1999 ENABieF, the state organization that managed the former assets of railway companies, gave over control of Rosario Central Station to the Municipality of Rosario. The municipal administration decided to restore the building, preserving most of its outer appearance, and employing it as the seat of the Center Municipal District, as part of its decentralization programme. The District Center, named Antonio Berni (honouring the local eponymous painter), serves an area of 20.37 km² with a population of 261,047. Colombian architect Laureano Forero Ochoa was involved in restoration work along with local architect Luis Grossman.

Another part of the former station, separated from the rest by a short bridge over a road tunnel, was turned into an educational/entertainment center for children called La Isla de los Inventos ("Invention Island").

The station is on the list of works and sites of patrimonial value of the municipality of Rosario, as item 010180000.

== Historic operators ==
Companies that operated the Rosario (CC) train station since its inauguration were:

Operator	Period
(United Kingdom) Central Argentine Railway	1870–1912
(Argentina) Ferrocarriles Argentinos	1948–1977
