= Cirigliano (surname) =

Cirigliano is an Italian surname. Notable people with the surname include:

- Claudio Cirigliano (born 1964–65), Argentine businessman
- Elsa Cirigliano (born 1934), first lady of Guatemala
- Ezequiel Cirigliano (born 1992), Argentine footballer
- Nicola Cirigliano (born 2000), Italian footballer
