= Claudio Cirigliano =

Argentinian businessman

Sergio Claudio Cirigliano is an Argentinian businessman who, with his brother Mario, operates major rail and bus concessions in Buenos Aires and elsewhere in Argentina through the Grupo Plaza conglomerate. One source has described the brothers as making up “one of the most powerful business groups in the country.”

Cirigliano and his brother were widely held responsible for the deadly Once railway disaster in February 2012, which occurred on one of the railway lines that they ran, because they had allegedly pocketed government subsidies intended to cover maintenance costs. Grupo Plaza was said to have been awarded concessions for rail and bus lines because of Cirigliano's close friendships with Presidents Carlos Menem, Nestor Kirchner, and Cristina Fernandez de Kirchner. Also, Cirigliano was accused of having bribed Secretaries of Transportation Ricardo Jaime and Juan Pablo Schiavi, who directly oversaw the awarding of rail and bus concessions. Later in 2012, both Cirigliano and his brother Mario went on trial on charges of corruption and fraudulent administration in connection with the Once crash.

La Nación described him as the “successful driver of the K line,” the “K” being a sardonic reference to his close connections to the Kirchner family.

== Early life and education ==
Cirigliano is the son of Nicola Cirigliano, who was born in Vaglio Basilicata, Italy, and moved to Argentina at age 18. After working as a laborer and truck driver, Nicola borrowed money from a friend and bought a bus route. This was the beginning of a transport firm, originally called Transporte Automotor Plaza, which he founded in 1959. Claudio, born in 1964 or 1965 (in September 2009, he was 44 years old), was Nicola's last-born son. Claudio grew up in Parque Patricios and studied at a technical college.

== Career ==
=== Grupo Plaza ===
After completing his studies, Cirigliano went to work in the family business. In 1975, for health reasons, Nicola handed over the management of his business to Claudio and his two other sons. At that time the family owned a few passenger buses for an urban line namely the two bus lines, 61 and 62.

Claudio Cirigliano's friendships with presidents Carlos Menem and Nestor Kirchner played a crucial role in the growth of the family business, winning the Ciriglianos more and more concessions and subsidies. One source attributes their success largely to their ability to form “strategic ties with shifting political powers.” The Cirigliano brothers have been described as being “forever friends of power,” whose business was created and maintained through government subsidies. Claudio's closeness to Menem is reflected in the fact that he was part of the entourage that accompanied Menem on his first visit to the UK. In the 1990s, the two men played golf together frequently.

The business empire of Claudio Cirigliano and his brother began to grow significantly in the 1990s, when they profited from the privatization of many rail lines under Menem, who gave them control of several of the lines. During this time the brothers established or bought many companies which became subsidiaries of the family firm, which was originally named Transporte Automotor Plaza and which later changed its name to Grupo Plaza. In 1991 the Ciriglianos formed the holding company Comercio Metropolitano de Transporte (Cometrans). Today, Grupo Plaza is the main shareholder in Cometrans. The formation of the holding company Cometrans made it possible for the Cirigliano brothers to obtain the concession for the Metrovías SA subway service, which they held from 1994 to 2000.

In 1993, the brothers acquired the San Martin General Military Factory, which they made the headquarters of their firm Emprendimientos Ferroviarios (EMFER), which is involved in the repair and maintenance of railroad cars, and Tecnología Avanzada en Transporte SA (TATSA), which assembles and repairs buses. In 1993 they acquired Lines 143, 141, and 36; in 1994, they acquired 140, 142, and 133; in 1998 they acquired Línes 124 and 114. The Ciriglianos also bought stock in the Line 104 firm. In 1994 they were granted the concession to run Trenes de Buenos Aires (TBA), which controls the Mitre and Sarmiento train lines; they began running it in 1995. The TBA concession marked the beginning of their climb to prominence with no notable hindrance under the Kirchner administration. Between 1994 and 2000 Cometrans ran the Metrovías concession, and from 1998 to 2007 it was one of the firms that ran the Metro in Río de Janeiro through the Opportrans consortium.

While Menem, during his presidency, helped the Ciriglianos to acquire railway lines, Kirchner, in his time, helped them expand into the long-distance bus sector. which became the focus of their expansion efforts in 2003. The family business is also said to have greatly benefited from Claudio Cirigliano's close relationship with Domingo Cavallo, who served as Minister of the Economy under Menem and Fernando de la Rúa. At one point, the state paid the Cirigliano brothers seventy million dollars to cover ten years' worth of repairs to the trains running on the Sarmiento and Mitre lines.

In addition to his close ties to the late Nestor Kirchner and to current President Cristina Fernandez de Kirchner, Cirigliano has had longstanding connections with several leading Kirchnerite politicians. In 2003, he collected campaign contributions for Kirchnerite politician Anibal Fernandez; he gave Ricardo Jaime, Nestor Kirchner's Transportation Secretary, a Toyota in 2003 and a horse in 2007; and he once sent a doctor to treat Cristina Fernandez de Kirchner's Minister of Planning, Julio De Vido, for diabetes. Claudio owns a Citation 501 plane, which he has lent to public officials. One reflection of Cirigliano's closeness to the Kirchers is the fact that for six months, at the request of the government, he paid the salaries of employees of the defunct airline Southern Winds, to which the brothers had no connection.

Over time, Grupo Plaza came to run public transport throughout Argentina. As of 2009, the Ciriglianos owned 21 of the 135 local bus lines in Buenos Aires and several more in La Pampa and Bahia Blanca, plus a number of long-distance bus routes, in addition to the Sarmiento and Mitre railway lines. Grupo Plaza also has investments in Miami.

The three Cirigliano brothers own Grupo Plaza jointly. Sources disagree on the way in which they divide their responsibilities. According to the Argentina Independent, Mario is officially the head of the firm, while Claudio is head of Trenes Buenos Aires (TBA). According to La Nación, Claudio manages the department that deals with lines of transport, while Mario is in charge of the subsidiary Consorcio Metropolitano de Transporte (Cometrans); in turn, says La Nación, Cometrans controls the firms TBA (trains), Emfer (rail equipment construction), TAT SA (bus construction) and Ferrovial Baires (buildings and railway infrastructure). Another source describes Claudio as the head of Cometrans and his brother Antonio as the head of TBA. Yet another source identifies Claudio as the largest shareholder in TBA and Roque Cirigliano, the brothers' cousin, as manager of TBA's rolling stock. Still another source describes Grupo Plaza as the transport division of the Cirigliano Group, with TBA, Emfer, and TATSA also being divisions of the Cirigliano Group, along with Lua La porteña (an insurance firm), Opportrans, and, until 2007, Rio de Janeiro Metro (both foreign concessions). The Cirigliano Group is also involved in bilateral projects, such as the railroad between Argentina and Uruguay.

In addition to accumulating bus and train routes, both urban and interurban, the Ciriglianos were contracted to manufacture and repair vehicles and to maintain infrastructure. They also opened a travel agency, Pasajes Express, and a company that places advertisements on trains, buses, and streets. Grupo Plaza owns Transmedios, a PR firm, which was founded in 2007, and in 2009 they founded Ticketrans, which sells farecards for the trains and buses operated by the group. Grupo Plaza has also been a main beneficiaries of the national government's “TV for All” plan to prove free TV to 1.2 million welfare recipients. Televisión Digital Terrestre (TDT), a holding company that is a subsidiary of Grupo Plaza, won a contract to supply decoders for the plan. Under the umbrella of Cometrans, meanwhile, is the firm Consorcio New Tronic, which manufactures signal converters that are also part of the “TV for All” plan. The firm obtained a 160 million peso contract for the manufacture of 1.2 million digital converters.

A 2013 report stated that the brothers own two passenger-transport firms in Miami, Travelynx and Red Coach. In 2009, they bought Travelynx, which operates private shuttles. Later they bought Red Coach, which specializes in “luxury transport.” Also, the brothers own a subsidiary of Cometrans called Cometrans Qatar, founded in 2009 with the purpose of entering the Arab market. On behalf of Cometrans Qatar, Claudio Cirigliano carried out negotiations with Qatargas that concluded in January 2011. The result was an arrangement whereby Argentina would import 8 million dollars' worth of gasoline per day. Cometrans Qatar also constructed a 2,177-kilometer railway line connecting parts of Saudi Arabia with the United Arab Emirates. The firm also entered into a collaborative arrangement in January 2010 with Aamal Company QSC.

Today Grupo Plaza calls itself “la empresa de impresas” – “the business of businesses.” It operates 40 urban lines, 20 in the City of Buenos Aires, 12 in the city of Bahía Blanca and 8 lines in the city of Santa Rosa, La Pampa. The group also owns the firms Transporte Automotor Plaza, Mayo Transporte Automotor, Transporte Mariano Moreno, Transporte 104, Ecotrans (which runs 10 rural bus lines), Dumas Cat, Plus Ultra Mercobus, and El Rápido Argentino. Transporte Automotor Plaza, Dumas Cat, Plus Ultra Mercobus, and El Rápido Argentino all run medium- and long-distance services. The following firms provide the following transport services: Transporte Automotor Plaza runs lines 114, 124, 133, 140, 142, 143; Mayo Transporte Automotor runs line 141; Transporte Mariano Moreno runs line 36; Ecotrans runs the provincial lines 253, 321, 322, 317, 503, and 635. Grupo Plaza also controls the firm Sistemas Integrados de Gestion (SIG) SA, which provides IT services and develops software and other computer technology with transport applications. The Cirigliano family has control of city trains that transport 40 percent of the daily urban train traffic in Buenos Aires.

Today the company received billions of pesos in government subsidies. As of 2009, Cometrans was receiving 55 million pesos from the Argentinian government, 37 million for operating trains and 18 million for operating local transport. The Cirigliano Group received 76.9 million pesos (17.7M USD) in subsidies in January 2012. Claudio Cirigliano has maintained that the subsidies are necessary to keep fares down. In 2012, TBA was expected to receive more than two million pesos in state subsidies per day, totaling 832.5 million pesos annually. The Ciriglianos are also permitted to purchase gasoline at discounted prices.

=== Other business activity ===
Independently from Grupo Plaza, Claudio Cirigliano owns Yaniel SA, which is active in cattle raising. He also runs Invercla Inversora SA, an investment firm, and Ibancor, a real-estate firm. Mario Cirigliano owns Travel Shop SA, a marketing firm, and publishes Fuente: Revista Desafío Económico. Both brothers are on the payroll of the investment firm BC Austral. Their insurance firms Lua Seguros and Seguros La Porteña have been described as “judicially very irregular” and have been accused of having “swindled thousands of clients” in cases that led to numerous “unresolved lawsuits.”

For a time in the 1990s, Claudio Cirigliano also owned a security firm called Centauro.

== Once crash ==
On February 22, 2012, a train crashed at the Once railway station, killing 51 people. The train was on the Sarmiento line, operated by TBA. Blame was placed on Claudio Cirigliano and his brothers, who were accused of obtaining the railroad concession through favoritism and bribery and of pocketing government subsidies intended to cover maintenance costs. Specifically, the brothers were accused of bribing Ricardo Jaime, who served as Secretary of Transportation from 2003 to 2009, and Juan Pablo Schiavi, who held the same post from 2009 to 2012, with personal gifts and free travel.

A news report on February 24, 2012, stated that Jaime was facing charges in court that he had received “free vacation flights from Claudio Cirigliano, whose holding company owns Trenes de Buenos Aires (TBA), the company that runs the Sarmiento line and others.” The lawsuit maintained that Claudio Cirigliano had “paid for plane tickets to Brazil for Jaime, who at the time was in charge of granting subsidies to the private concession-holders running the rail system, so that they would keep ticket prices down.”

Héctor Polino, founder of a citizens group called Consumidores Libres (Free Consumers), which had filed many complaints against the firms running Argentina's railways, was quoted in the February 24 report as saying that when he was in the legislature, and the courts issued an interim measure to keep the transport companies from raising ticket prices, Cirigliano had tried repeatedly to get Polino to meet him at somewhere other than his congressional office; when Polino kept refusing, Cirigliano pressured him to cease pushing forward with the case, as did a representative of the transport workers union who said he was acting in Cirigliano’s name. It was suggested that the Argentinian government had failed to “impose the necessary controls on TBA and its owner, the Cirigliano Group, due to its close personal relations with the president, Cristina Fernández de Kirchner.”

After the Once crash, the Argentinian government withdrew control of the Mitre and Sarmiento train lines from Grupo Plaza.

On March 5, 2012, Federal Judge Claudio Bonadio banned Cirigliano and Transportation Secretary Juan Pablo Schiavi from leaving the country while an investigation of the Once crash proceeded. On June 5, 2012, Bonadio ordered Cirigliano's arrest along with that of three other TBA executives for obstructing the investigation of the Once crash. Also arrested were Carlo Ferrari, president of TBA; Dario Tempone, managing director of TBA; and Daniel Rubio, director of administration for TBA. Bonadio stated that Cirigliano had caused key evidence about government payments to TBA to disappear and that it was impossible to determine how the millions of dollars received by TBA from the government had been spent. Documents that Cirigliano had allegedly caused to disappear were eventually found in a reservoir.

On June 19, 2012, Federal Prosecutor Federico Delgado requested the prosecution of thirty persons, including Claudio and Antonio Cirigliano and former transport secretaries Juan Pablo Schiavi and Ricardo Jaime, in connection with the Once train crash. During the trial that ensued, Claudio Cirigliano told the court that TBA had a debt of approximately 1.9 billion pesos and said that money could be set aside to help the families of the crash victims.

La Nación reported on October 19, 2012, that Claudio and Mario Cirigliano, as well as former Secretaries of Transport Ricardo Jaime and Juan Pablo Schiavi, were being prosecuted in connection with the Once crash. The Cirigliano brothers were charged with conspiracy. While Bonadio had also indicted seven former TBA officials, he dismissed charges against the driver of the wrecked train, Marco Antonio Córdoba, and Antonio Sícaro, former comptroller of the National Commission for Transport Regulation (CNRT). La Nación further noted that Bonadio had ordered the Cirigliano brothers held in pre-trial detention, but that the Federal Chamber had cancelled the order. La Nación also quoted Minister of Interior and Transportation Florencio Randazzo as saying that the Sarmiento and Mitre train lines were “calamitous, a real disaster” as a result of the granting of the concession to the Cirigliano family.

On June 12, 2013, it was reported that judges of the Second Chamber of the Federal Criminal and Correctional Court of Appeals had removed the “lack of merit” clause protecting Mario Cirigliano from being questioned in the Once train crash. Both Claudio and Mario were charged with corruption and fraudulent administration in connection with the Once train crash.

An October 5, 2013, report stated that Claudio Cirigliano had been “accused of paying for the Brazilian holidays of the previous transport minister, Ricardo Jaime, as a tacit thank you for the millions of dollars in subsidies TBA has received from the state.” Also, a judicial investigation had established that Cirigliano “had bought costly Polynesian furniture and thousands of dollars’ worth of jewellery with a corporate credit card.”

The Chamber of Appeals declared inadmissible on September 24, 2014, appeals by Claudio Cirigliano and Jaime, who were on trial for the exchange of gifts.

== Personal life ==
Because of his size, Cirigliano was nicknamed “El Gordo” until 2008, when he had a gastric bypass operation and lost a good deal of weight.

== See also ==
- Rail transport in Argentina
- Emprendimientos Ferroviarios
- Trenes de Buenos Aires
