= Tren de los Pueblos Libres =

Former rail line connecting Argentina and Uruguay

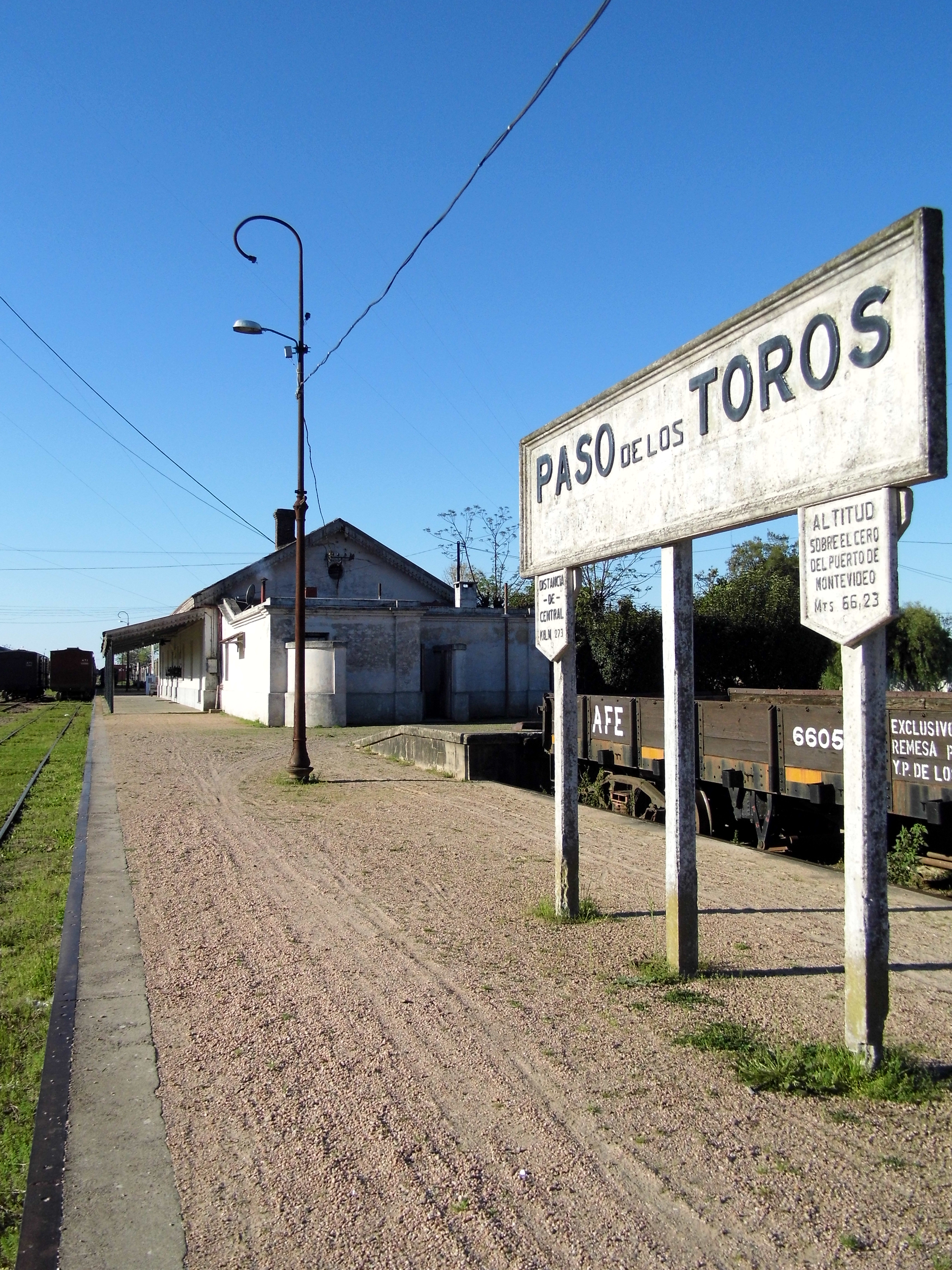
- Paso de los Toros, terminus in Uruguay

Overview
- Status: Inactive
- Owner: Government of Argentina; Government of Uruguay
- Locale: Argentina, Uruguay
- Termini: Pilar; Paso de los Toros
- Stations: 13

Service
- Type: Inter-city
- Services: 1
- Operator(s): (Argentina) TBA (Uruguay) AFE

History
- Opened: Sep 2011
- Closed: May 2012; 12 years ago

Technical
- Line length: 813 km (505 mi)
- Track gauge: 1,435 mm (4 ft 8 1/2 in) standard gauge
Route map
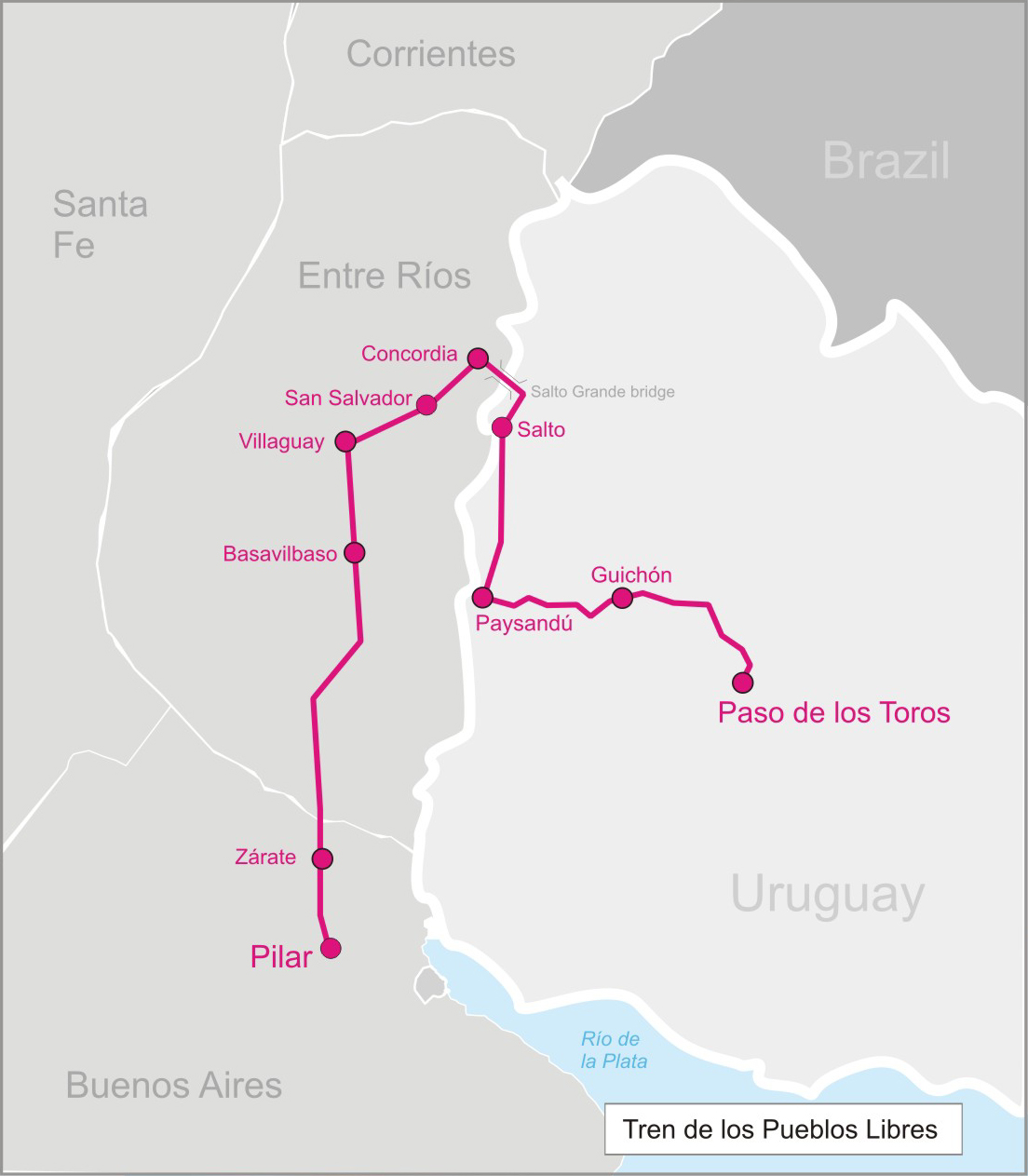

The Tren de los Pueblos Libres ("Train of the Free Peoples") was an 813-km length rural railway line that connected Argentina and Uruguay, being operated by both the Argentine private company Trenes de Buenos Aires (TBA) on General Urquiza Railway standard gauge rail tracks, and Uruguayan the State-owned State Railways Administration of Uruguay "Administración de Ferrocarriles del Estado" (AFE).

== History ==
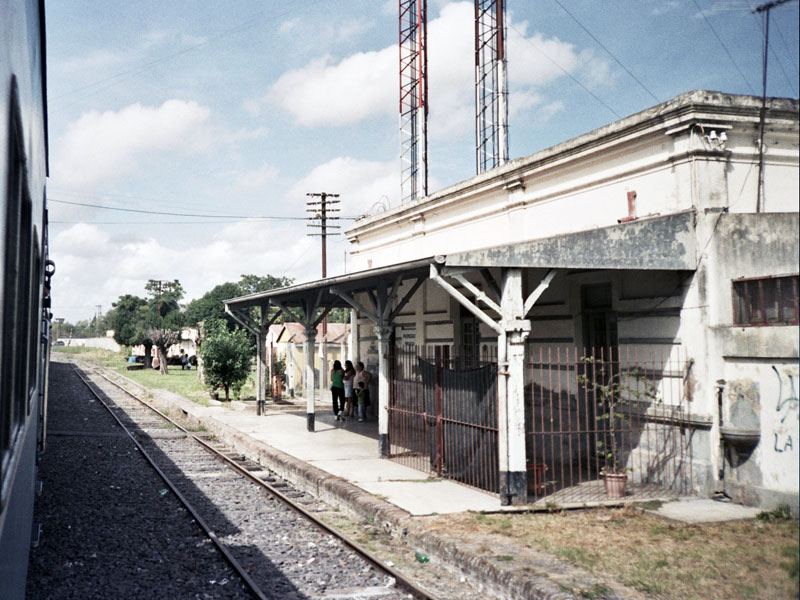
Pilar, terminus in Argentina.

The train had run from 1982 to 1985 between cities of Concordia (Argentina) and Salto (Uruguay). After 26 years of being active only for freight trains, the service was officially re-opened on August 11, 2011, in a ceremony held by Presidents of both countries. On 23 September the train made its first journey carrying people from Pilar to Paso de los Toros.

Some intermediate stops were Argentine stations Zárate, Enrique Carbó, Urdinarrain, Basavilbaso, Villaguay, San Salvador and Concordia and Uruguayan Salto, Quebracho and Paysandú. From Pilar to Buenos Aires passengers were carried by bus.

The project included the intention for trains to reach Montevideo in December 2011, although it would never be carried out.

On its first official journey, the train only reached Salto due to the Uruguayan Ministry of Transport still not having given authorisation for the service to operate in the country. Therefore, all passengers had to get out in Salto and the train continued without people to Paso de los Toros. The service was finally restarted on 30 September. Nevertheless, the service ran to Paso de los Toros only five times, with the terminus set up in Paysandú from November 2011.

From March 2012, the service was shortened again, setting Salto as terminus of the line. Afterwards, in May 2012 the Government of Argentina revoked the contract of concession to TBA after the Once rail disaster in which 51 people died and at least 703 people were injured on a service operated by the same company. Finally, on 28 May the service was interrupted and subsequently never restarted. The railcars that served the line are currently abandoned in Pilar.

== Gallery ==
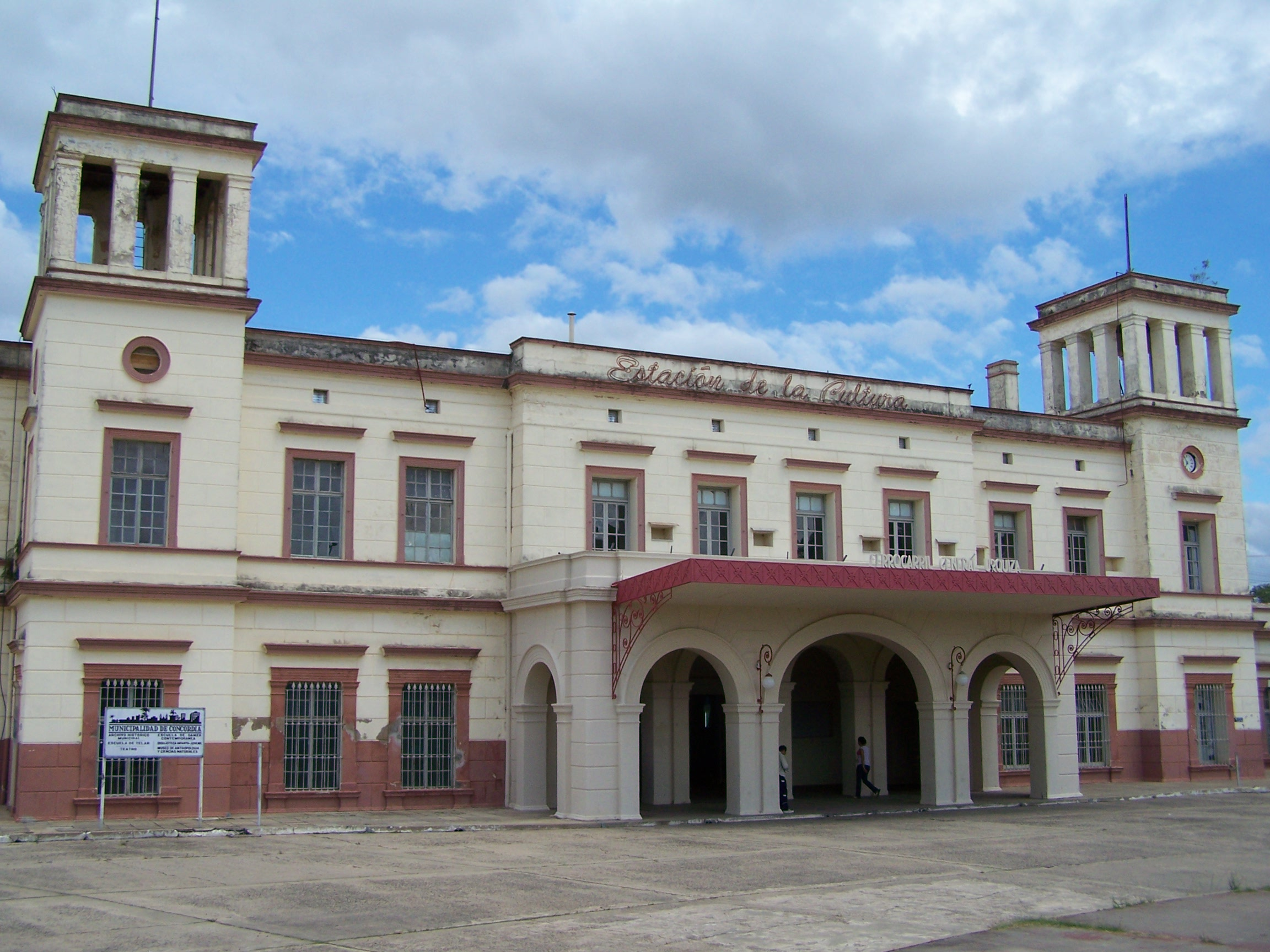
Concordia

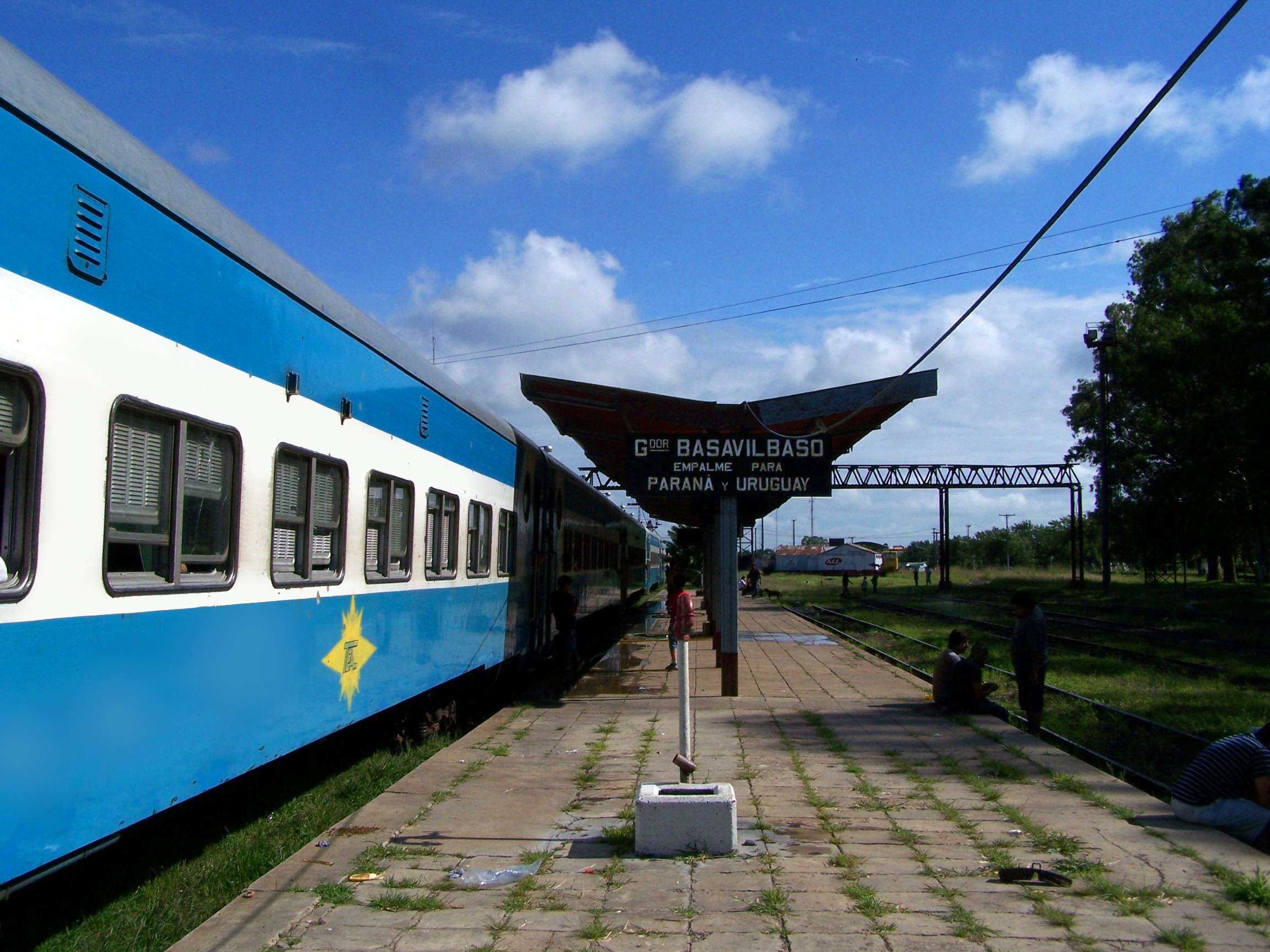
Basavilbaso

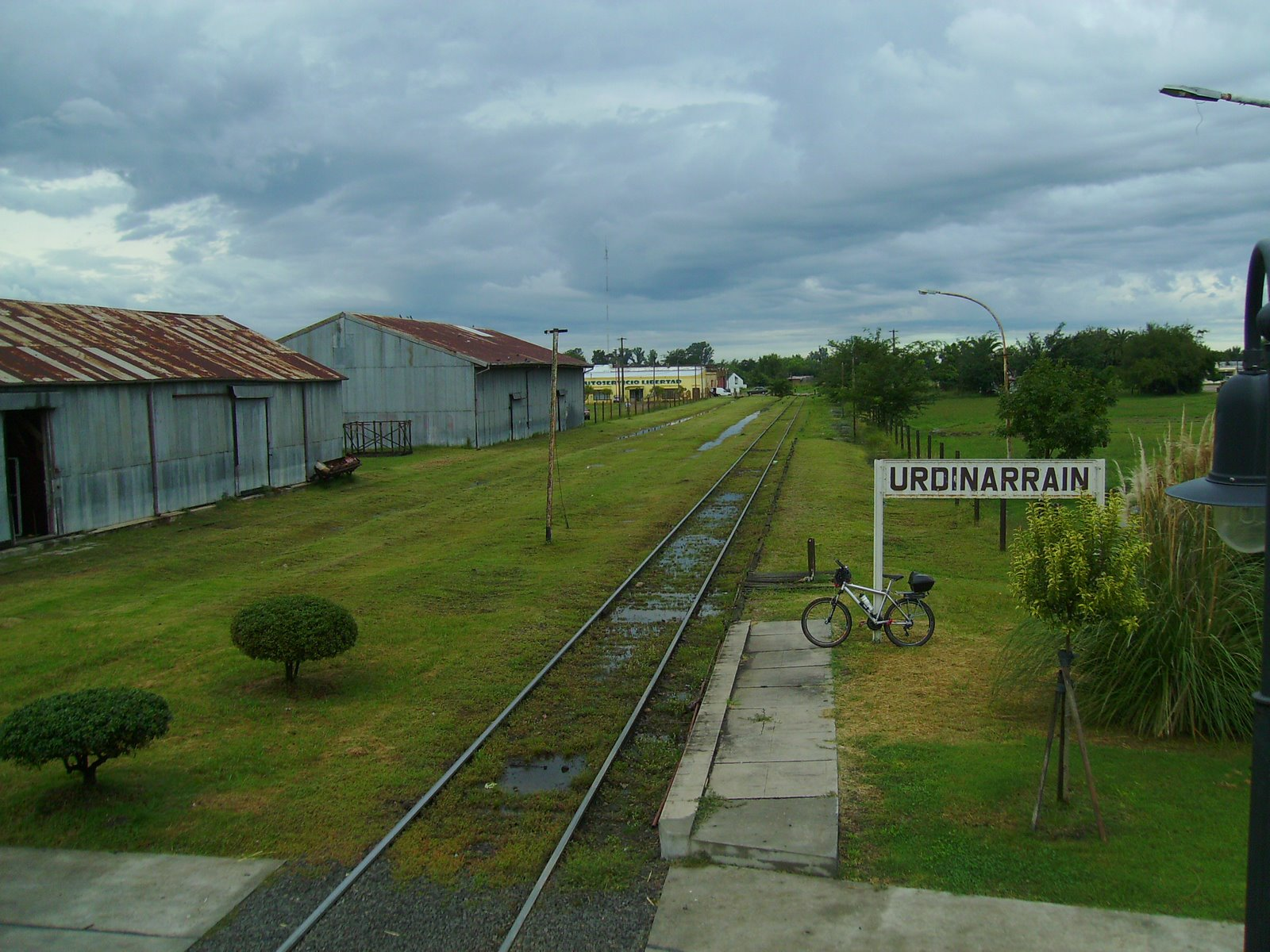
Urdinarrain

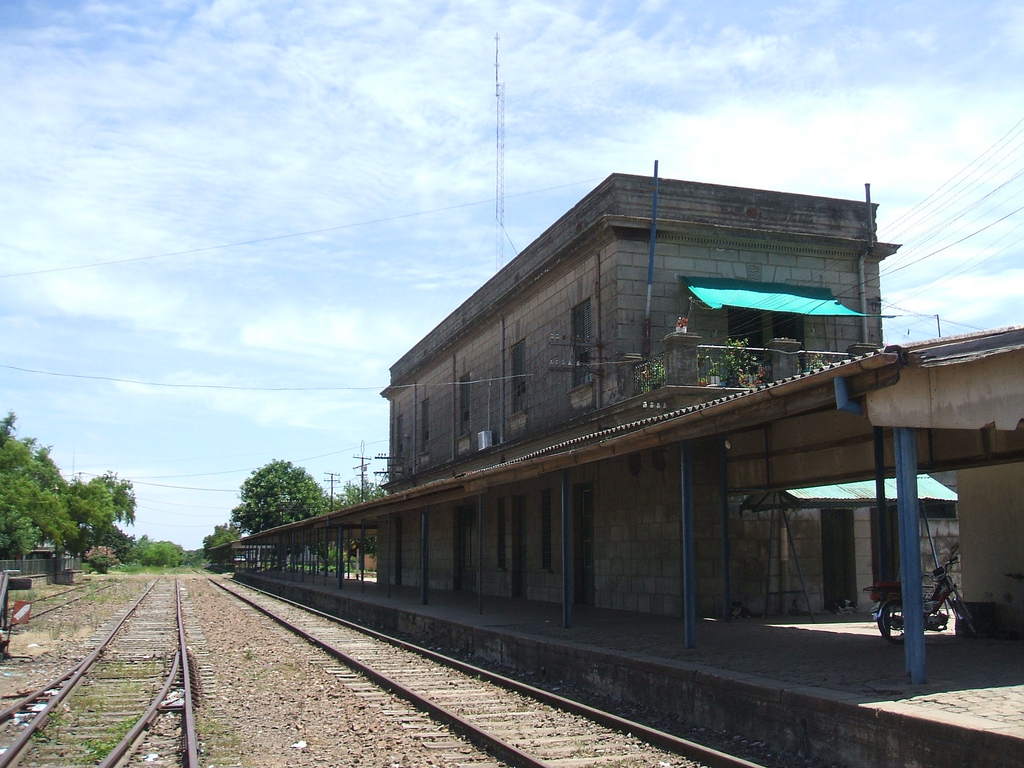
Salto

== See also ==
- State Railways Administration of Uruguay
