= Emprendimientos Ferroviarios =

Argentine rail rolling stock manufacturer, 2005–2014

Emfer S.A.

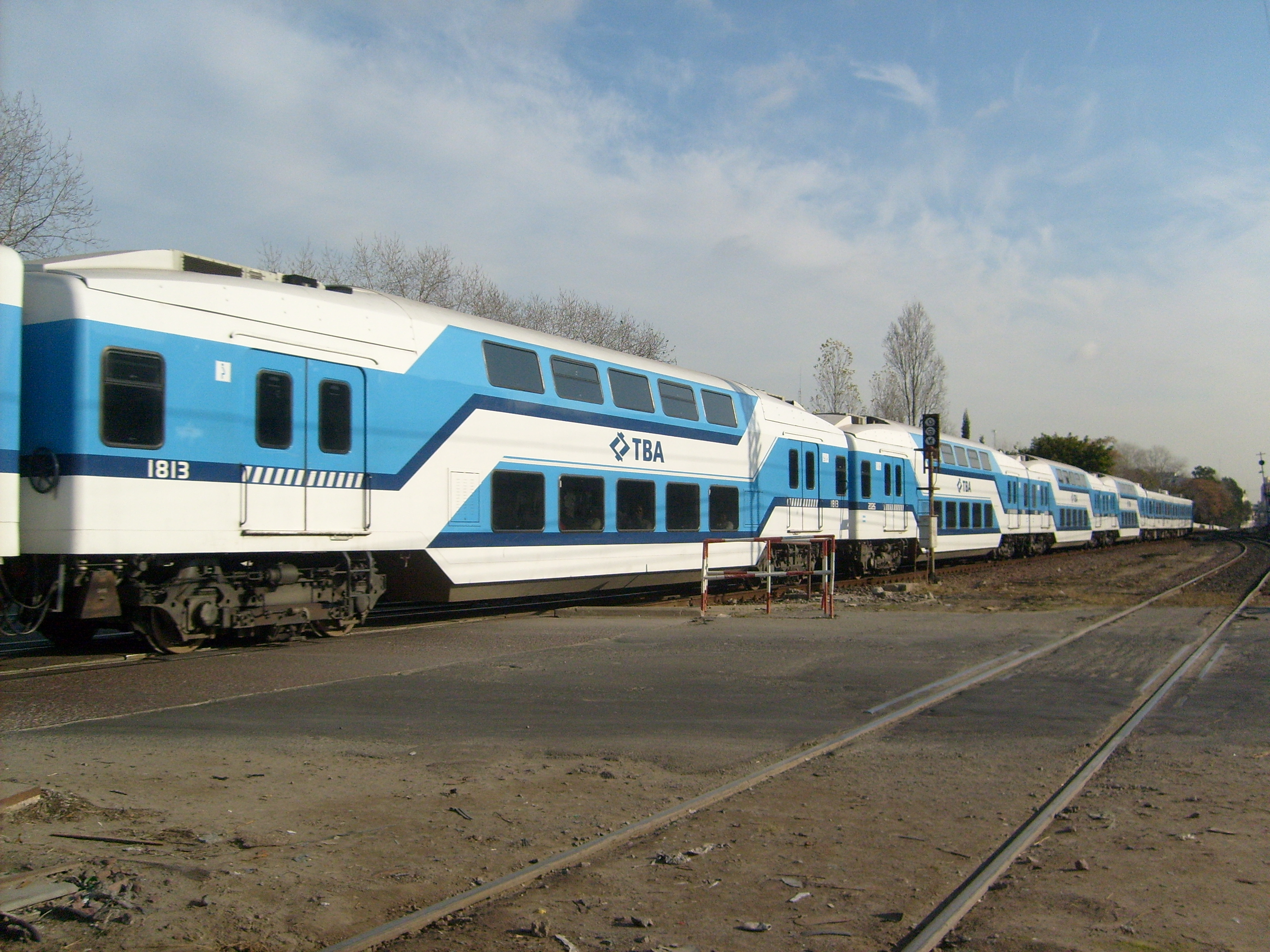
- Sarmiento Line double decker units used until 2013
- Type: S.A.
- Industry: Transport
- Founded: 2005; 21 years ago
- Defunct: 2014; 12 years ago
- Fate: Merged into CSR in 2014
- Headquarters: San Martín, Greater Buenos Aires, Argentina
- Products: Rolling stock
- Owner: Mario and Claudio Cirigliano

Emprendimientos Ferroviarios S.A. (Emfer) was an Argentine rail rolling stock manufacturer based in San Martín, Buenos Aires. The company also remodelled and repaired rail vehicles and had previously manufactured rolling stock for the Sarmiento and Mitre commuter rail lines in Buenos Aires. The Emfer rail rolling stock ran on the two lines until 2014 when they were replaced with CSR Corporation Limited Electric Multiple Units.

The company's main factory in San Martín once belonged to the state-owned Fabricaciones Militares (which manufactured military products in addition to rail rolling stock).

During its last years, the company was managed by brothers Mario and Claudio Cirigliano, who had been prosecuted following the Once tragedy in 2012. In January 2014 they decided to sell EMFER after the government of Argentina removed their concession to run the Sarmiento Line.

Later in 2014 the company became a subsidiary of CSR Corporation Limited, with the takeover intended so that the Chinese firm could build rail rolling stock in Argentina. After the takeover, CSR fired 40 former EMFER workers.

== See also ==
- Fiat-Materfer (Buenos Aires Underground) - underground trains in part assembled at EMFER
