= 1972 Chicago commuter rail crash =

Train wreck

Coordinates: 41.8449°N 87.6137°W

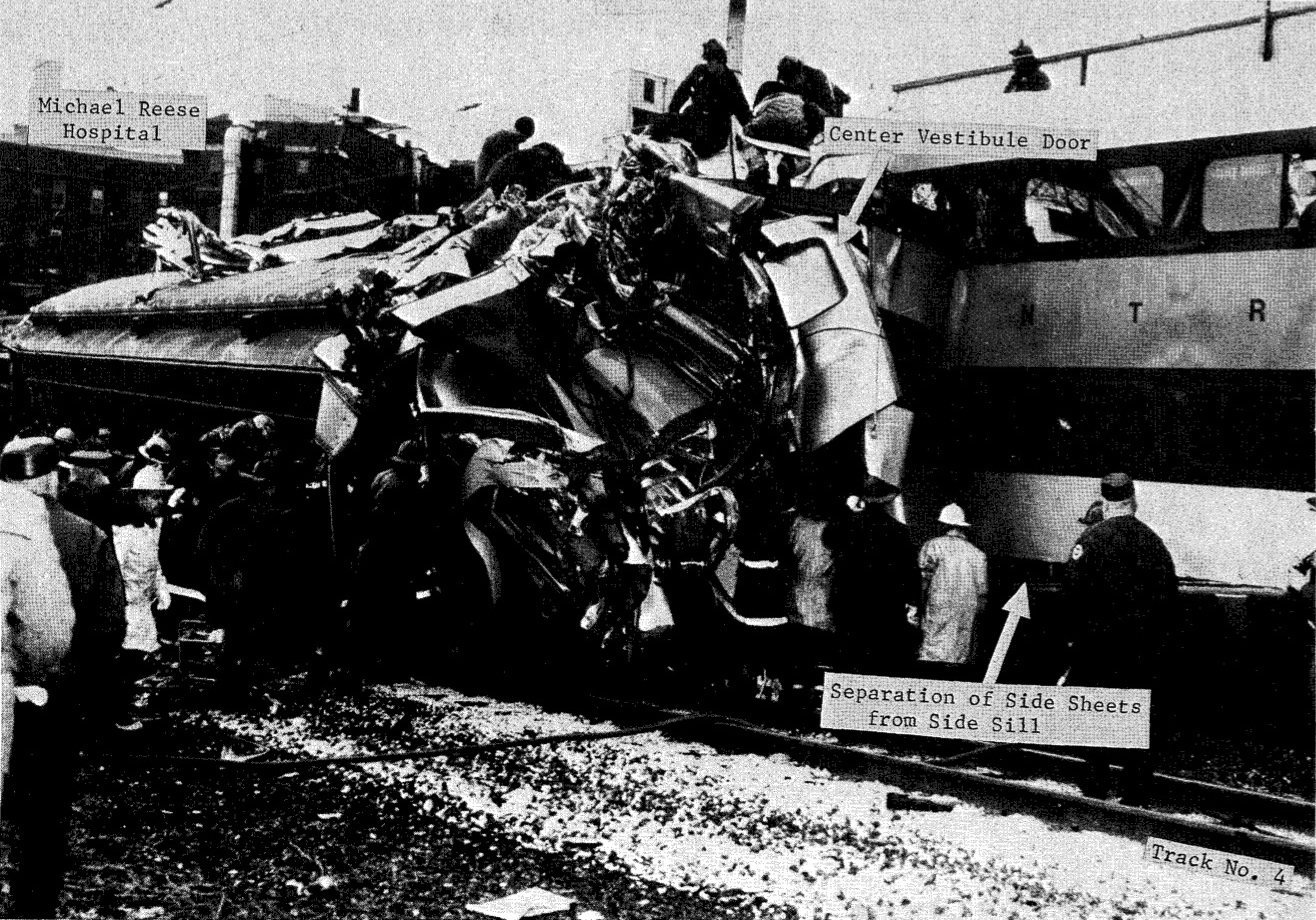
- NTSB photograph of the crash site

Details
- Date: October 30, 1972; 53 years ago
- Location: 27th Street station, Chicago, Illinois
- Country: United States
- Line: Electric Suburban service
- Operator: Illinois Central Gulf
- Incident type: Rear-end collision
- Cause: Train backed into signal block

Statistics
- Trains: 2
- Deaths: 45
- Injured: 332

A collision between two commuter trains in Chicago occurred during the cloudy morning rush hour on October 30, 1972, and was the worst such crash in Chicago's history. Illinois Central Gulf Train 416, made up of newly purchased Highliners, overshot the 27th Street station on what is now the Metra Electric District, and the engineer asked and received permission from the train's conductor to back the train to the platform. This move was then made without the flag protection required by the railroad's rules. The train's crew had not used a flagman before, and while it was a prescribed practice, it had fallen out of use. Instead, the conductor and the engineer worked in concert to back up the train, with the curve in the track partially blocking the view.

Train 416 passed the automatic block signals, which cleared express Train 720, made up of more heavily constructed single level cars, to continue at full speed on the same track. The engineer of the express train did not see the bilevel train backing up until it was too late. When the trains collided, the front car of the express train telescoped the rear car of the bilevel train, killing 45 people and injuring 332. The death toll could have been higher, but the accident occurred near Michael Reese Hospital (which later moved) and Mercy Hospital.

Later investigations showed that Train 720 likely could have seen the red light for Train 416 and avoided a collision if it was traveling slower (30 mph). It is estimated that Train 720 hit Train 416 at about 44-50 mph.
