= Ricardo Jaime =

Argentine politician

Ricardo Raúl Jaime
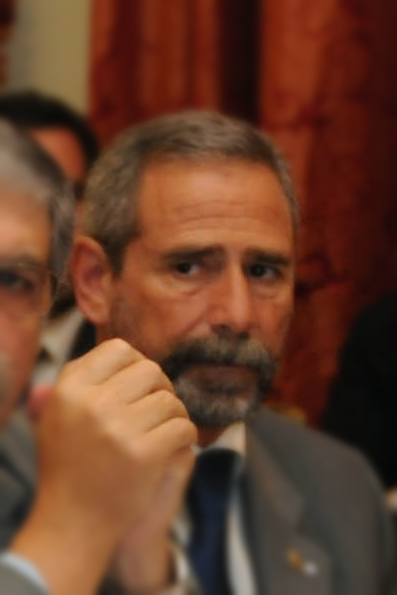

Secretary of Transport
- In office 23 May 2003 – 1 July 2009
- President: Cristina Fernández de Kirchner (2007-2009); Néstor Kirchner (2003-2007)
- Preceded by: Guillermo López del Punta
- Succeeded by: Juan Pablo Schiavi

Personal details
- Born: Córdoba, Argentina
- Party: Front for Victory
- Spouse(s): Gloria Edith del Corazón de Jesús Vílchez (separated); Silvia Reyss
- Children: 3
- Education: National University of Córdoba
- Profession: Surveying

Ricardo Raúl Jaime is an Argentine politician who was the longtime Secretary of Transportation under Presidents Néstor Kirchner and Cristina Fernández de Kirchner. Since he resigned that position in 2009, Jaime has been charged in dozens of criminal cases with such crimes as embezzlement, irregularities in awarding subsidies, abuse of authority, misappropriation of public funds, and conspiracy. In 2013, he received a suspended sentence of six months for concealment of evidence. In 2015 Jaime received an 18-month sentence for accepting bribes from the former train operator Trenes de Buenos Aires during his time as Secretary of Transport. Later that year, he received a further six years imprisonment for failure to prevent the 2012 Buenos Aires rail disaster.

== Career ==
=== Provincial politics ===
Jaime worked for the general land registry in his home province of Córdoba between 1983 and 1984, then relocated to Santa Cruz province, where he was director of the land registry from 1984 to 1987 and councilor and chairman of the Honorable Council from 1987 to 1991.

In 1989, when Néstor Kirchner began to campaign for governor of Santa Cruz, Jaime supported him. After Kirchner was elected governor, he appointed Jaime Minister Secretary General of the Interior for the province, a position he held until 1996. After Kirchner was elected to a second term, he appointed Jaime head of the Provincial Council of Education. In late 1999, he returned to Córdoba to assume the position of Deputy Minister of Education for that province.

“There are few records of his life in Córdoba,” wrote La Nación in 2005, adding that officials in that province refused to provide information about Jaime's professional history there. One source in Santa Cruz said that Jaime, during his time there, “spoke in Spanish but accented it as if it were English,” and identified himself as an Argentine investor who had been living in the U.S.

=== National politics ===
In May 2003, after Kirchner's ascent to the presidency of Argentina, he appointed Jaime the nation's Secretary of Transportation. Jaime was criticized because he had no transportation background. Nonetheless, he enjoyed the complete confidence of President Néstor Kirchner.

As Secretary of Transportation, Jaime was responsible for the management of 2 billion pesos a year to subsidize transport, and was accordingly known as “the lord of the subsidies.” His tenure, according to one source, “was marked by projects like the bullet train and the nationalization of Aerolíneas Argentinas, and judicial inquiries and complaints received against them.” By 2005 there were already many comments being made about his corrupt management of the transport sector, “although no one, of course, makes them aloud” for fear that their subsidies will be withdrawn. On August 26, 2007, Jaime, who at that point had already been formally charged with several offenses, from misappropriation of public funds to concealment of money laundering, was additionally charged with abuse of authority.

In the wake of numerous allegations of corruption against him, Jaime resigned three days after the government's defeat in the general elections of June 28, 2009. Jaime said he resigned “for personal reasons," and added that he fully affirmed “my membership in, my loyalty to, my commitment to, and my belief in the project being carried out from the political and institutional point of view [of] the Comrade President and Comrade Néstor Kirchner.” The resignation came amid “rumors about his possible departure” from the cabinet.

== Lawsuits ==
After Jaime's resignation, he became the defendant in several court cases. He was charged in the federal courts with receiving gifts, in a trial presided over by Judge Claudio Bonadio, and with illegal enrichment, in a trial presided over by Judge Norberto Oyarbide. It was widely noted that Jaime, while earning $10,000 per month, was able to purchase a residence on Avenida del Libertador in an exclusive neighborhood of Buenos Aires, a weekend home in a gated community in San Isidro, a jet, a hotel, a car, a motorcycle, a yacht worth a million dollars, a house in a country club in Córdoba, a summer house in Villa Carlos Paz, and several other weekend houses. His ownership of the jet was revealed on May 22, 2009, in La Nación.

In 2009, Manuel Garrido, former Prosecutor of Administrative Investigations, accused Jaime of profiting from the overpricing of rail cars and of taking weekend flights to Brazil on private jets at the expense of companies that received government subsidies.

In a case that was first brought in 2009, Jaime was accused of illegal enrichment, with investigators noting his purchase of a $4 million Lear 31A Jet, a $1 million yacht, several cars and SUVs, and other assets while he was Secretary of Transportation. In October 2012 his request that the charges be dismissed as unconstitutional was rejected by Oyarbide.

On March 26, 2010, Oyarbide ordered several simultaneous investigations of Jaime's properties in Buenos Aires and Córdoba.

In 2010, Jaime had to answer charges as to why he had disobeyed an injunction imposed by a federal judge in Corrientes, Carlos Soto Davila, who had stopped the privatization of the General Urquiza Railway rail corridor connecting the provinces of Buenos Aires and Misiones. That case was adjudicated by Federal Judge Marcelo Martínez De Giorgi.

In November 2010, Ricardo Cirielli, who had been Assistant Secretary of Transportation under Jaime, stated that Jaime had delivered a valise “several times a week” to Néstor Kirchner, presumably containing money. The former director of Aerolíneas Argentinas, Jorge Molina, said in 2012 that Jaime had served as a “collector,” or bagman, for Néstor Kirchner. Molina said that on one occasion he, Molina, had been asked to donate $1.5 million to the Cristina Fernández de Kirchner campaign, but that he had declined because the amount requested exceeded legal limits. Jaime had also asked him to buy 20 Embraer aircraft. Molina had declined in this case as well, because the planes were too small for the airline.

It was revealed in November 2010 that three Argentine businessmen had created a fund to enable Jaime to travel more comfortably.

In 2010, Clarín revealed the existence of 16,000 e-mails implicating Jaime in corrupt activities during his tenure as Secretary of the Treasury. The e-mails were described as an “X-ray of corruption.” The news of their existence caused the “transport world” to be “convulsed, almost in shock.” The e-mails, which as of November 2010 were being studied by “at least four judges,” illuminated among other things Jaime's “feverish negotiations with Spanish and Argentine transportation firms” in 2005 as part of a Kirchner government effort to obtain funds for that year's election campaign. Some of the e-mails also revealed Jaime's illegal acquisition of cars and his receipt of millions in commissions on the purchase in Spain and Portugal of railway parts. A request to rule the e-mails inadmissible as evidence in court against Jaime was rejected by Oyarbide but was agreed to in May 2011 by another court. The latter ruling was confirmed by yet another court in June 2012.

One case against Jaime, which was investigated in Chile, involved a payment made by the airline Lan Chile after receiving permission to operate in Argentina, and was thought to perhaps involve criminal acts by Chilean President Sebastián Piñera, who was a board member of Lan Chile until August 2007.

As of May 2011, Jaime was on trial in a bribery case involving the firm Grupo Plaza.

Some of the cases against Jaime involved his connections in the province of Córdoba, including such communications media as La Mañana de Córdoba and LV2.

Jaime went on trial in December 2011 before Judge Oyarbide on charges of having allowed the Teba company, which owned Retiro railway station, to pay the rent for two apartments in which he lived between 2003 and 2009. Jaime, in exchange, had awarded Teba an extension on its concession for the terminal.

A news report stated in July 2013 that research by Argentine authorities was uncovering “some fun facts about Jaime’s money-management customs.” The report noted his preference for cash, often in bags and hidden safes, and indicated that Jaime had put in the trunk of one of his daughters two bags full of incriminating papers or saving bonds. In his apartment on Avenida del Libertador, investigators found a black briefcase containing $24,820, a bag containing 10,000 euros, a box containing 40,000 pesos, and stacks of cash amounting to $10,200 and $20,000 each. The report pointed out that in June 2009, Jaime had declared that his possessions consisted of a BMW motorcycle, goods valued at 65,400 pesos, a humble cottage in Caleta Olivia in Santa Cruz, and less than 20,000 pesos in a bank account. The same report recalled that a search of one of Jaime's residences in 2010 had uncovered bundles of old airplane tickets, with each bundle worth approximately Jaime's official annual salary; bundles of money had also been found.

In July 2013, Julio Cobos, a former official in the Vice President's Office during the administration of Cristina Fernandez de Kirchner, said that Jaime, while serving under Néstor Kirchner, had reported directly to the President and that he had enjoyed Kirchner's “full confidence.”

In July 2013 Judge Bonadio began to try Jaime on charges of fraud involving contracts for railway improvements. On July 12, Bonadio declared Jaime to be in contempt of court, and ordered that Jaime be arrested and placed in preventive detention. He justified the order by noting that Jaime was the defendant in at least a dozen criminal cases. At the time Jaime was officially living at Villa Carlos Paz, Omahuacas 91, Barrio Costa Azul. Jaime did not submit himself for arrest, and instead went into hiding. Attempts to locate him, including raids on several of his residences in Buenos Aires, Córdoba, and elsewhere, were unsuccessful. Jaime's lawyer, Andrés Marturián, stated that Jaime was not cooperating with the arrest warrant issued by Bonadio because it was “arbitrary and not firm.” Describing the warrant as “a clear sign of perversity” and “mendacity” and a “violation of constitutional principles,” Marturián said that he would appeal the warrant and appeal the judge's refusal to exempt Jaime from prison. He also declined to say where Jaime was. Marturian assured the court that Jaime had not left the country and that he would appear in court after a decision was made in his request for exemption from prison. As of 15 July 2013, he was considered a “fugitive from justice.”

On that same date, federal prosecutor Maximiliano Hairabedian in Córdoba issued his own order for the capture and arrest of Jaime, who was scheduled to go on trial in his court on July 30 on charges relating to his alleged attempt to steal materials that were about to be put into evidence in another case. The evidence he had tried to steal was a set of business cards identifying him as CEO of the company Cerro Motorcycles.

On July 16, Judge Villalobo asked Interpol to capture Jaime. On July 18 he was granted exemption from imprisonment, although the exemption did not affect the international arrest warrant. Marturián called for a trial of Bonadio, whom he accused of politically persecuting Jaime. On July 22, Jaime presented himself in the federal courthouse in Córdoba. He said, “I am a person who abides by the law” and denied that there were 20 lawsuits against him, insisting that “only seven lawsuits” against him were “currently awaiting trial.” Marcelo Brito, a lawyer for Jaime, declared that the charges against Jaime had been “made up” and were based on “false witness” and called for the trial to be suspended. Hairabedian expressed doubts as to whether the trial would go on, given that there were several more important lawsuits under way against Jaime.

In September 2013, Jaime was found guilty in a Federal Court in Córdoba of attempting to steal evidence and received a suspended sentence of six months in prison. Judge Carlos Lascano called Jaime's defense “absurd and implausible.” In June 2014, the Federal Court of Appeals rejected an appeal of this verdict by Jaime.

Jaime was also tried for the private use of public cars.

In 2014, when Jaime was on trial for embezzlement, Lavieri reported on details that had been uncovered about the role of various intermediaries, including relatives, friends, and professional associates of Jaime, in his illegal enrichment activities. Some of them, it was alleged, had been fronts for Jaime's acquisition of wealth, while others had themselves profited from his activities. For example, Jaime's former partner, Silvia, had bought a Peugeot 307, a small yacht, an apartment in Río Gallegos, a house in Córdoba, a Honda Fit, an apartment in Florianópolis, a Honda Legend, and a house in a gated community in San Isidro, and traveled abroad extensively. Her daughter Lorena Jayo had bought a house and several cars; her daughter Agostina had bought a Fiat Uno and a Peugeot 206; together the sisters had bought property. The court did not believe the three women's claims that they had earned the money to pay for these items themselves; all three were charged.

=== Once rail disaster ===
In January 2013, the Buenos Aires Federal Court ratified the charges against Jaime in regard to the train crash and prohibited Jaime from leaving the country. In May 2013, Chamber III of the Federal Court of Criminal Appeals upheld the prosecution of Jaime in the train-wreck case. Jaime and others were charged with negligent derailment and administrative fraud. As of June 2014, the trial was still underway.

In October 2012, a federal judge indicted Jaime on charges of abuse of authority in a case involving the death of 51 people in a train crash in February of that year in the Once railway station. He was sentenced to six years imprisonment in December 2015.

== Attention ==
Jaime is the subject of the 2011 book El Rekaudador: Ricardo Jaime: La Cara de la Corrupcion en la Era Kirchnerista by Omar Lavieri. “Recaudador” means “collector”; in the book title, the letter “c” in the word “recaudador” is replaced with a “K” for Kirchner, a reference to Jaime's reputation as being Néstor Kirchner's “collector,” or bagman. The subtitle describe Jaime as “the face of corruption in the Kirchnerist Era.” The publisher described the book as a “snapshot of corruption in the Kirchner era” and called Jaime “part of the collecting machinery created by Néstor Kirchner to expand his political influence.” The book was “the result of three years of journalistic research based on dozens of interviews, hundreds of thousands of court documents and e-mails to Manuel Vázquez,” which lay bare Jaime's role “in a well-oiled illegal collection system that had the complicity of business and the protection of his old friend Néstor Kirchner.” Lavieri discovered that one businessman, Claudio Cirigliano, paid for Jaime's private air trips and another, Néstor Otero, paid his rent on Avenida del Libertador. The book presented e-mails detailing Jaime's personal enrichment at the hands of various transportation and construction companies.

== See also ==
- Amado Boudou
