= Juan Pablo Schiavi =

Argentine politician

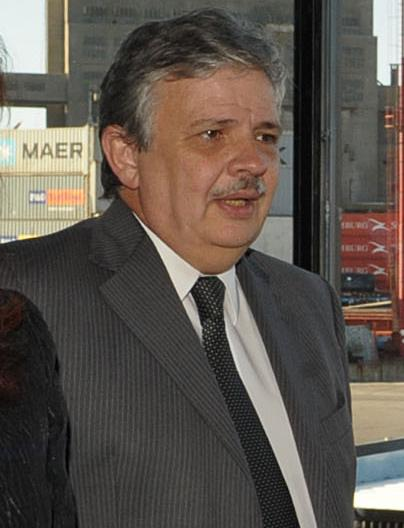
Juan Pablo Schiavi in 2012

Juan Pablo Schiavi (born June 10, 1957 in Buenos Aires) is an Argentine agronomist and politician who has held a wide range of positions at the top of national and municipal government of Argentina.

Following the resignation of Raúl Jaime in 2009, Schiavi was appointed Argentina's Ministry of Transportation. He left the position after the Once Tragedy of 2012, a product of infrastructure problems that were widely believed to be the result of corruption and negligence in his ministry. He was sentenced to 8 years imprisonment for his responsibility in the accident.

In an account of Schiavi's history of political loyalties, the newspaper La Nación described him as having been, in turn, a “Grossista” (a disciple of Carlos Grosso) a “Macrista” (Mauricio Macri), a “Telermanista” (Jorge Telerman), a “Devidista” (Julio De Vido), and finally a “Cristinista” (Cristina Fernandez de Kirchner).

== Early life and education ==
At age 15, he was active in the Montoneros, a left-wing urban guerrilla group. He went on to become a member of the militant Peronist Youth and belonged to a group of “angry militant Peronists” who made headlines when they tried to force their way into the Casa Rosada on 16 December 1982.

Schiavi received a degree in agricultural engineering at the University of Buenos Aires in 1985. Between 1983 and 1985 he did laboratory and field experiments involving wheat and corn for the National Institute of Agricultural Economics.

== Early career ==
In 1985 he became managing partner of a long-distance carrier and directed a study of agricultural advisers.

He won his first political office in 1987 when he served as a consultant to the Peronist bloc on the City Council of Buenos Aires.

While Carlos Grosso was Mayor of the City of Buenos Aires, he appointed Schiavi as Ministry of Maintenance Services for the municipality, which meant that he was “in charge of the lucrative agreements for the collection of waste.” The city's main waste-disposal contractor was Manliba, a firm that was a part of Grupo Macri-SOCMA. During this period Schiavi entered the orbit of the president of SOCMA, Mauricio Macri, for whom he would later work, and also developed a close relationship with SOCMA executive Daniel Chaín, who later became the city's Secretary of Urban Development. After Carlos Grosso, described by La Nación as “an icon of Peronist renovation,” left his job “amid a flood of corruption allegations,” Schiavi went into business with Chain, with whom he ran an architectural firm during most of the 1990s. Together they renovated some 30 train stations.

Later, when Macri went into municipal politics and ran for Mayor of Buenos Aires in 2003, Chain joined his campaign team and recommended that Macri hire Schiavi, who became Macri's campaign manager. Macri lost a runoff election for Mayor of Buenos Aires to Anibal Ibarra, but Schiavi stayed in his employ until 2005. While working as director of the city's Public Services Regulatory Authority, Schiavi met Ricardo Jaime and Julio De Vido, the latter of whom, according to La Nación, would become “his protector in the K world” (that is, the circle of politicians and business people surrounding the Kirchner government).

After this, Schiavi rejoined the Peronists in Buenos Aires. After Ibarra was removed from office, he was replaced by his deputy, Jorge Telerman, who in 2006 appointed Schiavi as Secretary of Planning and Public Works. Schiavi developed a relationship with Julio De Vido, the national Secretary of Federal Planning. When Macri became Mayor of Buenos Aires in 2007, De Vido summoned Schiavi to head Administration (ADIF), a state company that was created to promote investments.

== Ministry of Transport ==
On 1 July 2009, Raul Jaime resigned as Secretary of Transportation in the midst of a corruption scandal. He was replaced by Schiavi. The position placed Schiavi in control of a budget of over one billion pesos per month.

It was reported in February 2010 that Schiavi and Jaime were both being investigated, and had been subpoenaed, for illegally accepting free flights on airlines while they were working in the government. Schiavi had supposedly traveled without charge to Brazil with Jaime in September 2006, when Schiavi was Secretary of Planning and Public Works for Buenos Aires. Schiavi was still being investigated in 2012.

=== Once railway accident, resignation, and aftermath ===
On 22 February 2012, a train on the Sarmiento line in Buenos Aires crashed in the Once railway station, killing 51 people and injuring more than 700. It was the second-worst train disaster in Argentinian history. Schiavi was widely criticized by the public, as well as by both his own party and the opposition party, for saying on the day of the accident that the death toll would have been far lower if it had taken place a day earlier, during Carnaval, or on another public holiday.

The infrastructure deficiencies that made the disaster possible were blamed in large part on the corruption in the Ministry of Transportation. On 28 February, a news report described Schiavi as having been “caught in the eye of the storm since the train crash.” An account of a meeting between Schiavi and members of the press in the wake of the tragedy described the encounter as “just the latest example of a new norm in Argentina’s press life in which personalities call in the press to speak their truth and take no grilling.”

On 7 March, Schiavi handed in his resignation, stating in his letter that he was stepping down for medical reasons. “I am to be treated for a transluminal coronary angioplasty and another two simple angioplasties, which both require a minimum of sixty days of recovery time following medical advice,” he wrote. It was reported, however, that Schiavi had been forced out, and that his boss, de Vido, had phoned him and told him that the President had said he “had to go.”

As part of the judicial investigation, Federal Judge Claudio Bonadio prohibited Schiavi from leaving the country. In October, Schiavi was among those indicted on various charges in connection with the accident.

It was widely noted that the Once accident was not an isolated incident. In the first half of 2012, “there were more than 1,200 accidents and 190 deaths on Argentina’s main train lines,” reported the Christian Science Monitor in 2013, which added that the families of victims blamed their deaths on the Fernandez de Kirchner government, saying it had failed to act to improve a severely deteriorated system featuring “decrepit” tracks. “Once is the best example of Kirchnerism’s failure to act,” Leandro Bullor, an analyst at the University of Buenos Aires, told the Monitor.

Two years after the Once disaster, in March 2014, Schiavi, Jaime, and other officials went on trial for having played roles in the corruption, incompetence, and negligence that were said to have led to the incident. Judge Bonadio, who had conducted the investigation into the causes of the tragedy, attributed it to “sinister officials and trade unionists.” Testifying in April, Schiavi denied that he was not guilty of negligence and dissociated himself from the tragedy. “I will not take criminal responsibility for something I did not commit and did not cause,” he said. However, he admitted that the company that been operating the Sarmiento line at the time of the disaster, Trenes de Buenos Aires (TBA), “was a bad concessionary.”

== Personal life ==
His nickname is “Juampi” and La Nación has said that his main political asset seems to be his “versatility” or “gelatin-like quality.”
