= Telescoping (rail cars) =

Type of railway accident

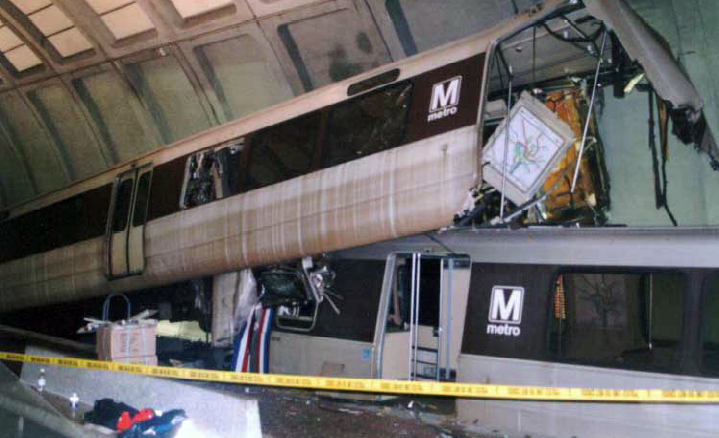
Cars of the Washington Metro were telescoped in this November 3, 2004 accident at Woodley Park station.

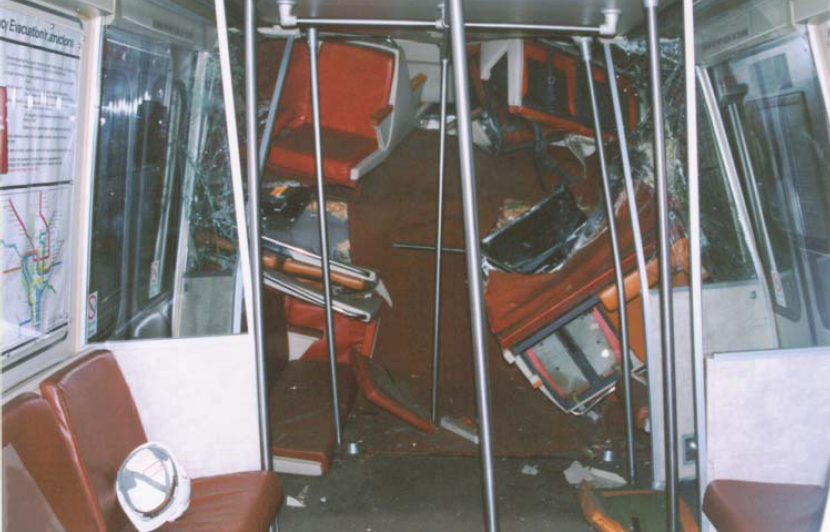
Interior of Washington Metro car 1077 following telescoping in a head-on collision. This car sustained a loss of 34 linear feet (10 m) of passenger compartment space (nearly half the car) due to telescoping.

In a railway accident, telescoping occurs when the underframe of one vehicle overrides that of another, and smashes through the second vehicle's body. The term is derived from the resulting appearance of the two vehicle bodies: the body of one vehicle may appear to be slid inside the other like the tubes of a collapsible telescope – the body sides, roof and underframe of the latter vehicle being forced apart from each other.

== Description ==
Telescoping often results in heavy fatalities if the cars telescoped are fully occupied. The car riding on top will often destroy the structure of the car below, crushing those on board (although the physics of the incident may reverse the cars' roles). The chances of telescoping can be reduced by use of anticlimbers and other structural systems which direct crash energy and debris away from the passenger and crew areas. One such energy absorbing system is the Green Buffer, winners of the 2023 Swedish Steel Prize, where a collapsing steel structure in the buffers dissipate energy similarly to the crumple zones used in the automotive industry.

To reduce the chance of telescoping, rail and tramway vehicles are often provided with an "anticlimber": a horizontally ridged plate at the end of the chassis, which in a collision will engage with the anticlimber on the next car.

== Examples ==
Accidents where telescoping occurred are numerous and include:

- 1864 Shohola train wreck
- 1888 Mud Run disaster
- 1905 Hall Road rail accident
- 1907 Canaan train wreck
- 1928 Times Square derailment
- 1945 Michigan train wreck
- 1947 Camp Mountain rail accident
- 1952 Harrow and Wealdstone rail crash
- 1957 Lewisham rail crash
- 1962 Rail accidents in Winsford
- 1970 Benavídez rail disaster
- 1972 Chicago commuter rail crash
- 1981 Seer Green rail crash
- 1987 Bintaro train crash
- 1990 Ursus rail crash
- 2008 Chatsworth train collision
- 2009 Washington Metro train collision
- 2012 Buenos Aires rail disaster
- 2026 Bekasi train crash

== Gallery ==
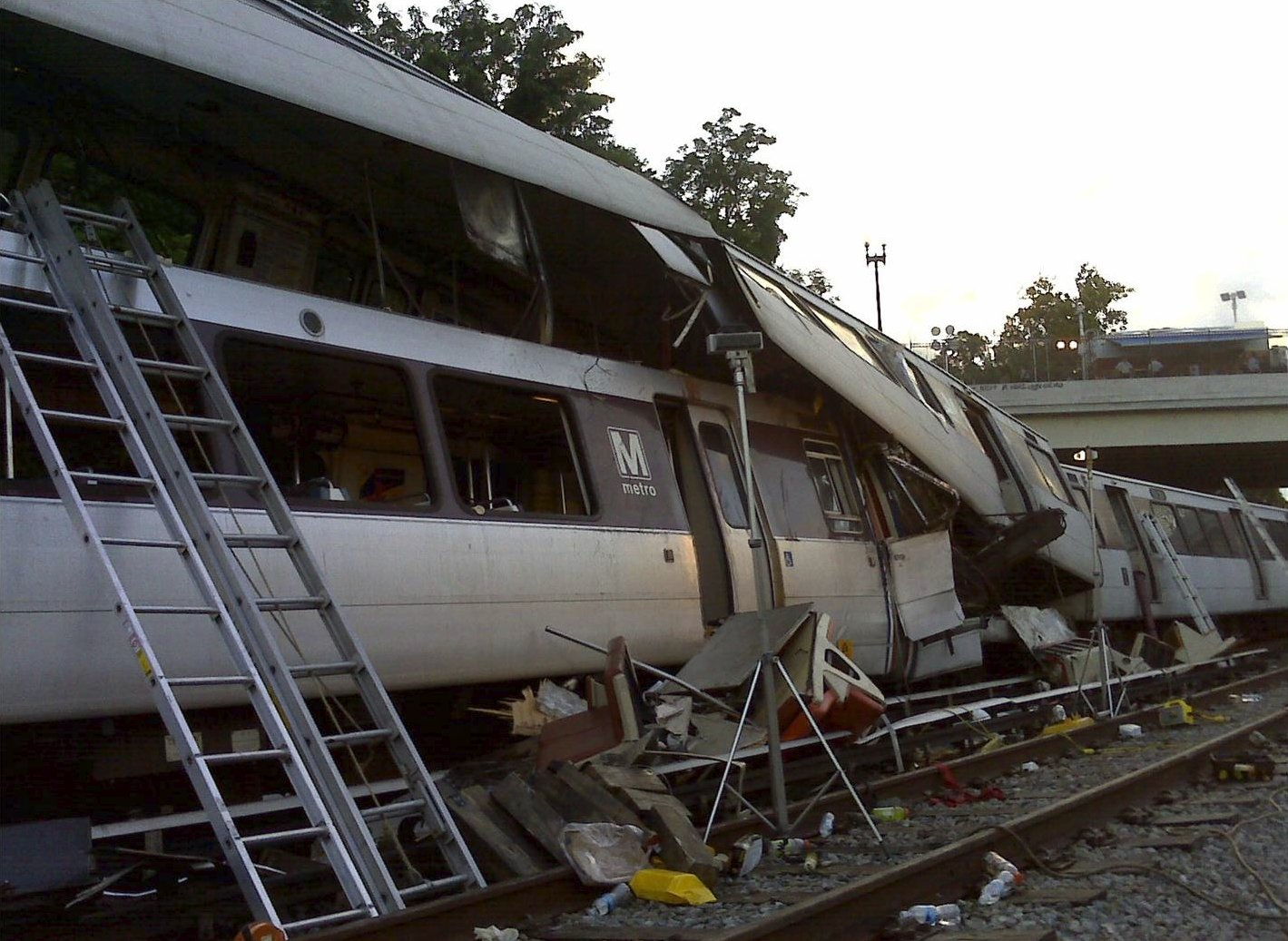
The aftermath of the June 2009 Washington Metro train collision

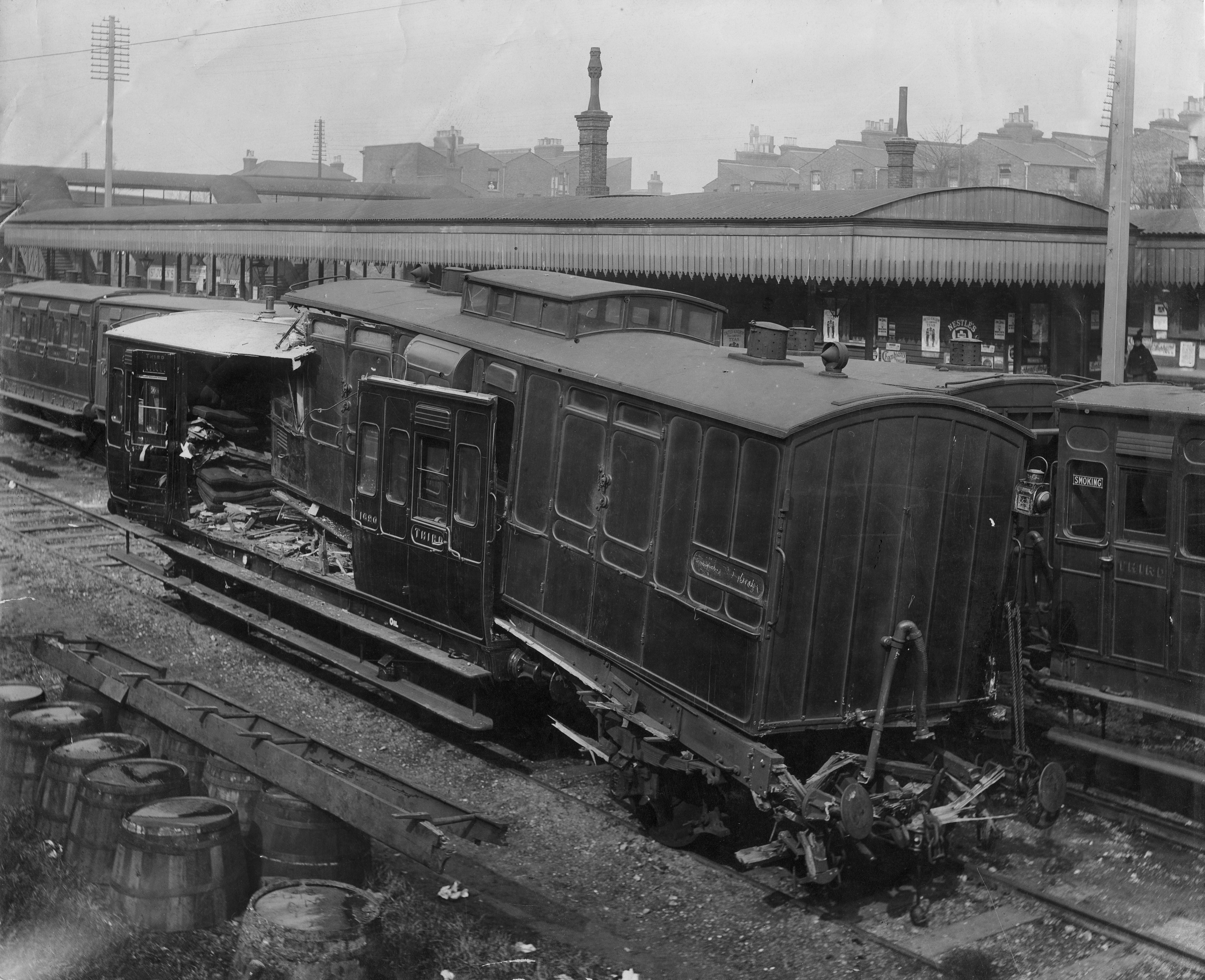
The aftermath of the 1898 St Johns rail accident, where the rear two carriages of a passenger train were telescoped by being hit at 8 mph (13 km/h) by a following train.

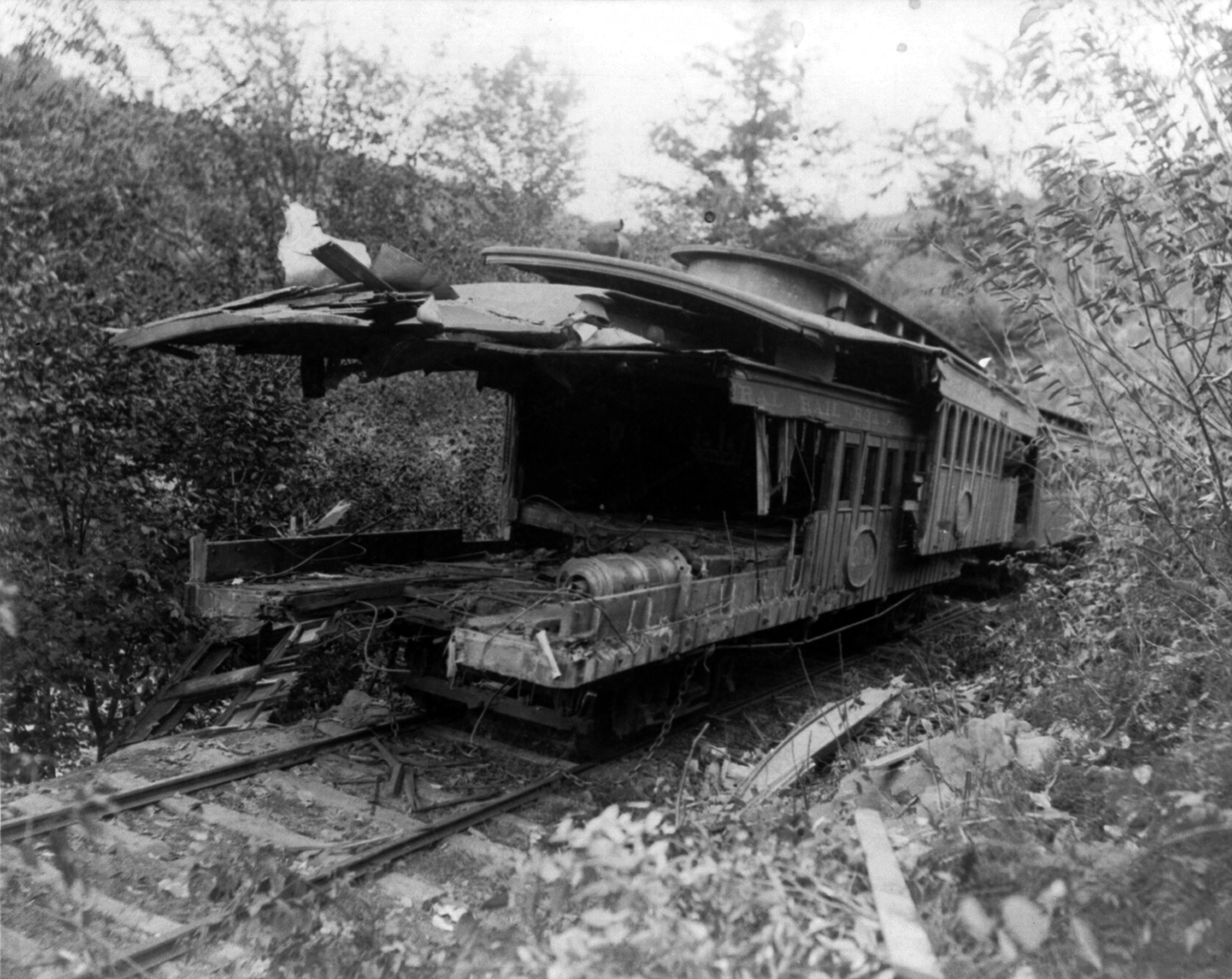
Cars involved in the Mud Run disaster, October 10, 1888

== See also ==
- Buff strength
- Crashworthiness
- EN 15227, a European standard about the crashworthiness requirements for railway vehicle bodies
