= 2012 Buenos Aires rail disaster =

Fatal Argentine train wreck

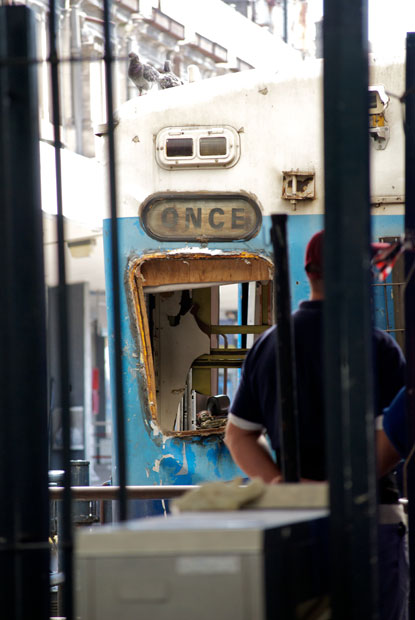
- The train after crashing

Details
- Date: 22 February 2012; 08:33 ART
- Location: Buenos Aires
- Coordinates: 34°36′31″S 58°24′27″W
- Country: Argentina
- Line: Sarmiento Line
- Operator: Trenes de Buenos Aires
- Incident type: Train wreck
- Cause: Motorman error, brake failure

Statistics
- Trains: 1 (ART Rapid Transit Train)
- Deaths: 51
- Injured: 703
Location of the Once railway station
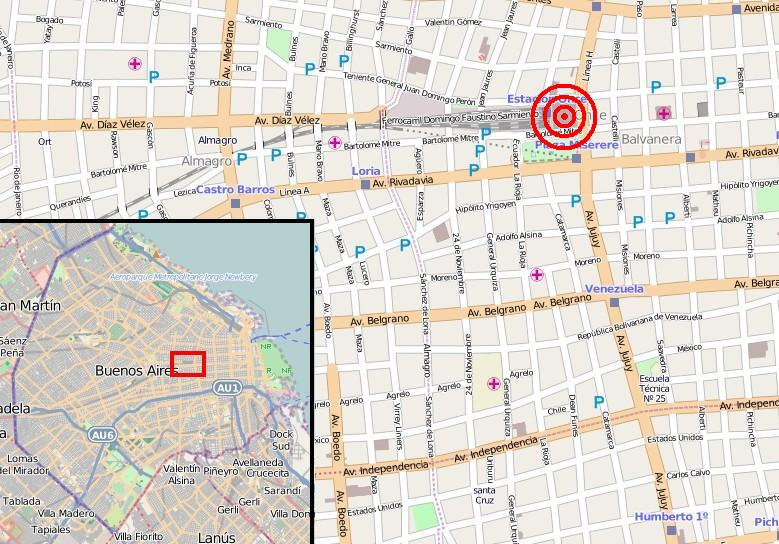

The 2012 Buenos Aires rail disaster, also known as the Once Tragedy, occurred on 22 February 2012, when a train crashed at Once Station (Spanish: Estación Once de Septiembre; IPA: [ˈonse]) in the Balvanera neighbourhood of Buenos Aires, Argentina.

There were about 1,000 passengers on board when the crowded eight-carriage train, whose working brakes were not activated, hit the buffers at the end of the line, crushing the motor carriage and the following two carriages, after approaching the station at a speed of 26 km/h (16 mph). Fifty-one people were killed and more than 700 were injured; the dead and seriously injured were in the first two carriages, which were packed with people who had moved to the front of the train to be near the station exit on arrival.

The Sarmiento Line, on which the incident occurred, was operated by Trenes de Buenos Aires (TBA), owned by the Cirigliano brothers. It was the second fatal accident on the line within six months, following the September 2011 Flores rail crash, and the third-deadliest train accident in Argentina's history, after the Benavídez rail disaster in 1970 (which left 236 dead and 368 injured) and the Sa Pereira rail disaster in 1978 (which left 55 dead).

== Incident ==
Train number 16 was operating the Sarmiento Line local service 3772 from Moreno to Once during the morning rush hour on the first working day after a Carnival holiday. The train was reported to be traveling too fast — about 50 km/h (30 mph) — on entry to the station. It failed to stop before the end of the track at Once Station and at 8:33 ART crashed into the buffer stops at a speed of 20 km/h (12 mph). The motor carriage and the following two carriages were crushed; the second carriage was telescoped 7 metres (23 ft) into the first. Several passengers described the impact as an explosion.

== Emergency response ==
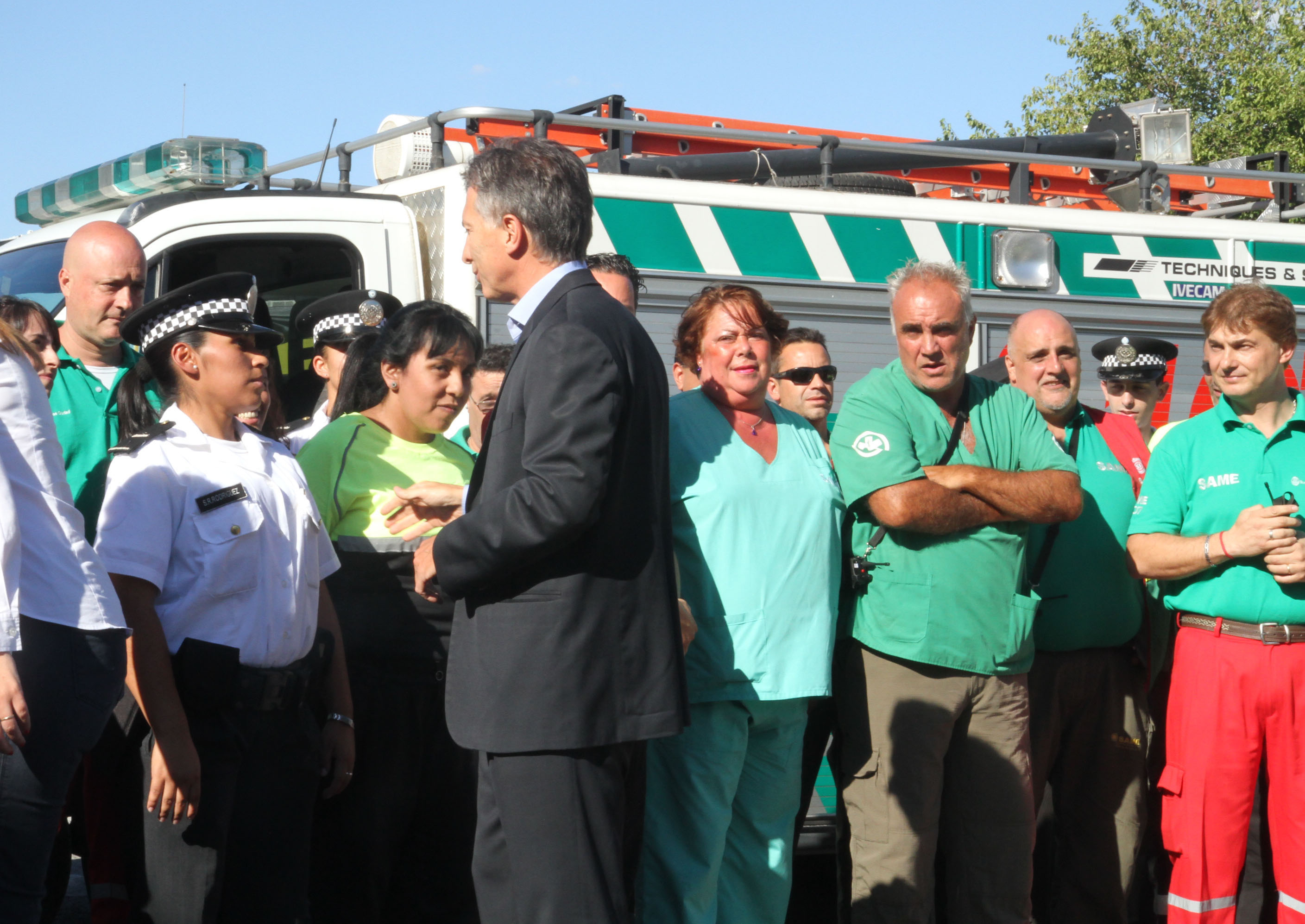
Buenos Aires' then-chief of government Mauricio Macri thanking the rescuers

Several ambulances were in the area at the time of the accident, waiting for a ship that had suffered an influenza B outbreak, and were used to transport victims to nearby hospitals. People with minor injuries left the accident zone on foot. According to the city's head of civil defence, the rescue was difficult because the hard and complicated structure of the carriages made the task of removing the wreckage difficult.

The train driver survived the crash; he was rescued and evacuated in an ambulance. It took many people to free him from the wreckage. He was not seriously injured, and a test for blood alcohol content gave a negative result.

The Sarmiento Line did not resume normal operation for several hours. People demanding the reopening of the line threw bottles, sticks and chairs at federal police and soldiers guarding the crash site, though police regained control within a few minutes.

Fifty-one people, including three children, were confirmed dead. More than 700 others were injured. The crash scene and audio logs were examined to determine the cause of the accident.

== Reactions ==
=== Domestic ===
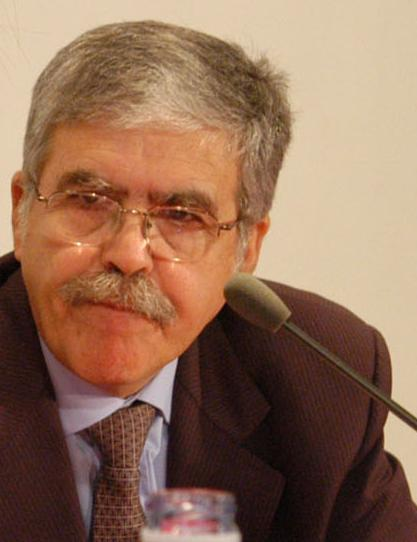
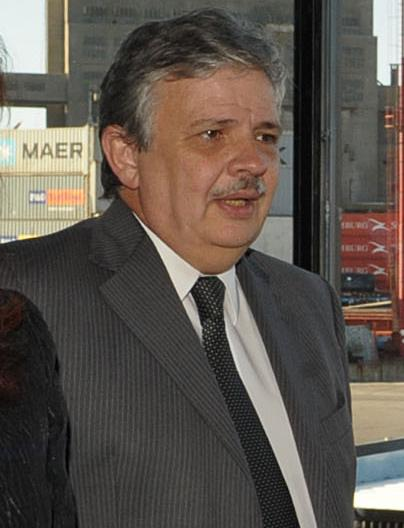
Minister of Planning and Public Investment Julio de Vido (left) and Secretary of Transport Juan Pablo Schiavi (right) were two of the politicians prosecuted as responsibles for the tragedy

Argentine President Cristina Fernández de Kirchner declared two days of national mourning and suspended the Carnival festivities. Mauricio Macri, the chief of government of the autonomous city of Buenos Aires, and the governor of Buenos Aires Province, Daniel Scioli, did the same.

Secretary of Transport Juan Pablo Schiavi announced that the government will investigate the accident. He reported that the driver was well rested at the time of the accident and had very good labour reports. The train's and station's black box and the security tapes were handed to a Federal Judge. Minister of Planning and Public Investment Julio de Vido announced that the presidency would initiate a lawsuit against TBA, the owners of the Sarmiento line, but that was not accepted by the Justice Department, arguing that government officials could also have broad responsibilities in the accident.

The Radical Civic Union proposed the impeachment of Schiavi, requesting explanations about the state of railway lines, and pointing to previous complaints about the lack of proper state control over the working of the lines. They also urged Congress to create a commission to investigate the case and the responsibilities of the government. The Civic Coalition criticized De Vido's announcement, pointing out that the state cannot be plaintiff as it is involved in the case. The General Confederation of Labour complained about the overall poor condition of the railways, saying that the accident highlighted the problem. The Argentine Workers' Central Union requested the removal of the TBA administration of the train.

=== International ===
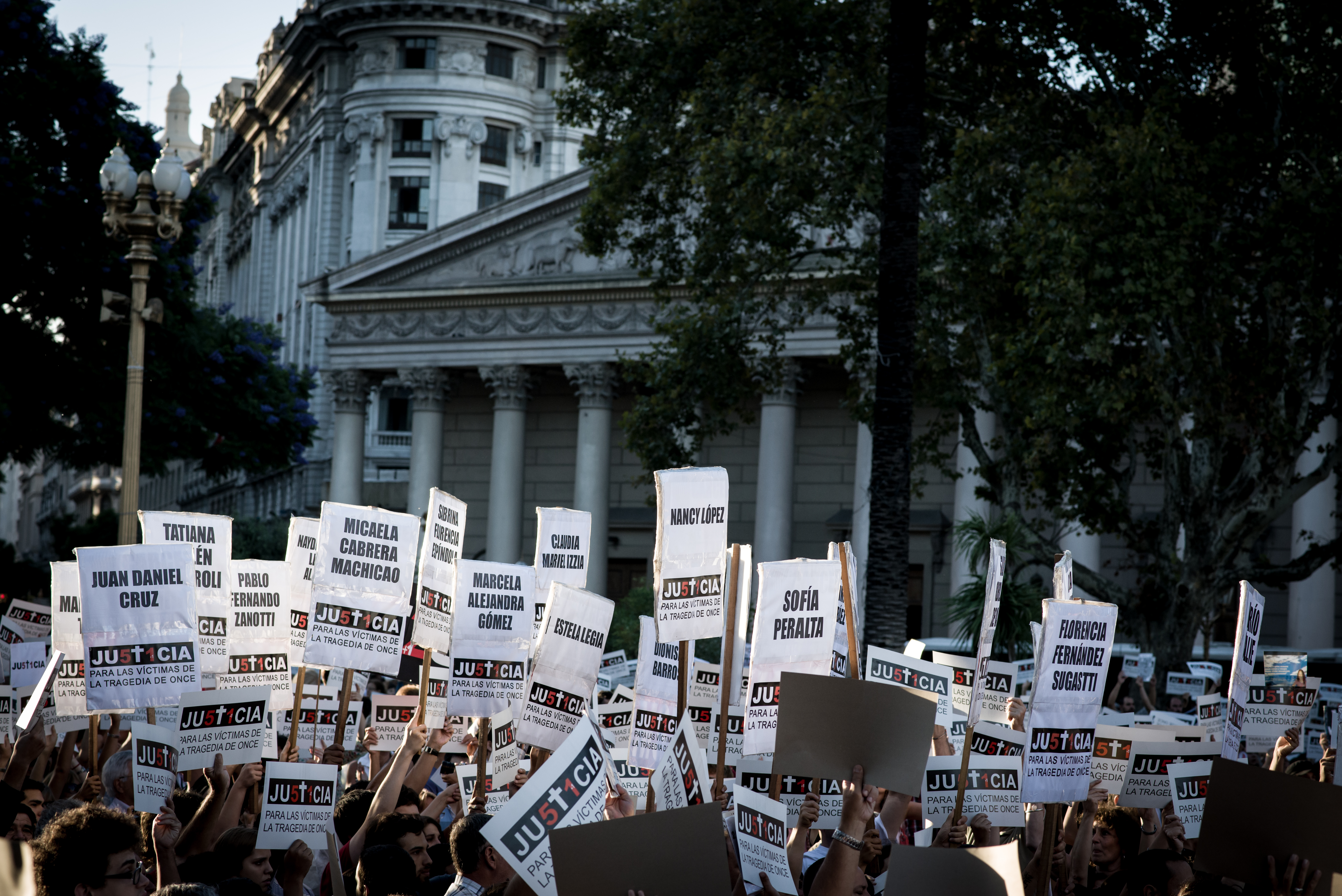
Protest asking for justice in February 2013

The Foreign and Commonwealth Office of the United Kingdom regretted the incident and expressed its condolences to the "families of the victims" and the "emergency agencies that are still working to aid" those in the accident. The Secretariat of Foreign Affairs of Mexico sent its condolences to the "sister country of Argentina" and hoped for the "speedy recovery of the families and those injured." Pope Benedict XVI sent his condolences.

== Investigation ==
Initially a union leader said that the train had been working well, and there had been no problems with the brakes at previous stations. Some passengers reported the same. The driver, 28-year-old Marcos Antonio Córdoba, was taken into custody but later released by the investigating judge over the objections of the prosecutor after declaring under oath "I tried to brake twice, but the mechanism failed." He also activated the hand brake, which also failed. A judicial source said Cordoba told investigators: "At each station he advised the dispatcher by radio that he had problems with the brakes." He reportedly said he was told to keep going.

An event in Plaza de Mayo was arranged for 22 February 2014, to mark the second anniversary of the crash.

== Trial ==
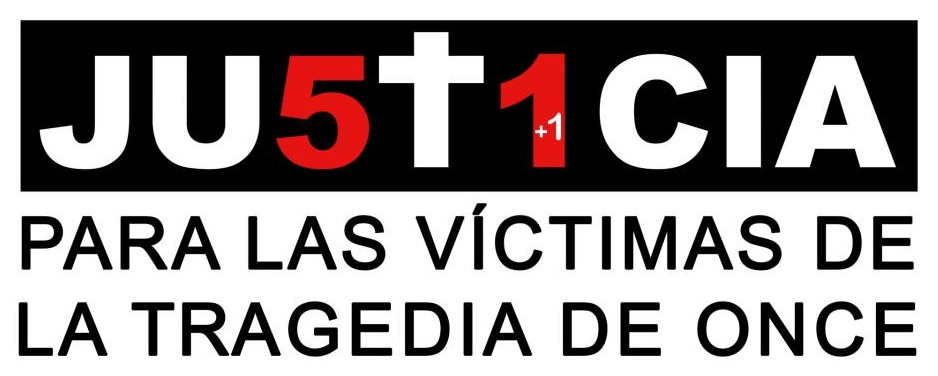
The "5†1" logo displaying the number of victims in the accident became popular in protests and other public acts asking for justice

On March 18, 2014, the trial began before the Federal Oral Criminal Court No. 2 (TOCF2), made up of judges Rodrigo Giménez Uriburu, Jorge Alberto Tassara and Jorge Luciano Gorini.

In the trial, two facts were judged: on the one hand, the accident, with its sequel of deaths and injuries, and on the other hand, whether there was fraudulent administration in the administration of the railway company and ministerial management.

The trial lasted almost two years. Among the most relevant acts is the court's decision to reject the conclusions of four of the six experts (engineers Horacio Faggiani, Julio César Pastine, Alejandro Héctor Leonetti and Raúl Díaz) and request that they be prosecuted for false testimony, which Judge Bonadío did. In this context, the expert engineer Leonetti was arrested by the court. Two years later the four experts would be acquitted.

On 29 December 2015, the sentence was issued, resulting in the conviction of 21 people and the acquittal of seven. Sergio Cirigliano, one of the owners of TBA, was sentenced to nine years in prison. Juan Pablo Schiavi, former Secretary of Transportation, was sentenced to eight years in prison and a lifelong ban on public office. Ricardo Jaime, another former Secretary of Transportation, got six years of prison and the same ban. Marcos Córdoba, the driver, was sentenced to three years and six months in prison and also banned from driving trains for six years.
