= Benavídez rail disaster =

Train wreck in Argentina in 1970

Coordinates: 34°25′21″S 58°40′05″W

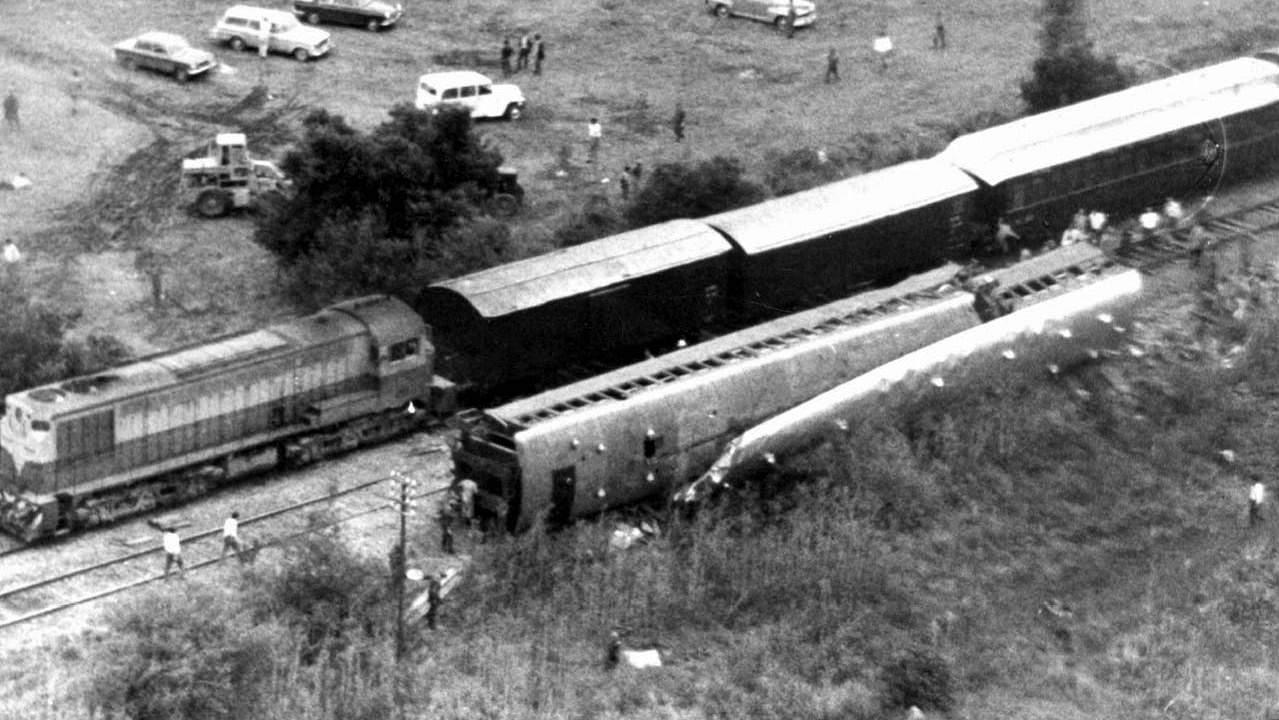
- Crashed and derailed trains

Details
- Date: February 1, 1970; 20:15
- Location: Benavídez
- Country: Argentina
- Operator: Ferrocarriles Argentinos
- Incident type: Rear collision
- Cause: failure to protect stopped train

Statistics
- Trains: 2
- Passengers: 1,350
- Crew: 4
- Deaths: 236
- Injured: 500

The Benavídez rail disaster, which occurred on February 1, 1970, is the worst-ever rail disaster in Argentina and South America, leaving 236 dead and more than 500 injured.

== Summary ==
This accident happened in an isolated, dimly lit area near Benavídez station, between Ingeniero Maschwitz and General Pacheco, 29 kilometres (18 mi) north of Buenos Aires. A 21-carriage mixed passenger and freight General Bartolomé Mitre Railway express, (Estrella del Norte) operated by State-owned Ferrocarriles Argentinos, hauled by two diesel locomotives and carrying 260 passengers, was nearing the end of its 1,000-mile journey from Tucumán to Retiro in Buenos Aires and had just passed Benavídez.

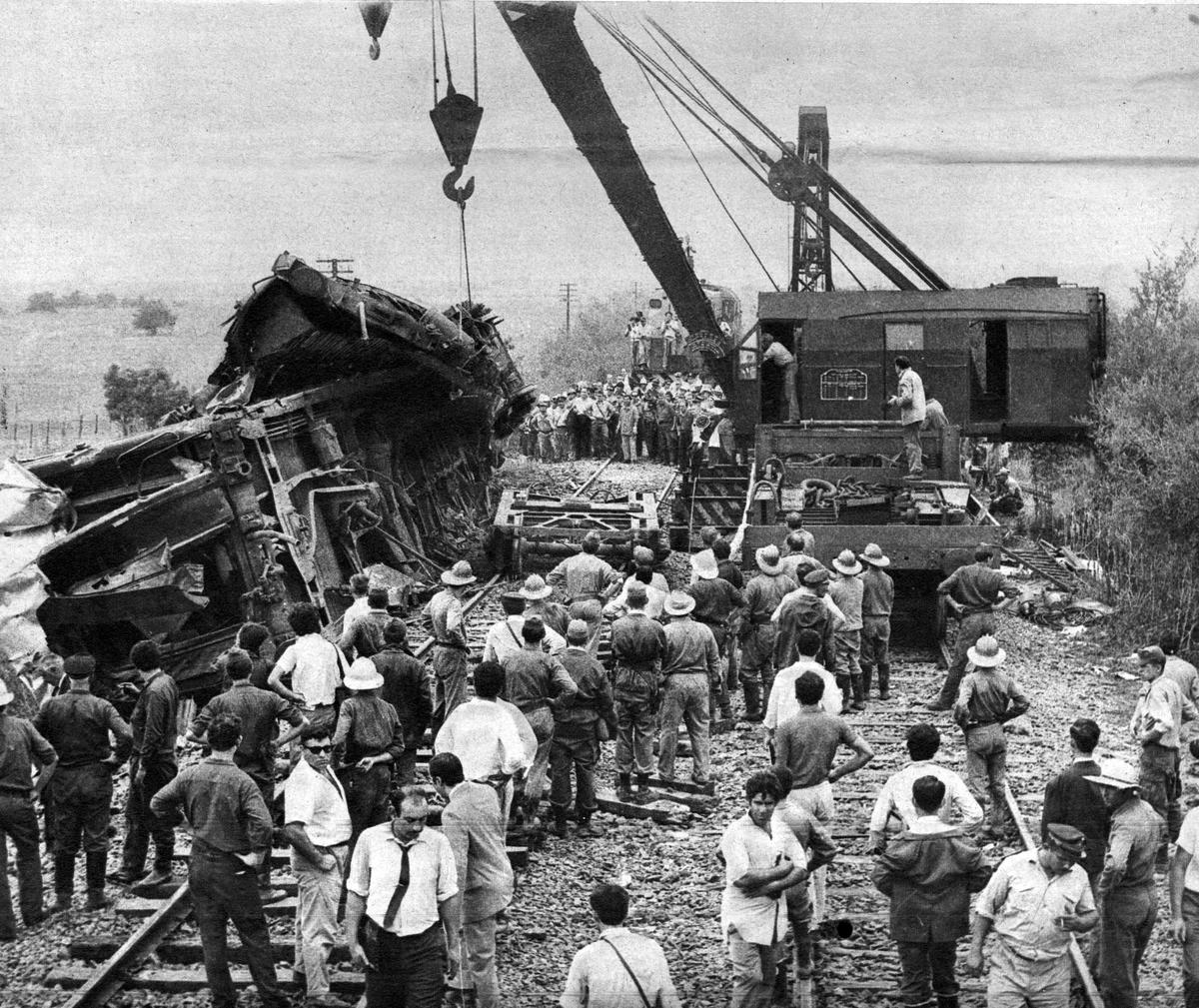
Workers operating a crane to remove derailed coaches

Ahead of it, a ten-carriage local train, which was carrying 1,090 passengers home to the capital after spending a weekend in fashionable Zárate on the banks of the Paraná River, had come to a halt due to 'fuel injector trouble'. Despite being stopped for 40 minutes as they tried to fix the problem, the crew of the local train failed to provide protection and at 20:15 the express ran into the back of it at a speed of 65 mph. The two diesel locomotives 'totally destroyed' the rear car and telescoped the next car through almost the entire length of the third from rear car, pushing it 80 yards down the track, though some passengers managed to jump clear. All the deaths and major injuries were aboard the local train.

The pilot of an aeroplane radioed a control tower, who in turn notified emergency services. Air Force helicopters were used to bring medical supplies. An emergency hospital was established at the Pacheco station, five miles north of the accident site, and temporary morgues were set up at Pacheco and Benavídez.

Survivors quoted in The Times said, 'We saw mutilated bodies everywhere', there was 'blood all over the place, the soldiers were just filling sacks with severed limbs'.

In all 236 people were killed and more than 500 injured.

After the accident Así, a popular weekly magazine, published a 32-page article including gory photographs of the train crash and as a result was closed indefinitely by the military dictatorship that governed Argentina at the time.

== Bibliography ==
- Railway Wrecks by Edgar A. Haine, 1993, ISBN 0-8453-4844-2, pp. 144-145
