= Trenes de Buenos Aires =

Argentinian rail transport company, 1995–2012

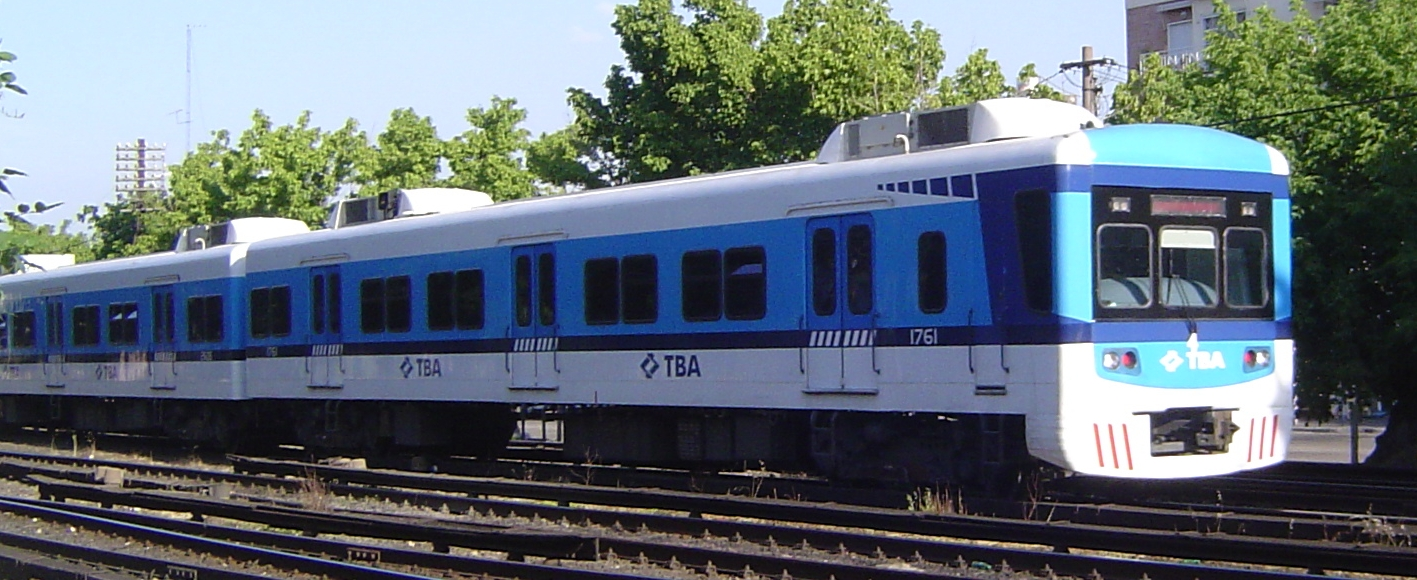
- A Sarmiento line electric train in 2007.
- Company type: Sociedad Anónima
- Industry: Public transport
- Predecessor: FEMESA
- Founded: 1995
- Founder: Claudio and Mario Cirigliano
- Defunct: 2012; 14 years ago
- Fate: Dissolved
- Successor: UGOMS
- Headquarters: Argentina
- Area served: City of Buenos Aires; Greater Buenos Aires
- Services: Rail transport
- Net income: US$135,1 million (1998)
- Owner: Grupo Plaza
- Number of employees: 4,340
- Divisions: Mitre; Sarmiento

Trenes de Buenos Aires (TBA) (In English: Trains of Buenos Aires) was a private company that operated commuter rail services over the 5 ft 6 in (1,676 mm) broad gauge Sarmiento and Mitre lines of Buenos Aires. The company, owned by Claudio and Mario Cirigliano, also operated long-distance services on the General Mitre Railway to central-western Argentina and on the General Urquiza Railway to northern Argentina and Uruguay on the international Tren de los Pueblos Libres.

From 2004 to 2012 TBA, a company which is a subsidiary of the Plaza Group controlled by the Cirigliano family, was part of the consortium Unidad de Gestión Operativa Ferroviaria de Emergencia (UGOFE) which operated other commuter rail services in Buenos Aires. The company became synonymous with the collapse of the railways in Argentina under privatisation and the company was subject to numerous investigations and legal proceedings.

== History ==
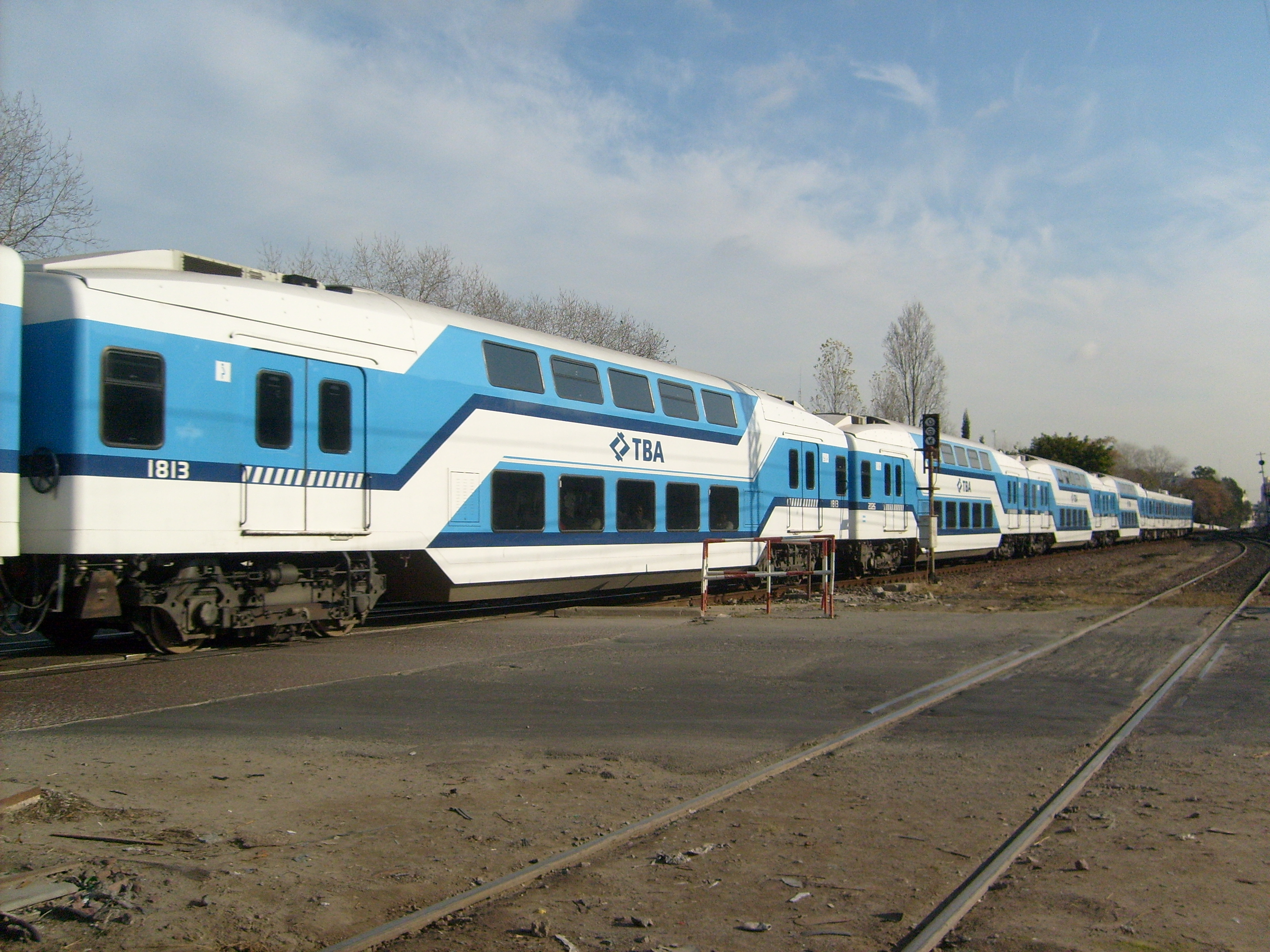
Double decker carriages made by Emprendimientos Ferroviarios for TBA.

TBA was established in 1995 after the Carlos Menem's administration privatised all the railway network, giving the company a concession to operate the metropolitan Mitre and Sarmiento railway lines by Decree N° 730/95. The company took over both lines on 27 May 1995.

During the first two years of the concession, TBA met the requirements specified on the contract, regarding the frequency of the service, with an average of 98%. By February 1999 the consortium had invested US$200 million, which included the reconstruction of 220 Toshiba carriages and the remodelling of 13 stations and workshops. In addition, a new ticket selling system was introduced with the installation of automated counters.

One of the most notable improvements was the introduction of "Puma" coaches on the Retiro-Tigre branch. Those coaches had been built by local factory Emprendimientos Ferroviarios (EMFER) and featured air conditioning, ABS brakes and computer-supervising systems.

In 1997 the Government decided to modify the contracts of concession with a plan of modernisation worth US$2.5 billion. The future investments required the acquisition of 492 brand-new electric multiple units, refurbishing of more than 100 km of existing tracks, and the installation of new signalling, among other improvements.

Nevertheless, the Government of Fernando De la Rúa (who had come to power in 1999) made changes to the original project, reducing the amount of the budget to US$1.3 billion. As compensation to the companies, the State provided subsidies to TBA and the other private operators.

In addition to the commuter rail services on Sarmiento and Mitre Lines, TBA also operated long-distance passenger trains on the General Mitre Railway from Retiro to the cities of Rosario, Santa Fe, and points between, in northern Argentina. Including all its commuter and long-distance services, the company ran approximately 1,000 trains per day and carried about 147.7 million passengers annually, or 500,000 daily.

From 2004 the company also formed part of Unidad de Gestión Operativa Ferroviaria de Emergencia (UGOFE), a consortium with railway companies Metrovías and Ferrovías, which took over the running of commuter rail services on Belgrano Sur, Roca and San Martín lines in Buenos Aires after concessions granted to Metropolitano S.A. for the operation of these services were revoked.

=== Revocation of concession ===
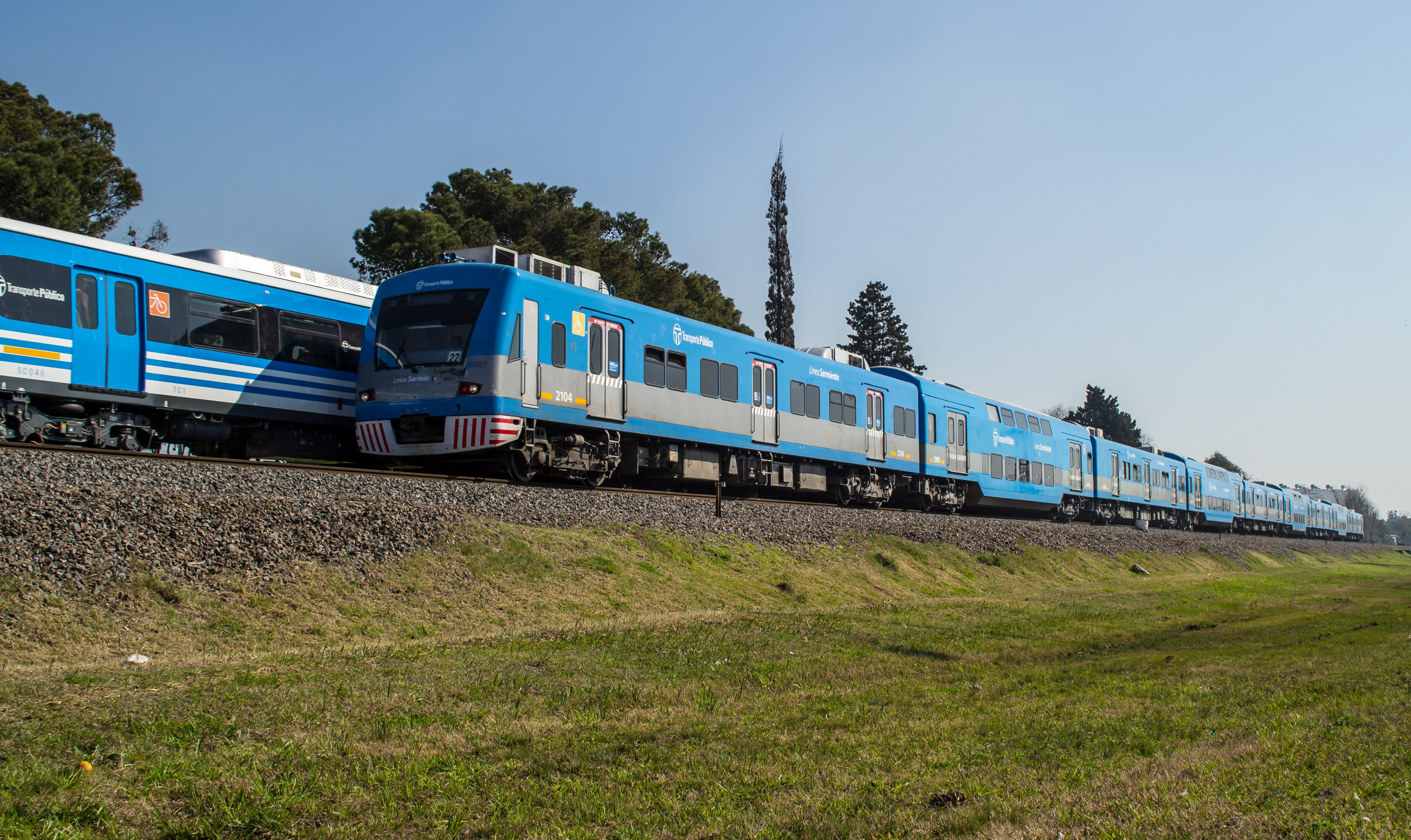
Puma train in Trenes Argentinos livery, being retired from service (2014).

Following a commuter train accident on 22 February 2012, at Once Station, Buenos Aires, in which 51 people died and at least 703 people were injured, TBA was placed under federal intervention on 28 February. Its concessions to operate the Mitre and Sarmiento lines were revoked on 24 May. After the cancellation of the contact, both lines were taken over by the consortium Unidad de Gestión Operativa Mitre Sarmiento (UGOMS) and later Trenes Argentinos, putting them back in state hands.

In October 2015, an exposé in the conservative daily newspaper La Nación highlighted the firm's apparent mismanagement while in charge of the commuter rail lines. The article revealed large expenditures by the private company on luxury items including jewellery and champagne, as well as trips to Doha and Dubai. At the same time, the company was still under investigation into the Once Tragedy and still had AR$ 70 million worth of unpaid fines as a result of its business practices. It was also revealed that the company had bribed the former transport minister Ricardo Jaime, who was also under investigation.

Sergio Cigliano, one of the owners of TBA, was convicted and sentenced to nine years in prison for negligence surrounding the original accident which had resulted in the revocation of concession.

== Gallery ==
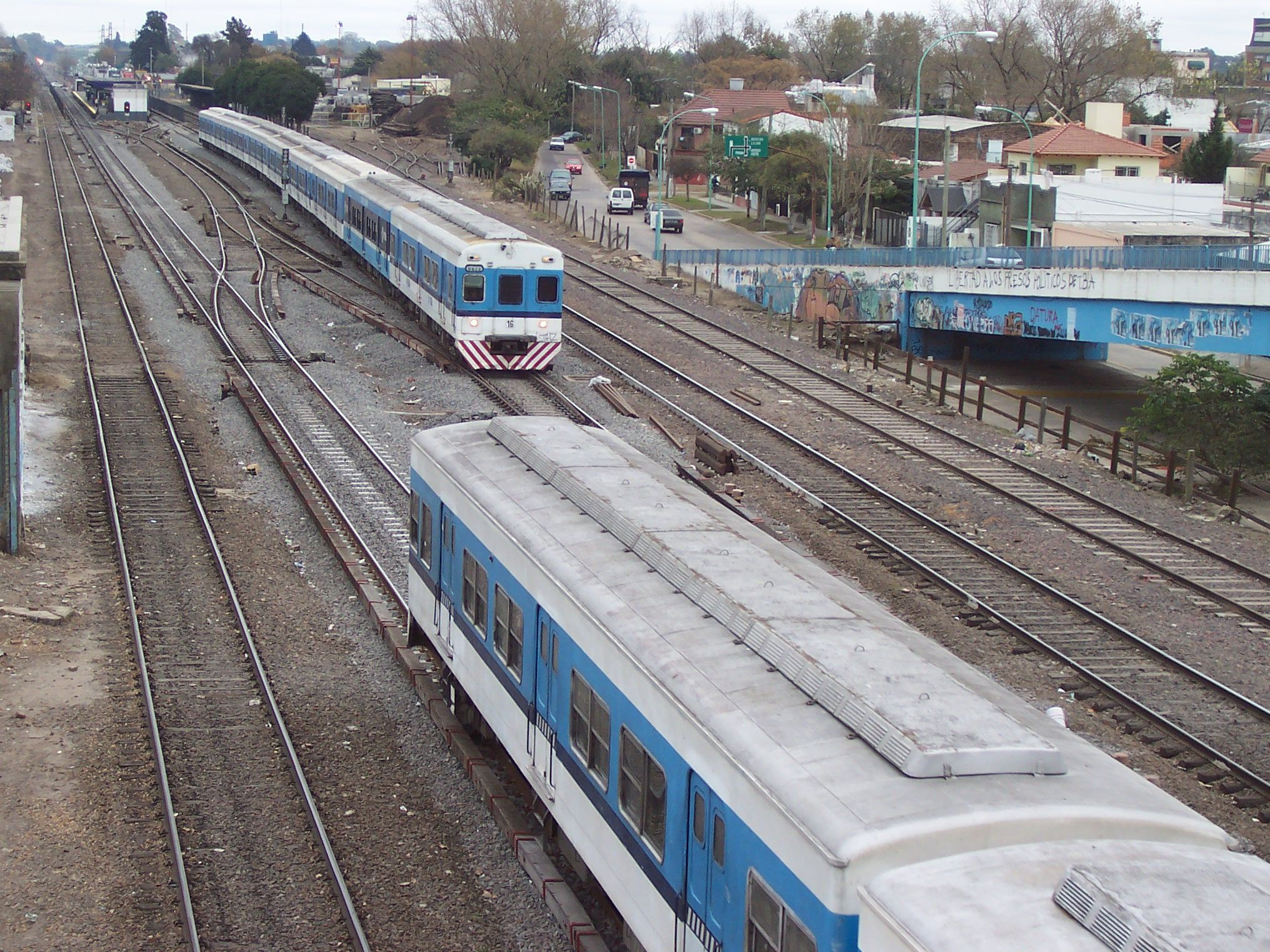

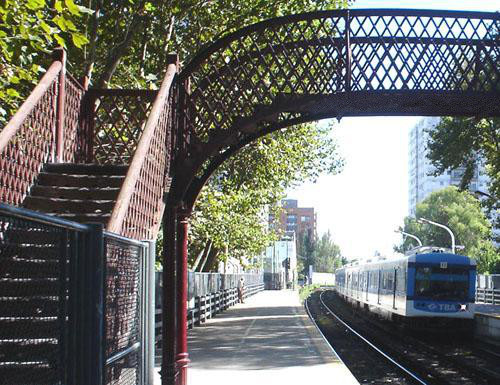

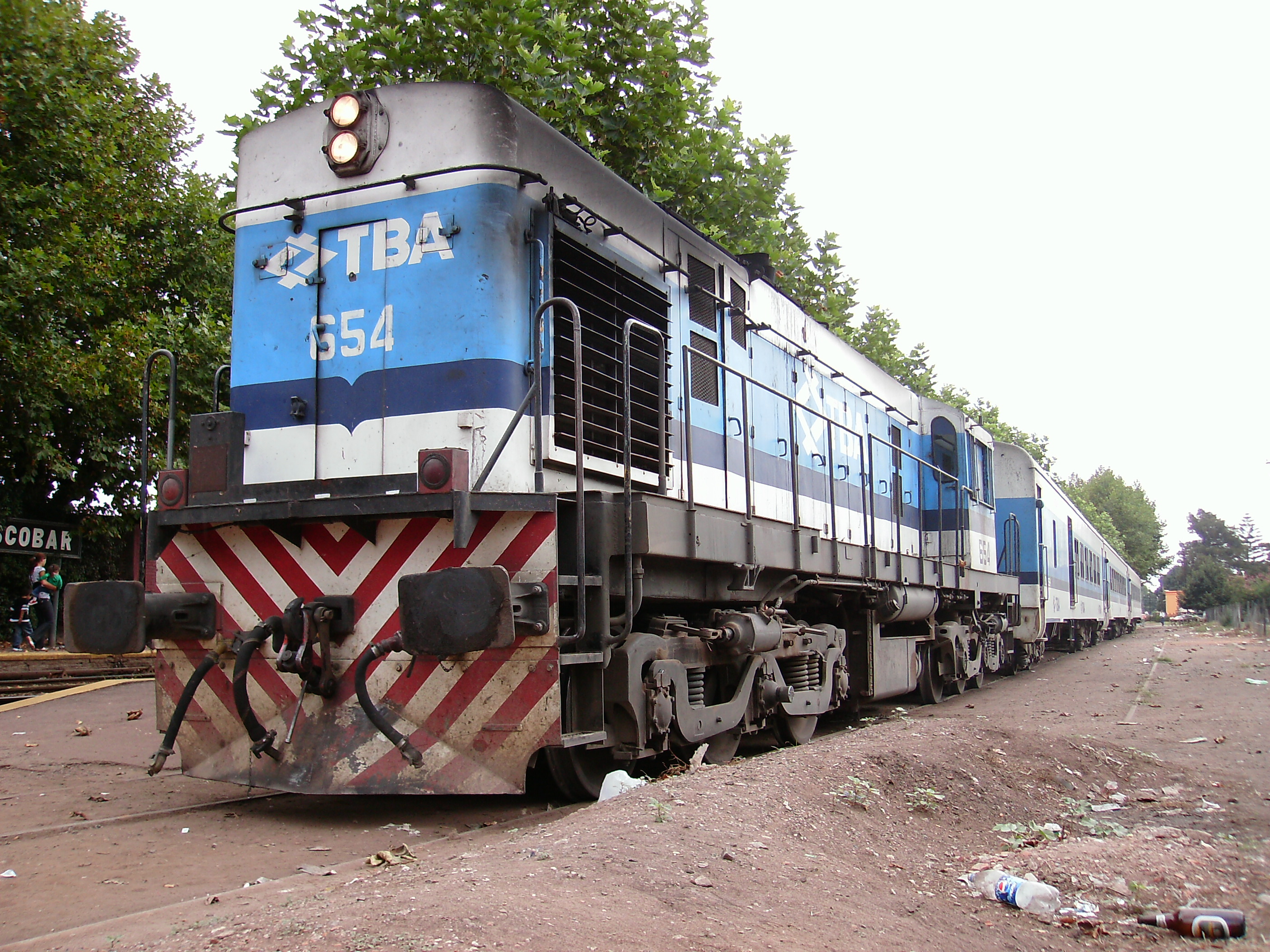

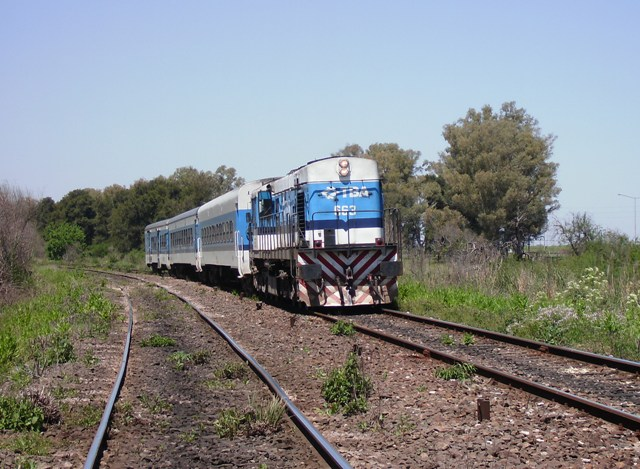

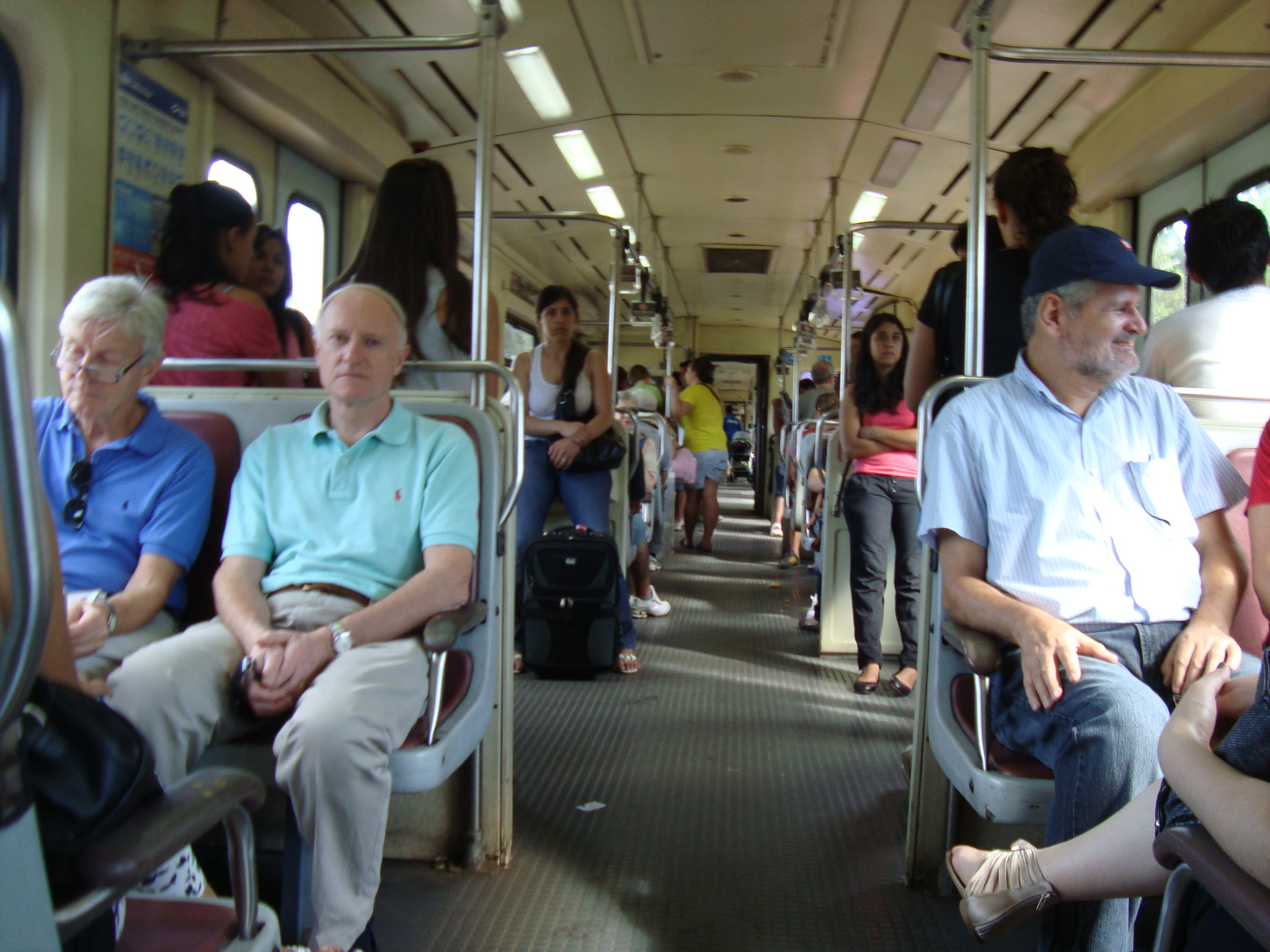

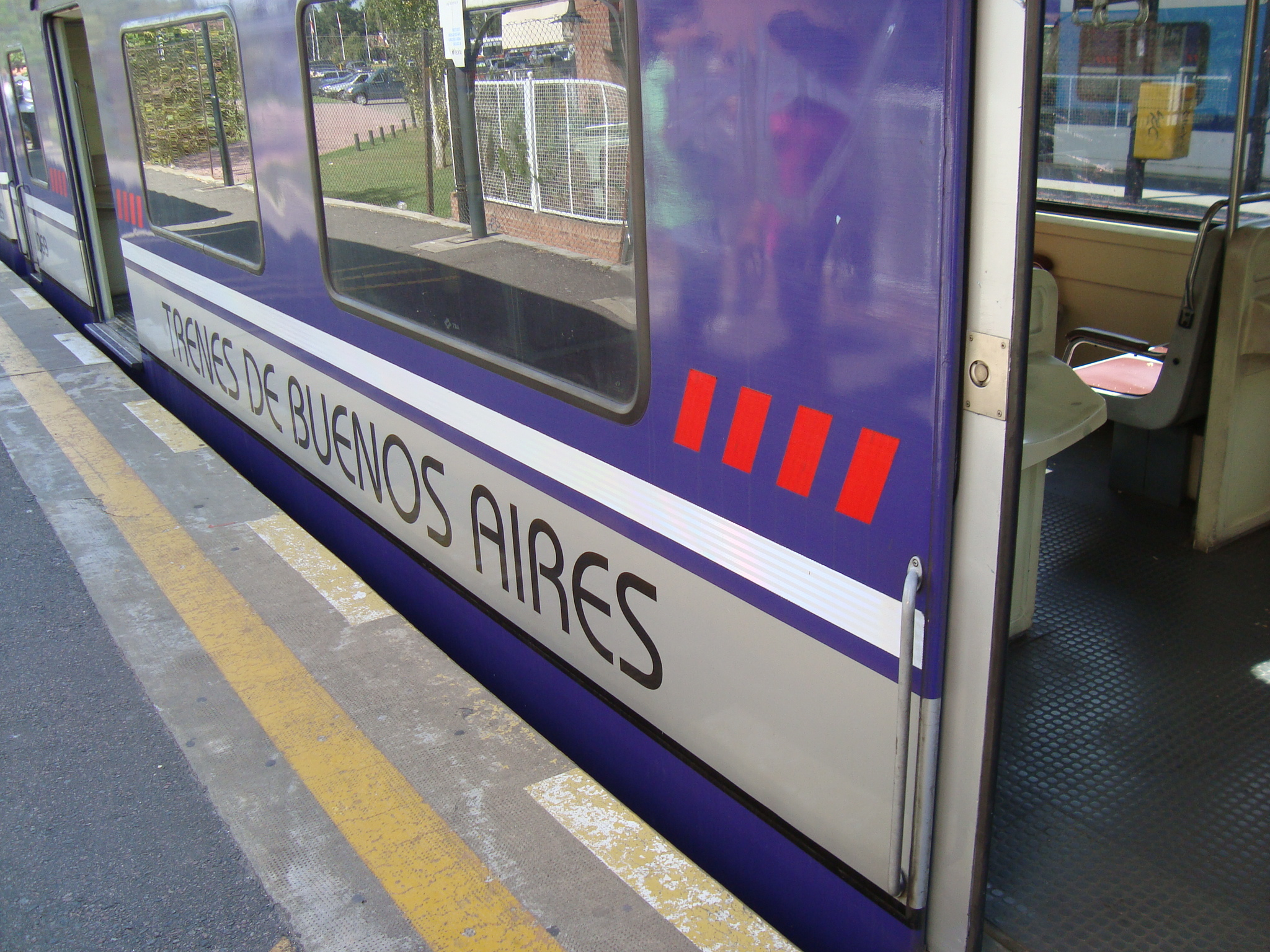

== See also ==
- Rail transport in Argentina
- Railway privatisation in Argentina
