= Santa Fe Urban Train =

Former commuter rail serving Santa Fe city, Argentina (2016–2019)

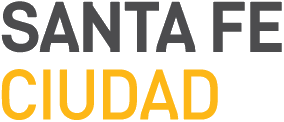

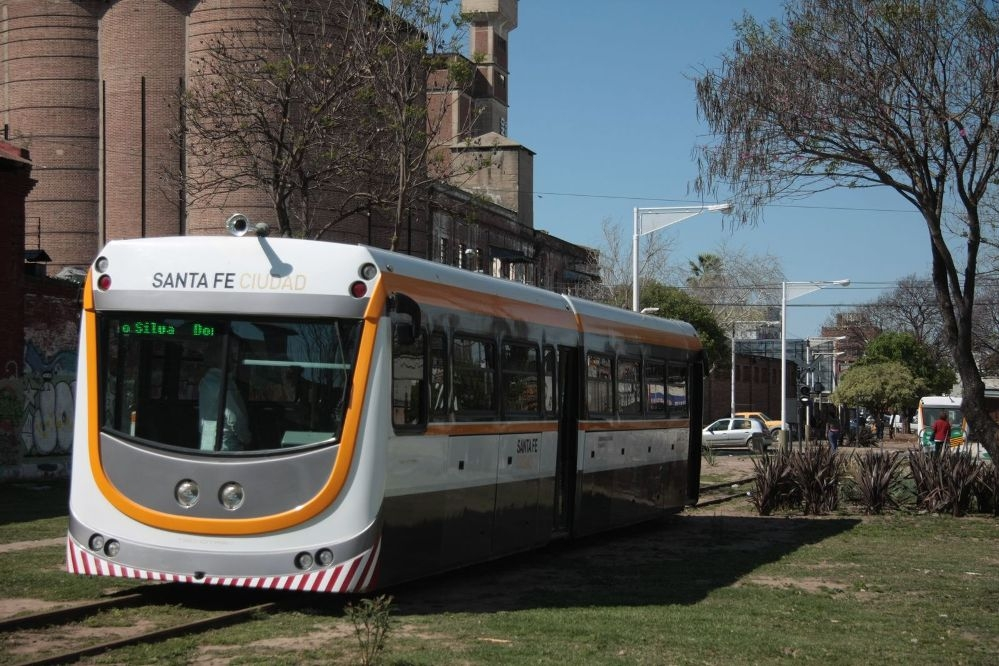
- TecnoTren railbus that served the line

Overview
- Service type: Commuter rail
- Status: Inactive
- Locale: Santa Fe
- First service: January 12, 2016
- Last service: 2019; 6 years ago
- Former operator: Municipality of Santa Fe

Route
- Termini: El Molino; Don Bosco
- Stops: 6
- Distance travelled: 3.7 km (2.3 mi)
- Average journey time: 15 minutes
- Service frequency: 30 minutes
- Line used: Belgrano

Technical
- Track gauge: 1,000 mm (3 ft 3 3/8 in)
- Operating speed: 40 km/h (25 mph)
- Track owner: Government of Argentina

The Santa Fe Urban Train (in Spanish: "Tren Urbano de Santa Fe") was a 3.7 km (2.3 mi) commuter rail serving the metropolitan area of Santa Fe city in Argentina. It had 8 stops, extending from El Molino to Don Bosco stations, running on the Belgrano Railway Ramal F tracks at a speed of 40 km/h (25 mph).

The Tren Urbano complemented other forms of public transportation on the city such as buses and cycling. Rolling stock were railbuses by local manufacturer TecnoTren, also used in the University train of La Plata.

The Tren Urbano was not longer active since 2019. In March 2022, it was announced that the remaining rolling stock would be auctioned.

== History ==
The first project of an urban railway had been featured in 2010, with two routes suggested, the first connecting Guadalupe station with the port of Santa Fe and the second joining both stations, Belgrano and Mitre railways. The project also planned an estimated journey time of 30 minutes and a frequency of one service per hour. The train only would run during the day because tracks were used by freight services (currently operated by Trenes Argentinos Cargas y Logística) by night.

Due to the Government of Argentina did not approve the original project, the municipal government had to change it to a shorter path running on tracks not used by freight concessionaires. That was the main condition required by the Nation to allow passenger trains running in the city.

Therefore, the route was set from former Molino Franchino (a former flour mill, currently an exhibition centre named "El Molino Fábrica Cultural") in the corner of Pedro Vittori and Boulevard Gálvez, where a bus stop already existed, remodeling it to make connections with train and cycling transport. Initial costs of the works were estimated at A$ 8 million. Departing from Molino Franchino, the train will run to the north, crossing Parque Federal, Puente Negro and finishing in Esquina Encendida (with a new station named "Don Bosco"), on the corner of Zeballos and Zuviría streets.

Works also included the construction of the intermediate stops, segregated cycle facilities along the way, the installation of traffic lights in all the level crossings. and the reconditioning of the existing tracks. The total costs of the works increased to over A$25 million.

By July 2015, all the electronic warning devices had been installed in the 22 level crossings of the line.

The service was put into operation on January 11, 2016, but operation was suspended after only three days because of a motor failure. The suspension continued until July 2016, when operation resumed.

Following multiple problems in operations, the two only units of Tren Urbano were put out of service and moved near El Molino station, remaining stopped there for about two years until they suddenly disappeared from that location, without further explanation from the authorities. Some time later, a local journalist revealed that the units had been taken to a warehouse operated by freight train company Belgrano Cargas y Logística. The Municipality alleged that the Tren Urbano could not operate because of the increasing frequencies of Belgrano Cargas service. The Tren Urbano is currently inactive.

In March 2022, the major of Santa Fe announced that the Santa Fe Urban Train rolling stock would be auctioned. According to him, the decision was taken after some studies made to evaluate train's operating conditions, which stated that it was unable to run across the city.
