= El Colorado, Santiago del Estero =

Coordinates: 27°56′S 62°10′W

El Colorado (Santiago del Estero)
- Municipality and village
- Interactive map of El Colorado (Santiago del Estero)
- Country: Argentina
- Province: Santiago del Estero
- Time zone: UTC−3 (ART)

El Colorado (Santiago del Estero) is a municipality and village in Santiago del Estero in Argentina.
