= Tren al Desarrollo =

Elevated commuter rail service in Argentina

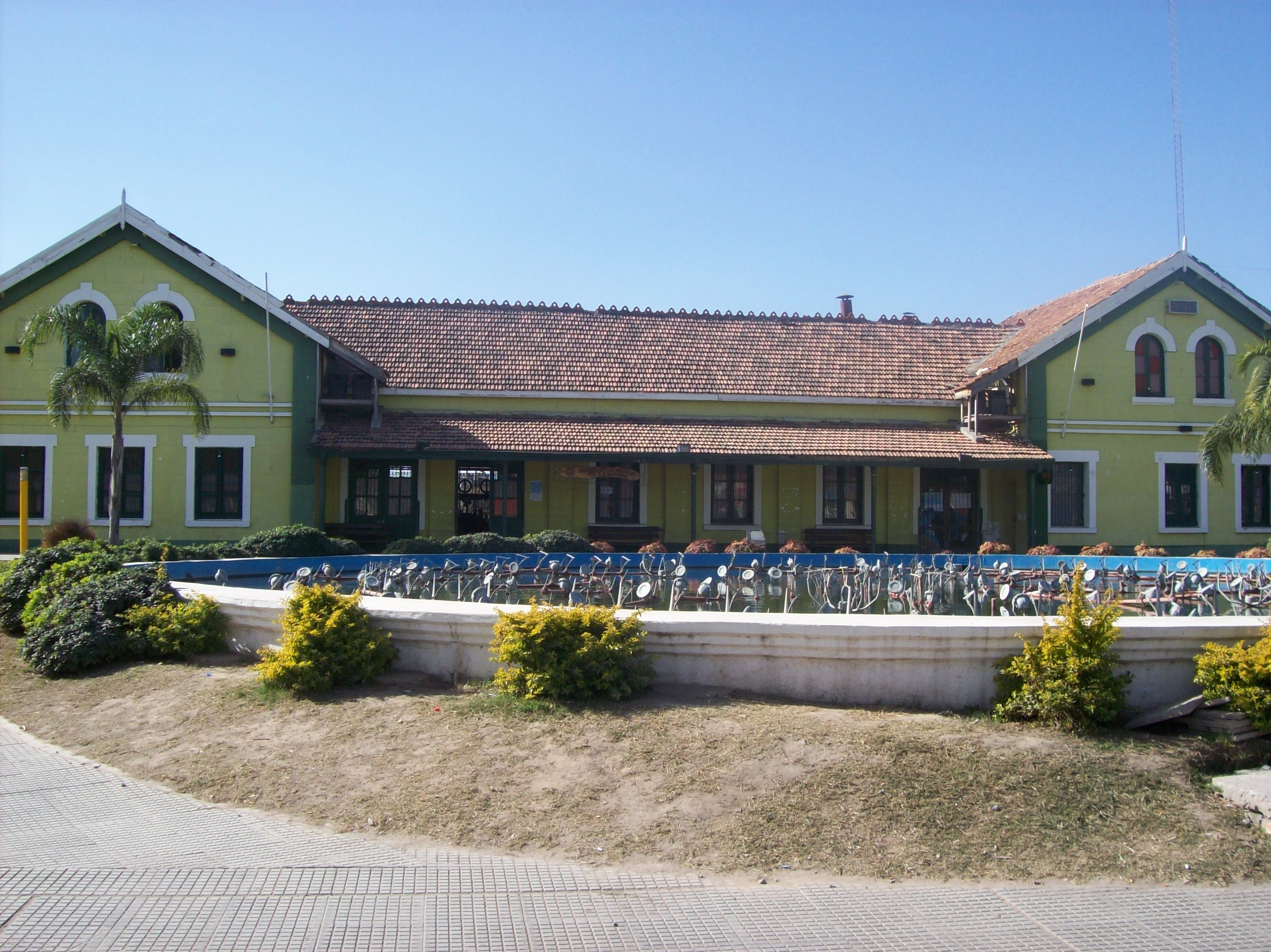
- La Banda Trenos Argentinos station, near the terminus of the line.

Overview
- Service type: Commuter rail
- Status: Active
- Locale: Santiago del Estero
- First service: September 19, 2016; 9 years ago
- Current operator: Government of Santiago del Estero
- Former operator: Ferrocarriles Argentinos

Route
- Termini: Santiago del Estero; La Banda
- Stops: 4
- Distance travelled: 8 km (5.0 mi)
- Average journey time: 25 min
- Service frequency: 30 min

On-board services
- Class: Unique
- Seating arrangements: Yes

Technical
- Track gauge: 1,000 mm (3 ft 3 3/8 in)
- Track owner: Government of Argentina

Tren al Desarrollo (in English: "Train to Development") is an elevated commuter rail service between the cities of Santiago del Estero (from the "Forum" station) and La Banda (with also a new building) in Santiago del Estero Province. Trains run on a 1,000 mm (3 ft 3 3/8 in) metre gauge track on a viaduct generally following the former Mitre Railway alignment. The line also crosses the Puente Negro, a bridge that had been closed for over 40 years.

In the beginning, the project only planned a 4 km-long (2.5 mi)-long line, then extended to 8 kilometres (5 mi). length to reach La Banda.

The rolling stock used is railbuses made by Argentine company TecnoTren. Each unit has a capacity of 100 passengers (70 seated). The journey time is about 25 minutes. Santiago Centro terminus station was inaugurated in May 2015.

The route has a total of four stations, with three of them having been specially built for the occasion, Forum (terminus), Botánico (with access to the botanical garden and Estadio Único Madre de Ciudades), and Nodo Tecnológico (in the industrial park of the city). The path finishes in La Banda, which was refurbished for that purpose. The entire route from Forum to Banda is on a 5.10-metre-high (16 ft 9 in) viaduct to avoid interfering with road traffic.

In September 2016, the first section between Santiago and Nodo Tecnológico was opened. The next section of La Banda was opened in March 2017.

There were also plans to reach Termas de Río Hondo, one of the main attractions of the Province, and another extension to San Miguel de Tucumán, although it has not been carried out.
