= TecnoTren =

Argentine manufacturer of railbuses

TecnoTren S.A.

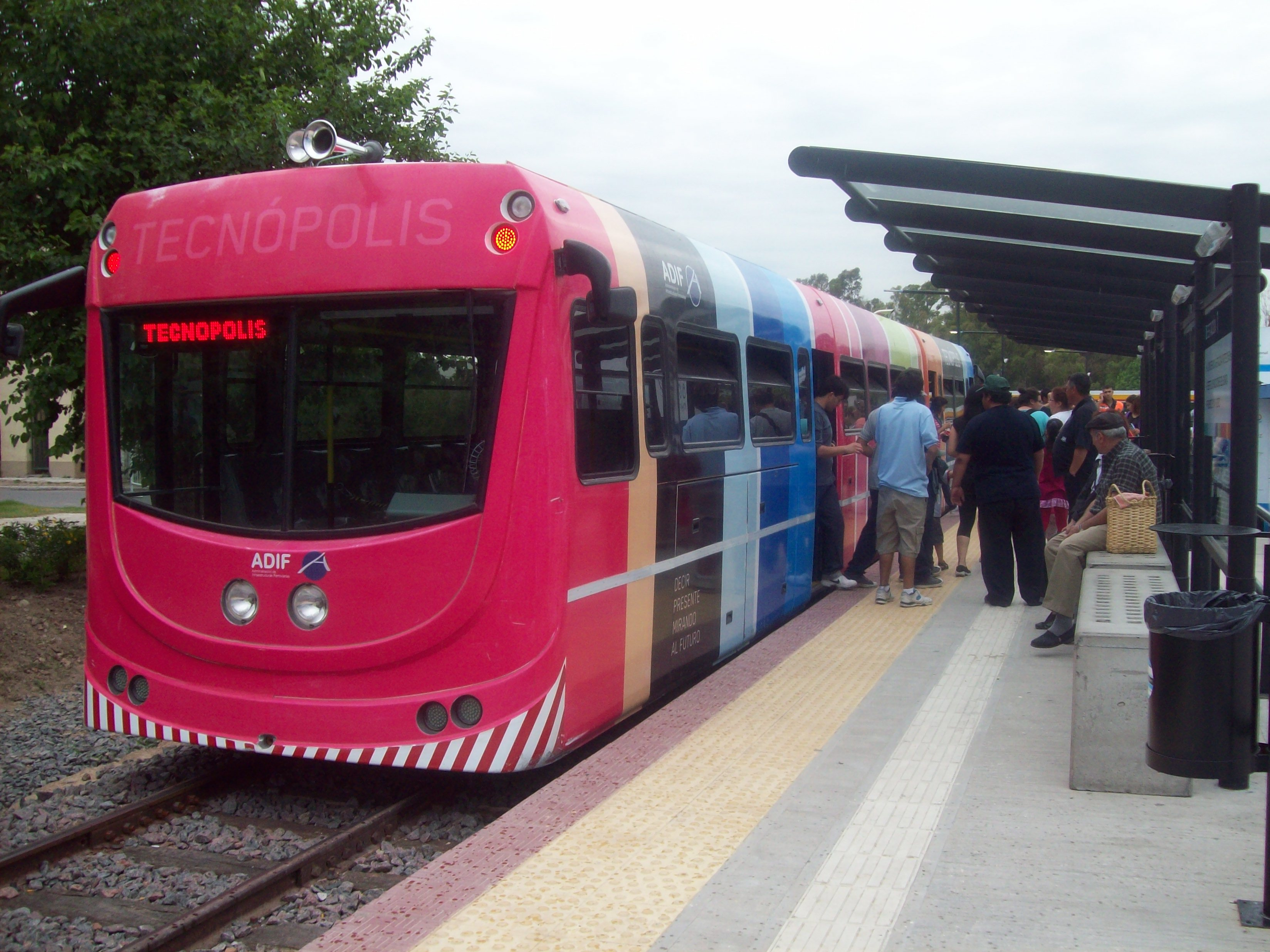
- TecnoTren railbus seen in Tecnopolis
- Company type: S.A.
- Industry: Transport
- Founded: 2009; 17 years ago
- Founder: Jorge Beritich
- Headquarters: El Talar, Tigre, Buenos Aires Province, Argentina
- Products: Railbuses

TecnoTren is an Argentine manufacturer of railbuses. Its products are designed to be very low-cost vehicles intended for use in rural parts of the country where railway privatisation and the subsequent deterioration of the network left small rural villages isolated.

== Overview ==
The TecnoTren units use readily available parts from the Argentine automotive industry, with the 1.7 litre engine being from a Fiat Duna, which doesn't necessarily have to be new. This makes them extremely economical both in price per unit and with regards to its fuel consumption, as well as maintenance costs. As a result, the railbuses are ideal for low-traffic rural lines while being easily adapted to the country's three primary track gauges.

The light weight of the units, as well as their low maximum speed, also mean that they can be used on tracks in very poor condition, making them well suited to parts of the country which have no current plans for track replacement under the recent modernisation efforts following renationalisation.

The TecnoTren is available in 1, 2, and 3 carriage configurations, all of which have disc brakes, automatic gearboxes, and a maximum range of 700 km. All components of the railbus are disc brakes made in Argentina, with the exception of the engine, which is no longer in production.

== History ==
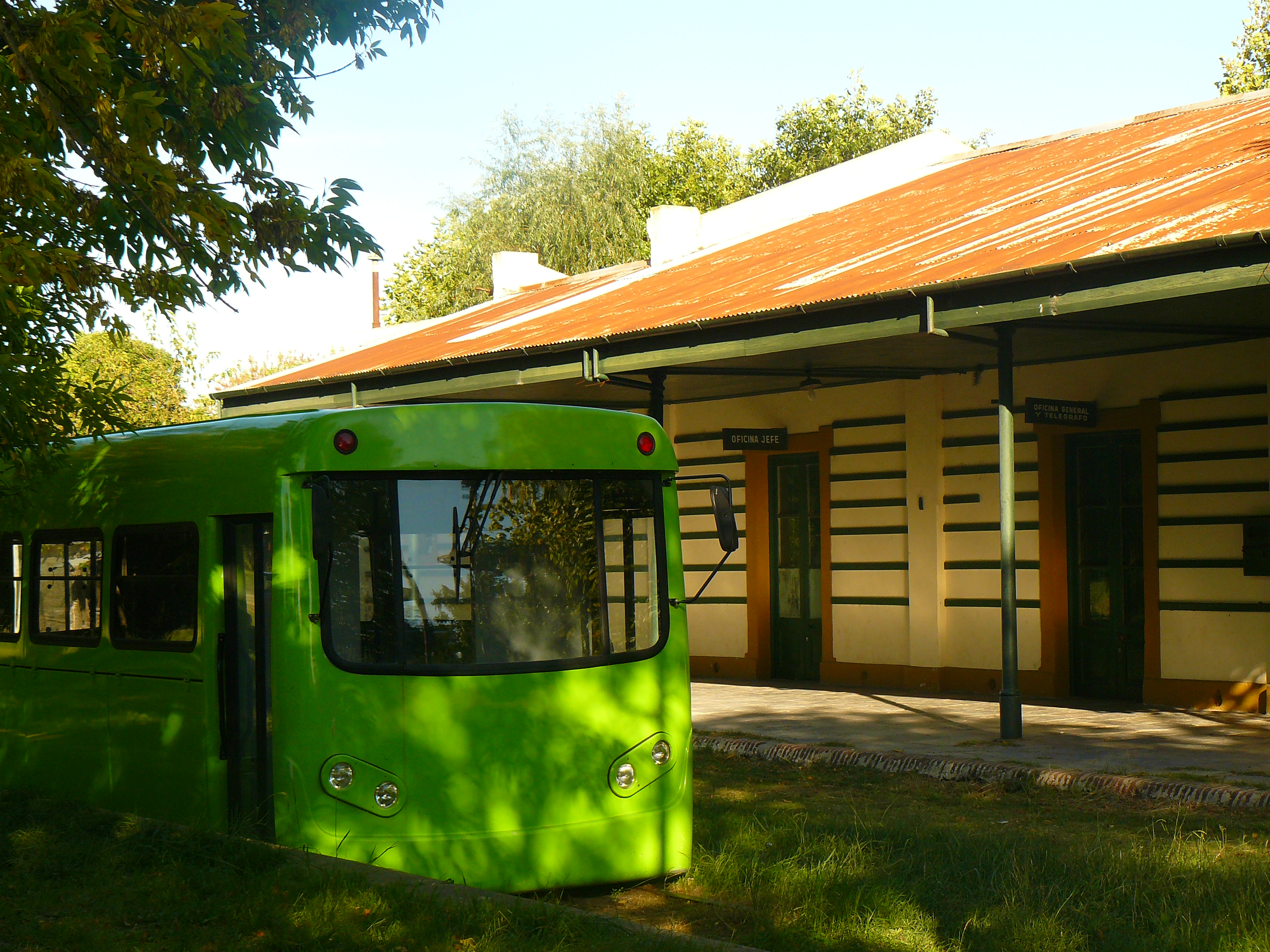
Original first prototype (named "microtren") at Bavio station of Roca Railway.

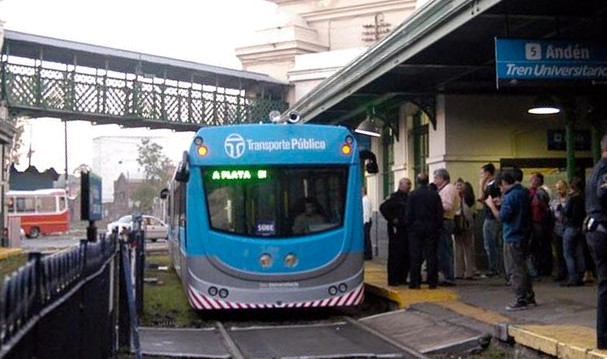
TecnoTren unit on the University train of La Plata

TecnoTren was established by Jorge Beritich, a former car body manufacturer that conceived and built a vehicle to run on abandoned railway tracks. Beritich designed a prototype named "Microtren" in 2003 but it could not be tested until 2007, when the microtren made short trips in General Mansilla (renamed "Bartolomé Bavio" by its inhabitants), one of the stations of the line that joined La Plata with Las Pipinas in the south-east of Buenos Aires Province. The line had been closed in 1978.

Although Beritich died soon after the prototype was launched, the production of railbuses was continued by Tecnoporte, a factory in the El Talar district of Greater Buenos Aires. The prototype was later modified and improved, resulting in the current TecnoTren.

TecnoTren made its official debut in the Entre Ríos Province, running on the line from Paraná to Colonia Avellaneda since 2010 and being operated by the Unidad Ejecutora Ferroviaria de Entre Ríos (UEFER), a state-owned company of the province. The journey time was 40 minutes with 25 stops along the way. In 2013, those services were transferred to the national company Trenes Argentinos, which runs the trains to the present day.

In 2013, the TecnoTren railbuses inaugurated the 4,6 km-long University train of La Plata service running on Roca Railway tracks along the university campus, joining the La Plata terminus with the polyclinic. They are also used in some specialist cases, such as for transport at the Tecnopolis exposition ground.

Tecnotren units were chosen to run the "Tren al Desarrollo" on Mitre Railway tracks in Santiago del Estero Province. The service (meant for tourists and inaugurated in 2016) crosses the Puente Negro through Río Dulce.

== See also ==
- Santa Fe Urban Train
- Tren al Desarrollo
- University train of La Plata
- Rail transport in Argentina
