= Nueva Francia, Santiago del Estero =

Coordinates: 28°11′S 64°12′W

Nueva Francia (Santiago del Estero)
- Municipality and village
- Interactive map of Nueva Francia (Santiago del Estero)
- Country: Argentina
- Province: Santiago del Estero
- Time zone: UTC−3 (ART)

Nueva Francia (Santiago del Estero) is a municipality and village in Santiago del Estero in Argentina.
