= Estación Simbolar =

Coordinates: 27°42′S 64°18′W

- Municipality and village
- Interactive map of Estación Simbolar
- Country: Argentina
- Province: Santiago del Estero
- Time zone: UTC−3 (ART)

Estación Simbolar es una localidad de la Nación Argentina, en el Departamento Banda, provincia de Santiago del Estero. Situada a la vera de la ruta Provincial N° 11, a 10 km de la Ciudad de la Banda. Su fecha de Fundación es el 4 de octubre de 1905. La localidad cuenta con 2929 habitantes según el censo INDEC de 2022. Está representada por el Estado mediante una Comisión Municipal cuyo Representante actual es el Señor: Alderete, Omar Edvino. ]. https://censo.gob.ar/wp-content/uploads/2024/07/c2022_santiago_gobierno_local_c1.xlsx
