= El Mojón, Santiago del Estero =

Coordinates: 26°05′S 64°18′W

El Mojón (Santiago del Estero)
- Municipality and village
- Interactive map of El Mojón (Santiago del Estero)
- Country: Argentina
- Province: Santiago del Estero
- Time zone: UTC−3 (ART)

El Mojón (Santiago del Estero) is a municipality and village in Santiago del Estero in Argentina.

In 2010, it had a population of 1600.
