= Chauchillas =

Coordinates: 27°31′08″S 64°33′30″W

- Municipality and village
- Interactive map of Chauchillas
- Country: Argentina
- Province: Santiago del Estero
- Time zone: UTC−3 (ART)

Chauchillas is a municipality and village in Santiago del Estero in Argentina.
