= Taquetúyoj =

Coordinates: 28°35′46″S 64°06′24″W

- Municipality and village
- Interactive map of Taquetúyoj
- Country: Argentina
- Province: Santiago del Estero
- Time zone: UTC−3 (ART)

Taquetúyoj is a municipality and village in Santiago del Estero in Argentina.
