= Estación Taboada =

Coordinates: 28°01′S 63°45′W

- Municipality and village
- Interactive map of Estación Taboada
- Country: Argentina
- Province: Santiago del Estero
- Time zone: UTC−3 (ART)

Estación Taboada is a municipality and village in Santiago del Estero in Argentina.
