= El Zanjón =

Coordinates: 27°47′S 64°16′W

- Municipality and village
- Interactive map of El Zanjón
- Country: Argentina
- Province: Santiago del Estero
- Time zone: UTC−3 (ART)

El Zanjón is a municipality and village in Santiago del Estero in Argentina.
