= Santiago del Estero =

- City
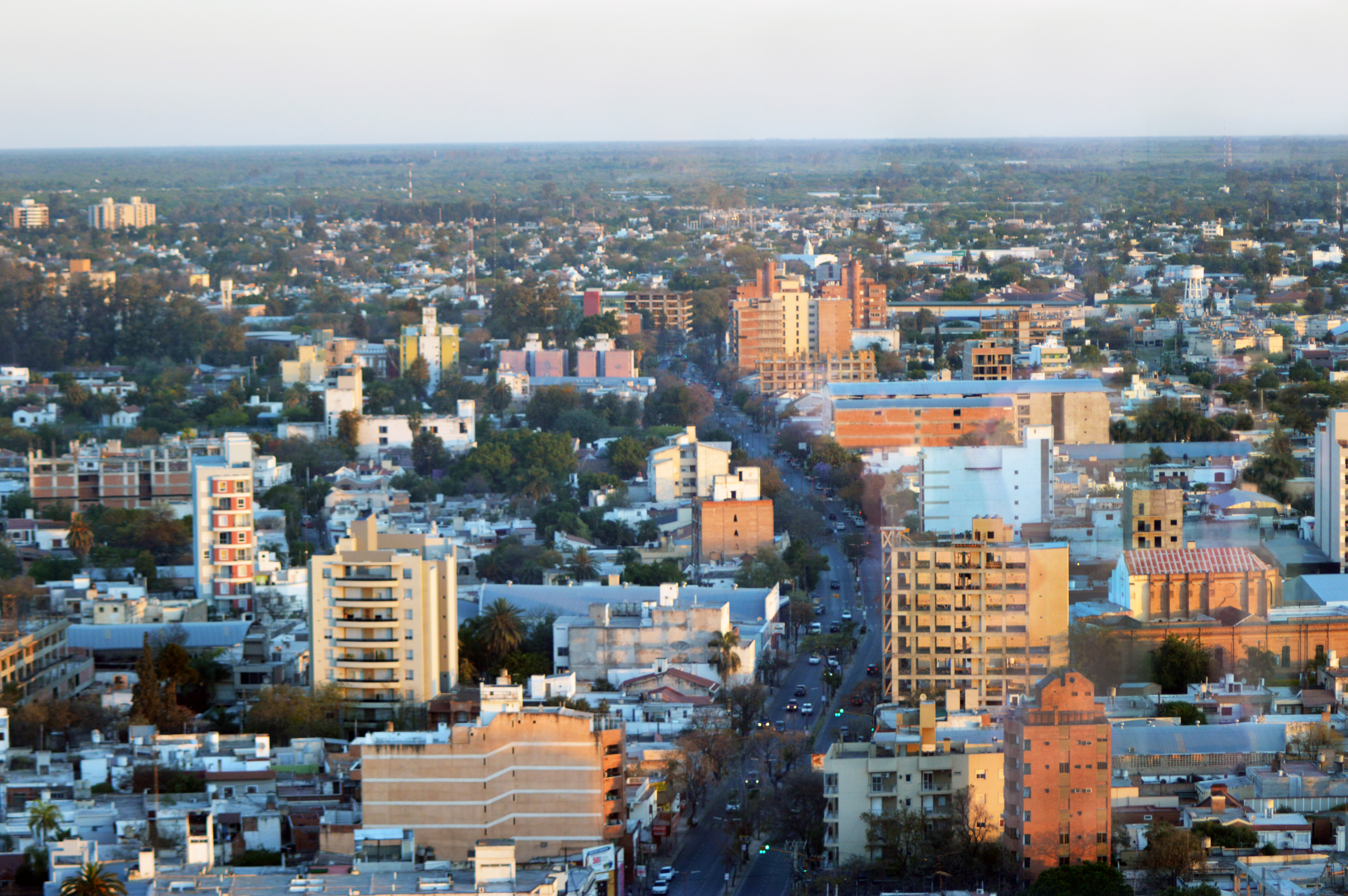
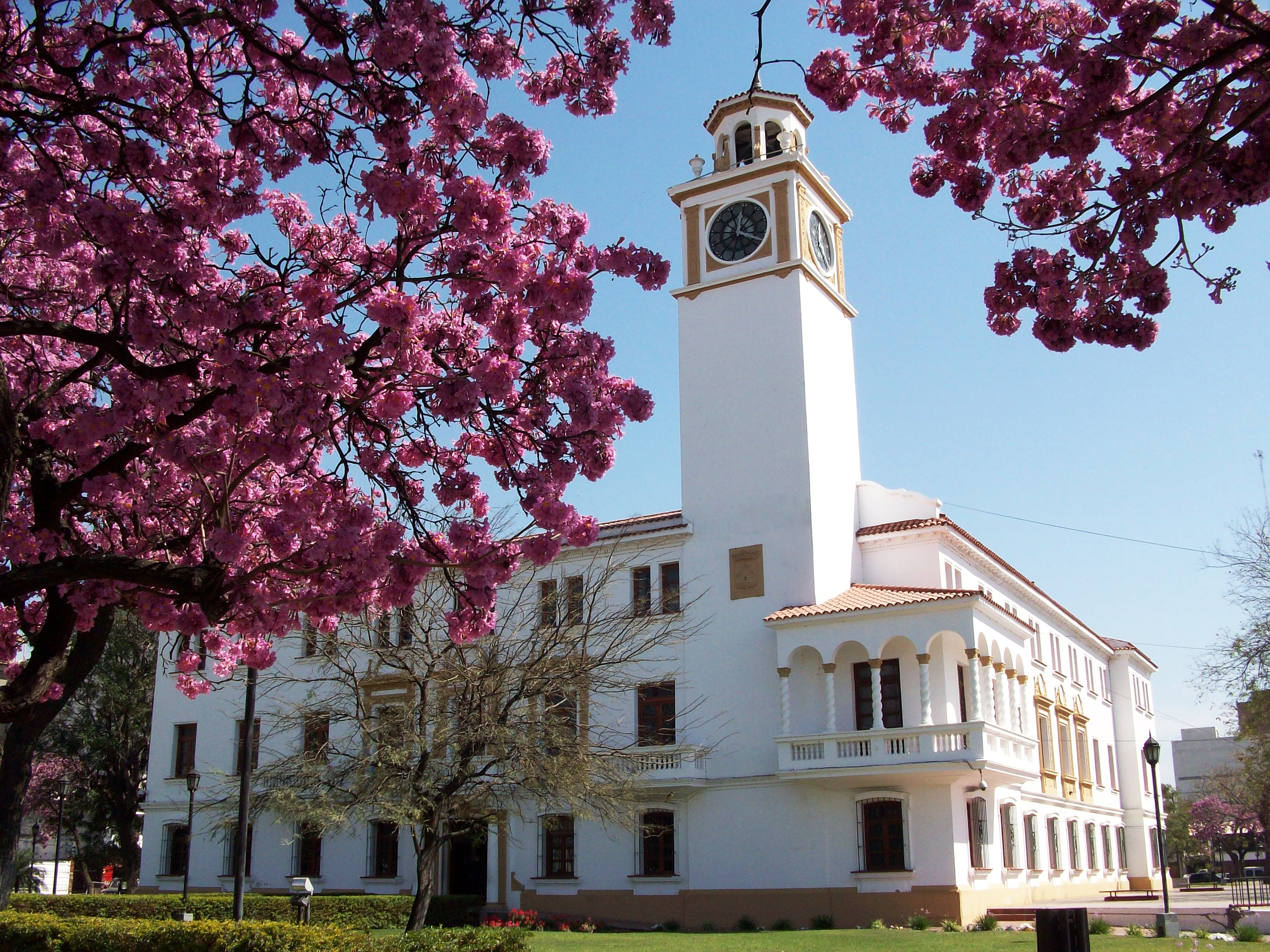
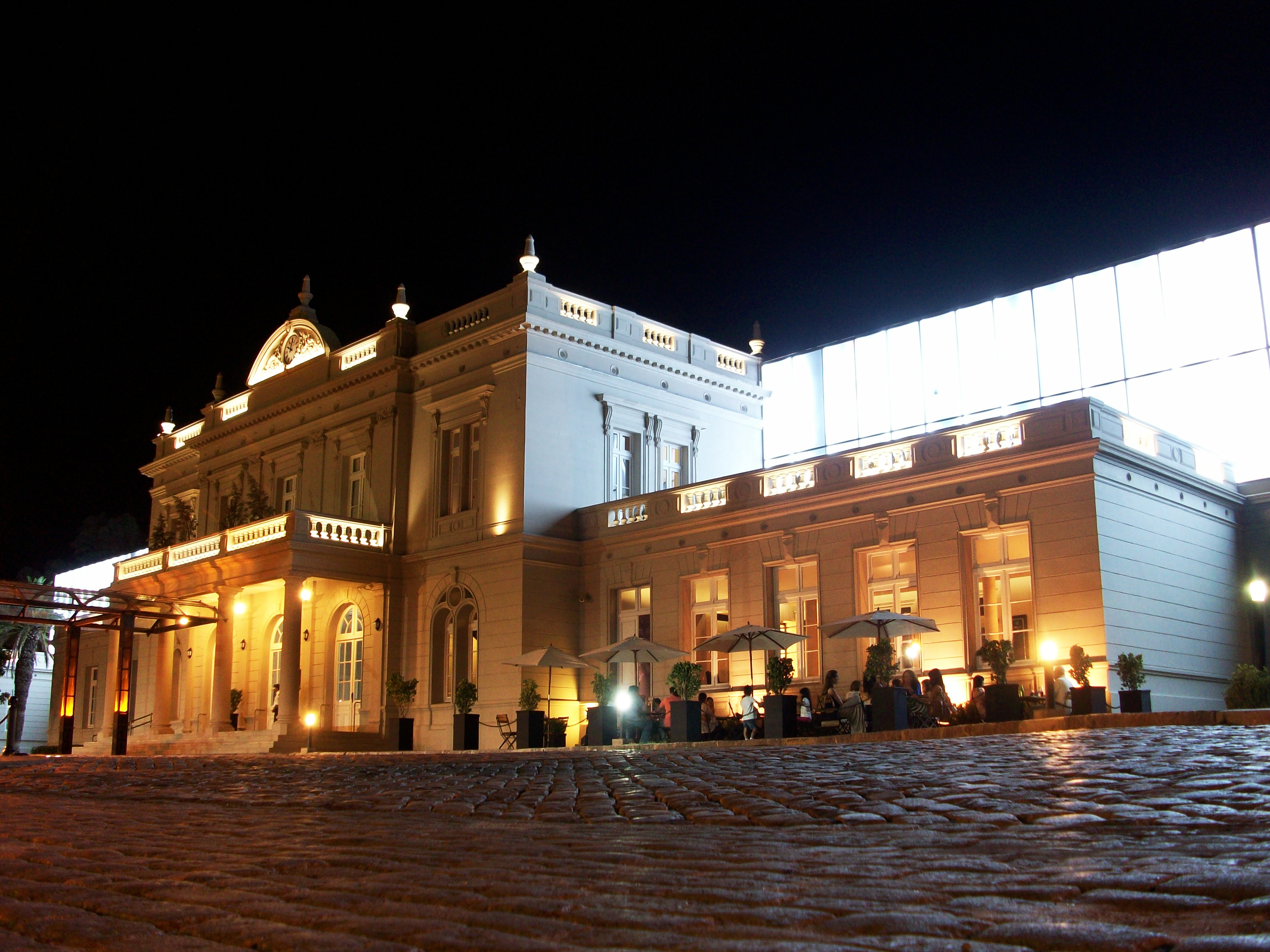
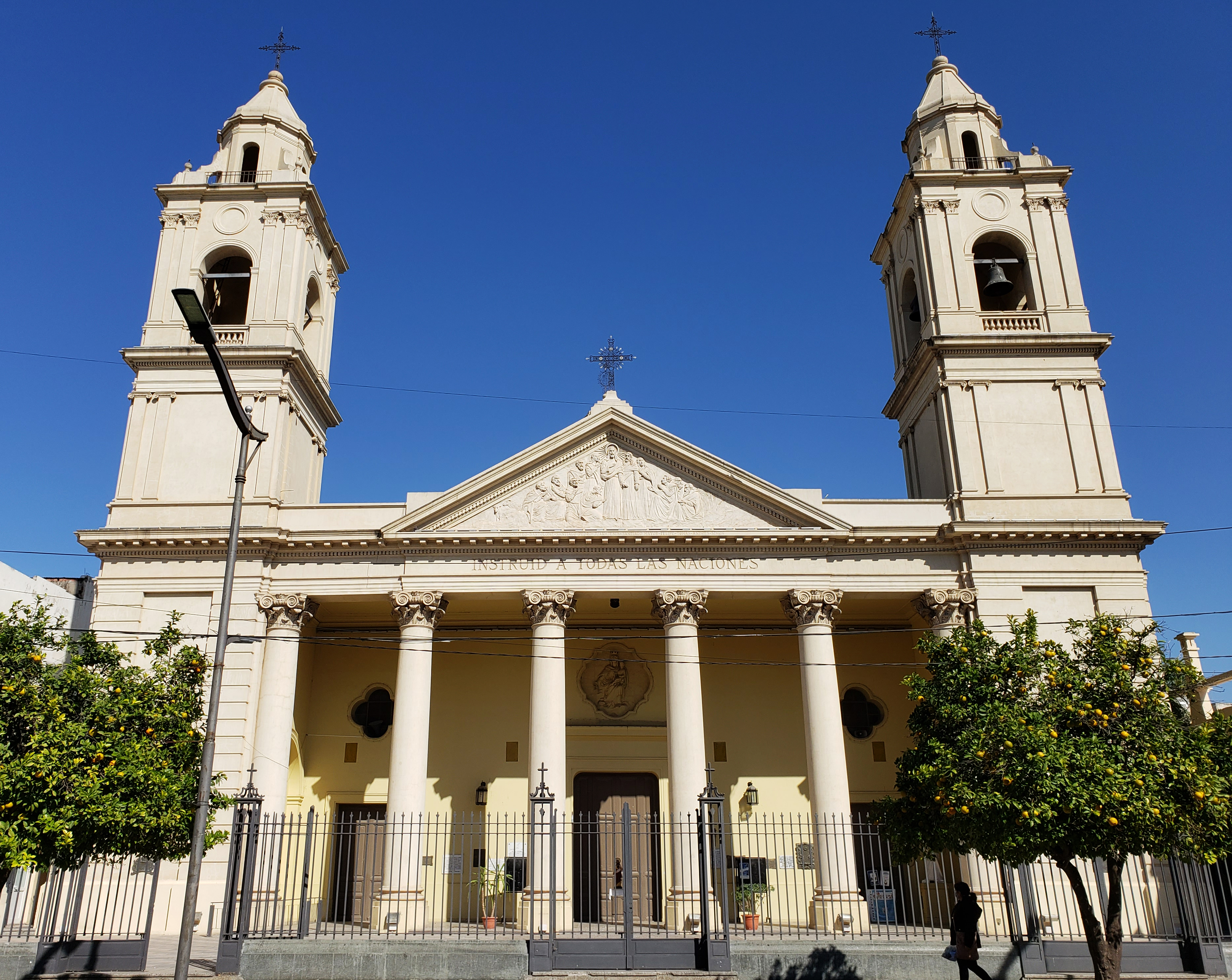
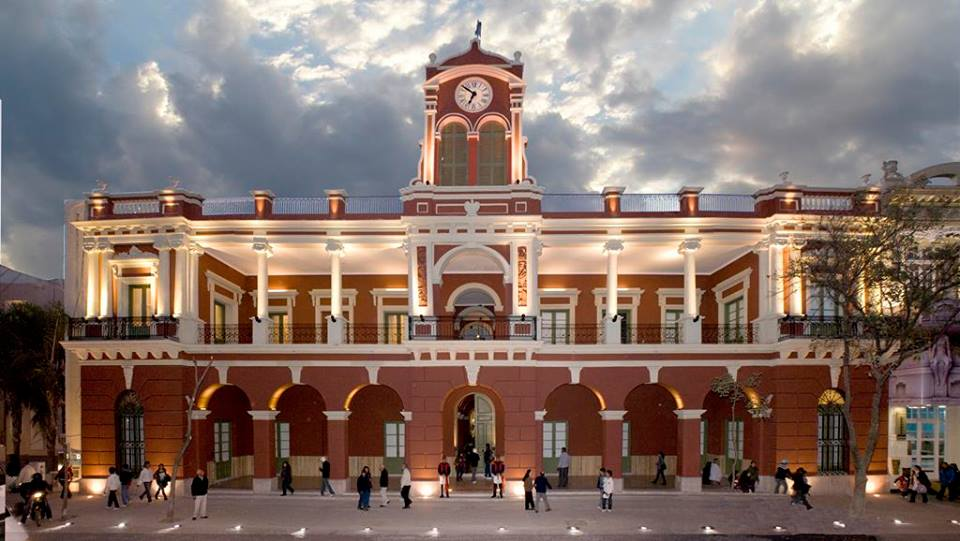
- Skyline of Santiago del Estero Government House of Santiago del Estero Santiago del Estero Forum Santiago del Estero Cathedral Bicentennial Cultural Center

- Flag Coat of arms
- Nickname: Mother of Cities
- Location of Santiago del Estero in Argentina Santiago del Estero (Santiago del Estero Province)
- Coordinates: 27°47′S 64°16′W
- Country: Argentina
- Province: Santiago del Estero
- Department: Capital

Government
  - Intendant: Norma Isabel Fuentes (Frente Cívico)

Area
  - City: 2,116 km^{2} (817 sq mi)
- Elevation: 182 m (597 ft)

Population (2022 census)
  - Urban: 311,506
- Demonym: santiagueño
- Time zone: UTC−3 (ART)
- CPA base: G4200
- Dialing code: +54 385

Santiago del Estero (Spanish pronunciation: [sanˈtjaɣo ðel esˈteɾo], Spanish for Saint-James-Upon-The-Lagoon) is the capital of Santiago del Estero Province in northern Argentina. It has a population of 252,192 inhabitants, (2010 census [INDEC]) making it the twelfth largest city in the country, with a surface area of 2,116 km^{2}. It lies on the Dulce River and on National Route 9, at a distance of 1,042 km north-northwest from Buenos Aires. Estimated to be 455 years old, Santiago del Estero was the first city founded by Spanish settlers in the territory that is now Argentina. As such, it is nicknamed "Madre de Ciudades" (Mother of Cities). Similarly, it has been officially declared the "mother of cities and cradle of folklore."

The city houses the National University of Santiago del Estero, founded in 1973, and the Universidad Católica, founded in 1960. Other points of interest include the city's Cathedral, the Santo Domingo Convent, and the Provincial Archeology Museum.

The Santiago del Estero Airport is located 6 kilometres north of the city, and has regular flights to Buenos Aires and San Miguel de Tucumán.

The climate is subtropical with cool dry winters and wet humid summers. It receives an average annual precipitation of 600 mm, and the climate is warm.

Santiago del Estero and its surroundings are home to about 100,000 speakers of the local variety of Quechua, making it the southernmost outpost of the language of the Incas. It is one of the few indigenous languages surviving in modern Argentina.

== History ==
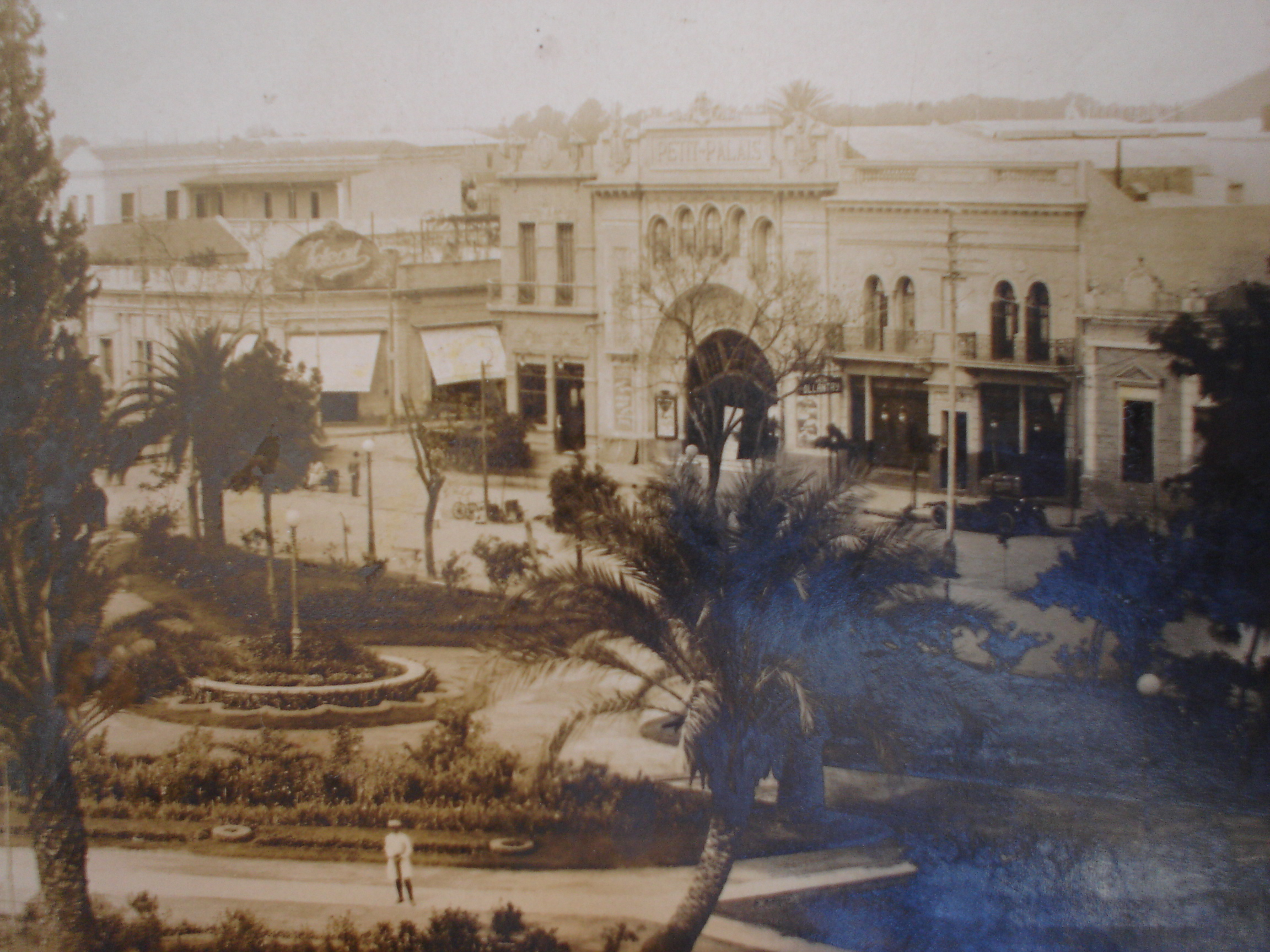
Petit Palais

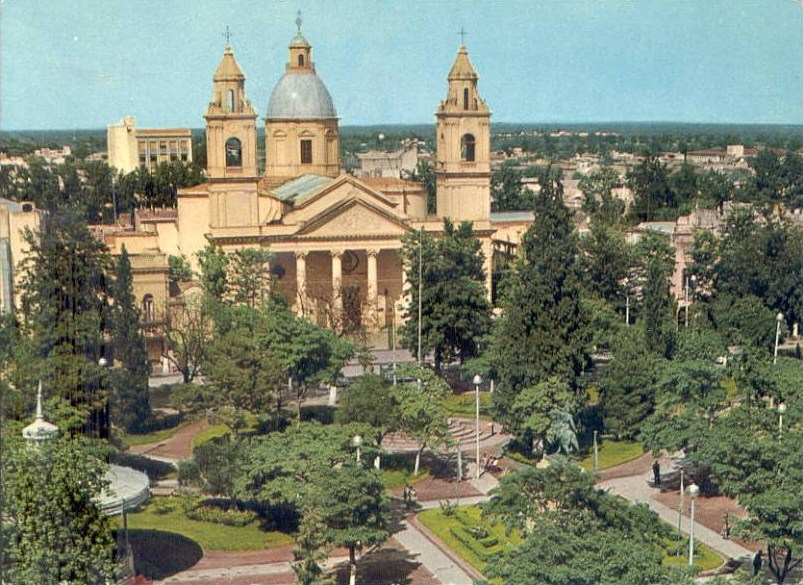
Santiago del Estero Cathedral c.1970

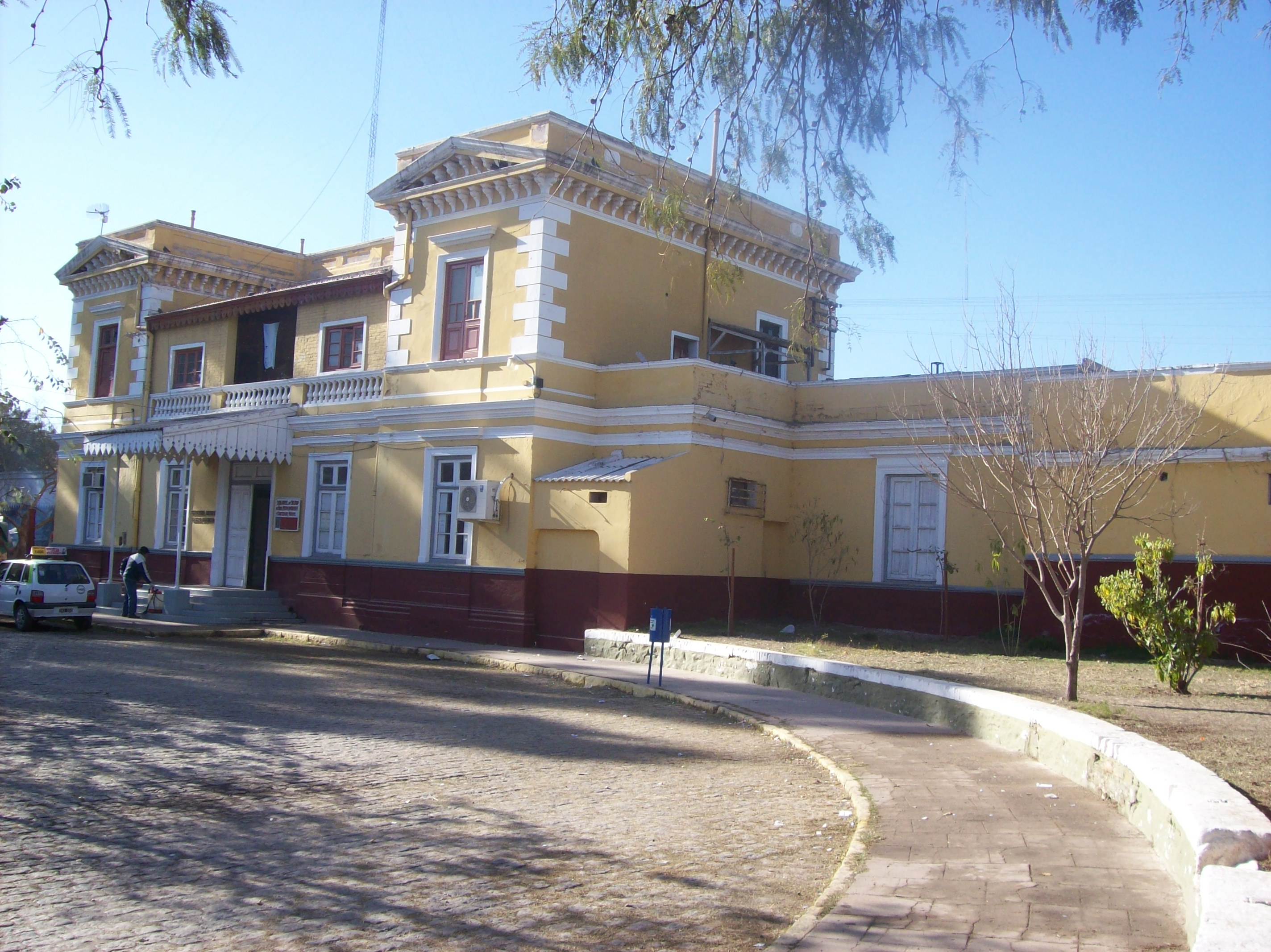
Front of the General Belgrano Railway train station.

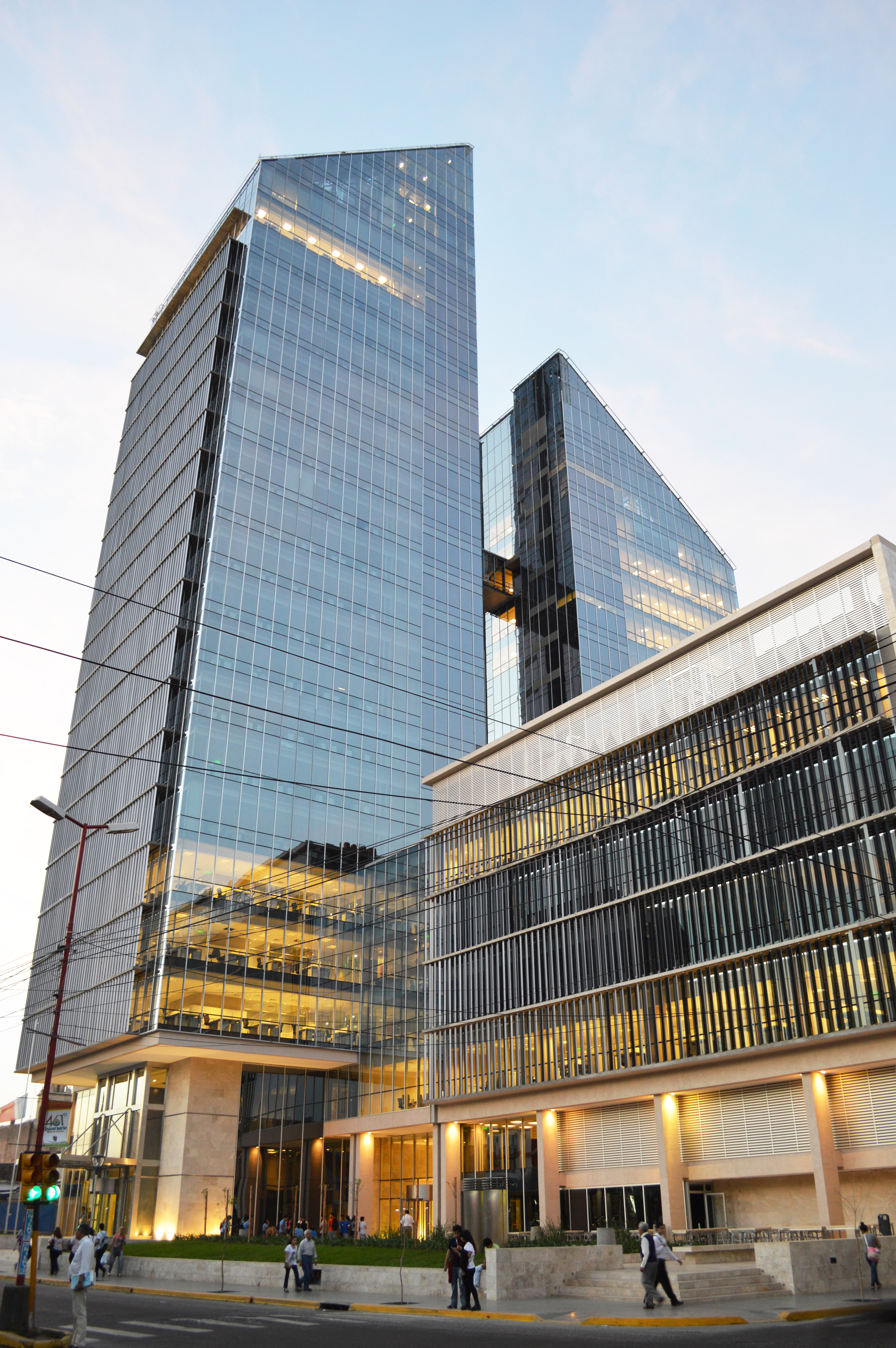
Complejo Juan Felipe Ibarra

After a series of exploratory expeditions from Chile starting in 1543, Santiago del Estero del Nuevo Maestrazgo was founded on July 25, 1553, by Francisco de Aguirre (although some historians consider its true foundation to be in 1550). Although it is the oldest city in Argentina, it preserves little of its former Spanish colonial architecture, except for several churches.

In 1576, the governor of a province in northern Argentina commissioned the military to search for a huge mass of iron, which he had heard that Natives used for their weapons. They called the area "Heavenly Fields," translated into Spanish as Campo del Cielo. (This term now refers to a protected area situated on the boundary between the provinces of Chaco and Santiago del Estero, where a group of iron meteorites were found, estimated as having fallen in a Holocene impact event some 4,000–5,000 years ago. In 2015, police arrested four alleged smugglers trying to steal more than a ton of protected meteorites.)

The city was the capital of the intendency of San Miguel de Tucumán during the Viceroyalty of the Río de la Plata, and first seat of its bishop; those were later moved to Salta and Córdoba respectively.

Santiago del Estero stands in the middle of an extensive but largely semi-arid agricultural region. Originally a dry forest area, the abundance of quebracho attracted timber industries of British capital during the 19th century, leading to extensive deforestation; the British-owned Central Argentine Railway reached the city in 1884.

In 1948, the province elected a young Peronist activist, Carlos Arturo Juárez, as its Governor. Santiago del Estero's central political figure during the second half of the 20th century, he soon became indispensable to local politics (even out of power).

The construction of the nearby Quiroga Dam (on the Río Dulce) in 1950, eased the city's chronic water shortage and spurred the growth of local agriculture, based on cotton and olives. The city's first school of higher education, the Instituto Superior del Profesorado (a normal school), was established in 1953. The city developed a sizable manufacturing sector based on textile mills and other light industry from the 1950s on, though the public sector remained the largest employer. Santiago del Estero's population reached 100,000 in 1970.

The province, however, remained one of the poorest in Argentina, falling further behind. In 1993, the city made international headlines when rioting erupted around the governor's mansion. What began as a protest by government workers who had not been paid in three months soon grew to 4,000 demonstrators who burned cars, destroyed government buildings and even invaded the homes of prominent politicians.

Juárez, by the 1990s, was readily ordering his opponents' deaths, notably that of former Governor César Iturre in 1996 and of Bishop Gerardo Sueldo in 1998. The 2002 deaths of two local women, however, were traced to Juárez's assassin, Antonio Musa Azar, and in an attempt to retain power, Juárez resigned (appointing his wife, Nina Juárez, governor).

The bid failed, however, as President Néstor Kirchner signed an executive order removing Mrs. Juárez from her post in March 2004. The Juárez couple, in their nineties, subsequently lived under house arrest in the city of Santiago del Estero; the former strongman died in 2010.

== Transport ==
=== Public ===
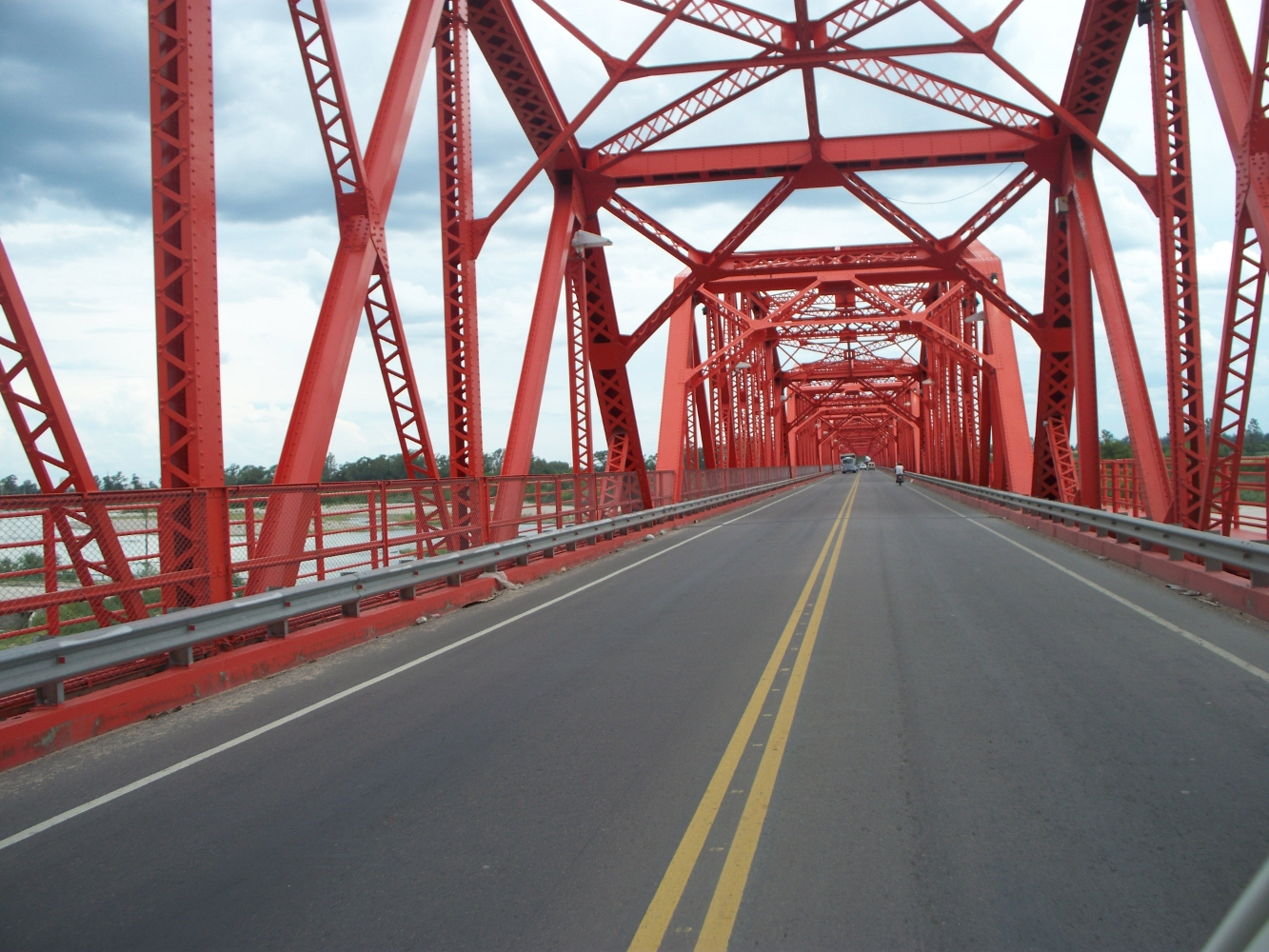
Road bridge between Santiago del Estero and La Banda

The Vicecomodoro Ángel de la Paz Aragonés Airport was built in 1959 and currently has flights to and from Buenos Aires operated by Aerolíneas Argentinas. In recent years it has been refurbished and expanded given that it was operating at full capacity.

The city's main road connection to other provinces is National Route 9, which connects it to the cities of Cordoba, Rosario and Buenos Aires to the south and San Miguel de Tucumán, Salta and San Salvador de Jujuy to the north. National Route 64 connects the city to San Fernando del Valle de Catamarca, the capital of Catamarca Province. In November 2008, a new long-distance bus terminal was inaugurated, replacing the previous bus terminal in the city.

=== Railway ===
The city has historically been connected through the Belgrano and Mitre railways. An elevated commuter rail line known as Tren al Desarrollo is under construction in the city, connecting Santiago del Estero to the city of La Banda.

Name	Former company	Line	Status (passenger)	Current rail operator/s
Santiago del Estero	Central Northern	Belgrano	Closed	Trenes Argentinos CyL
Santiago del Estero	Central Argentine	Mitre	Closed ^{1}	Tren al Desarrollo ^{1}

Notes: ^{1} Under construction, work in progress

== Climate ==
Monument to Manuel Belgrano

Santiago del Estero lies in a transition zone between more temperate climates, typical of the Pampa, and the hotter climates of the Chaco region: while daytime highs are decidedly very hot, nights tend to cool down more than most locations in the Chaco. It has a hot semi-arid climate (BSh) bordering on a humid subtropical climate (Cwa) under the Köppen climate classification.

The city is notorious for its very hot summer weather: the average high is 34 °C (93.2 °F) and 40 °C (104.0 °F) are attained on a regular basis; the highest temperature on record is 46.5 °C (115.7 °F) on November 1, 2009. Nighttime temperatures are 20 °C (68.0 °F) in midsummer. There is a very short, humid season between December and February, with up to 140 millimetres (6 in) monthly; however, this rain falls during a handful of very strong thunderstorms, and so the amount that falls on a given year is extremely variable.

Fall is still warm, with average highs of 27 °C (80.6 °F) in April, and lows of 14 °C (57.2 °F). Temperatures can still soar to 40 °C (104.0 °F) in this season. Rainfall is scarce, and becomes practically 0 for 5 months: in July, only 3.7 millimetres (0 in) are expected. Winters bring very pleasant days (20 °C (68.0 °F)) with markedly colder nights (under 6 °C (42.8 °F)). Nonetheless, these averages are obtained through an alternance of heat waves and cold waves: short periods of 28 to 35 °C (82.4 to 95.0 °F) are followed by frosty days with highs around 12 °C (53.6 °F), and sometimes the thermometer fails to reach 8 °C (46.4 °F). The thermometer does descend below −5 °C (23.0 °F), and the record low is −9.0 °C (15.8 °F) on July 18, 1975.

Late in the winter, heat waves become much more common, and in September, 40 °C (104.0 °F) are already possible. The pattern of intense heat waves followed by cool, windy weather is typical of spring, which is also very dry in Santiago. The high temperatures, extreme dryness and high winds create a very dusty environment. In October, the average high is already 31 °C (87.8 °F), and rainfall only arrives in late November. December is as hot as January, and the abundant rains make the landscape green for a few months. Total precipitation is low, 609 millimetres (24 in), and varies from one year to another.

Climate data for Santiago del Estero Airport (1991–2020, extremes 1873–present)
Month	Jan	Feb	Mar	Apr	May	Jun	Jul	Aug	Sep	Oct	Nov	Dec	Year
Record high °C (°F)	45.6 (114.1)	45.7 (114.3)	41.7 (107.1)	39.4 (102.9)	35.6 (96.1)	32.6 (90.7)	37.3 (99.1)	40.5 (104.9)	43.0 (109.4)	45.2 (113.4)	46.5 (115.7)	45.3 (113.5)	46.5 (115.7)
Mean daily maximum °C (°F)	34.2 (93.6)	32.7 (90.9)	30.5 (86.9)	26.7 (80.1)	23.1 (73.6)	20.4 (68.7)	20.9 (69.6)	24.8 (76.6)	27.6 (81.7)	30.6 (87.1)	32.5 (90.5)	34.1 (93.4)	28.2 (82.8)
Daily mean °C (°F)	27.0 (80.6)	25.8 (78.4)	23.8 (74.8)	20.1 (68.2)	16.2 (61.2)	12.9 (55.2)	12.1 (53.8)	15.4 (59.7)	19.1 (66.4)	22.8 (73.0)	25.0 (77.0)	26.7 (80.1)	20.6 (69.1)
Mean daily minimum °C (°F)	20.7 (69.3)	20.0 (68.0)	18.5 (65.3)	14.9 (58.8)	10.7 (51.3)	7.1 (44.8)	4.9 (40.8)	7.2 (45.0)	10.8 (51.4)	15.6 (60.1)	18.1 (64.6)	20.2 (68.4)	14.1 (57.4)
Record low °C (°F)	5.0 (41.0)	6.6 (43.9)	2.7 (36.9)	−1.4 (29.5)	−6.8 (19.8)	−6.9 (19.6)	−9.0 (15.8)	−7.1 (19.2)	−4.5 (23.9)	0.4 (32.7)	1.3 (34.3)	6.2 (43.2)	−9.0 (15.8)
Average precipitation mm (inches)	139.3 (5.48)	106.5 (4.19)	94.3 (3.71)	39.9 (1.57)	16.0 (0.63)	9.3 (0.37)	1.6 (0.06)	3.5 (0.14)	10.0 (0.39)	55.2 (2.17)	71.8 (2.83)	105.0 (4.13)	652.4 (25.69)
Average precipitation days (≥ 0.1 mm)	9.3	8.2	8.9	6.8	4.6	3.7	1.7	0.9	2.0	5.9	6.8	8.8	67.7
Average relative humidity (%)	65.2	68.9	72.8	75.3	74.9	72.7	62.9	52.2	49.2	54.7	57.3	61.3	64.0
Mean monthly sunshine hours	241.8	223.2	192.2	174.0	145.7	135.0	158.1	207.7	189.0	210.8	234.0	226.3	2,337.8
Percentage possible sunshine	57	60	51	51	43	43	48	60	53	53	57	53	52
Source 1: Servicio Meteorológico Nacional
Source 2: Meteo Climat (record highs and lows), UNLP (sun only 1971–1980)

== Culture ==
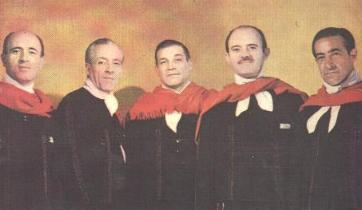
The Ábalos Brothers, whose folklore records have sold well across South America, since their 1952 debut.

Some important figures related to the history of Santiago del Estero are Colonel Juan Francisco Borges, who led the local battalion of the Army of the North during the Argentine War of Independence (and an ancestor of writer Jorge Luis Borges), the 19th-century painter Felipe Taboada, as well as Francisco René and Mario Roberto Santucho, founders of the Partido Revolucionario de los Trabajadores (Workers' Revolutionary Party, PRT) and the Ejército Revolucionario del Pueblo (People's Revolutionary Army, ERP), the two leading guerrilla organizations during the wave of unrest in the 1970s.

The city is home to numerous important Argentine artists, such as Ramon Gómez Cornet, Carlos Sánchez Gramajo, Alfredo Gogna, Ricardo and Rafael Touriño in visual arts, and Jorge Washington Ábalos, Bernardo Canal Feijóo, Clementina Rosa Quenel, Alberto Tasso, Carlos Virgilio Zurita and Julio Carreras (h) in literature.

Santiago's musical heritage is one of the most important cultural aspects of the city, with typical folklore chacarera and zamba. Some renowned artists and groups include the Manseros Santiagueños, the Ábalos Brothers (led by Adolfo and Alfredo Ábalos), Jacinto Piedra and Dúo Coplanacu.

== Sports ==
The city is home to the Asociación Atlética Quimsa, 2015 champion of Argentina's Liga Nacional de Básquet. The team plays its home games at the Estadio Ciudad de Santiago del Estero.

In 2021, the Estadio Único Madre de Ciudades was inaugurated in Santiago del Estero. The stadium is expected to host ten matches of the 2023 FIFA U-20 World Cup.

== Notable people ==
- Nicolás Aguirre (born 1988), basketball player
- Amancio Jacinto Alcorta (1805–1862), composer and politician
- Casimiro Alcorta (1840–1913), tango musician
- Patrocinio Díaz (1905-1969), singer and actress
- Ramón Carrillo (1906–1956), neurosurgeon and public health advocate, first health minister of Argentina
- Mariela Coronel (born 1981), footballer
- Agustina Palacio de Libarona (1825–1880), writer, storyteller; also known as "La Heroína del Bracho"
- Omar Sebastián Pérez (born 1981), footballer
- Alberto Soriano (1905–1981), composer
- Federico Villegas (born 1966), diplomat
- Sergio Unrein (born 1991), footballer

== Villages ==
- Beltrán
- Chauchillas
- El Arenal
- El Bobadal
- El Charco
- El Colorado
- El Mojón
- El Zanjón
- Estación Simbolar
- Estación Taboada
- Estación Tacañitas
- Gramilla
- Ingeniero Forres
- Lavalle
- Los Núñez
- Nueva Francia
- Taquetúyoj

== Gallery ==
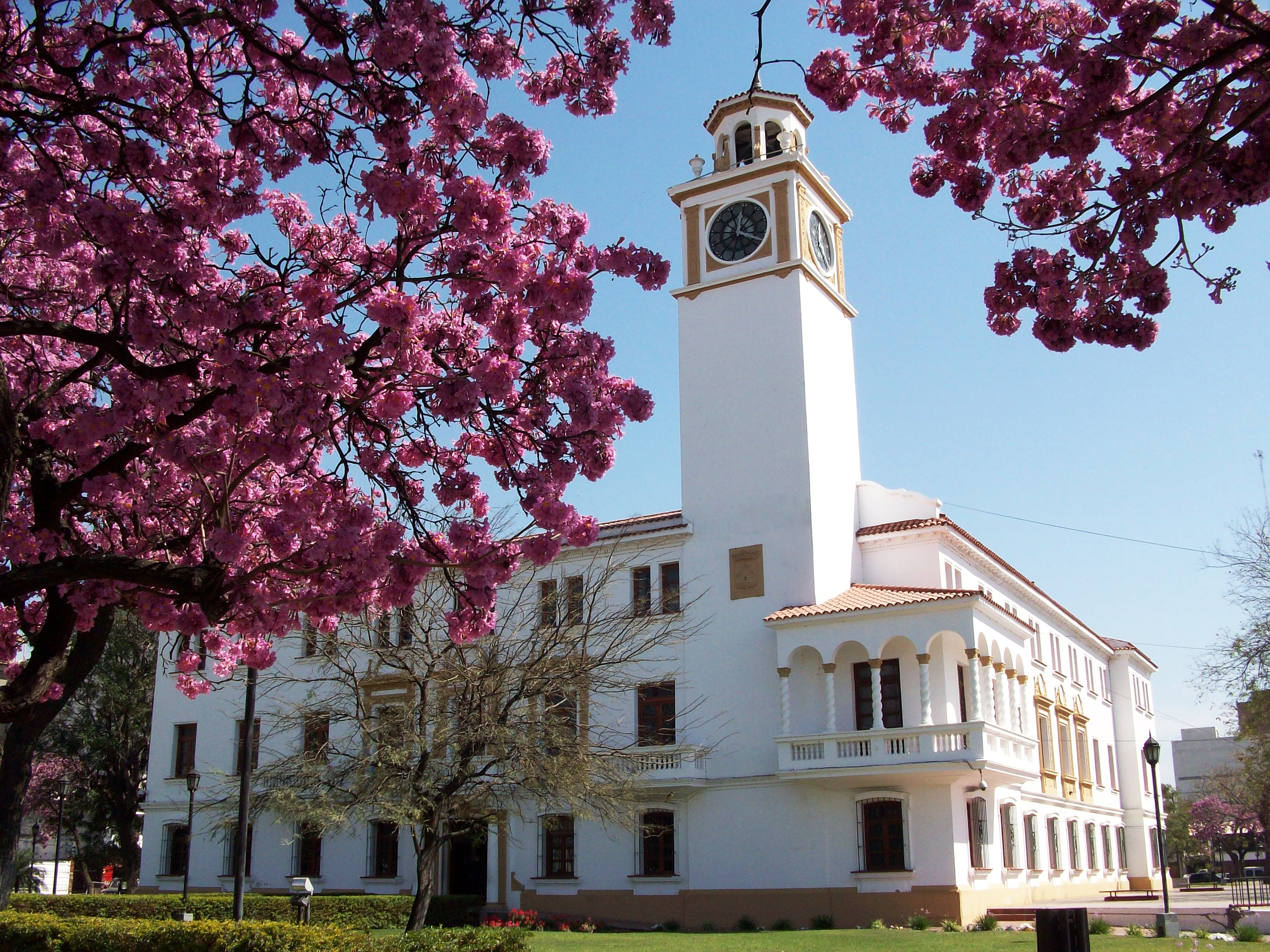
Government house

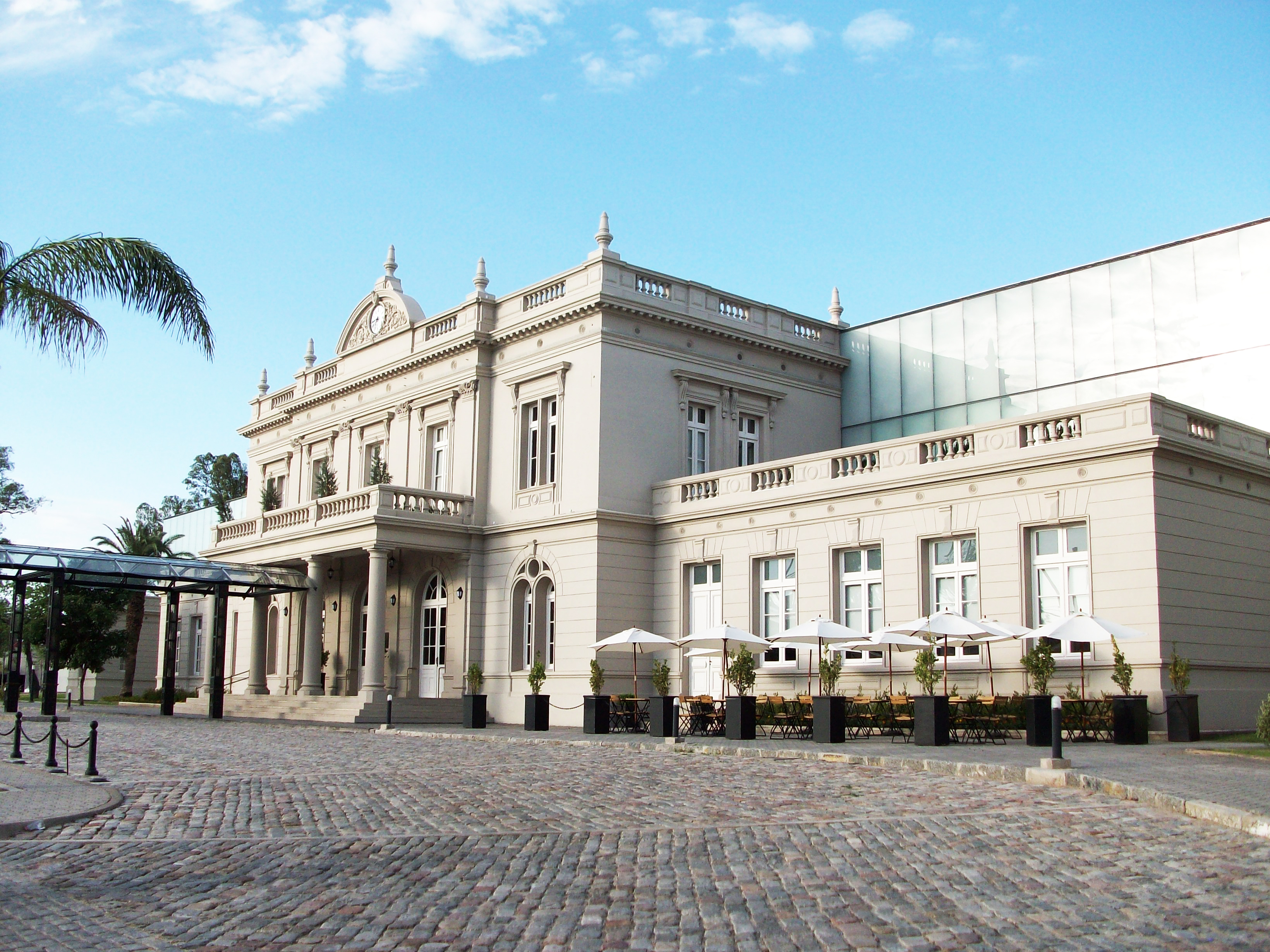
Santiago del Estero convention centre

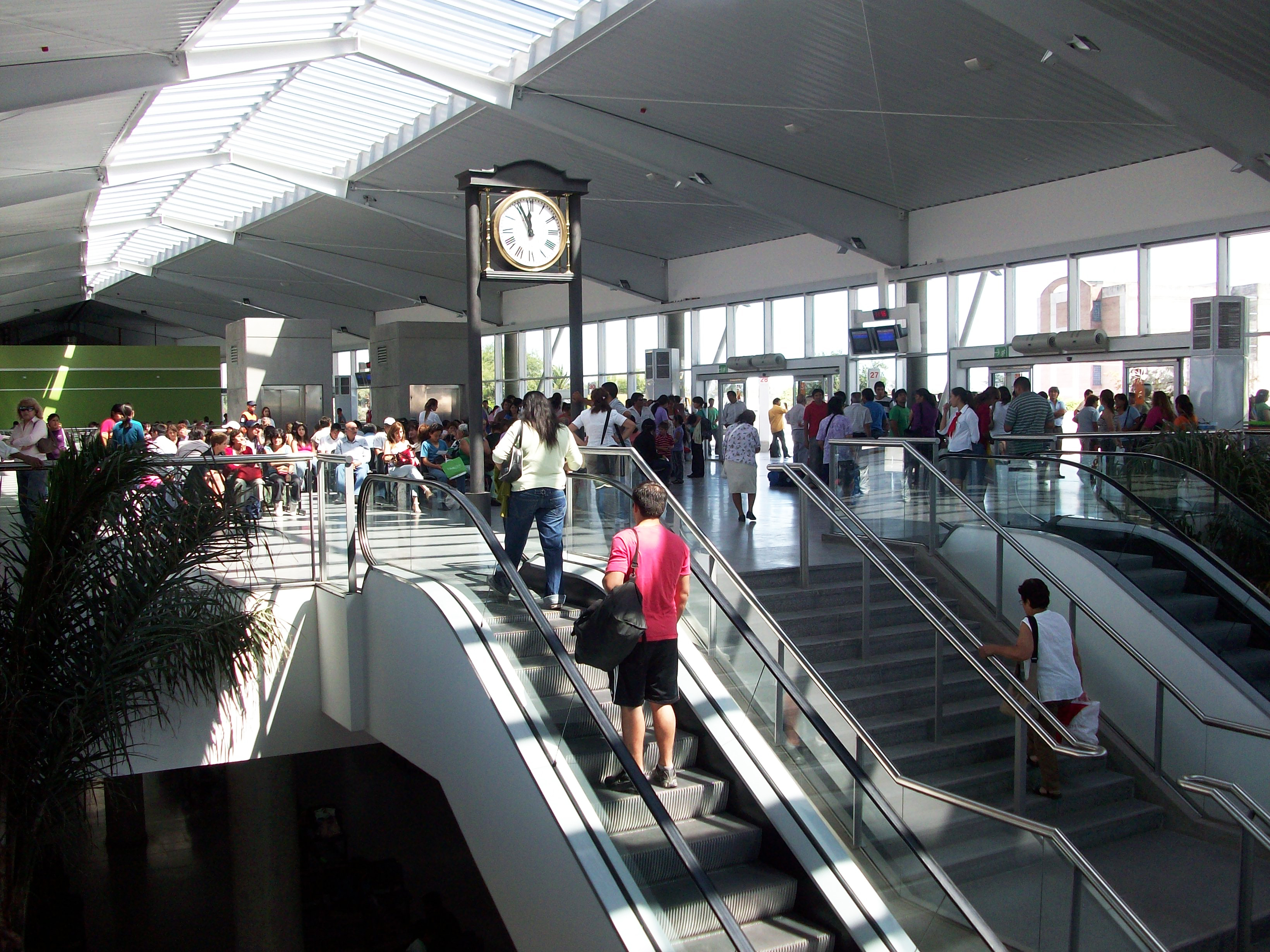
Central bus station

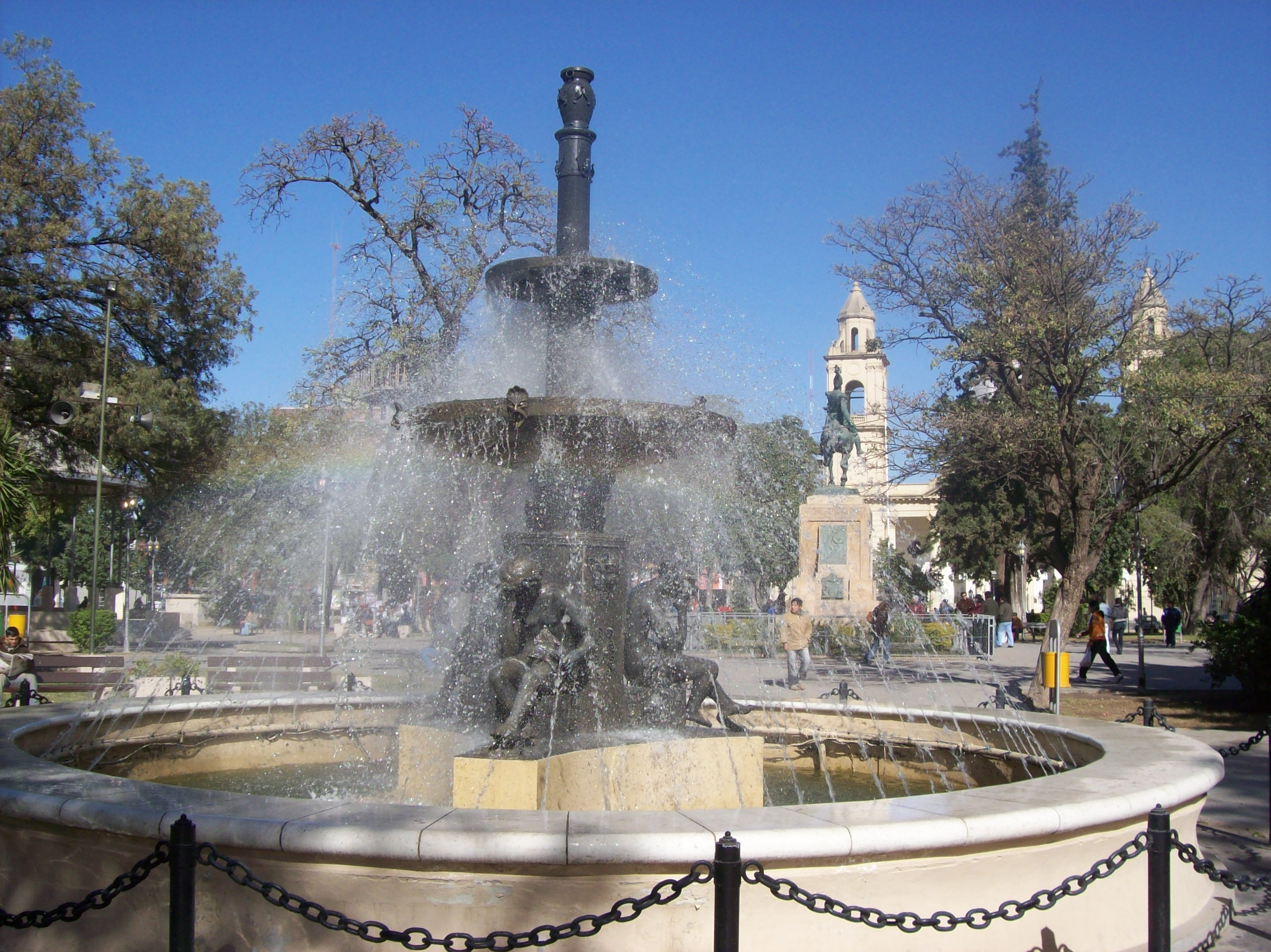
Plaza Libertad

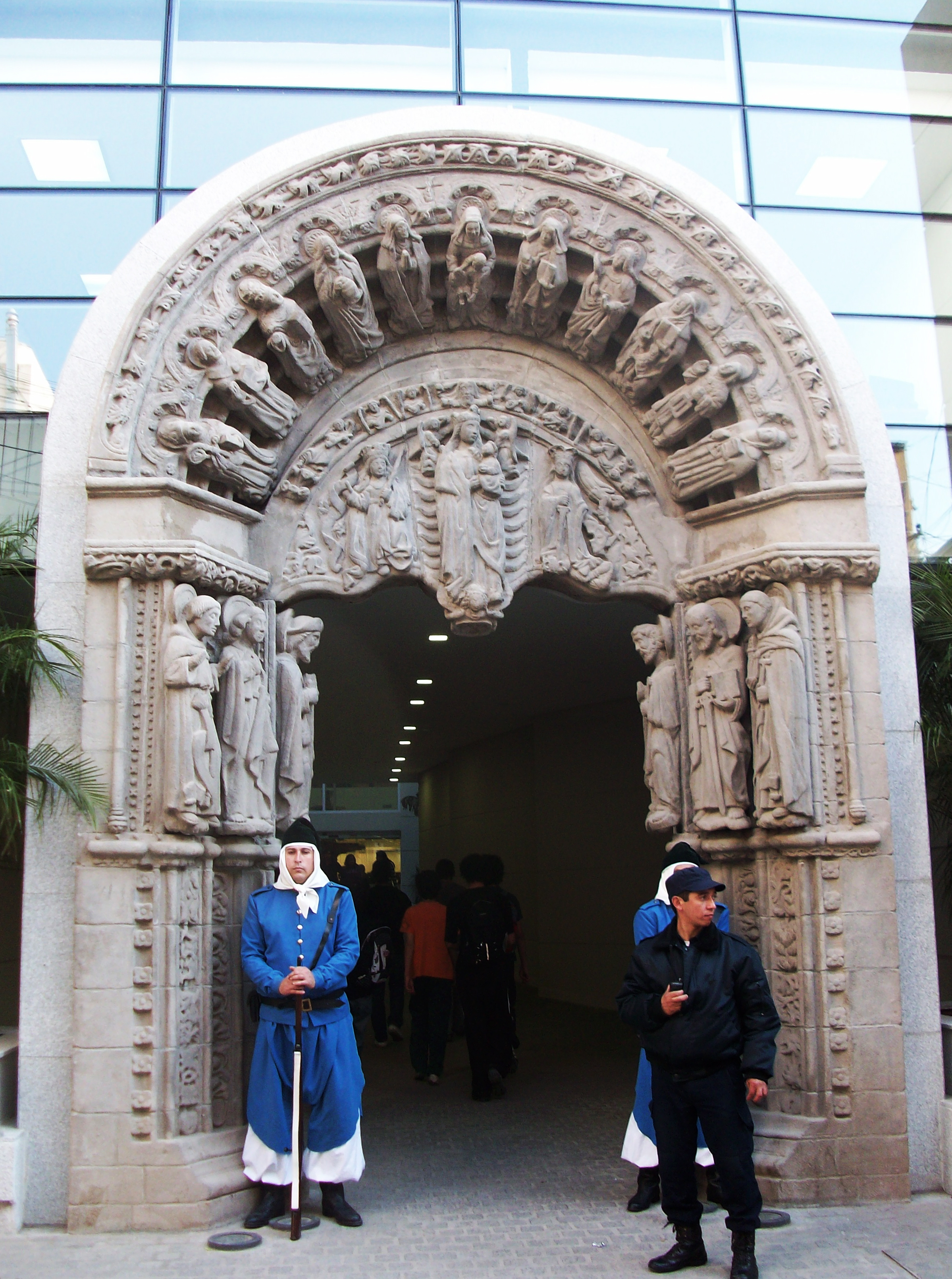
Entrance to the bicentennial cultural centre

== See also ==
- 1817 Santiago del Estero earthquake
