= Los Núñez =

Coordinates: 27°32′S 64°32′W

- Municipality and village
- Interactive map of Los Núñez
- Country: Argentina
- Province: Santiago del Estero
- Time zone: UTC−3 (ART)

Los Núñez is a municipality and village in Santiago del Estero in Argentina.
