= University train of La Plata =

Commuter rail line in Argentina

Tren Universitario
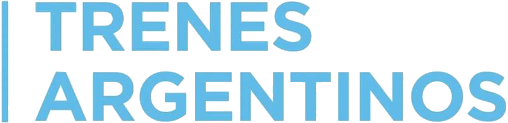

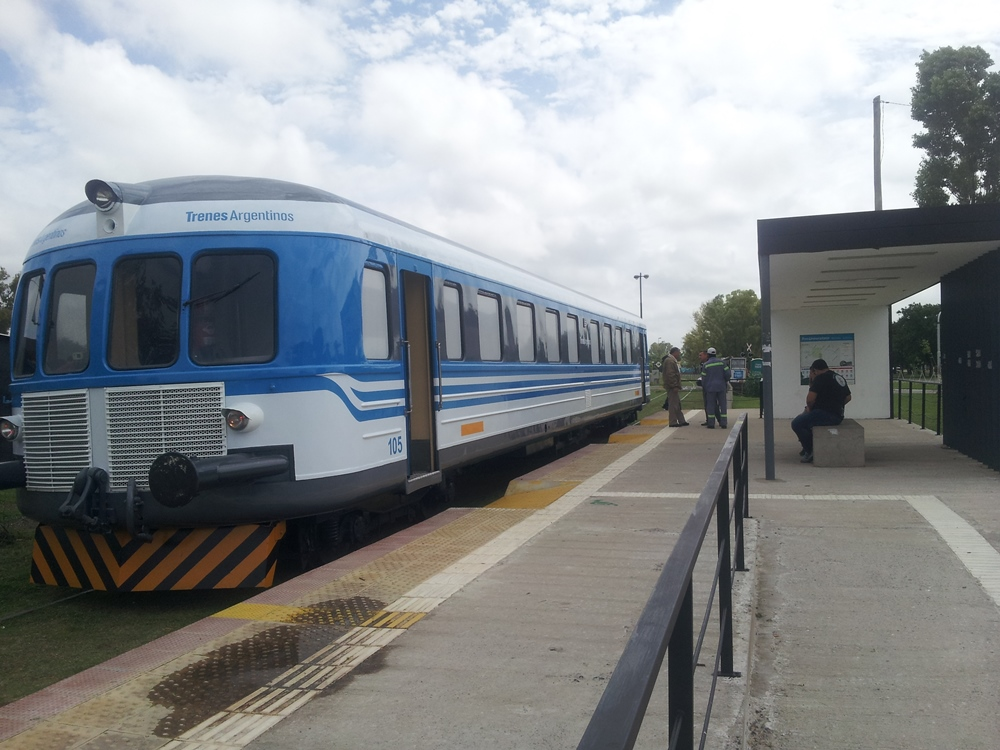
- A NOHAB railcar stopped at a station (2014).

Overview
- Service type: Commuter rail
- Locale: La Plata
- First service: 26 April 2013; 13 years ago
- Current operator: Trenes Argentinos
- Website: Tren Universitario

Route
- Termini: La Plata; Hospital San Juan de Dios
- Stops: 9
- Distance travelled: 8.4 km (5.2 mi)
- Average journey time: 38 minutes
- Service frequency: 40 minutes
- Line used: Roca Line

On-board services
- Seating arrangements: Yes

Technical
- Track gauge: 1,676 mm (5 ft 6 in)
- Operating speed: 30 km/h (19 mph)
- Track owner: Government of Argentina

The University train of La Plata is a commuter rail service part of Roca Line, currently being operated by State-owned company Trenes Argentinos. Trains run within La Plata city of Buenos Aires Province in Argentina.

== History ==
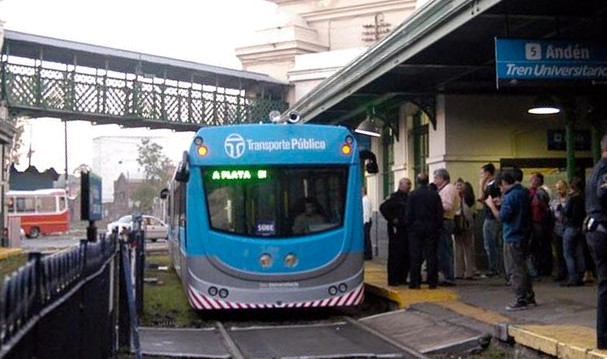
Former Tecnotren rolling stock.

The service was officially opened on 26 April 2013. The units are railbuses powered by a 1.7-litre diesel engines manufactured by FIAT and were manufactured and assembled by TecnoTren, a local company which developed a train that runs on abandoned tracks.

The train runs through the Paseo del Bosque of La Plata, connecting La Plata station with the University of La Plata campus buildings, finishing its trip at the "General San Martín" polyclinic.

The service was interrupted in February 2014 when the units were sent to workshops for maintenance and inspection works, service resumed one month later. In December 2014, the TecnoTren units were replaced by NOHAB railcars built in 1948 and imported in the 2000s from Portugal.

State-owned company Trenes Argentinos took over Roca line (operated by Argentren) after the Government of Argentina rescinded the contracts signed with the company on 2 March 2015. The contract terms specified that the concession could be cancelled with no right to claim compensation. The agreements had been signed in February 2014, committing Argentren and Corredores Ferroviarios to operate the lines.

In March 2020, an agreement was signed between the National University of La Plata and the Ministry of Transport to build an extension of 6.8 kilometres (4.2 mi) length from Policlínico to the city of Los Hornos, also building six new station along that route. The tender was launched in April 2021, with an estimated end of construction in April 2022. As of October 2023, the project has not been carried out.

In September 2023, the train line was extended to the "Hospital San Juan de Dios" station. Works included the addition of 3,8 kilometres of track and four station. Likewise the Government of Argentina and the University of La Plata announced plans to extend the line to the railway workshops in Los Hornos, and reach the cities of Berisso and Ensenada in a further stage.

=== Historic operators ===
Companies that have operated the University train have been:

Company	Period
Argentren	2013–2015
Trenes Argentinos	2015–present
