= Petit-Enghien =

Coordinates: 50°41′N 4°5′E

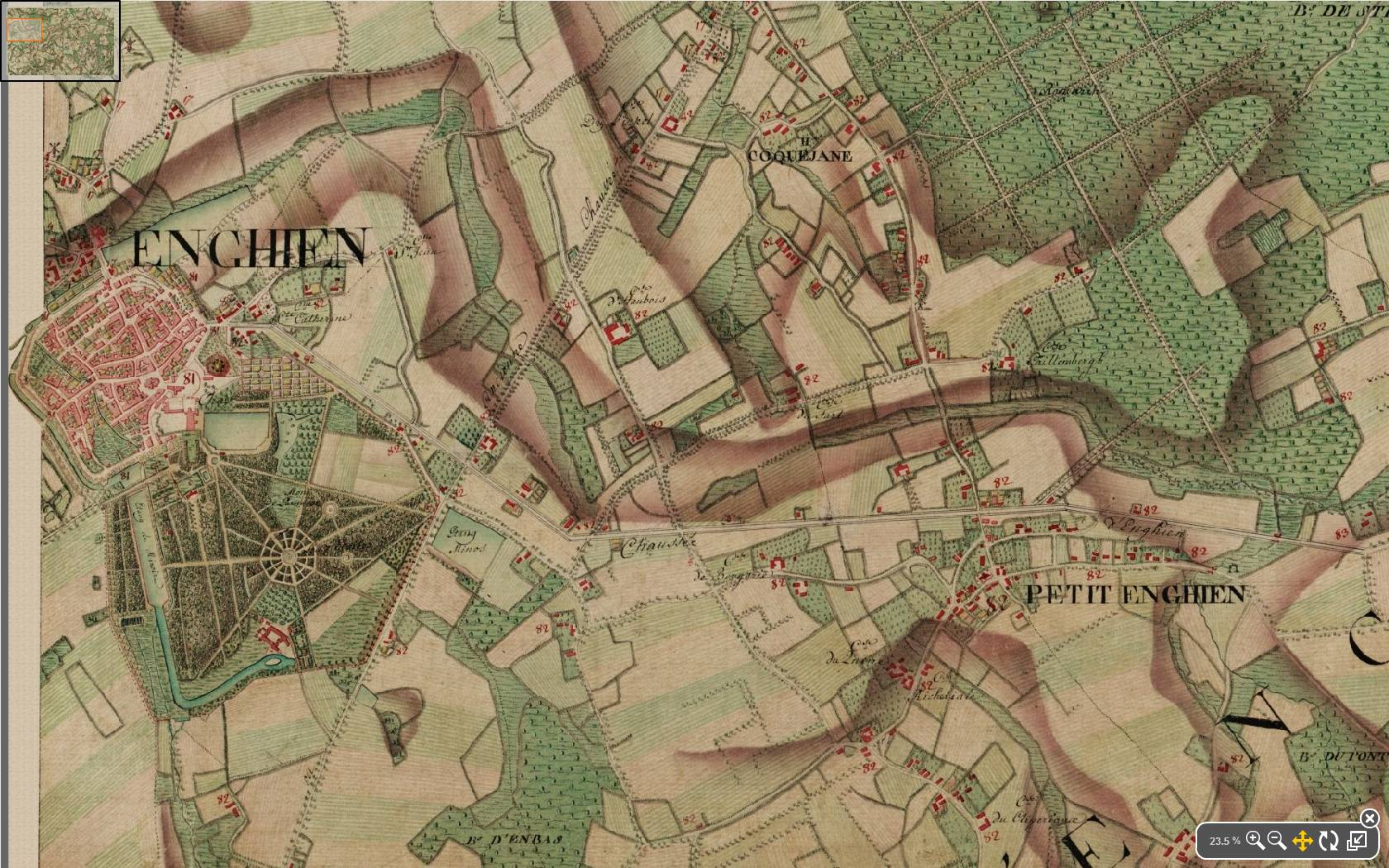
Petit-Enghien (at right) in relation to Enghien on the Ferraris map, 1775

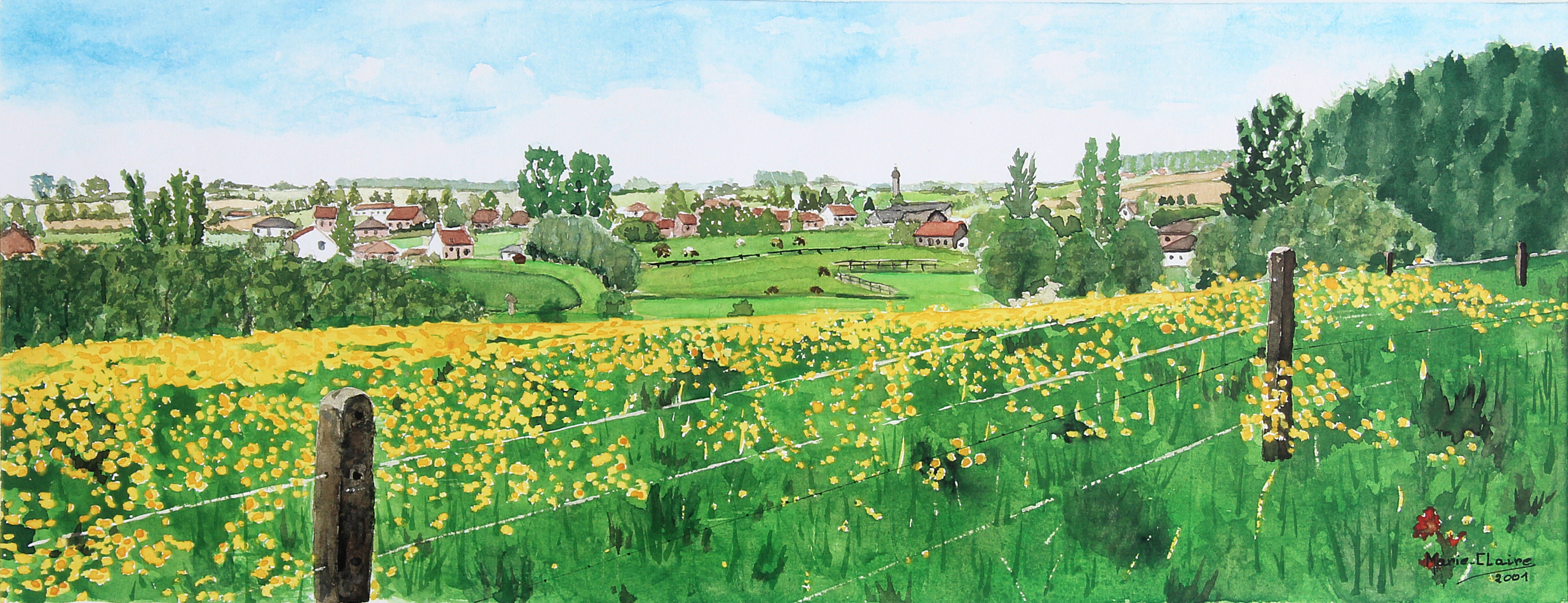
Petit-Enghien (2001).

Petit-Enghien (Dutch: Lettelingen; Walloon: Piti-Inguî) is a town of Wallonia and a district of the municipality of Enghien, located in the province of Hainaut, Belgium.

It was a municipality until the fusion of the Belgian municipalities in 1977. At the time, the municipality also included the village of Marcq.

Petit-Enghien has around 1770 inhabitants. As with Enghien, Petit-Enghien was originally Dutch-speaking, but became majority French-speaking mostly through the education system. Petit-Enghien is near the language border, and as part of Enghien, it is a municipality with language facilities.

Petit-Enghien was the site of Belgian cyclist and multiple Tour de France winner Eddy Merckx's first ever victory on October 1, 1961.
