= Eddy Merckx =

Belgian cyclist (born 1945)

Baron Merckx
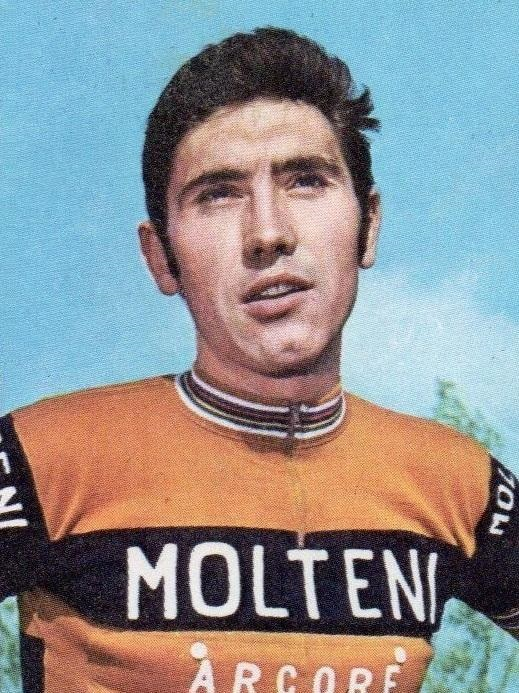
- Eddy Merckx in 1971

Personal information
- Full name: Édouard Louis Joseph Merckx
- Nicknames: Le Cannibale; De Kannibaal (The Cannibal)
- Born: 17 June 1945 (age 81) Meensel-Kiezegem, Belgium
- Height: 1.82 m (5 ft 11 1/2 in)
- Weight: 74 kg (163 lb; 11 st 9 lb)

Cycling career
- Sport: Cycling
- Disciplines: Road and track
- Role: Rider
- Rider type: All-rounder

Amateur team
- 1961–1964: Evere Kerkhoek Sportif

Professional teams
- 1965: Solo–Superia
- 1966–1967: Peugeot–BP–Michelin
- 1968–1970: Faema
- 1971–1976: Molteni
- 1977: Fiat France
- 1978: C&A

Major wins
- Road Grand Tours Tour de France General classification (1969, 1970, 1971, 1972, 1974) Points classification (1969, 1971, 1972) Mountains classification (1969, 1970) Combination classification (1969, 1970, 1971, 1972, 1974) 34 individual stages (1969–1972, 1974, 1975) 6 TTT stages (1969, 1970, 1971, 1972, 1974, 1977) Combativity award (1969, 1970, 1974, 1975) Giro d'Italia General classification (1968, 1970, 1972, 1973, 1974) Points classification (1968, 1973) Mountains classification (1968) Combination classification (1972, 1973) 24 individual stages (1967–1970, 1972, 1973, 1974) 1 TTT stage (1973) Vuelta a España General classification (1973) Points classification (1973) Combination classification (1973) 6 individual stages (1973) 1 TTT stage (1973) Stage races Giro di Sardegna (1968, 1971, 1973, 1975) Tour de Romandie (1968) Volta a Catalunya (1968) Paris–Nice (1969, 1970, 1971) Tour of Belgium (1970, 1971) Critérium du Dauphiné Libéré (1971) Grand Prix du Midi Libre (1971) Tour de Suisse (1974) One-day races and Classics World Road Race Championships (1967, 1971, 1974) National Road Race Championships (1970) Milan–San Remo (1966, 1967, 1969, 1971, 1972, 1975, 1976) Paris–Roubaix (1968, 1970, 1973) Tour of Flanders (1969, 1975) Liège–Bastogne–Liège (1969, 1971, 1972, 1973, 1975) Giro di Lombardia (1971, 1972) La Flèche Wallonne (1967, 1970, 1972) Gent–Wevelgem (1967, 1970, 1973) Omloop Het Volk (1971, 1973) Amstel Gold Race (1973, 1975) Other Super Prestige Pernod International (1969, 1970, 1971, 1972, 1973, 1974, 1975) Hour Record (1972) Track European Championships Madison (1970, 1977) Omnium (1975) National Championships Madison (1966, 1967, 1968, 1974, 1975, 1976)
Medal record
Representing Belgium
Men's road bicycle racing
World Championships
Gold medal – first place	1964 Sallanches	Amateurs' road race
Gold medal – first place	1967 Heerlen	Professional road race
Gold medal – first place	1971 Mendrisio	Professional road race
Gold medal – first place	1974 Montréal	Professional road race
Men's track cycling
European Championships
Gold medal – first place	1970 Köln	Madison
Gold medal – first place	1975 Grenoble	Omnium
Gold medal – first place	1977 Copenhagen	Madison
Silver medal – second place	1968 Gent	Omnium
Silver medal – second place	1970 Gent	Omnium

Édouard Louis Joseph, Baron Merckx (born 17 June 1945), is a Belgian former professional road and track cyclist racer who is the most successful rider in the history of competitive cycling. His victories include an unequalled eleven Grand Tours (five Tours de France, five Giros d'Italia, and a Vuelta a España), all five Monuments, setting the hour record, three World Championships, every major one-day race other than Paris–Tours, and extensive victories on the track.

Born in Meensel-Kiezegem, Brabant, Belgium, he grew up in Woluwe-Saint-Pierre where his parents ran a grocery store. He played several sports, but found his true passion in cycling. Merckx got his first bicycle at the age of three or four and competed in his first race in 1961. His first victory came at Petit-Enghien in October 1961.

After winning 80 races as an amateur, he turned professional on 29 April 1965 when he signed with Solo–Superia. His first major victory came in the Milan–San Remo a year later, after switching to Peugeot–BP–Michelin. After the 1967 season, Merckx moved to Faema, and won the Giro d'Italia, his first Grand Tour victory. Four times between 1970 and 1974, Merckx completed a Grand Tour double. His final double also coincided with winning the elite men's road race at the UCI Road World Championships to make him the first rider to accomplish cycling's Triple Crown. Merckx broke the hour record in October 1972, extending the record by almost 800 metres.

He acquired the nickname "the Cannibal", suggested by the daughter of a teammate upon being told by her father of how Merckx would not let anyone else win. Merckx achieved 525 victories over his eighteen-year career. He is one of only three riders to have won all five 'Monuments' (Milan–San Remo, Tour of Flanders, Paris–Roubaix, Liège–Bastogne–Liège, and the Giro di Lombardia) and the only one to have won them all at least twice. Merckx was successful on the road and also on the track, as well as in the large stage races and one-day races. He is almost universally regarded as the greatest and most successful rider in the history of cycling.

Since Merckx's retirement from the sport on 18 May 1978, he has remained active in the cycling world. He began his own bicycle brand, Eddy Merckx Cycles, in 1980 and its bicycles were used by several professional teams in the 1980s, 1990s and early 2000s. Merckx coached the Belgian national cycling team for eleven years, stopping in 1996. He helped start and organize the Tour of Qatar from its start in 2002 until its final edition in 2016. He also assisted in running the Tour of Oman, before a disagreement with the organizers led him to step away in 2017.

== Early life and amateur career ==
Édouard Louis Joseph Merckx was born in Meensel-Kiezegem, Brabant, Belgium, on 17 June 1945 to Jules Merckx and Jenny Pittomvils. Merckx was the first-born of the family. In September 1946, the family moved to Sint-Pieters-Woluwe, in Brussels, Belgium, in order to take over a grocery shop that had been up for lease. In May 1948, Jenny gave birth to twins: a boy, Michel, and a girl, Micheline. As a child Eddy was hyperactive and was always playing outside.

Eddy was a competitive child and played several sports, including basketball, football, table tennis and boxing, the latter in which he won some local boxing tournaments. He even played lawn tennis for the local junior team. However, Merckx claimed he knew he wanted to be a cyclist at the age of four and that his first memory was a crash on his bike when he was the same age. Merckx began riding a bike at the age of three or four and would ride to school every day, beginning at age eight. Merckx would imitate his cycling idol Stan Ockers with his friends when they rode bikes together.

In summer 1961, Merckx bought his first racing license and competed in his first official race a month after he turned sixteen, coming in sixth place. He rode in twelve more races before winning his first, at Petit-Enghien, on 1 October 1961. In the winter following his first victory, he trained with former racer Félicien Vervaecke at the local velodrome. Merckx won his second victory on 11 March 1962 in a kermis race. Merckx competed in 55 races during the 1962 calendar year; as he devoted more time to cycling, his grades at school began to decline. After winning the Belgian amateur road race title, Merckx declined an offer from his school's headmaster to have his exams postponed, and dropped out of school. He finished the season with 23 victories to his name.

Merckx won the amateur road race at the 1964 UCI Road World Championships in Sallanches, France. The following month, he came twelfth in the individual road race at the Tokyo Olympics. Merckx remained an amateur until April 1965, and finished his amateur career with eighty wins to his credit.

== Professional career ==
=== 1965–1967: Solo–Superia and Peugeot–BP–Michelin ===
==== 1965: First professional season ====
Merckx turned professional on 29 April 1965 when he signed with Rik Van Looy's Belgian team, Solo–Superia. He won his first race in Vilvoorde, beating Emile Daems. On 1 August, Merckx finished second in the Belgian national championships, which qualified him for the men's road race at the UCI Road World Championships. Raphaël Géminiani, the manager of the Bic cycling team, approached Merckx at the event and offered him 2,500 francs a month to join the team the following season. Merckx chose to sign; however, since he was a minor the contract was invalid.

After finishing the road race in 29th position, Merckx returned to Belgium and discussed his plans for the next season with his manager Jean Van Buggenhout. Van Buggenhout helped orchestrate a move that sent Merckx to the French-based Peugeot–BP–Michelin for 20,000 francs a month. Merckx elected to leave Solo–Superia due to the way he was treated by his teammates, in particular Van Looy. Van Looy and other teammates mocked Merckx for his various habits such as his eating, or called him names. In addition, Merckx later stated that during his time with Van Looy's team he had not been taught anything. While with Solo–Superia, he won nine races out of the nearly 70 races he entered.

==== 1966: First Monument victory ====
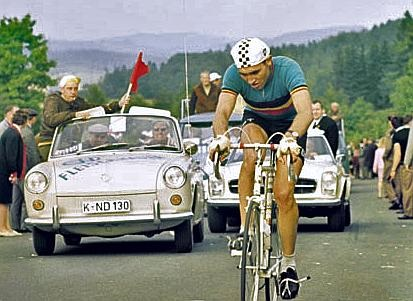
Merckx finished in twelfth position in the men's road race at the 1966 UCI Road World Championships

In March 1966, Merckx entered his first major stage race as a professional rider, the Paris–Nice. He took the race lead for a single stage before losing it to Jacques Anquetil and eventually coming in fourth overall. Milan–San Remo, his first participation in one of cycling's Monuments, was the next event on the calendar for Merckx. There, he succeeded in staying with the main field as the race entered the final climb of the Poggio. He attacked on the climb and reduced the field to a group of eleven, himself included. Merckx was advised by his manager to hold off on sprinting full-out to the finish line until as late as possible. At the end of the race, three other riders approached the line with him, and Merckx beat them in the sprint. In the following weeks, he raced the Tour of Flanders and Paris–Roubaix, the most important cobbled classics; in the former he crashed and in the latter he had a punctured tire. At the 1966 UCI Road World Championships he finished twelfth in the road race after suffering a cramp in the closing kilometers. He finished the 1966 season with a total of 20 wins, including his first stage race win at the Tour of Morbihan.

==== 1967: Second straight Milan–San Remo and world champion ====
Merckx opened the 1967 campaign with two stage victories at the Giro di Sardegna. He followed these successes by entering Paris–Nice where he won the second stage and took the race lead. Two stages later, a teammate, Tom Simpson, attacked with several other riders on a climb and was nearly 20 minutes ahead of Merckx, who remained in a group behind. Merckx attacked two days later on a climb 70 km into the stage. He was able to establish a firm advantage, but obeyed orders from his manager to wait for the chasing Simpson. Merckx won the stage, while Simpson secured his overall victory.

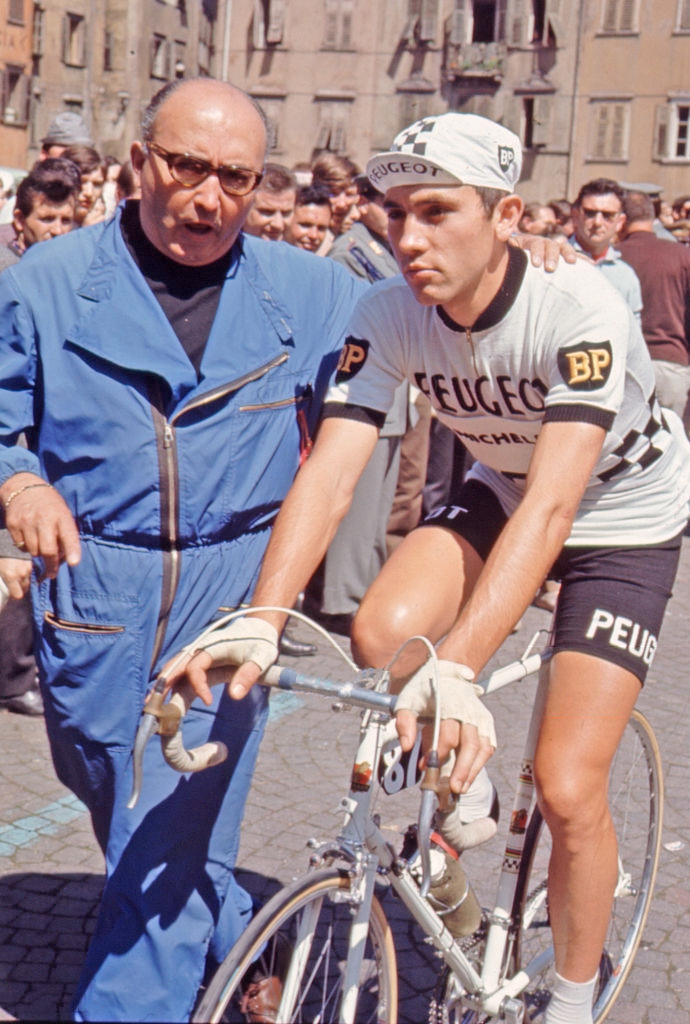
At the 1967 Giro d'Italia Merckx won his first Grand Tour stages on the way to finishing ninth overall

On 18 March, Merckx started the Milan–San Remo and was seen as a 120–1 favorite to win the race. He attacked on the Capo Berta and again on the Poggio, leaving only Gianni Motta with him. The two slowed their pace and were joined by two more riders. Merckx won the four-man sprint to the finish. His next victory came in La Flèche Wallonne after he missed out on an early break, caught up to it, and attacked from it to win the race. On 20 May, he started the Giro d'Italia, his first Grand Tour. He won the twelfth and fourteenth stages en route to finishing ninth in the general classification.

He signed with Faema on 2 September for ten years worth 400,000 Belgian francs. He chose to switch over in order to be in complete control over the team he was racing for. In addition, he would not have to pay for various expenses that came with racing such as wheels and tires. The next day, Merckx started the men's road race at the 1967 UCI Road World Championships in Heerlen, Netherlands. The course consisted of ten laps of a circuit. Motta attacked on the first lap and was joined by Merckx and five other riders. The group thinned to five as they reached the finish line where Merckx was able to out-sprint Jan Janssen for first place. In doing so, he became the third rider to win the world road race amateur and professional titles. By winning the race he earned the right to wear the rainbow jersey as world champion.

=== 1968–1970: Faema ===
==== 1968: First Grand Tour victory ====
Merckx's first victory with his new team came in a stage win at the Giro di Sardegna. At Paris–Nice, he was forced to quit the race due to a knee injury he sustained during the event. He failed to win his third consecutive Milan–San Remo and missed out at the Tour of Flanders the following weekend. His next victory came at Paris–Roubaix when he bested Herman Van Springel in a race that was plagued by poor weather and several punctures to the competing riders. At the behest of his team, Merckx raced the Giro d'Italia instead of the Tour de France. He won the race's second stage after he attacked with one kilometer to go. The twelfth stage was marred by rainy weather and featured the climbs of the Tre Cime di Lavaredo for the stage finish. By the time Merckx had reached the penultimate climb, there was a six-man group at the front of the race with a nine-minute advantage. Merckx attacked and was able to get a sizable distance between himself and the group he left before he stopped to change his wheel in order to slow down due to orders from his team manager. Merckx got back on his bike and caught the leading breakaway and rode past it to the finish, where he won the stage and took the race lead. Merckx went on to win the race, along with the points classification and mountains classification. In the Volta a Catalunya, Merckx took the race lead from Gimondi in the race's time trial stage and won the event as a whole. He finished the season with 32 wins in the 129 races he entered.

==== 1969: A victory in Paris and injury in Blois ====
Merckx opened the 1969 season with victories at the Vuelta a Levante and the Paris–Nice overall, as well as stages in each of the races. On 30 March 1969 Merckx earned his first major victory of the 1969 calendar with his win at the Tour of Flanders. On a rainy day that featured strong winds, he attacked first on the Oude Kwaremont, but a puncture nullified any gains he was able to establish. He made a move on the Kapelmuur and was followed by a few riders. As the wind shifted from a crosswind to a headwind with close to seventy kilometers left to go, Merckx increased the pace and rode solo to victory. The 17 days after the Tour of Flanders saw Merckx win nine times. He won Milan–San Remo by descending the Poggio at high speed. Merckx saw victory again in mid-April at the Liège–Bastogne–Liège when he attacked with 70 kilometers remaining.

He began the Giro d'Italia on 16 May, stating that he wished to ride less aggressively than the year before in order to save energy for the Tour de France. Merckx had won four of the race's stages and held the race lead going into the sixteenth day of racing. However, before the start of the stage race director Vincenzo Torriani, along with a television camera and two writers, entered Merckx's hotel room and informed him that he had failed a doping control and was disqualified from the race, in addition to being suspended for a month. On 14 June, the cycling governing body, the FICP, overturned the month long suspension and cleared him due to the "benefit of the doubt."

The Velodrome Eddy Merckx at Mourenx was named in honor of Merckx in 1999 due to his efforts during the seventeenth stage at the 1969 Tour de France

Before starting the Tour, Merckx had spent a large amount of his time resting and training, racing only five times. Merckx won the race's sixth stage through attacking before the leg's final major climb, the Ballon d'Alsace, and then outlasting his competitors who were able to follow him initially. During the seventeenth stage, Merckx was riding at the head of the race with several general classification contenders on the Col du Tourmalet. Merckx shifted into a large gear, attacked, and went on to cross the summit with a 45-second advantage. Despite orders to wait for the chasing riders, Merckx increased his efforts. He rode over the Col du Soulor and Col d'Aubisque, increasing the gap to eight minutes. With close to fifty kilometers to go, Merckx began to suffer hypoglycemia and rode the rest of the stage in severe pain. At the end of the stage, Merckx told the journalists "I hope I have done enough now for you to consider me a worthy winner." Merckx finished the race with six stage victories to his credit, along with the general, points, mountains, and combination classifications, and the award for most aggressive rider.

His next major race was the two-day race, Paris–Luxembourg. Merckx was down fifty-four seconds going into the second day and attacked eight kilometers from the finish, on the slopes of the Bereldange. Merckx rode solo to catch the leading rider Jacques Anquetil, whom he dropped with a kilometer remaining. Merckx won the stage and gained enough time on the race leader Gimondi to win the race.

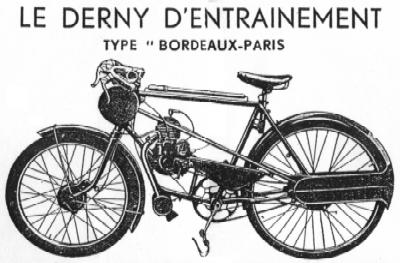
Fernand Wambst, who was regarded as a great derny driver, agreed to pace Merckx in the omnium events in Blois

On 9 September, Merckx participated in a three-round omnium event at the concrete velodrome in Blois where each rider was to be paced by a derny. Fernand Wambst was Merckx's pacer for the contest. After winning the first intermediate sprint of the first round, Wambst chose to slow their pace and move to the back of the race despite Merckx wanting to stay out in front for fear of an accident. Wambst wanted to pass everyone to provide a show for the crowd. The duo then increased their pace and began to pass each of the other contestants; however, as they passed the riders in first position, the leading derny lost control and crashed into the wall. Wambst chose to avoid the derny by going below it, but the leader's derny came back down and collided with Wambst, while Merckx's pedal caught one of the dernies. The two riders landed head first onto the track.

‘’Blois was the worst experience of my career. Here I could have been dead. The accident cost me a few years of my career, because afterwards, with that back, I never had the same feeling uphill as I had in that very first Tour of ‘69.’'

— Eddy Merckx in 2005

Wambst died of a fractured skull as he was being transported to a hospital. Merckx remained unconscious for 45 minutes and awoke in the operating room. He sustained a concussion, whiplash, trapped nerves in his back, a displaced pelvis, and several other cuts and bruises. He remained at the hospital for a week before returning to Belgium. He spent six weeks in bed before beginning to race again in October. Merckx later stated that he "was never the same again" after the crash. He would constantly adjust the height of his seat during races to help ease the pain.

==== 1970: A Giro–Tour double ====
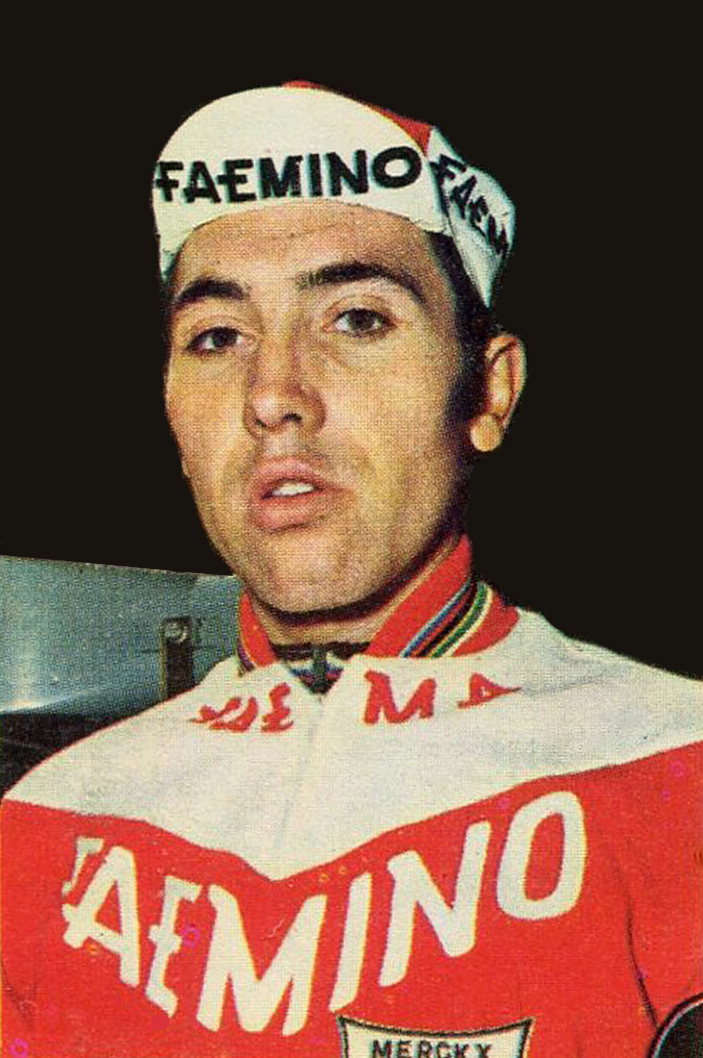
Merckx with Faemino–Faema in 1970

Merckx entered the 1970 campaign nursing a case of mild tendonitis in his knee. His first major victory came in Paris–Nice where he won the general classification, along with three stages. On 1 April, Merckx won the Gent–Wevelgem, followed by the Tour of Belgium – where he braved a snowy stage and followed the day up with a victory in the final time trial to secure the title – and Paris–Roubaix. In Paris–Roubaix, Merckx was battling a cold as the race began in heavy rain. He attacked thirty-one kilometers from the finish and went on to win by five minutes and twenty-one seconds, the largest margin of victory in the history of the race. The next weekend, Merckx attempted to race for teammate Joseph Bruyère in La Flèche Wallonne; however, Bruyère was unable to keep pace with the leading riders, leaving Merckx to take the victory.

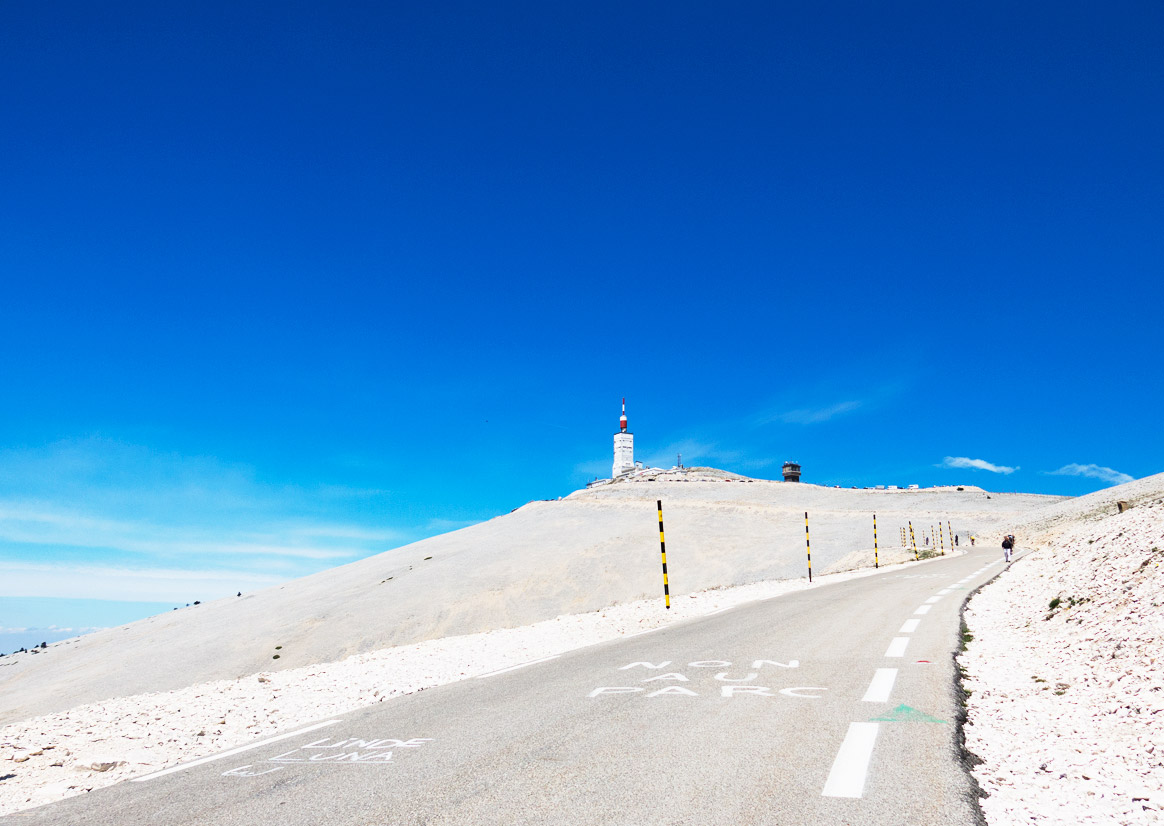
After winning the fourteenth stage to the summit of Mont Ventoux during the 1970 Tour de France, Merckx had to be given oxygen

After the scandal at the previous year's Giro d'Italia, Merckx was unwilling to return to the race in 1970. His entry to the race was contingent upon all doping controls being sent to a lab in Rome to be tested, rather than being tested at the finish like the year before. He started the race and won the second stage, but four days later showed signs of weakness with his knee as he was dropped twice while in the mountains. However the next day, Merckx attacked on the final climb into the city of Brentonico to win the stage and take the lead. He won the stage nine individual time trial by almost two minutes over the second-place finisher, expanding his lead significantly. Merckx did not win another stage, but expanded his lead a little more before the race's conclusion.

Before beginning the Tour, Merckx won the men's road race at the Belgian National Road Race Championships. Merckx won the Tour's opening prologue to take the race's first race leader's yellow jersey. After losing the lead following the second stage, he won the sixth stage after forming a breakaway with Lucien Van Impe and regained the lead. After expanding his lead in the stage nine individual time trial, Merckx won the race's first true mountain stage, stage 10, and expanded his lead to five minutes in the general classification.

Merckx won three of the five stages contested within the next four days, including a summit finish to Mont Ventoux, where upon finishing he was given oxygen. Merckx won two more stages, both individual time trials, and won the Tour by over twelve minutes. He finished the Tour with eight stage victories and won the mountains and combination classifications. The eight stage wins equaled the previous record for stage wins in a single Tour de France. Merckx also became the third to accomplish the feat of winning the Giro and Tour in the same calendar year.

=== 1971–1976: Molteni ===
==== 1971: A third consecutive Tour and second world championship ====
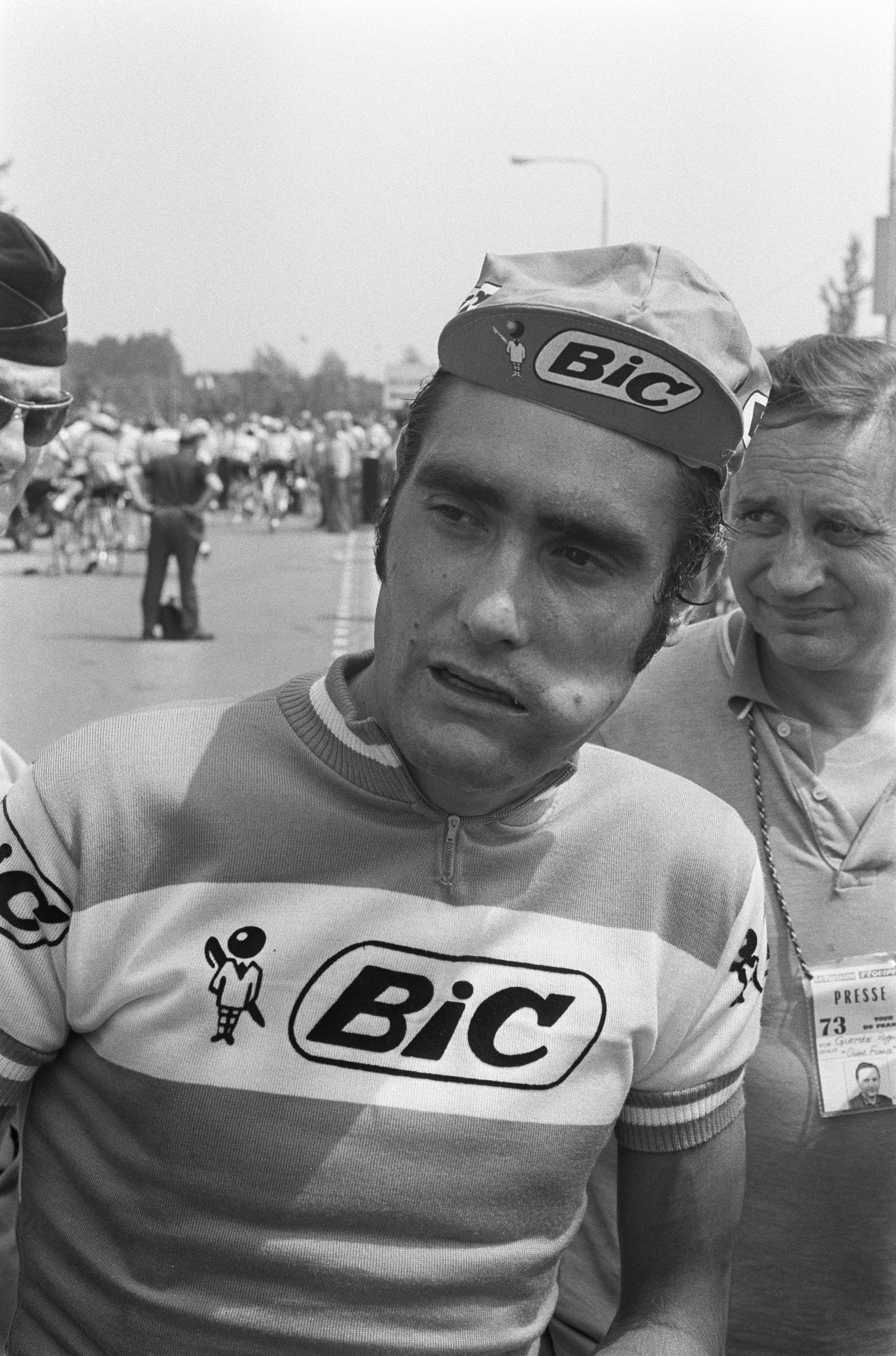
Spaniard Luis Ocaña (pictured at the 1973 Tour de France) was one of Merckx's major rivals during the 1971 Tour de France

Faema folded at the end of the 1970 season causing Merckx and several of his teammates to move to another Italian team, Molteni. The first major victory for Merckx came in the Giro di Sardegna, which he secured after attacking on his own and riding solo through the rain to win the race's final stage. He followed that with his third consecutive Paris–Nice victory, a race he led from start to finish. In the Milan–San Remo, Merckx worked with his teammates in a seven-man breakaway to set up a final attack on the Poggio. Merckx's attack succeeded and he won his fourth edition of the race. Six days later, he won the Omloop Het Volk.

After winning the Tour of Belgium again, Merckx headed into the major spring classics. During the Tour of Flanders, Merckx's rivals worked against him to prevent him from winning. A week later, he suffered five flat tires during the Paris–Roubaix. The Liège–Bastogne–Liège was held in cold and rain conditions. After attacking ninety kilometers from the finish, Merckx caught the leaders on the road and passed them. He rode solo until around three kilometers to go when Georges Pintens caught him. Merckx and Pintens rode to the finish together, where Merckx won the two-man sprint. Instead of racing the Giro d'Italia, Merckx elected to enter two shorter stages races in France, the Grand Prix du Midi Libre and the Critérium du Dauphiné, both of which he won.

The Tour de France began with a team time trial that Merckx's team won, giving him the lead. The next day's racing was split into three parts. Merckx lost the lead after stage 1b, but regained it after stage 1c due to a time bonus that he earned from winning an intermediate sprint. During the second stage, a major break with the major race contenders, including Merckx, formed with over a hundred kilometers to go. The group finished nine minutes ahead of the peloton as Merckx came around Roger De Vlaeminck during the sprint to win the day. After a week of racing, Merckx held a lead of around a minute over the main contenders. The eighth stage saw a mountain top finish to Puy-de-Dôme. Bernard Thévenet attacked on the lower slopes and Merckx was unable to counter. Joop Zoetemelk and Luis Ocaña went with Thévenet and wound up gaining 15 seconds on Merckx.

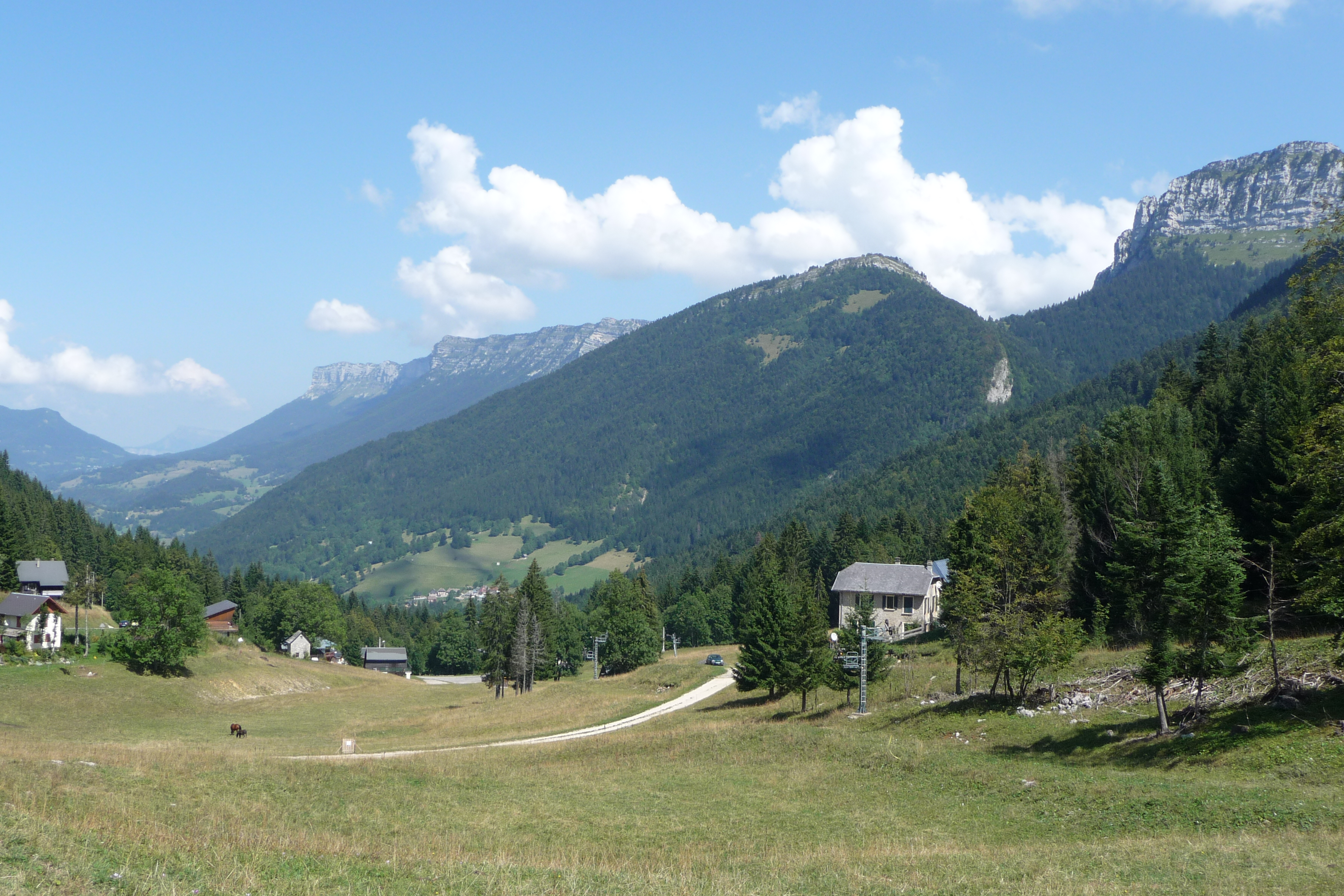
While descending the Col du Cucheron during the ninth stage of the 1971 Tour de France, Merckx suffered a puncture. Seeing this, his rivals attacked and wound up gaining 1' 30" on Merckx

On the descent of the Col du Cucheron during the race's ninth leg, Merckx's tire punctured, prompting Ocaña to attack with Zoetemelk, Thévenet, and Gösta Pettersson. The group of four finished a minute and a half ahead of Merckx, giving Zoetemelk the lead. The following day Merckx lost eight minutes to Ocaña after a poor showing due to stomach pains and indigestion. At the start of the eleventh stage, Merckx, three teammates, and a couple of others formed a breakaway. Merckx's group finished two minutes in front of the peloton that was led by Ocaña's Bic team. After winning the ensuing time trial, Merckx took back eleven more seconds on Ocaña. The race entered the Pyrenees with the first stage, into Luchon, being plagued by heavy thunderstorms that severely handicapped vision. On the descent of the Col de Menté, Merckx crashed on a left bend. Ocaña, who was trailing, crashed into the same bend and Zoetemelk collided with him. Merckx fell again on the descent and took the race lead as Ocaña was forced to retire from the race due to injuries from the crash. Merckx declined to wear the yellow jersey the following day out of respect for Ocaña. He won two more stages and the general, points, and combination classifications when the race finished in Paris.

Seven weeks following the Tour, Merckx entered the men's road race at the UCI Road World Championships that were held in Mendrisio, Switzerland. The route for the day was rather hilly and consisted of several circuits. Merckx was a part of a five-man breakaway as the race reached five laps to go.

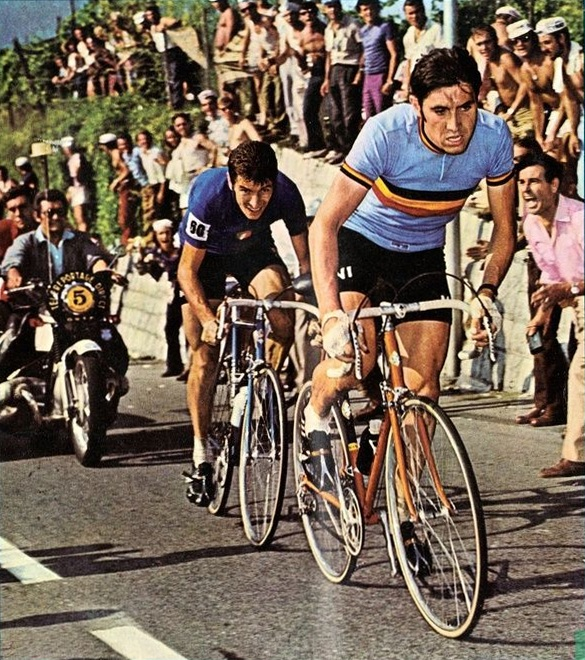
Merckx followed by Felice Gimondi during the 1971 UCI Road World Championships final

After attacking on the second to last stage, Merckx and Gimondi reached the finish, where Merckx won the race by four bike lengths. This earned him his second rainbow jersey. He closed out the 1971 calendar with his first victory in the Giro di Lombardia. This victory meant that Merckx had won all of cycling's Monuments. Merckx made the winning move when he attacked on the descent of the Intelvi Pass. During the off-season, Merckx had his displaced pelvis tended to by a doctor.

==== 1972: Breaking the hour record alongside a Giro–Tour double ====
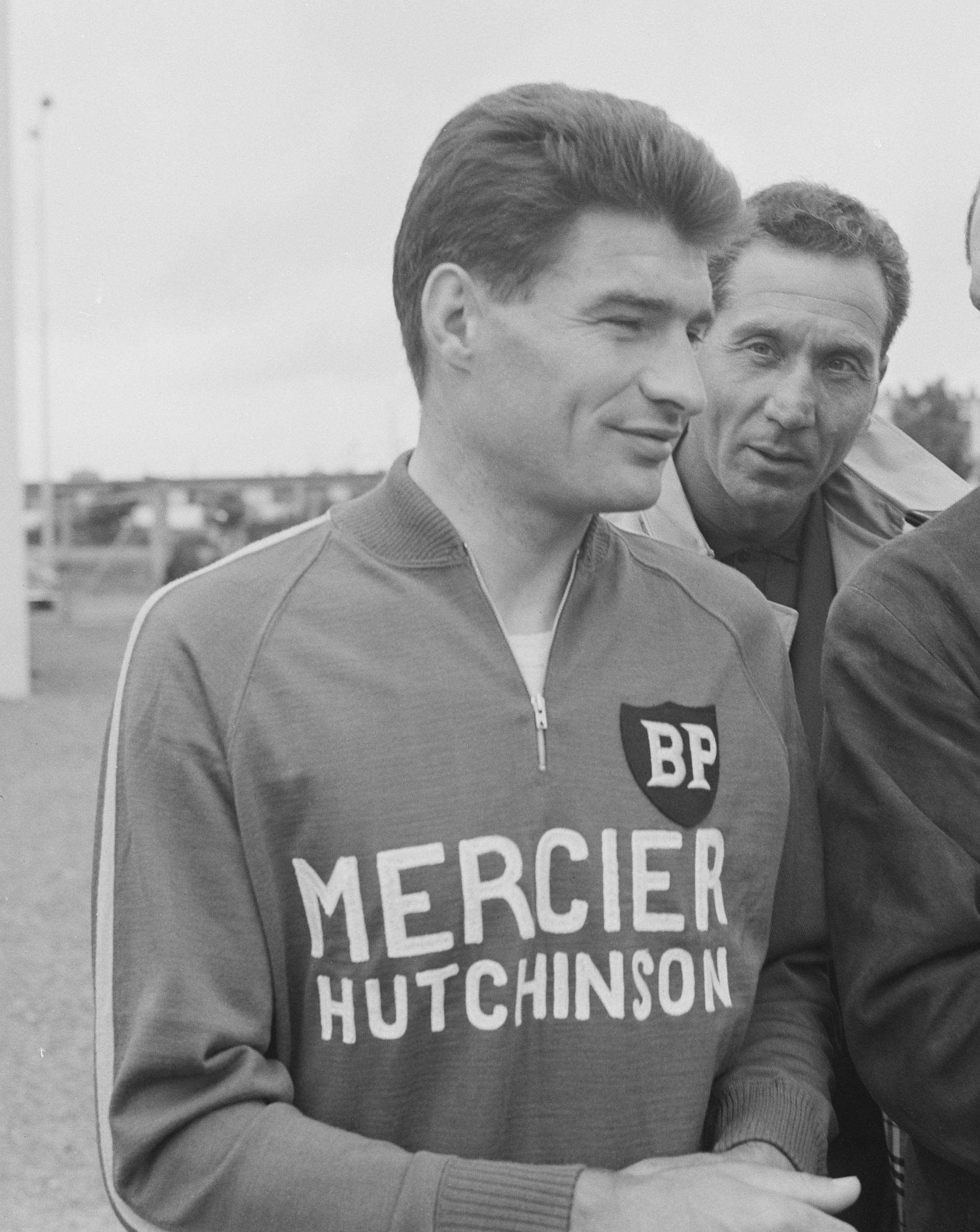
Raymond Poulidor (pictured at the 1966 Tour de France) won 1972 Paris–Nice after taking the lead away from Merckx in the race's final stage, an individual time trial

Due to his non-participation in track racing over the winter, Merckx entered the 1972 campaign in poorer form than in previous years. In the Paris–Nice, Merckx broke a vertebra in a crash that occurred as the peloton was in the midst of a bunch sprint. Against the advice of a physician, he started the next day being barely able to ride out of the saddle, leading Ocaña to attack him several times throughout the stage. In the race's fifth leg, Merckx sprinted away from Ocaña with 150 meters to go to win the day. Merckx lost the race lead in the final stage to Raymond Poulidor and finished in second place overall. Two days removed from Paris–Nice, Merckx was victorious for the fifth time at the Milan–San Remo after he established a gap on the descent of the Poggio.

In Paris–Roubaix, he crashed again, further aggravating the injury he sustained from Paris–Nice. He won Liège–Bastogne–Liège by making a solo move forty-six kilometers from the finish. Three days later, in La Flèche Wallonne, Merckx was a part of a six-man leading group as the race neared its conclusion. Merckx won the uphill sprint to the finish despite his derailleur shifting him to the wrong gear, forcing him to ride in a larger gear than anticipated. He became the third rider to win La Flèche Wallonne and Liège–Bastogne–Liège in the same weekend. Despite a monetary offer from race organizers for Merckx to participate in the Vuelta a España, he chose to take part in the Giro d'Italia.

Merckx lost over two and a half minutes to Spanish climber José Manuel Fuente after the Giro's fourth stage that contained a summit finish to Blockhaus. In the seventh stage, Fuente had attacked on the first climb of the day, the Valico di Monte Scuro. However, Fuente cracked near the top of the climb, allowing for Merckx and Pettersson to catch and pass him. Merckx gained over four minutes on Fuente and became the new race leader. He expanded his lead by two minutes through the stage 12a and 12b time trials, winning the former. Fuente got Merckx on his own as the two climbed together during the fourteenth stage. He and teammate Francisco Galdós attacked, leaving Merckx behind. Merckx eventually reconnected with the two on the final climb of the stage. He proceeded to attack and went on to win the stage by forty-seven seconds. He lost two minutes to Fuente due to stomach trouble during the seventeenth leg that finished atop the Stelvio Pass, but went on to win one more stage en route to his third victory at the Giro d'Italia.

Merckx entered the Tour de France in July where a battle between him and Ocaña was expected by many. He took the opening prologue and expanded his advantage over all the other general classification contenders, except Ocaña, by at least three minutes. Going into the Pyrenees, Merckx led Ocaña by fifty-one seconds. The general classification favorites were riding together as the race hit the Col d'Aubisque in the seventh leg. Ocaña punctured on the climb, allowing for the other riders to attack. Ocaña chased after the group but crashed into a wall on the descent and went on to lose almost two minutes to Merckx. Merckx was criticized for attacking while Ocaña had a flat, but Merckx responded that the year before Ocaña had done the same thing while the race was in the Alps. Merckx won the following stage, regaining the lead which he had lost after the fourth leg. During the next two major mountain stages, one to Mont Ventoux and the other to Orcières, he merely followed Ocaña's wheel. He won three more stages before crossing the finish line in Paris as the race's winner, thus completing his second Giro-Tour double in the process.

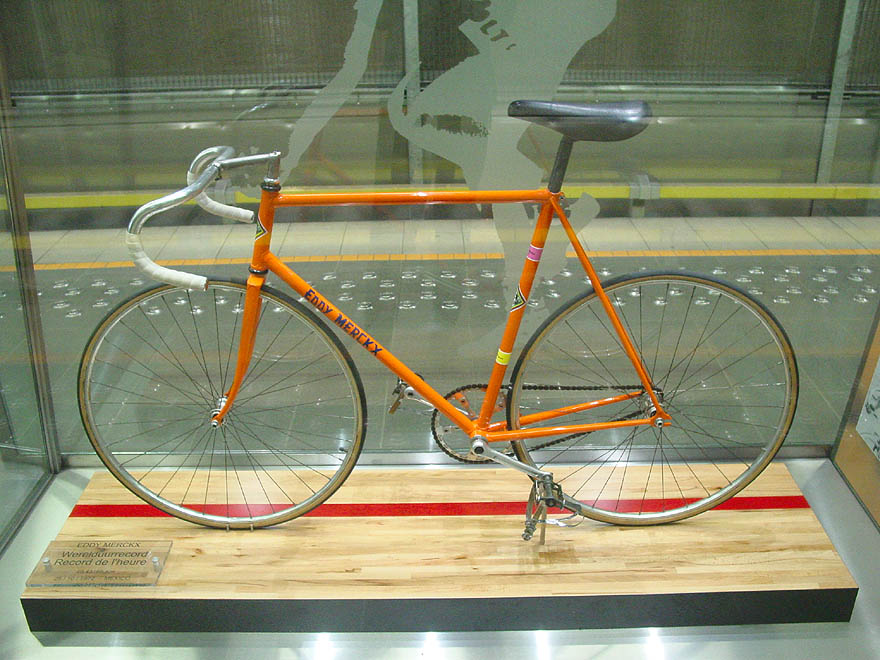
Ernesto Colnago designed the bike Merckx used (pictured) during his hour record attempt to be similar to Merckx's track bike. The bike weighed 5.9 kilograms and saw two hundred hours put into its production

After initially planning to attempt to break the hour record in August, Merckx decided to make the attempt in October after taking a ten-day hiatus from criterium racing to heal and prepare. The attempt took place on 25 October in Mexico City, Mexico at the outdoor track Agustín Melgar. Mexico was chosen due to the higher altitude as this led to less air resistance. He arrived in Mexico on the 21st to prepare for his attempt, but two days were lost due to rain. His attempt started at 8:46 am local time and saw him finish the first ten kilometers twenty-eight seconds faster than the record pace. However, Merckx started off too fast and began to fade as the attempt wore on. He eventually was able to recover and posted a distance of 49.431 km (31 mi), breaking the world record. After finishing he was carried off and was quoted saying the pain was "very, very, very significant."

==== 1973: A Giro–Vuelta double ====
An illness prevented Merckx from taking part in the Milan–San Remo at the start of the 1973 calendar. During a span of 19 days, Merckx won four classics including Omloop Het Volk, Liège–Bastogne–Liège, and Paris–Roubaix. He decided to race the Vuelta a España and the Giro d'Italia, instead of racing the Tour de France. He won the opening prologue of the Vuelta to take an early lead. Despite Ocaña's best efforts, Merckx won a total of six stages on his way to his only Vuelta a España title. In addition to the general classification, Merckx won the race's points classification and combination classifications.

Four days after the conclusion of the Vuelta, Merckx lined up to start the Giro d'Italia. He won the opening two-man time trial with Roger Swerts and the next day's leg as well. Merckx's primary competitor, Fuente, lost a significant amount of time during the second stage. He won the eighth stage which featured a summit finish to Monte Carpegna despite Fuente attacking several times on the ascent. Fuente tried attacking throughout the rest of the race, but was only able to make time gains on the race's penultimate stage. Merckx won the race after leading from start to finish, a feat only previously accomplished by Alfredo Binda and Costante Girardengo. He also became the first rider to win the Giro and Vuelta in the same calendar year.

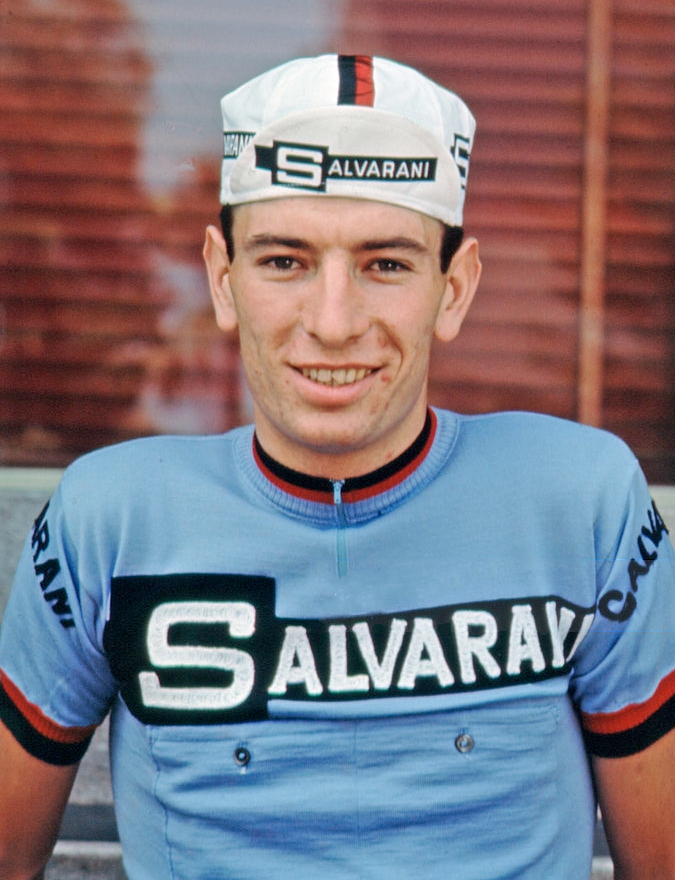
Felice Gimondi (pictured in 1966) won the men's road race at the 1973 UCI Road World Championships, ahead of Merckx who was unable to contest the final sprint to the line, finishing last out of the leading group of four

The UCI Road World Championships were held in Barcelona, Spain in 1973 and contested on the Montjuich circuit. During the road race, Merckx attacked with around one hundred kilometers left. His move was marked by Freddy Maertens, Gimondi, and Ocaña. Merckx attacked on the final lap, but was reeled in by the three riders. It came down to a sprint between the four, of which Merckx came in last and Gimondi in first. Following the road race, Merckx won his first Paris–Brussels and Grand Prix des Nations. He won both legs of À travers Lausanne, as well as the Giro di Lombardia, but a doping positive disqualified him. He closed the season with over fifty victories to his credit.

==== 1974: Completion of cycling's Triple Crown ====
The 1974 season saw Merckx fail to win a spring classic for the first time in his career, in part due to him suffering from various illnesses during the early months. Pneumonia forced him to quit racing for a month and forced him to enter the Giro d'Italia in poor form. He lost time early in the race to Fuente, who took the race's first mountainous stage. Merckx gained time on Fuente in the race's only time trial. Merckx attacked from two hundred kilometers out two days later in a stage that was plagued by horrendous weather. Fuente lost ten minutes to Merckx, who became the race leader. The twentieth stage had a summit finish to Tre Cime di Lavaredo. Fuente and Gianbattista Baronchelli attacked on the climb, while Merckx was unable to match their accelerations. He finished the stage only to see his lead shrink to twelve seconds over Baronchelli. He held on to that lead until the race's conclusion, winning his fifth Giro d'Italia.

Three days following his victory at the Giro, Merckx started the Tour de Suisse. He won the race's prologue and rode conservatively for the rest of the race. He took the final leg, an individual time trial, to seal his overall victory. After finishing the race, Merckx had a sebaceous cyst removed on 22 June. Five days following the surgery, he was scheduled to begin the Tour de France. The wound was still slightly open when he began the Grand Tour and it bled throughout the race.

At the Tour, Merckx won the race's prologue, giving him the first race leader's maillot jaune (English: yellow jersey), which he lost the next day to teammate Joseph Bruyère. He won the seventh stage of the race, and regained the lead, through attacking in the closing kilometers and holding off the chasing peloton. He put five minutes into Poulidor, his main rival, after dropping him on the Col du Galibier. The next day, on the slopes of Mont Ventoux, Merckx rode to limit his losses after suffering several attacks from other general classification riders, including Poulidor, Vicente López Carril and Gonzalo Aja. He expanded his lead through several stage victories afterward, including one where he attacked with ten kilometers to go in a flat stage and held off the peloton to reach the finish in Orléans almost a minute and a half before the chasing group. Merckx finished the Tour with eight stage wins and his fifth Tour de France victory, equaling the record of Anquetil.

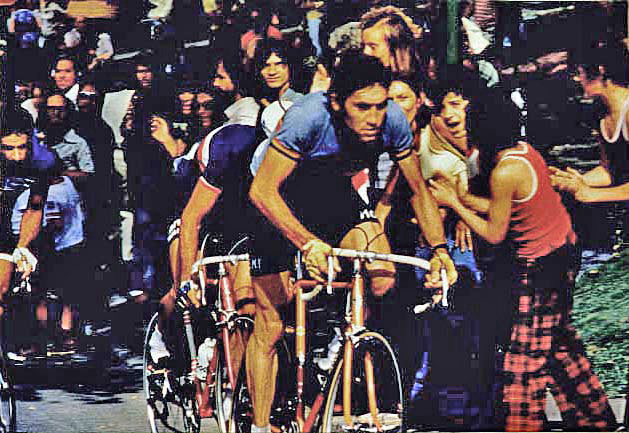
With his victory in the men's road race at the 1974 UCI Road World Championships and his victories in two Grand Tours, the Giro and Tour, Merckx became the first rider to win the Triple Crown of Cycling

Going into the men's road race at the UCI Road World Championships, Merckx anchored a squad that included Van Springel, Maertens, and De Vlaeminck. The route featured twenty-one laps of a circuit that contained two climbs. Merckx and Poulidor attacked with around seven kilometers to go, after catching the leading breakaway. The two rode to the finish together where Merckx won the sprint to the line, establishing a two-second gap between himself and Poulidor. By winning the road race, Merckx became the first rider to win the Triple Crown of Cycling, which consists of winning the Tour de France, Giro d'Italia, and men's road race at the World Championships in one calendar year. It was also his third world title, becoming the third rider to ever be world champion three times, after Binda and Rik Van Steenbergen.

==== 1975: Second place at the Tour ====
With victories at Milan–San Remo and Amstel Gold Race, Merckx opened the 1975 season in good form, also winning the Setmana Catalana de Ciclisme. In the Catalan Week, Merckx lost his super domestique Bruyère, who had helped Merckx to victory in years past many times, to a broken leg. Two days following the Catalan Week, Merckx participated in the Tour of Flanders. He launched an attack with eighty kilometers to go, with only Frans Verbeeck being able to match his acceleration. Verbeeck was dropped as the race reached five kilometers remaining, allowing Merckx to take his third Tour of Flanders victory. In Paris–Roubaix, Merckx suffered a flat tire with around eighty kilometers left when a part of a leading group of four. After chasing for three kilometers, he caught the three other riders and the group rode into the finish together; De Vlaeminck won the day. Merckx won his fifth Liège–Bastogne–Liège by attacking several times in the closing portions of the race.

Merckx's attitude while racing had changed: riders expected him to chase down attacks, which angered him. Notably, in the Tour de Romandie he was riding with race leader Zoetemelk as an attack occurred. Merckx refused to chase the break down, and the two lost 14 minutes. Merckx contracted a cold and, later, tonsilitis while racing in the spring campaign. This caused him to be in poor form, forcing him to not participate in the Giro d'Italia. He then rode in the Dauphiné Libéré and was not on par with Thevenet, who won the race. At the Tour de Suisse, De Vlaeminck won the race as a whole, while Merckx finished second.

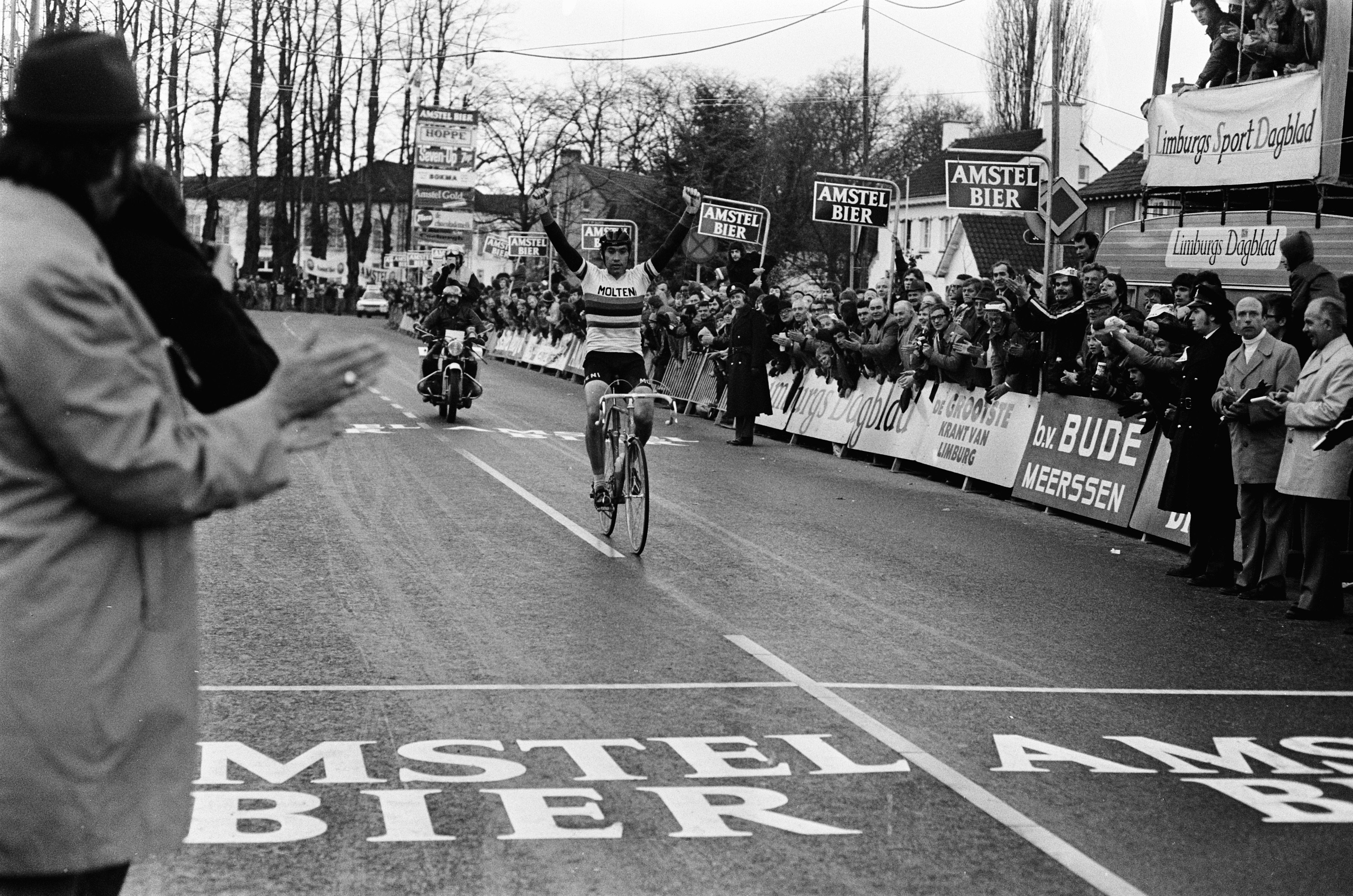
Merckx crossing the finish line to win the 1975 Amstel Gold Race

He placed second in the Tour de France's prologue. The following morning's split stage saw Merckx put time on Thevenet by attacking with Francesco Moser, Van Impe, and Zoetemelk. In day's second leg, Merckx gained time on Zoetemelk. He won the stage six individual time trial and gaining more time on Thevenet and Zoetemelk. He won the next time trial into Auch as well. During the race's eleventh stage, Merckx sent his team to set the pace early on in the stage. Reaching the final climb of the day, Merckx was on his own as his team had been used to set the pace throughout the day. On the day's final climb to Pla d'Adet, he matched an acceleration by Zoetemelk. Thevenet then launched an attack, to which Merckx could not follow and saw him lose over two minutes. After the stage Merckx switched decided to mark Thevenet for the rest of the race and make an attack on the Puy-de-Dôme.

While climbing the Puy-de-Dôme, Thevenet and Van Impe attacked. Merckx followed at his own pace and kept the two riders within a hundred meters. With about 150 m remaining, Merckx was prepared to sprint to the line, but was punched in the back by a spectator, Nello Breton. He crossed the line thirty-four seconds behind Thevenet and proceeded to vomit after catching his breath. The punch left him with a large bruise. During the rest day he was found to have an inflamed liver for which he was prescribed blood thinners.

The stage following the rest day featured five climbs, Merckx felt a pain on the third climb in the area of the punch and had a teammate get him an analgesic. Thevenet attacked several times on the climb of the Col des Champs, all of which Merckx countered. Merckx retaliated by speeding away on the descent. On the start of the next climb, Merckx had his Molteni teammates set the pace and he distanced himself from his competitors before the start of the final climb. However, as Merckx began the final climb he cracked. Thevenet caught and passed him with four kilometers left. Gimondi, Van Impe, and Zoetemelk passed Merckx, who finished fifth and one minute and twenty-six seconds down. The following day, Merckx caught up with the leading breakaway and wanted to push ahead, but the riders chose not to participate in the pace making, leading Merckx to sit up and get caught. He lost two more minutes to Thevenet, who attacked on the Col d'Izoard. He crashed in the next leg, breaking a cheekbone, and gained some time on Thevenet before the finish in Paris. He finished in second place, the first time he had lost a Tour in his six starts.

==== 1976: A record seventh Milan–San Remo ====
He opened his 1976 season with his record seventh victory in Milan–San Remo. He followed with a victory in the Catalan Week, but suffered a crash in the final stage when a spectator's bag caught his handlebars, injuring his elbow. This injury plagued his performance throughout the spring classic season. He entered the Giro d'Italia but failed to win a stage for the first time in his career. He finished the race in eighth overall while battling a saddle boil throughout the race. Following the Giro's conclusion Merckx announced that he and his team Molteni would not take part in the Tour de France. He took part in the men's road race at the UCI Road World Championships and finished in fifth position. He ended his season in October after racing for most of August. He failed to win the Super Prestige Pernod International, a competition where riders were awarded points for their placements in certain professional races, for the first time since 1968. In the first two months of his off-season, Merckx spent the majority of his time lying down. Molteni ended their sponsorship at the end of the season.

=== 1977–1978: Fiat France and C&A ===
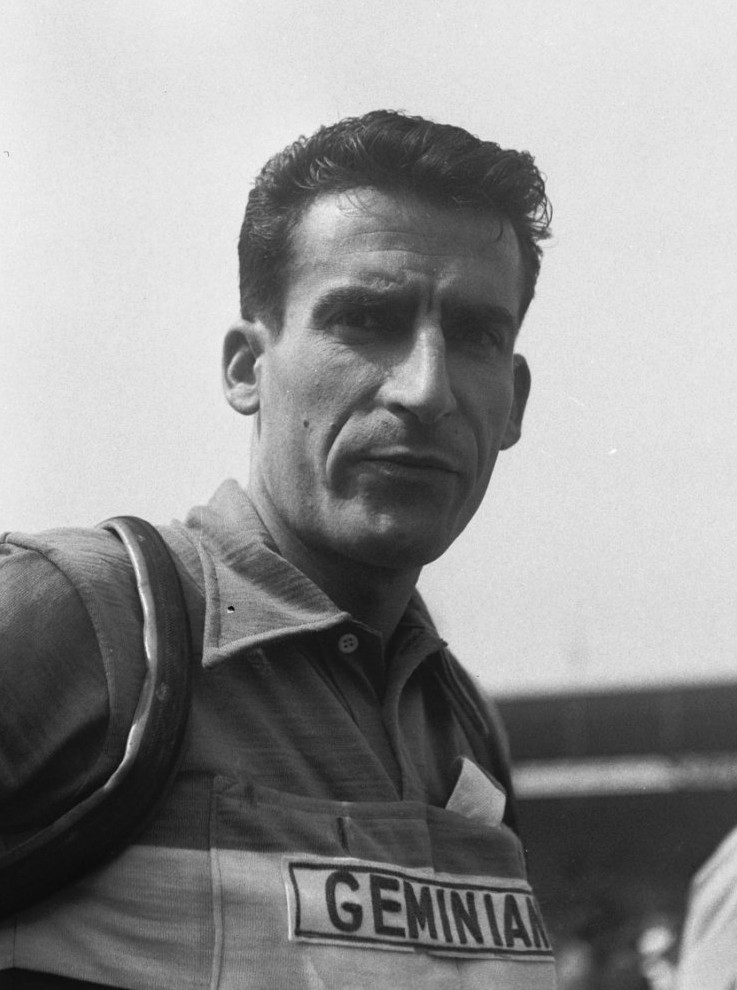
Raphaël Géminiani (pictured during the 1954 Tour de France) became Merckx's new team manager with Fiat France for the 1977 season

Fiat France became the new sponsor for Merckx's team and Raphaël Géminiani the new manager. He got his season's first victories in the Grand Prix d'Aix and Tour Méditerranéen. Merckx agreed to ride a light spring season in order to save himself for a chance at a sixth Tour victory. He took one stage at the Paris–Nice but had to withdraw from the race's final stage due to sinusitis. In the spring classics, Merckx did not win any races, with his best finish being a sixth place in the Liège–Bastogne–Liège. Before the Tour, Merckx raced both the Dauphiné Libéré and Tour de Suisse, winning one stage of the latter.

He admitted his poor form and anxiety about aggravating previous injuries going into the Tour de France. He held on to second place overall for two weeks. As the race entered the Alps, Merckx began to lose more time; he lost thirteen minutes on the stage to Alpe d'Huez alone. On the stage into Saint-Étienne, Merckx attacked and gained enough time to move into sixth overall; he finished the Tour in the same position. In the time following the Tour, Merckx raced twenty-two races in a span of forty days before coming in thirty-third at the UCI Road World Championships men's road race. Merckx earned his final victory on the road on 17 September in a kermis race. In late December, Fiat France chose to end their sponsorship of Merckx in favor of building a more French centered squad.

In January, the department store C&A announced that they would sponsor a new team for Merckx after their owner met Merckx at a football game. His plan for the season was to race one last Tour de France and then ride several smaller races for appearances. He raced a total of five races in the 1978 calendar. His last victory was in a track event, an omnium in Zürich, on 10 February 1978 with Patrick Sercu. His first road race came in the Grand Prix de Montauroux on 19 February. Merckx came to the front of the race and put in a large effort before swinging off and quitting the race. His best finish came in the Tour de Haut, where he managed fifth. He dropped out of Omloop Het Volk due to colitis and completed his final race on 19 March, a kermis in Kemzeke. Following the race, Merckx went on a vacation to go skiing. He returned from travel to train more, but by this point the team sponsor knew he was going to quit. Merckx announced his retirement from the sport on 18 May. He stated that the doctors advised him against racing.

== Retirement ==
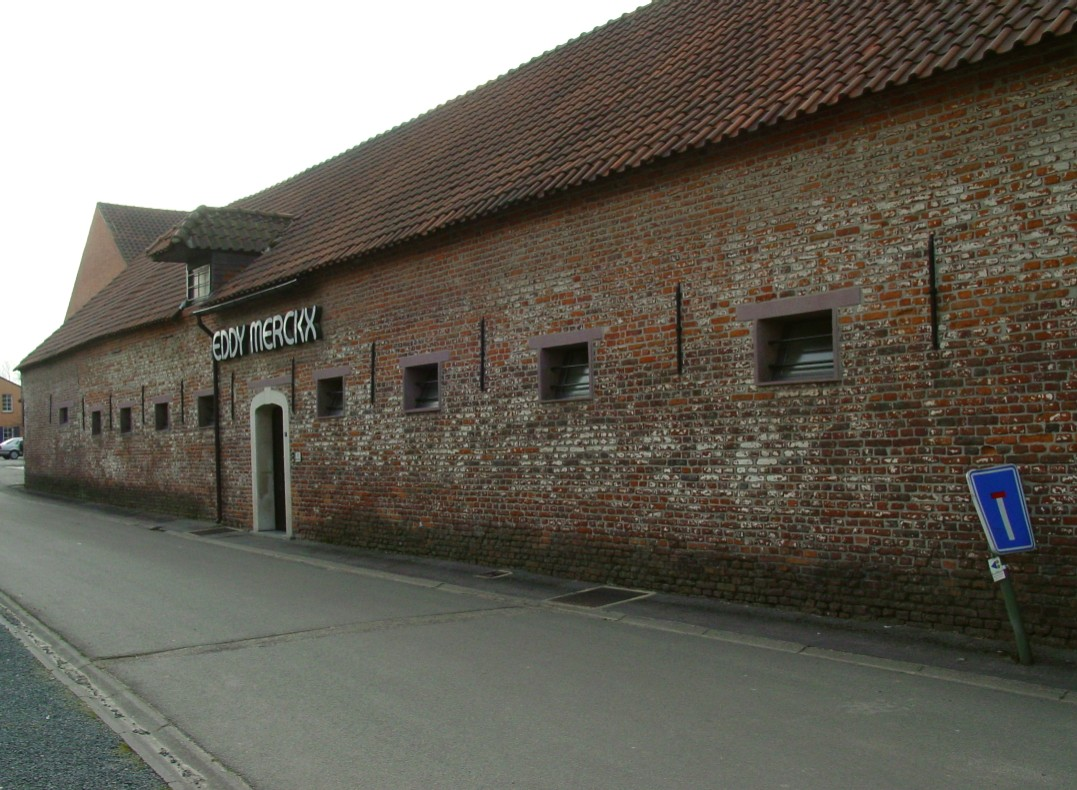
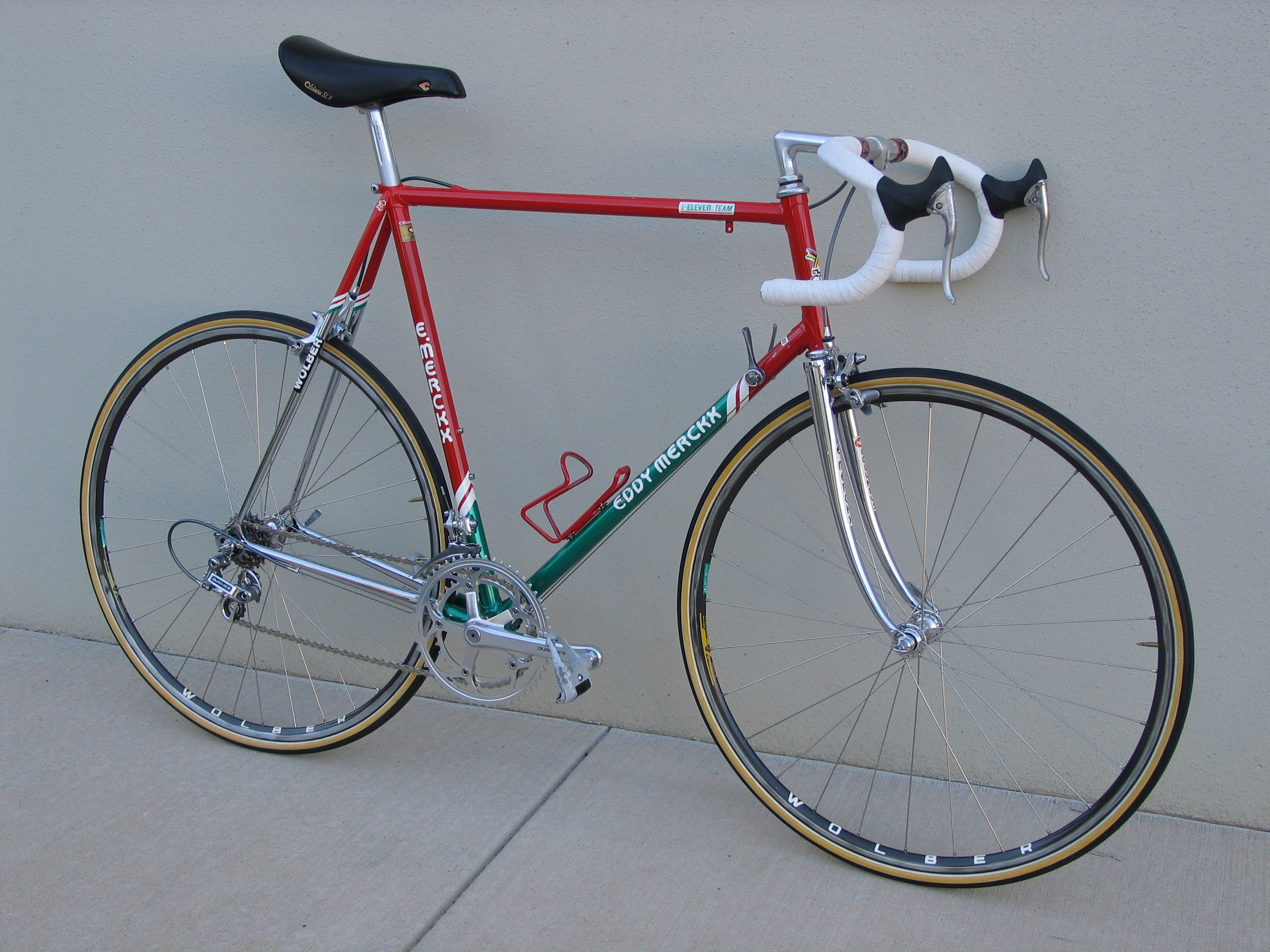
Eddy Merckx Cycles (factory pictured left) opened in 1980 and soon began producing bikes that were used by several professional cycling teams (a 1989 model used by 7-Eleven pictured right) in the last two decades of the 20th century

Following his exit from racing, Merckx opened up Eddy Merckx Cycles on 28 March 1980 in Brussels. The initial workers that were hired for the factory were trained by Ugo De Rosa, a notable bike maker, before starting. The company almost went bankrupt at one point and was also caught up in a tax repayment controversy. Merckx would spend time giving input on the models as they were being produced. Despite the financial problems the brand became highly regarded and successful, being used by several top-level cycling teams in the 1980s and 1990s. Merckx stepped down as CEO in 2008 and sold most of his shares, but continued to test the bikes that were created and had some input. Cycling journalist Sam Dansie believes that Eddy Merckx Cycles has maintained a presence as an elite bicycle due to its adoption of new methods over time. As of January 2015, the business is still based in Belgium and distributes to over twenty-five countries.

Merckx managed the Belgian national team world championships for eleven years, between 1986 and 1996. He acted as the race director for the Tour of Flanders for a brief period of time. He temporarily sponsored a youth developmental team with CGER Bank, a team that featured his son Axel. He helped organize the Grand Prix Eddy Merckx, which started out as an invitation only individual time trial event, later becoming a two-man time trial event. The event folded after 2004 due to riders' lack of interest.

He played a pivotal role in getting the Tour of Qatar started in 2002. In 2001 Hamad bin Khalifa Al Thani, the former Emir of Qatar, reached out to Merckx and told him of his interest in starting a bicycle race to show off his country. Merckx then contacted then Union Cycliste Internationale (UCI) president Hein Verbruggen, who checked out Qatar's roads. Following a successful inspection, Merckx contacted the Amaury Sport Organisation about working with him planning the race; they agreed in 2001. Merckx officially co-owned the race with Dirk De Pauw and helped organize it until the race was cancelled before the 2017 edition due to financial reasons. In addition, Merckx also helped Qatar secure the right to host the 2016 UCI Road World Championships, as well as designing the race route for the road race. Merckx briefly co-owned and helped start the Tour of Oman in 2010. In 2015, Merckx said later that although he was not racing, he knew would still be involved with the sport "as a bike builder, first in the factory and now as an ambassador." In November 2017, it was announced that Merckx and his partner Dirk De Pauw split with Tour of Oman organizer ASO following an undisclosed dispute.

== Personal life ==
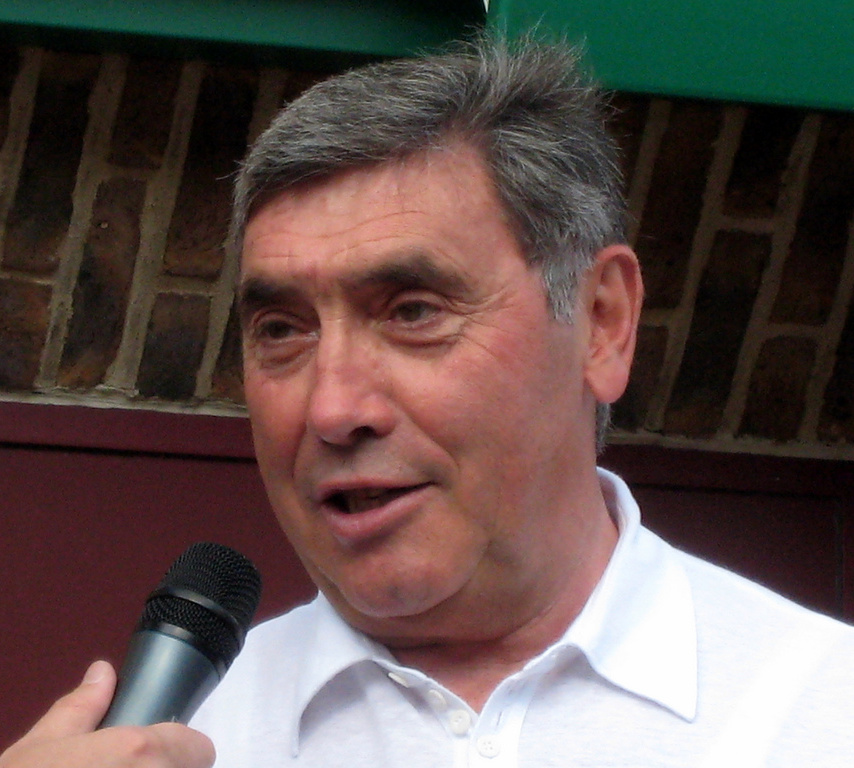
Baron Merckx during an interview in 2010

Merckx officially began dating Claudine Acou in April 1965. Acou was a 21-year-old teacher and daughter of the trainer of the national amateur team. Merckx asked her father for permission to marry her between track races. On 5 December 1967 Merckx married Acou after four years of courtship. She would often handle the press for her husband, who was shy. Acou gave birth to their first child, Sabrina, on 14 February 1970. Merckx skipped a team training camp to be with his wife for Sabrina's birth. Acou later gave birth to a son, Axel, who also became a professional cyclist. Merckx was brought up speaking Flemish, but was taught French in school.

In 1996, King Albert II of the Belgians gave him the title of baron. In Italy, Merckx was given the title of Cavaliere. In 2011, he was named Commandeur de la Légion d'honneur by then French President Nicolas Sarkozy in Paris, having been named Chevalier (Knight) of the order in January 1975. Merckx has become an ambassador for the Damien The Leper Society, a foundation named after a Catholic priest, which battles leprosy and other diseases in developing countries. He was blessed by Pope John Paul II in Brussels in the 1990s. Merckx is an art lover and stated that his favorite artist is René Magritte, a surrealist. Salvador Dalí is another of his favorites.

Before starting the third stage of the 1968 Giro d'Italia, Merckx was found to have a heart condition. A cardiologist, Giancarlo Lavezzaro, found that Merckx had non-obstructive hypertrophic cardiomyopathy, a disease that has killed several young athletes. In 2013, Merckx was given a pacemaker to help correct a heart rhythm issue. The surgery was performed in Genk on 21 March of that year as a preventative measure. Merckx stated that he never had any heart issues while racing, despite the fact that several men in his family died young of heart-related problems. In May 2004, he had an esophagus operation to cure stomach aches that had plagued him since he was young. In August, he reported that he lost nearly 30 kg after the procedure. On 13 October 2019, Merckx was hospitalised after a cycling accident, having suffered a haemorrhage and falling unconscious for a while. He was released a week later.

In December 2024, Baron Merckx crashed while on a group bike ride and fractured his hip. He underwent surgery at the same hospital as Remco Evenepoel did the previous week. As a result of the accident, Merckx required a full hip replacement.

== Legacy ==
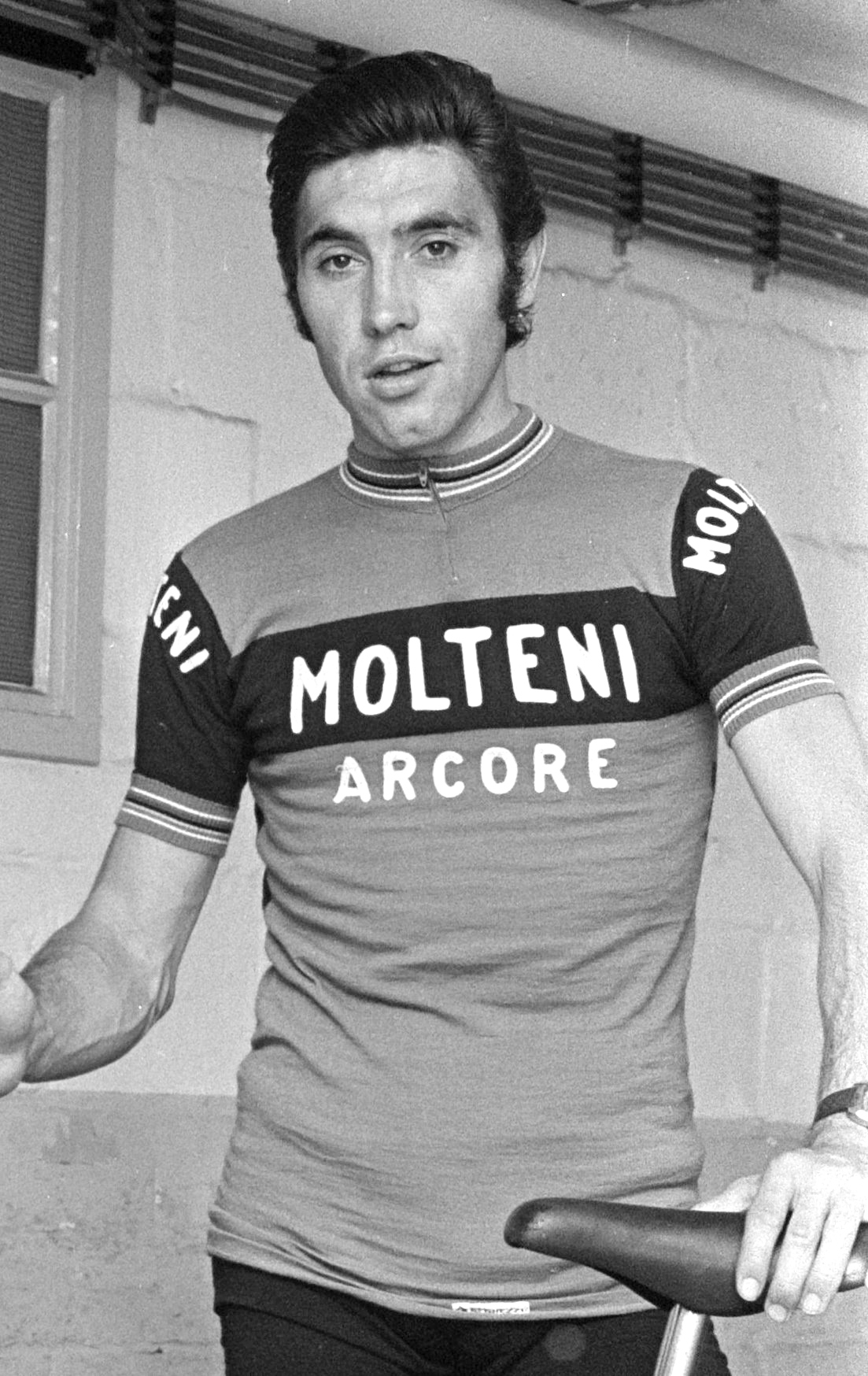
Merckx (pictured in August 1973) was a successful cyclist on the road and on the track, with a record of 525 victories to his credit over the course of his career

Baron Merckx has been regarded by many as the greatest and most successful cyclist of all time. He rode well in the Grand Tours and in the one-day classics. He was a very good time trialist and climber. In addition, Merckx showed great ability to race on the track. He was known for racing style that consisted of attacking constantly, which came to be known as la course en tête ("the race in the lead") for which the documentary on Merckx, "La Course en Tête" (which also has the double meaning of 'the race in your head') was named. (Note: This term was popularized by the eponymous film by Joel Santoni that documented Merckx's racing.) Attacking for Merckx was the best form of defence. He would spend a day in a breakaway and then make another significant attack the following day. Despite his constant attacking, he would occasionally ride in a defensive mindset, particularly when racing the Giro and facing Fuente. Merckx entered over 1,800 races during his career and won a total of 525. Due to his dominance in the sport some cycling historians refer to the period in which he raced as the "Merckx Era." During his professional career, he won 445 of the 1585 races he entered. Between the years of 1967 and 1977 Merckx raced between 111 and 151 races each season. In 1971, he raced 120 times and won 54 of the events, the most races any cyclist has won in a season. Merckx admits that he was the best of his generation, but insists it's not practical to compare across generations. Given the specialization of a cyclist's role in the modern peloton, Merckx's number of road race victories will most likely never be surpassed in the future.

Merckx is one of the three riders to win all five 'Monuments of Cycling' (i.e., Milan–San Remo, Tour of Flanders, Paris–Roubaix, Liège–Bastogne–Liège, and the Giro di Lombardia), the other two being Rik Van Looy and Roger De Vlaeminck. He finished his career with 19 victories across the monuments, more than any other rider and eight more than the rider with the second most. He won twenty-eight classic races, with Paris–Tours being the only race he did not win. The closest he came to victory in the race was sixth in the 1973 race. A lesser Belgian rider, Noël van Tyghem, won Paris–Tours in 1972 and said: "Between us, I and Eddy Merckx have won every classic that can be won. I won Paris–Tours, Merckx won all the rest."

One takes Merckx's legs, Merckx's head, Merckx's muscles, Merckx's heart and Merckx's drive for victory.

— Bernard Hinault when asked to describe the "ideal cyclist"

While racing, he became the third rider to win all three Grand Tours in his career, a feat that has since been accomplished by more riders. He holds the record for most Grand Tour victories with 11, along with the record for most stage wins across all three Grand Tours with 64. He has completed the most Giro-Tour doubles in history with three. He was the first rider to win cycling's Triple Crown which has only been accomplished two other times, by Stephen Roche in 1987 and Tadej Pogačar in 2024. He is the only rider to win the general, points and mountains classifications at the Giro d'Italia, in 1968, and at the Tour de France, in 1969. Since then, the general, points and mountains classifications have been won at the Vuelta a España by Tony Rominger in 1993 and by Laurent Jalabert in 1995. He shares the record for most victories at both the Giro d'Italia and Tour de France, with five wins at each. In those races he also holds the records for days spent in the race leader's jersey at 78 and 96 respectively. For his career successes in the Giro d'Italia, Merckx became the first rider inducted into the race's Hall of Fame in 2012. When being inducted, Merckx was given the modern-day trophy with the winners engraved until 1974, the last year he won the race. At the Tour, he sits just behind Mark Cavendish for the record of the most stage wins in a career, Merckx's thirty-four to Cavendish's thirty-five. The Grand Départ for the 2019 Tour de France was held in Brussels, Belgium to honor Merckx's first Tour de France win in 1969.

He was given the nickname "The Cannibal" by the daughter of Christian Raymond, a teammate of Merckx's. Raymond had commented on Merckx not allowing anyone else to win, to which his daughter referred to Merckx as a cannibal. Raymond liked the nickname and then mentioned it to the press. In Italy, he was known as il mostro ("the Monster").

Dutch cyclist Joop Zoetemelk said "First there was Merckx, and then another classification began behind him." Cycling journalist and commentator Phil Liggett wrote that if Merckx started a race, many riders acknowledged that they likely would be competing for second place. Ted Costantino wrote that Merckx was undoubtedly the number one cyclist of all time, whereas in other sports there are debates that go on about who is actually the greatest of all time. Gianni Motta told of how Merckx would ride without a racing cape when it was snowing or raining in order to go faster than other riders. Even after his retirement, many subsequent stars still feel overshadowed by his fame and race results. Merckx befriended Fiorenzo Magni when he began racing for an Italian team. He was criticized by opposing riders for his relentless pursuit of victory that prevented even lesser known riders from collecting a few victories. When told that he won too much, Merckx stated that "The day when I start a race without intending to win it, I won't be able to look at myself in the mirror."

=== Records overview ===
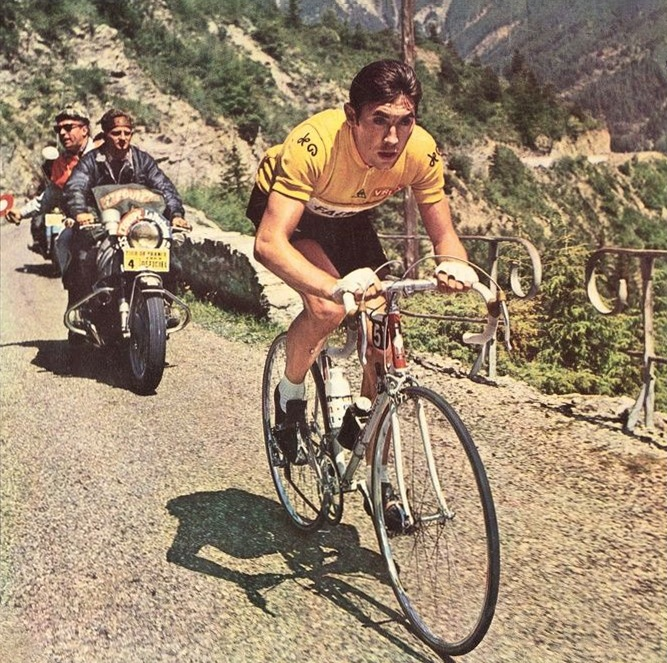
Merckx, pictured during the 1970 Tour de France, has ridden the most days wearing the yellow jersey

==== Grand Tours ====
- Most Grand Tour wins: 11
- Most consecutive Grand Tours wins: 4 in 1972 Giro d'Italia, 1972 Tour de France, 1973 Vuelta a España & 1973 Giro d'Italia
- Most Grand Tour stage wins: 64
- Most Tour de France wins: 5 in 1969, 1970, 1971, 1972 & 1974 (record shared with Jacques Anquetil, Bernard Hinault, Miguel Induráin and Tadej Pogačar.)
- Most stage wins in 1 Tour de France: 8 in 1970 (record shared with Charles Pélissier and Freddy Maertens)
- Most days in Tour de France yellow jersey: 96
- First winner of all 3 specialties in 1 Tour de France (mountain, sprint, and individual time trial) in 1974
- The only general, points and mountains classification winner in the Tour de France: 1969
- Most Tour de France combativity awards: 4 in 1969, 1970, 1974 & 1975
- Most Giro d'Italia wins: 5 in 1968, 1970, 1972, 1973 & 1974 (record shared with Alfredo Binda and Fausto Coppi)
- Most days in Giro d'Italia pink jersey: 78
- The only general, points and mountains classification winner in the Giro d'Italia: 1968

==== Classic races ====
- Winner of all 5 Monuments of Cycling (record shared with Rik Van Looy and Roger De Vlaeminck)
- Most victories in all Monuments: 19
- Winner of 3 Monuments in 1 year: 1969, 1971, 1972 & 1975 (record shared with Tadej Pogacar: 2025, 2026)
- The only cyclist to win all 5 Monuments more than once
- Most victories in classic races: 28
- Most victories in a single classic: 7 in Milan–San Remo 1966, 1967, 1969, 1971, 1972, 1975 & 1976
- Most Liège–Bastogne–Liège wins: 5 in 1969, 1971, 1972, 1973 & 1975
- Most Gent–Wevelgem wins: 3 in 1967, 1970 & 1973 (shared record)

==== Other ====
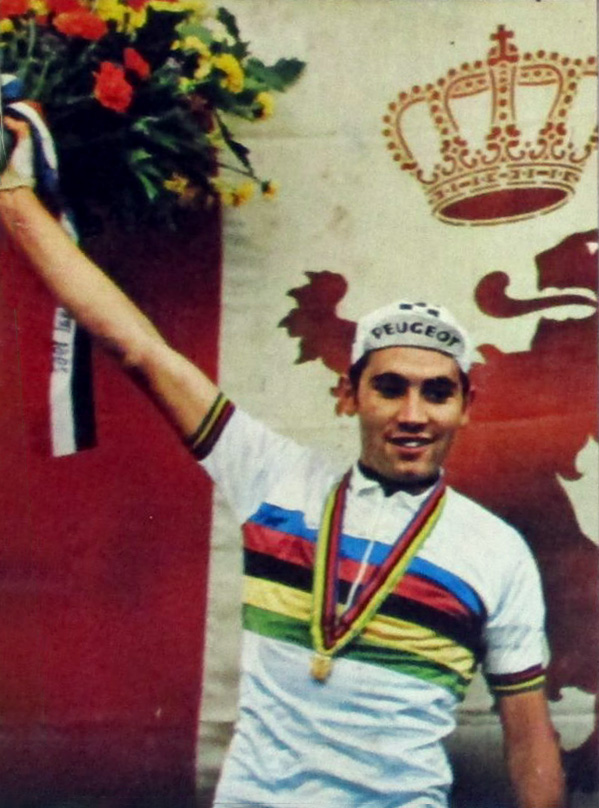
Eddy Merckx in rainbow jersey, celebrating his first world title in 1967

- Most road races won by a professional cyclist: 525
- Most road races won in 1 season: 54 (of 120 entries) in 1971
- UCI World hour record: 1972
- Most UCI World Road Championships: 3 in 1967, 1971 & 1974 (record shared with Alfredo Binda, Rik Van Steenbergen, Óscar Freire and Peter Sagan)
- Triple Crown of Cycling winner: 1974 (record shared with Stephen Roche and Tadej Pogačar)
- Monument winner, Grand Tour winner and UCI World Champion in 1 year: 1971 (record shared with Alfredo Binda, Bernard Hinault, Tadej Pogačar and Remco Evenepoel)
- Most Super Prestige Pernod wins: 7 in 1969, 1970, 1971, 1972, 1973, 1974 & 1975
- Most Escalada a Montjuïc wins: 6 in 1966, 1970, 1971, 1972, 1974 & 1975
- Most Giro di Sardegna wins: 4 in 1968, 1971, 1973 & 1975
- Most Setmana Catalana de Ciclisme wins: 2 in 1975 and 1976 (shared record)

===== World hour record =====
Discipline	Record	Date	Event	Velodrome	Ref
Hour record	49.431 km	25 October 1972	—	Agustín Melgar Olympic Velodrome, Mexico City	

== Doping ==
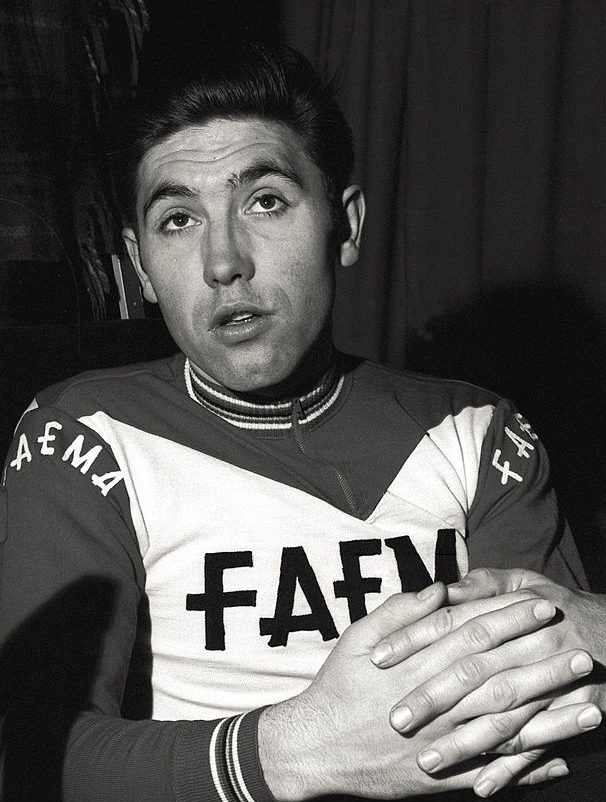
Merckx (pictured during the 1969 Six Days of Milan) was involved in three separate doping incidents during his career

Merckx was leading the 1969 Giro d'Italia after the sixteenth stage in Savona. After the stage, he went to the mobile lab that travelled with the race and conducted drug tests. (Note: At the 1969 Giro d'Italia the top two in the general classification were drug tested after each stage, along with two other cyclists chosen at random.) His first test was positive for fencamfamine, an amphetamine, and a second test was also positive. The results of the test were announced to the press before Merckx and his team were informed. The positive test meant Merckx was to be suspended for a month. Race director Vincenzo Torriani delayed the start of the seventeenth stage in an attempt to persuade the president of the Italian Cycling Federation to allow Merckx to begin the stage. However, the president was not in his office and Torriani was forced to start the stage, disqualifying Merckx in the process. In the following days, the UCI removed the suspension.

From the start, Merckx claimed his innocence saying that "I am a clean rider, I do not need to take anything to win." He had previously tested negative eight times during the race. The majority of the international press believed in his innocence, stating that with his lead, it was illogical that he would use banned substances on an easy stage, with a doping test certain to follow if he was still the leader. He argued that his samples had been mishandled. After the incident, several conspiracy theories emerged, including that the urine that tested positive was not Merckx's, and that he had been given a water bottle with the stimulant in it—ostensibly all moves to give Italian Felice Gimondi a better chance at victory.

On 8 November 1973, it was announced that Merckx had tested positive for norephedrine after winning the Giro di Lombardia a month earlier. Upon learning of the first test being positive in later October, he had a counter-analysis performed which was also positive. The drug was present in a cough medicine that the Molteni doctor, Dr. Cavalli, prescribed to him. Merckx was disqualified from the race and the victory was awarded to second-place finisher Gimondi. In addition, Merckx was given a month's suspension and fined 150,000 lira. He admitted his fault in taking the medicine but said that the name norephedrine was not on the bottle of cough syrup he used. Norephedrine was later removed from the WADA-list of banned substances.

On 8 May 1977, Merckx, along with several other riders, tested positive for the stimulant pemoline at La Flèche Wallonne. The group of riders was charged by the Belgian cycling federation, and were each given a 24,000 pesetas fine and a one-month suspension. Initially, Merckx announced his intention to appeal the penalty, saying he only took substances that were not on the banned list. His eighth-place finish in the race was voided. Years later, Merckx said he did take a banned substance, citing that he was wrong to have trusted a doctor.

Due to Merckx's positive tests during his career, he was one of several riders asked by the event organizers to stay away from the 2007 UCI Road World Championships in Stuttgart, Germany. The organizers stated that "[they] had to be role models", while Merckx wrote them off, claiming they were crazy.

== Honours and awards ==
=== Titles of honour ===
- Knight of the French Legion of Honour: 1975
- Officer in the Belgian Order of Leopold II: 1996
- Commander of the French Legion of Honour: 2014
- Knight in the Order of Merit of the Italian Republic
- Silver Olympic Order: 1995
- Created Baron Merckx by Royal Decree, with devise Post Proelia Praemia: 1996
- Honorary doctorate of the university VUB: 2011
- Belgian Olympic and Interfederal Committee Order of Merit: 2013
- Merckx is honorary citizen of Meise, Tielt-Winge and Tervuren
- Bronze Zinneke: 2006

=== Sport awards and honours ===
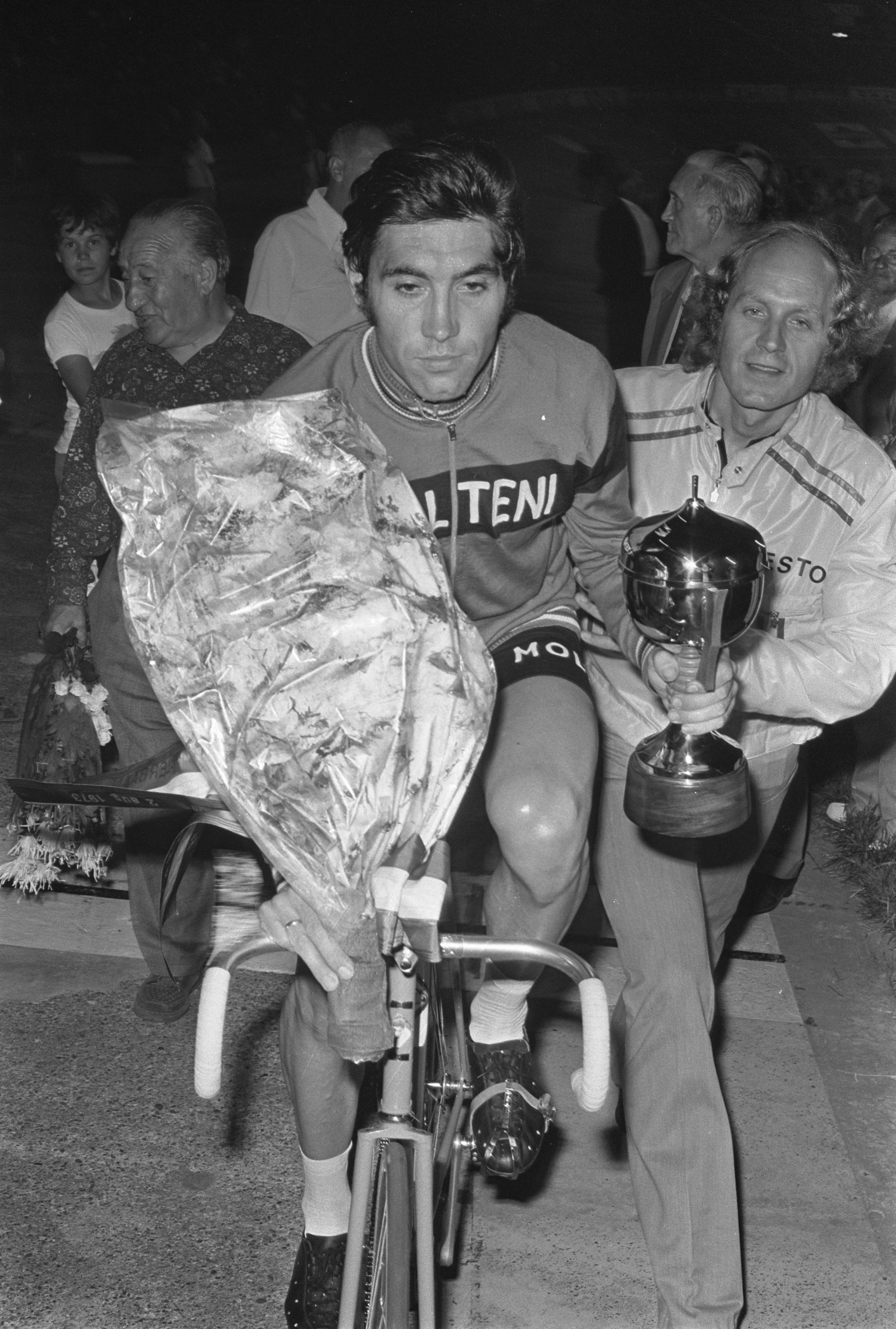
In 2000, the UCI named Merckx (pictured in 1973) Cyclist of the 20th Century

- Belgian National Sports Merit Award: 1967
- Belgian Sportsman of the Year: 1969, 1970, 1971, 1972, 1973, 1974
- Tour de France Overall Combativity award: 1969, 1970, 1974, 1975
- Tour de France Stage Combativity award (14): 4 in 1975; 3 in 1970; 2 in 1969, 1974 & 1977; 1 in 1971
- PAP European Sportsperson of the Year: 1969, 1970
- Worldwide Sportsman of the Year: 1969, 1971, 1974
- Grand Prix de l'Académie des Sports: 1969
- Mendrisio d'Or: 1972, 2011
- Gan Challenge}: 1973, 1974, 1975
- Swiss AIOCC Trophy: 1980, 2021
- Procyclingstats.com – All Time Wins Ranking (1st place, 276 wins)
- Belgian Sportsman of the 20th Century: 1999
- Reuters Worldwide Sports Personality of the Century (7th place): 1999
- Reuters General Sportsman of the Century (2nd place): 1999
- UCI Cyclist of the 20th Century: 2000
- Marca Legend: 2000
- Vincenzo Torriani Award: 2001
- Introduced in the UCI Hall of Fame: 2002
- UCI Top 100 of All Time: (1st place, 24 510 points)
- Memoire du Cyclisme – Ranking of the Greatest Cyclists (1st place): 2002
- Bleacher Report – The 30 Most Dominant Athletes of All Time (20th): 2010
- Bleacher Report – Tour de France All-Time Top 25 Riders (1st place): 2011
- Italian Sport and Civilization Award: 2011
- First Member Giro Hall of Fame: 2012
- Topito – Top 15 Greatest Cyclists Ever (1st place): 2012
- L'Équipe Trophée Champion des Champions de Légende: 2014
- Rouleur Hall of Fame: 2018
- Velonews The Greatest Cyclists of All Time (1st place): 2019
- Wiggle The Best Cyclists Ever Rank (1st place): 2020
- Eurosport Greatest General Classification Cyclist of all Time: 2020
- CyclingRanking – Overall Ranking (1st place): 2022
- Vélo d'Or honorary award: 2023
- ESPN Lifetime Achievement Award: 2025

=== Places and statues ===
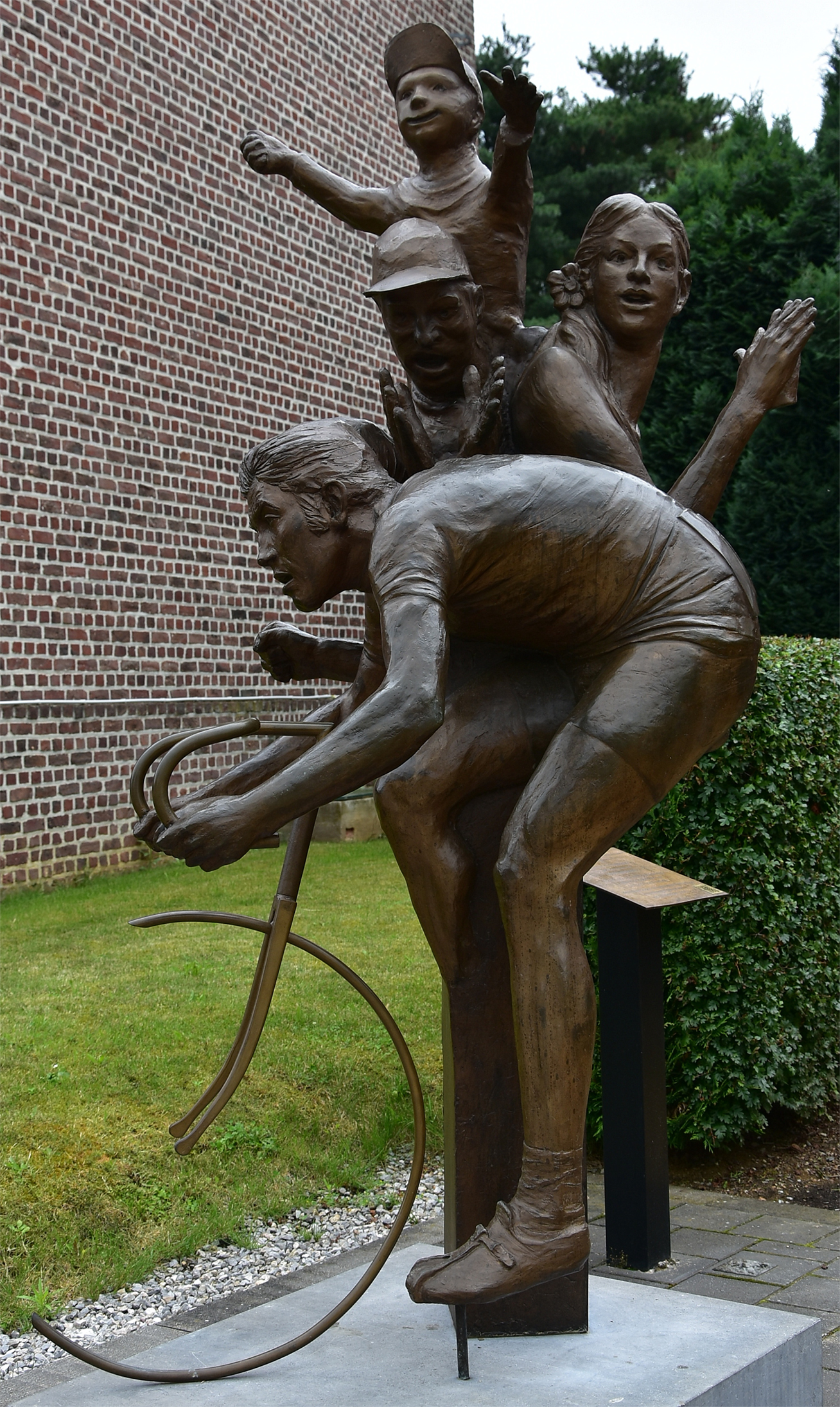
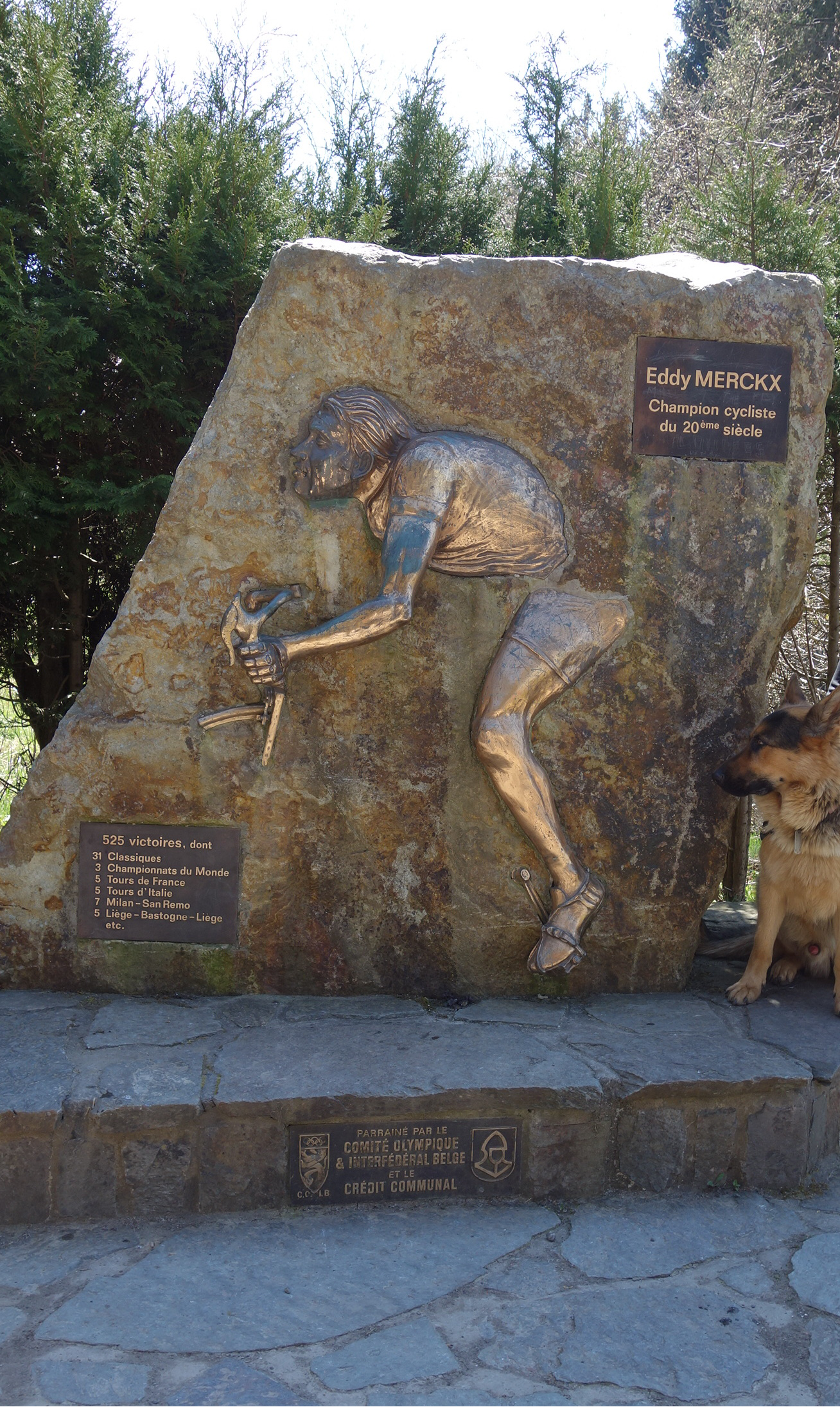
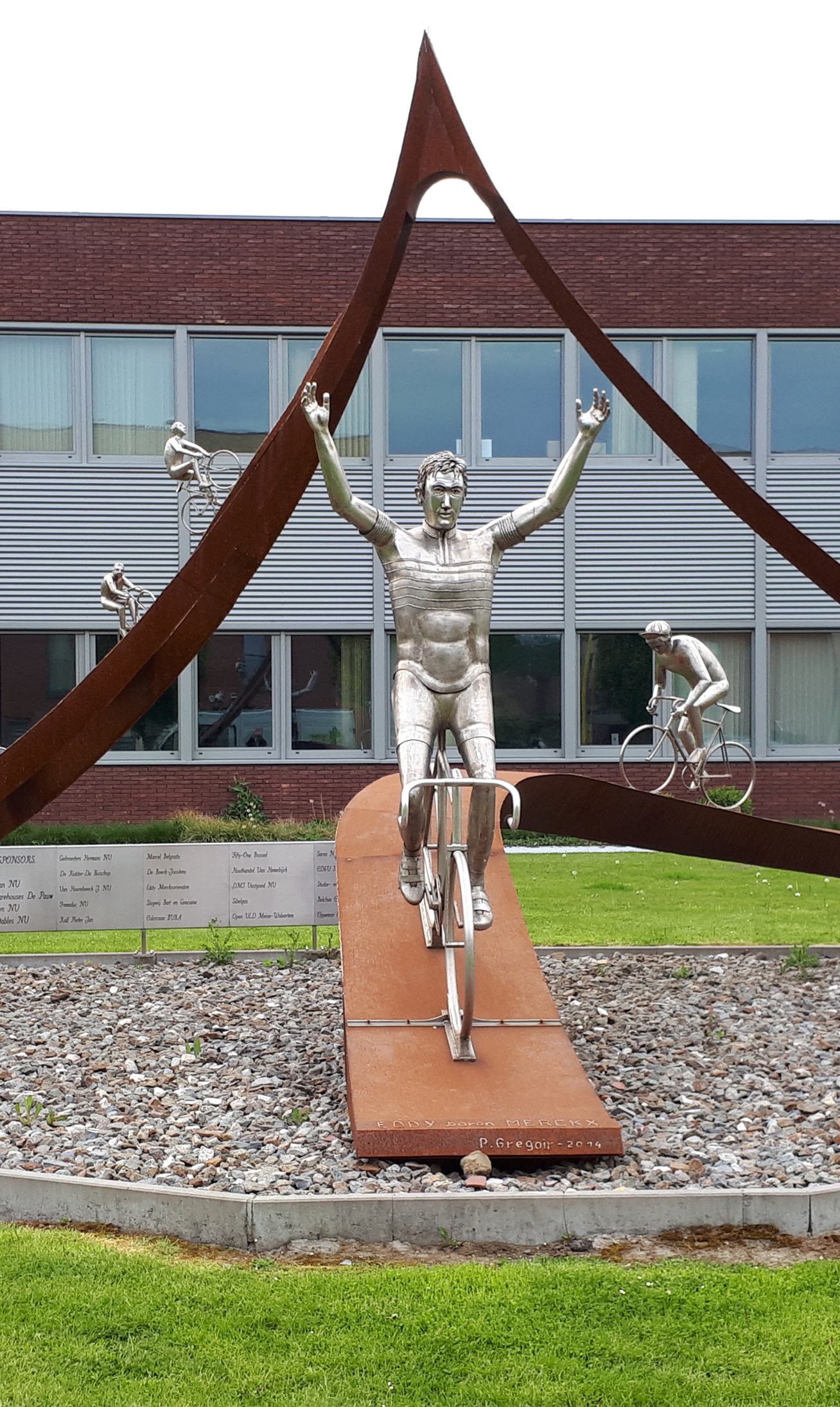
Statue of Eddy, Baron Merckx, in Meensel-Kiezegem and monuments in Stavelot and Meise
- Monument in Stavelot: 1993
- Vélodrome Eddy Merckx, Mourenx: 1999
- Eddy Merckx metro station, Brussels: 2003
- Sports complex, Vlaams Wielercentrum Eddy Merckx, Gent: 2006
- Monument in Meise: 2015
- Statue in Meensel-Kiezegem: 2015
- Square Eddy Merckx in Sint-Pieters-Woluwe: 2019
- Monument in Petit-Enghien: 2023

=== Events and awards ===
- Golden Bike Eddy Merckx: a cycle race for novices from 1983 to 2008
- Grand Prix Eddy Merckx: a professional cycle race from 1980 to 2004
- Chiba Alpencup Eddy Merckx Classics
- Start of the 2019 Tour de France in Brussels in honour of Eddy Merckx
- From 2023, the Vélo d'Or "Eddy Merckx trophy" is awarded for the best classics cyclist

== In popular culture ==
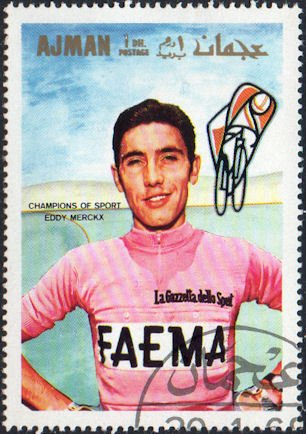
Merckx on a 1969 Stamp of Ajman

=== Music ===
- The single Vas-Y Eddy (1967) by Jean Saint-Paul is notable for being the first recorded song about Merckx.
- Eddy Prend Le Maillot Jaune, a song by Pierre-André Gil was released after his first Tour de France victory.
- The single Bravo Eddy! by Jean Narcy was released in 1970.
- Eddy Est Imbattable! by Pierre-André Gil was released in 1971.
- Merckx is mentioned in the 1974 song Paris-New York, New York-Paris by Jacques Higelin.
- Eddy Merckx is a song by the Belgian band Sttellla on the album Il faut tourner l'Apache in 1998.

=== Films and series ===
- A 1973 Danish short film was made, Eddy Merckx in the Vicinity of a Cup of Coffee, starring Merckx and Walter Godefroot.
- In the 1973 comedy film The Mad Adventures of Rabbi Jacob, Merckx was cited by Louis de Funès as the author of Che Guevara's famous quote: "The revolution is like a bicycle: when it doesn't move forward, it falls".
- The 1974 documentary film La Course en Tête by Joël Santoni looks at the racing and private life of Merckx.
- Jørgen Leth's 1974 film The Stars and the Watercarriers highlights Merckx performance in the 1973 Giro d'Italia and the often-overlooked domestiques who support the star cyclist.
- The 1976 Danish documentary film A Sunday in Hell focuses on the contenders Merckx, Roger De Vlaeminck, Freddy Maertens, and Francesco Moser in the Paris–Roubaix race of that year.
- The 1978 RTBF documentary Au Temps d'Eddy looks back at the career of Merckx.
- Merckx has a cameo in the 1985 sports drama film American Flyers, starring Kevin Costner.
- Merckx is the rival – more or less fantasized – of Benoît Poelvoorde in the 2001 film Le Vélo de Ghislain Lambert by Philippe Harel.
- In 2005, he appears in episode 39b of the second season of Space Goofs, where his character provides the Earth's core with energy, pedalling a stationary bike.
- Merckx has a cameo in the 2012 French-Belgian comedy film Torpedo by Matthieu Donck.
- The Flemish movie, set in the seventies Allez, Eddy was released in 2012.
- In the documentary The King of Mont Ventoux (2012), Merckx rides a virtual race against other former stage winners Jean François Bernard, Marco Pantani, Richard Virenque and Juan Manuel Gárate.
- Eddy Merckx is the subject of an autobiographical fiction written by Christophe Van Staen, entitled Eddy Merckx, Nobel Prize? (Lamiroy, 2019)
- The documentary 1969 - Following Merckx (2022) attempts to recreate Merckx's legendary solo breakaway during Stage 17 of the 1969 Tour de France, providing insights into his strategic strength and determination.
- Merckx, a documentary film with rare archive footage and interview fragments, was released in January 2025.
- 525: The Unstoppable Eddy Merckx, the "official film about the world’s greatest ever cyclist", produced by the English Rapha Films, premiered in Regent Street Cinema in London on 30 July 2026.

=== Comic books ===
- Les Fabuleux Exploits d'Eddy Merckx, a celebrity comic, was released in 1973. It was translated in different languages.
- Eddy Merckx appears in the comic strip San-Antonio Fait un Tour published by Fleuve Noir in 1973.
- He appears as a speedy messenger in the comic book Asterix in Belgium of the Asterix series by René Goscinny and Albert Uderzo, published in 1979.
- A tribute to Eddy Merckx is paid in the 1987 Boule et Bill album nr. 24, Billets de Bill.
- Merckx also appears in album 79 (1988) of the Robert en Bertrand series and album 247 (1996) of the Spike and Suzy series.
- Another tribute is paid in one of the adventures of Donald Duck, who must compete against the champion of his uncle's rival: "Dydy Berkxz".

== Books on Merckx ==
=== In English ===
- The Champion Eddy Merckx by Claude le Boul in 1987, Ludion, 71 p. (Collected paintings; English, Dutch, French)
- Eddy Merckx: The Greatest Cyclist of the 20th Century by Rik Vanwalleghem and Steven Hawkins in 1996, VeloPress, 216 p. (English) ISBN 9781884737725
- Thorne, Brian; Lambers, Elke (1998). Person-Centred Therapy: A European Perspective. SAGE. ISBN 978-0-7619-5155-1.
- Liggett, Phil; Raia, James; Lewis, Sammarye (27 May 2005). Tour de France For Dummies. John Wiley & Sons. ISBN 978-0-7645-8449-7.
- Foot, John (3 May 2011). Pedalare! Pedalare!. A&C Black. ISBN 978-1-4088-1755-1.
- Heijmans, Jeroen; Mallon, Bill (9 September 2011). Historical Dictionary of Cycling. Scarecrow Press. ISBN 978-0-8108-7369-8.
- Friebe, Daniel (2012). Eddy Merckx: The Cannibal. Ebury Press. ISBN 978-0-09-194314-1.
- Eddy Merckx 525 by Frederik Backelandt & Karl Vannieuwkerke in 2012, Kannibaal, 224 p. (English, Dutch) ISBN 9781934030899
- Nauright, John; Parrish, Charles (2012). Sports Around the World: History, Culture, and Practice. ABC-CLIO. ISBN 978-1-59884-300-2.
- Fotheringham, William (2012). Merckx: Half Man, Half Bike. Yellow Jersey Press. ISBN 978-0-224-09195-4.
- Fotheringham, William (1 April 2013). Half Man, Half Bike: The Life of Eddy Merckx, Cycling's Greatest Champion. Chicago Review Press. ISBN 978-1-61374-729-2.
- Moore, Richard; Benson, Daniel (2013). The racing bicycle : design, function, speed. Foreword by Robert Penn. New York: Universe. ISBN 9780789324658.
- Merckx 69: Celebrating the World's Greatest Cyclist in his Finest Year by Tonny Strouken and Jan Maes in 2015, Bloomsbury Publishing 180 p. (English, Dutch, French) ISBN 9781472910646
- The Dream of Eddy Merckx by Freddy Merckx in 2019, Sportliteratuur Uitgeverij, 56 p. (English, Dutch, French) ISBN 9781513646121
- De Rivals of Merckx by Filip Osselaer in 2019, Borgerhoff & Lamberigts, 208 p. (English, Dutch, French) ISBN 9789089319852
- 1969 – The Year of Eddy Merckx by Johny Vansevenant in 2019, Lannoo, 432 p. (English, Dutch, French) ISBN 9789401462860
- Eddy Merckx: Biography Story for Kids by Willie M. Mone in 2024, Independently Published, 80 p. (English) ISBN 9798342094214
- Eddy Merckx Biography: The Cannibal's Unstoppable Ride by W Alvin M. James in 2024, 71 p. (English) ISBN 9798341493360

=== In other languages ===
- Eddy Merckx by Louis Clicteur & Lucien Berghmans in 1967, 164 p. (Dutch)
- Mijn Wegjournaal by Louis Clicteur in 1971, 176 p. (Dutch)
- En Toen Kwam Eddy Merckx by Jan Cornand & André Blancke in 1975, 216 p. (Dutch)
- En Toen Ging Eddy Merckx by Jan Cornand in 1978, 110 p. (Dutch)
- Eddy Merckx Story by Jan Cornand in 1978, 111 p. (Dutch)
- Toen Merckx er Nog Was André Blancke in 1979, 111 p. (Dutch)
- Eddy Merckx – Mijn Levensverhaal by Robert Janssens in 1989, 208 p. (Dutch) ISBN 9789028914650
- Eddy Merckx – De Mens achter de Kannibaal by Rik Vanwalleghem in 1993, 216 p. (Dutch, French) ISBN 9789073322059
- Spraakmakende biografie van Eddy Merckx by Philippe Brunel in 2005, 192 p. (Dutch)
- De Mannen achter Merckx : het Verhaal van Faema en Molteni by Patrick Cornillie and Johny Vansevenant in 2006, 304 p. (Dutch, French) ISBN 90-77562-28-1
- Fietspassie/La Passion du Vélo by Toon Claes and Eddy Merckx in 2008, 196 p. (Dutch, French) ISBN 9789086792047
- De Zomer van '69, hoe Merckx won van Armstrong by Patrick Cornillie in 2009, 343 p. (Dutch) ISBN 9789086792023
- Merckxissimo by Karl Vannieuwkerke & Stephan Vanfleteren in 2009, 144 p. (Dutch, French) ISBN 978 90 8138 940 2
- Eddy Merckx en Ik – Herinneringen aan de Kannibaal by Stefaan Van Laere in 2010, 184 p. (Dutch)
- Eddy Merckx – Getuigenissen van Jan Wauters by Jan Wauters in 2010, 176 p. (Dutch) ISBN 9789089311450
- Mannen tegen Merckx – van Van Looy tot Maertens by Johny Vansevenant in 2012 (Dutch) ISBN 9789491376214
- Eddy Merckx – Een leven by Daniel Friebe in 2013, 272 p. (Dutch) ISBN 9789401404471
- Eddy Merckx – De biografie by Johny Vansevenant in 2015, 400 p. (Dutch, French) ISBN 9789492081513
- Eddy! Eddy! Eddy! De Tour in België by Geert de Vriese in 2019, 256 p. (Dutch) ISBN 9789089247308
- 50 jaar Merckx – Jubileum van een Tourlegende by Tonny Strouken in 2020, 140 p. (Dutch, French) ISBN 9789059247314
- Merckx 80 by Guy Roger & Robert Janssens in 2025, 264 p. (Dutch) ISBN 9789493410046
- De Ultieme Biografie - Ik Wilde Altijd Winnen by Johny Vansevenant in 2025, 432 p. (Dutch) ISBN 9789020975451
- Maestro Merckx by Stefaan van Laere and Robert Janssens in 2025, 174 p. (Dutch, French) ISBN 9789493453128
- L'Irrésistible Ascension d'un Jeune Champion by Pierre Thonon in 1968, 170 p. (French)
- Merckx ou la Rage de Vaincre by Léon Zitrone in 1969, 208 p. (French) ASIN B0061R9A8O
- Qui êtes-vous Eddy Merckx? by Marc Jeuniau in 1969, 112 p. (French) ASIN B008AWK3MK
- Du Maillot Arc en Ciel au Maillot Jaune by Pierre Thonon in 1970, 167 p. (French)
- Le Phénomène Eddy Merckx et ses Rivaux by François Terbeen in 1971, 185 p. (French) ASIN B003WRURD8
- Face à Face avec Eddy Merckx by Marc Jeuniau in 1971, 111 p. (French)
- Mes Carnets de Route en 1971 by Marc Jeuniau in 1971, 159 p. (French)
- Plus d'un Tour dans Mon Sac: Mes Carnets de Route 1972 by Marc Jeuniau in 1972, 158 p. (French)
- Eddy Merckx cet Inconnu by Roger Bastide in 1972, 124 p. (French)
- Les Exploits Fabuleux d'Eddy Merckx by Yves Duval and Christian Lippens in 1973, 48 p. (Comic book in French)
- Mes 50 Victoires en 1973: Mes carnets de route 1973 by René Jacobs in 1973, 159 p. (French)
- Merckx / Ocana : Duel au Sommet by François Terbeen in 1974, 217 p. (French)
- Coureur Cycliste: Un Homme et son Métier by Eddy Merckx and Pierre Chany in 1974, 248 p. (French) ISBN 9782221231975
- Ma Chasse aux Maillots Rose, Jaune, Arc-en-Ciel: Mes Carnets de route 1974 by Eddy Merckx, Marc Jeuniau, Pierre Depré in 1974, 158 p. (French) ASIN B0014MKH4C
- Le Livre d'Or de Eddy Merckx by Georges Pagnoud in 1976, 111 p. (French) ISBN 978-2263000218
- Eddy Merckx l'Homme du Défi by Marc Jeuniau in 1977, 220 p. (French) ISBN 2801600911
- La Roue de la Fortune, du Champion à l'Homme d'Affaires by Joël Godaert in 1989, 208 p. (French) ISBN 2 7130 1006 3
- Eddy Merckx, l'Épopée by Théo Mathy in 1999, 159 p. (French) ISBN 9782507000455
- Merckx Intime by Philippe Brunel in 2002, 159 p. (French) ISBN 9782702132289
- Eddy Merckx, Ma Véritable Histoire by Stéphane Thirion in 2006, 200 p. (French) ISBN 9782930359595
- Eddy Merckx, les Tours de France d'un Champion Unique by Théo Mathy in 2008, 200 p. (French) ISBN 9782507000455
- Tour 75 : Le Rêve du Cannibale by Laurent Watiez in 2010, 103 p. (French) ISBN 9782916655208
- Dans l'Ombre d'Eddy Merckx – Les Hommes qui ont Couru contre le Cannibale by Johny Vansevenant in 2012, 384 p. (French) ISBN 9782507050849
- Cazeneuve, Thierry; Chany, Pierre (2011). La fabuleuse histoire du Tour de France [The Story of the Tour de France] (in French) (Nouv. éd. ed.). Paris: La Martinière. ISBN 9782732447926.
- Coup de Foudre dans l'Aubisque: Eddy Merckx dans la Légende by Bertrand Lucq in 2015, 136 p. (French) ISBN 2758800454
- Eddy : Ma Saison des Classiques en Version 1973 by François Paoletti in 2015, 212 p. (French) ISBN 9782940585038
- Eddy Merckx, c’est Beaucoup plus qu’Eddy Merckx by Christophe Penot in 2015, 48 p. (French) ISBN 9782844211262
- Sur les Traces d'Eddy Merckx by Jean-Louis Lahaye and ean-Louis Lahaye in 2016, 250 p. (French) ISBN 9782507053420
- La Fabuleuse Carrière d'Eddy Merckx en un Survol by Michel Crepel in 2016, 202 p. (French) ISBN 9782334149334
- Eddy Été 69 by Jean-Paul Vespini in 2019, 191 p. (French) ISBN 9782970132912
- On m'Appelait le Cannibale by Stéphane Thirion in 2019, 255 p. (French) ISBN 9782875573919
- Eddy Merckx : Analyse d'une Légende by Jean Cléder in 2019, 224 p. (French) ISBN 9782372541183
- Merckx-Ocana: Le Bel Ete 1971 by Pascal Sergent in 2021, 153 p. (French) ISBN 9782490997046
- Inaccessible Merckx by Guy Roger in 2024, 279 p. (French, German, Spanish) ISBN 9782263187971
- E non Chiamatemi (più) Cannibale. Vita e Imprese di Eddy Merckx by Angelo De Lorenzi in 2003, 153 p. (Italian) ISBN 9788888551210
- Il Sessantotto a Pedali. Al Giro con Eddy Merckx by Francesco Ricci in 2008, 151 p. (Italian) ISBN 9788860410825
- Fausto Coppi Eddy Merckx. Due campionissimi a confronto by Luciano Boccaccini in 2011, 112 p. (Italian) ISBN 9788875494353
- Chiedimi chi Era Merckx. Le Stagioni di Eddy dall'Esordio al Congedo by Porreca G. Paolo in 2013, 237 p. (Italian) ISBN 9788867760206
- Merckx, il Figlio del Tuono (Merckx, the Son of Thunder) by Claudio Gregori in 2016, 570 p. (Italian) ISBN 9788898876587
- Gimondi & Merckx. La Sfida by Giorgio Martino in 2019, 159 p. (Italian) ISBN 9788898970469
- Eddy Merckx by Helmer Boelsen in 1973, 128 p. (German) ISBN 9783767900134
- Die Nacht, in der Ich Eddy Merckx Bezwang by Marc Locatelli in 2019, 48 p. (German) ISBN 9783037311936

== See also ==
- Cycling records – List of records completed on a bicycle
- List of foreign recipients of the Légion d'Honneur
- List of Giro d'Italia general classification winners
- List of Grand Tour general classification winners
- List of noble families in Belgium
- List of Tour de France general classification winners
- List of Tour de France secondary classification winners
- List of Vuelta a España classification winners
- List of Vuelta a España general classification winners
- Pink jersey statistics
- Yellow jersey statistics

Records
Preceded by Ole Ritter	UCI hour record (49.431 km); 25 October 1972 – 27 October 2000	Succeeded by Chris Boardman
Belgian nobility
New creation	Baron Merckx; 1996–	Incumbent
