= Eddy Merckx Cycles =

Belgian bicycle manufacturer

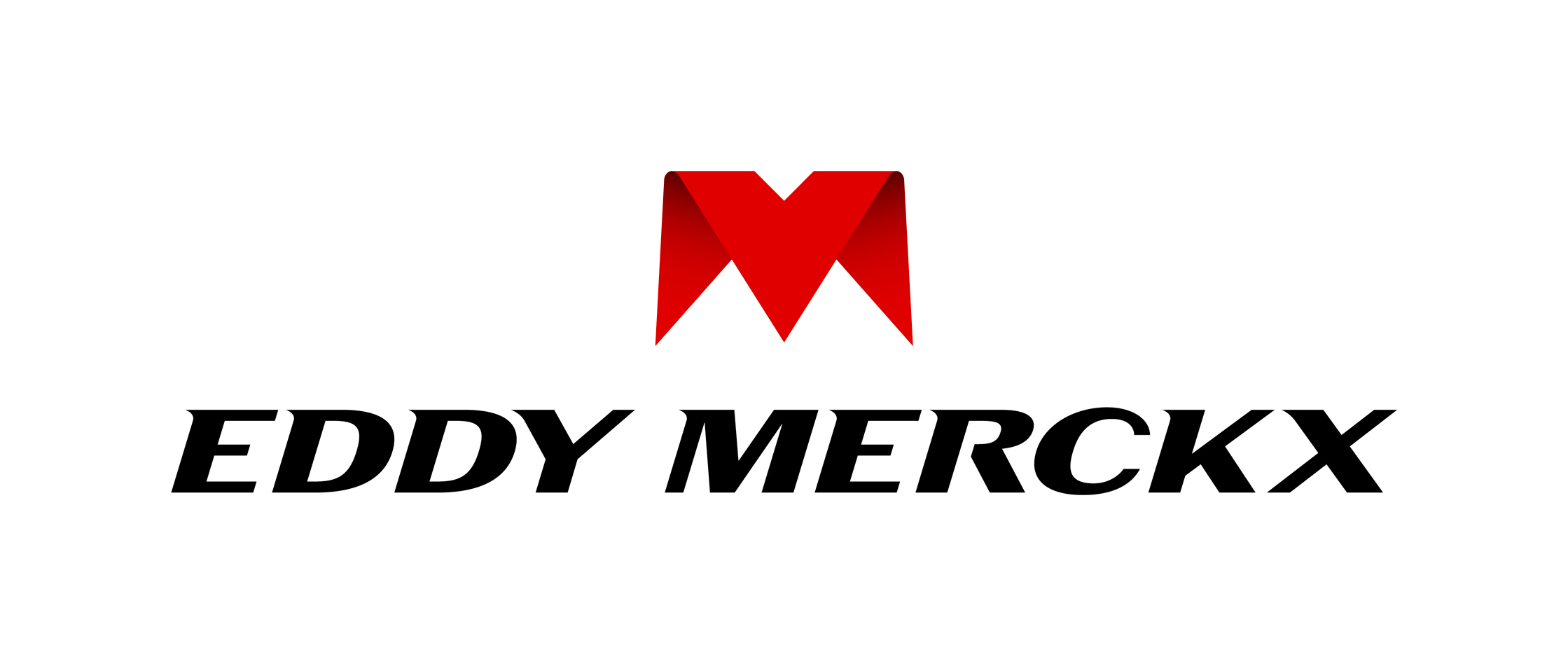
- Company type: Private
- Industry: Bicycles
- Founded: 1980
- Headquarters: Belgium
- Key people: Eddy Merckx (founder), Kurt Moons (CEO)
- Products: Bicycle and Related Components
- Website: eddymerckx.com

S.A. Cycles Eddy Merckx Rijwielen N.V., better known as Eddy Merckx, is a Belgian brand of high end road bikes, founded by former professional road cyclist Eddy Merckx in 1980.
