= 1971 Liège–Bastogne–Liège =

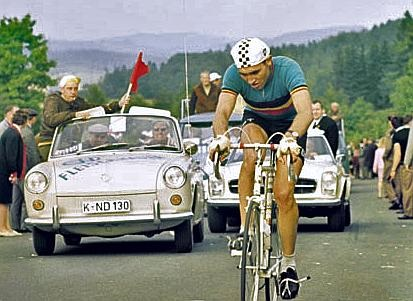
- Eddy Merckx (pictured in 1966) won his second Liège–Bastogne–Liège

Race details
- Dates: April 25, 1971
- Stages: 1
- Distance: 251 km (156 mi)
- Winning time: 6h 57' 10"

Results
	Winner	Eddy Merckx (BEL)	(Molteni)
	Second	Georges Pintens (BEL)	(Hertekamp-Magniflex)
	Third	Frans Verbeeck (BEL)	(Watneys-Avia)

The 57th edition of the Liège–Bastogne–Liège road cycling race in Belgium was held on 25 April 1971. Belgian Eddy Merckx concluded his second win in the monument classic, after beating his countryman Georges Pintens in a two-man sprint.

== Summary ==
Cycling icon Eddy Merckx attacked solo in Rocourt, at 92 kilometers from the finish in Liège, and soon had a five-minute advantage over his pursuers. In a rare display, he suffered a sudden fatigue on the Mont-Theux and was joined by Georges Pintens. Pintens failed to distance a tired Merckx, and Merckx managed to outsprint his fellow Belgian at the line to seal his second victory in the classic.

The race was run in harrowing weather conditions, with snow and cold rampaging the peloton. 27 of 122 starters finished the race. Years later, one of Merckx' soigneurs revealed that Merckx, suffering from exhaustion after the race, needed to shower on a chair.

== Results ==
#	Rider	Time
1.	(Belgium) Eddy Merckx	6h 57' 10"
2.	(Belgium) Georges Pintens	s.t.
3.	(Belgium) Frans Verbeeck	+ 4 ' 51 "
4.	(France) Gilbert Bellone	s.t.
5.	(Belgium) Antoine Houbrechts	s.t.
6.	(Belgium) Ferdinand Bracke	+ 5 ' 51 "
7.	(Belgium) Joseph Bruyère	s.t.
8.	(France) Raymond Delisle	+ 6 ' 45 "
9.	(Italy) Felice Gimondi	+ 6 ' 54 "
10.	(Italy) Attilio Benfatto	s.t.
