= Bravo Eddy! =

- 7" vinyl single cover

Single by Jean Narcy
- B-side: "Ah! Quelle Histoire"
- Released: 1970
- Recorded: 1969
- Genre: Schlager
- Label: Decca
- Songwriters: Carillon D'Avranches, Hector Delfosse, Jean Narcy, Jo Postula

"Bravo Eddy!" is a 1969 musical single by Jean Narcy (1932-2014), which celebrates Belgian cycling champion Eddy Merckx. The lyrics were written by J. Postule, C. Avranches, J. Narcy and H. Delfosse. It was released by Decca.

== Lyrics ==
There are two versions of the song, one recorded in 1969 and the second in 1970.

The song details how Eddy Merckx is "the king of cycling", applauded by "the entire world". It describes how everyone applauds and shouts his name as "the little Belgian" zooms by. The singer describes him as unbeatable and someone "who makes Roger Pingeon and Felice Gimondi suffer."

== Dutch-language translation ==
A Dutch-language version was released around the same time, but recorded by a different artist: Janneman.
