= List of songs about bicycles =

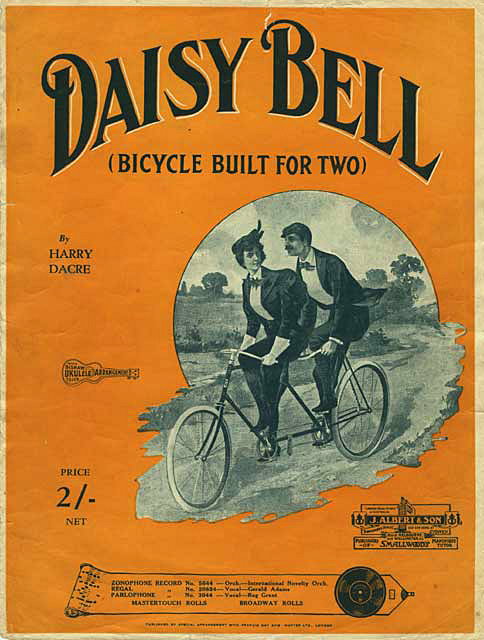
Harry Dacre's "Daisy Bell (Bicycle Built for Two)" was a popular success

This is a list of songs about bicycles or cycling.

Bicycles became popular in the 19th century as the new designs of safety bicycle were practical for the general population, including women. By the end of that century, cycling was a fashion or fad which was reflected in the popular songs of the day. The most famous of these was "Daisy Bell", inspired by the phrase "a bicycle made for two". The vogue for cycling songs continued into the Edwardian era and modern examples continue to appear in the 21st century.

== List ==
Title	Author	Year	Comments
"The Acoustic Motorbike"	Luka Bloom	1992	
"Amsterdam"	Riblja Čorba	1986	From the album Osmi nervni slom
"An Elegy for Baby Blue"	The Wonder Years (band)	2008	From "Won't Be Pathetic Forever" EP
"Apology Song"	The Decemberists	2001	From the 5 Songs EP
"A Bicicleta"	Toquinho	1983	Album Casa de brinquedos.
"La Bicicleta"	Carlos Vives & Shakira	2016	
"Bicicleta"	Marcos Valle	1985	
"Bicycle"	BC Unidos feat. Shungudzo	2017	From the EP Bicycle
"Bicycle"	Chungha	2021	From the album Querencia
”Bicycle”	Masters of Reality	2002	From the album Sunrise on the Sufferbus
"Bicycle"	Nico Touches the Walls	2011	From the album Humania
"Bicycle" (feat. klei)	filous	2018	
"Bicycle"	Xdinary Heroes	2023	From the album Deadlock (EP)
"Bicycle, Bicycle, You Are My Bicycle"	Be Your Own Pet	2006	From the album Be Your Own Pet
"Bicycle Episode"	J. M. Richards	1897	
"The Bicycle Girl"	Avery Oddfellow, F. W. Meacham	1895	
"Bicycle Race"	Queen	1978	
"Bicycle Song"	Red Hot Chili Peppers	2006	
"Bicycles Are Red Hot"	TV on the Radio	2002	From the album OK Calculator
"La Bicyclette"	Yves Montand	1968	From the album La Bicyclette
"Les Bicyclettes de Belsize"	Engelbert Humperdinck	1968	From the movie Les Bicyclettes de Belsize
"Bike"	cLOUDDEAD	2004	From the album Ten
"Bike"	Pink Floyd	1967	
"Bike Messenger Diaries"	ApSci	2005	B-side of the single "See That?"
"Bike Rider"	Mungo's Hi Fi feat. Pupajim	2014	From the album Serious Time
"The Bike Song"	Mark Ronson & The Business International	2010	
"Biking"	Frank Ocean	2017	Featuring, JAY Z and Tyler the Creator
"Black Mags"	The Cool Kids	2008	From the album The Bake Sale
"Brand New Key"	Melanie	1971	
"Bravo Eddy!"	Jean Narcy	1969/1970	
"C'mon Let Me Ride"	Skylar Grey feat. Eminem	2012	
"La complainte de l'heure de pointe (À vélo dans Paris)"	Joe Dassin	1972	From the album Joe
"Cycles to Gehenna"	Aesop Rock	2012	From the album Skelethon
"Cycling Is Fun"	Shonen Knife	1984	From their album Yama-no Attchan
"Daisy Bell"	Harry Dacre	1892	
"Death Of An Old Bike"	The Rosebuds	2014	
"Dora Brown"	Nelly Burt	1897	
"Eddy Est Imbattable!"	Pierre-André Gil	1971	
"Eddy Is Niet Te Kloppen!"	Frankie	1971	
"Eddy Prend Le Maillot Jaune"	Pierre-André Gil	1969	
"Des équilibristes"	Clio	1996	From album Clio
"Fahrrad"	Bläck Fööss	1982	From their album Morje Morje
"Fahrrad fahr'n"	Max Raabe	2017	From the album Der perfekte Moment... wird heut verpennt
"Fahrrad Fahrn"	Achim Reichel Oh Ha!	1996	
"Fahrradfahr'n"	Sternhagel	1982	
"Fahrradlied"	Binder & Krieglstein	2012	
"Fahrradsong"	Christoph Busse	1976	Aired in the German Sesame Street in 1978
"The Girl That's Up To Date"	Edward Harrigan, David Braham	1894	
"The Great Velocipede"	Frank Wilder	1869	Sung by W. F. Collins of the British Christy Minstrels
"Hadron Collision"	Propagandhi	2012	
"Handlebars"	Flobots	2005	
"Happy Cycling"	Boards of Canada	1998	From the album Music Has the Right to Children
"Have You A Wheel?"	O. A. Hoffmann	1895	
"Helter Smelter"	Fifteen	1994	
"Holky z Polabí"	Jaroslav Uhlíř a Zdeněk Svěrák	1993	From the album Není nutno…s
"In Bicicletta"	Riccardo Cocciante	1982	From the album Cocciante
"It's a Beautiful Day"	The Beach Boys	1979	
"The Kickstand Song"	Darren Hanlon	2002	From the album Hello Stranger
"The Latest Fad"	A. A. Condon	1895	
"Let's Have a Ride on Your Bicycle"	Max Miller	1953	
"A Lilac Harry Quinn"	Half Man Half Biscuit	1991	From McIntyre, Treadmore and Davitt
"Mein Fahrrad"	Die Prinzen	1992	
"My Bike"	The Bennies	2013	From the Better off Dread EP
"My Bike"	Y.N.RichKids	2013	
"My 'Cycle Gal"	Philip Wales	1899	
"My White Bicycle"	Tomorrow	1967	About the Provos'. And a UK hit for the cover from Nazareth in 1975.
"New Bicycle Hornpipe"	Norman & Nancy Blake	1985	From the album Lighthouse on the Shore
"The New Columbia Wheel"	George Lowell Tracy, James C. Dunn	1898	
"The New Velocipede"	E. H. Sherwood	1869	
"Nine Million Bicycles"	Katie Melua	2005	
"On My Bike"	Bikeride	1997	From the album Here Comes the Summer
"Op Fietse"	Skik	1997	From the album Niks is zoas 't lek
"Pedal Your Blues Away"	Earl Rouse and Brothers	1936	
"Physics Of A Bicycle"	cLOUDDEAD	2001	B-side of the EP "The Peel Session"
"Poppin' A Wheelie!"	The Aquabats	2011	Hi-Five Soup!
"The Pushbike Song"	The Mixtures	1970	And a cover by Mungo Jerry (1990, UK).
"Rennrad"	Dota	2016	
"Riding Bikes"	Shellac	2014	From the album Dude Incredible
"Riding on My Bike"	Madness	1982	B-side and reworking of "Driving in My Car"
"Riding on My Bike"	Sia	2020	From the album At Home with the Kids
"See That My Bike's Kept Clean"	Half Man Half Biscuit	1997	From the album Voyage to the Bottom of the Road
"Shimano XTR"	Ćelo & Abdï	2017	
"Silver Machine"	Hawkwind	1972	A UK hit about Robert Calvert's silver bicycle.
"Stadtrad"	Binder & Krieglstein	2018	From the album Trommeln der Nacht
"Ten Speed (Of God’s Blood & Burial)"	Coheed and Cambria	2005	
"Terry Keeps His Clips On"	Vivian Stanshall	1981	
"Tour de France"	Kraftwerk	1983	From their cycling concept album for the centenary of the Tour de France in 2003 — Tour de France Soundtracks.
"Vas-Y Eddy"	Jean Saint-Paul	1967	
"Velocipede Jimmy"	O. H. Harpel, Henry Atkins	1869	
"Two on a Bike"	Six Hits and a Miss	1942	
"Two Wheels"	Wax	2011	Scrublife
"Yellow Bike"	Pedro the Lion	2019	From the album Phoenix
"Bicycle"	RM	2021	Unofficial Release
"Bicycle Wheels"	Ugly Kid Joe	1996	
"Training Wheels"	Melanie Martinez	2015	From the album Cry Baby
"Bicycle Song"	Monkey (band)	2015	From Bananarchy
