= Colectivo 59 =

59
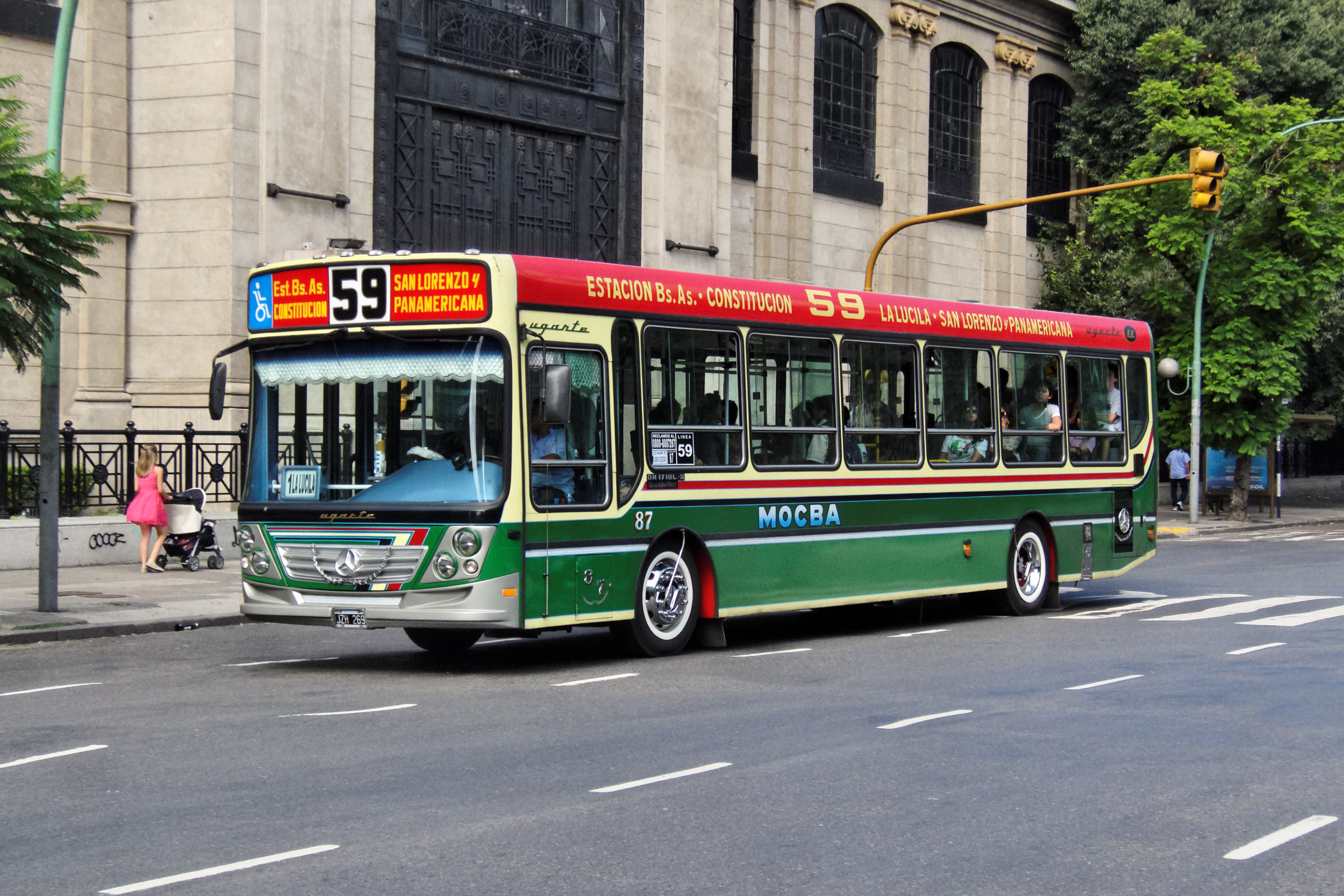

Overview
- Operator: Micro Ómnibus Ciudad de Buenos Aires S.A.T.C.I.
- Vehicle: Mercedes-Benz O500UA-2836; Mercedes-Benz OH1721LSB Bluetec 5
- Began service: September 27, 1928

Route
- Start: Barracas; Constitución
- End: Florida; Munro

Buenos Aires bus route 59 connects the Barracas neighbourhood with the north of the city. Route 59, along with 60 and 152, are the most famous and touristic lines in the Argentine capital. Route 59 is the oldest in the city, created on September 27, 1928.

Route 59 runs between Barracas or Constitución and Florida or Munro.

== History ==
Route 59 has its origins a share taxi just three days after the creation of this transport system, on September 27, 1928. At first it was identified with the number 4, due to the similarity of the route with that of tram 4 of the Lacroze company. Initially it linked Plaza de Mayo with the corner of Cabildo and Congreso, in Belgrano, but it suffered repeated extensions that extended the route.

The route was successively extended to Cabildo and Manzanares (Plaza Balcarce) and to Puente Saavedra at its northern end and to Plaza Constitución in a first stage and to the Rawson Hospital later, at the south.

By 1934 to 1935 the bus route reached Greater Buenos Aires, when it reached Olivos. In the Guía Expreso of September 1935 it appears as extended (although the extension could have been done earlier). And there is a fact that seems to indicate this: according to the Revista del Transporte Colectivo of February 1934, the line already had 94 units. Other information dated December 31, 1936, indicates that the brand new 59 (renumbered on October 21, 1935) had 93, one less than in February 1934. By that time the buses had changed their initial configuration. The collective taxis gave way to the first bodied buses and each line had already adopted a distinctive colour.

The 59 adopted a light green for the roof up to the stripe, which was painted dark green, and grey (called “London grey”) for its lower section, which it kept until it was taken over by the Buenos Aires City Transport Corporation (Corporación de Transportes de la Ciudad de Buenos Aires). Before passing into its hands, its route had been extended to Maipú and Moreno, in La Lucila. In addition, it did not circulate for several months, due to the strikes promoted by the bus drivers to resist the seizure of the lines by the Corporation first and because of the Corporation's inability to rehabilitate it later.

Many private bus routes taken over by the Corporation never circulated again, due to the shortage of available buses, many units (due to lack of spare parts caused by the Second World War) were abandoned in yards, this had as a consequence the impossibility of rehabilitating all the pre-existing services.

At the beginning of July 1943 the Control Commission ordered the Corporation to rehabilitate Route 59. On July 10, 1943, the 59 returned to the streets, although with other colors, wax on its lower section, cream on its roof and red for the stripe. Gradually, the company replaced its old 11-seat buses with the remembered 14-seat extended buses, with which it attempted to revamp its fleet. In 1947, a short-lived split service was inaugurated between Plaza Italia and La Lucila, which was discontinued in May 1950.

On January 1, 1952, it passed into the hands of the General Administration of Transport of Buenos Aires (TBA), the state successor of the Corporation. One of the first measures taken was to renew its fleet of old minibuses with modern Bedford OBs, on May 11, 1952. With these cars, the new corporate livery of the brand new state entity would arrive on the line, entirely silver with a blue stripe and a new number, 259, adopted in order to highlight the renewal of its fleet. Shortly after, its route was extended to the southern end in two stages. The first, of which we do not have the date, took its terminus to the corner of Suárez and Vélez Sársfield, in the heart of the Barracas neighborhood. The second extension, implemented on August 15, 1954, reached the Buenos Aires station of the General Belgrano National Railway. However, the route would not be in the hands of the national State for long.

By means of resolution number 240/55 of the Ministry of Transport of the Nation, on July 8, 1955, the minibus routes operated by TBA were transferred to its staff, at a rate of two agents per bus.

The 259 remained in the possession of Micro Ómnibus Ciudad de Buenos Aires, a company created by the employees of TBA which in 1963 became a public limited company. It received 73 Bedford OBs which at first kept the state silver on their lower part, while their roof was painted red and the stripe black.

Because the new colour was likely to cause confusion as it resembled the livery of line 12, the silver was replaced by medium green, and cream trim was added, which contributed to enhancing the appearance of the livery that still distinguishes the bus on route 59 today. The Bedford OBs were kept for several years, although they were replaced by more modern units. Although the Mercedes Benz and the new Bedfords of national manufacture were the majority, there were some strange examples such as the Deutz, some Ford from the beginning of the 1960s. For many years the headers were not modified, although the intermediate route was. For many reasons (conversion to single lane of many two-lane avenues, for example) its route changed.

On January 2, 1969, as part of a general restructuring of the line numbers regulated by resolution 750/68, in which bus routes in the capital proper are assigned numbers 1 to 199, route 259 was renumbered back to route 59. By the beginning of the 1970s, its fleet was quite up-to-date. Although it still had a few Mercedes Benz L 312s from the early 1960s, the bulk of the fleet was made up of the then modern LO 1112 and LO 1114. Between 1971 and 1974, a major renovation was carried out and a huge number of buses were brought in, mainly by El Indio. It was the emblematic model of the 59 during that decade and the beginning of the next.

Around 1980, branch 2 was opened, which branched off from the main line (from then on identified as 1) to reach the Olivos Cemetery. Later, in June 1983, branch 2 was extended to the intersection of the Panamericana highway and San Lorenzo Street. From 1986, when the line incorporated branch signs, it was identified as Barrio Golf. In May 1993, a differential service was inaugurated between Maipú and Panamericana and Plaza Constitución. Brand new Mercedes Benz OH 1420 buses with 45 seats, built by Imeca, were incorporated.

Route 59 had the honour of being the first line to put a low-floor bus with a ramp for users with reduced mobility on the road, although only on a trial basis. It was bus 201. It was designed by Mr. Jorge Beritich and built by the company Tecnoporte S.A.

In 2024, MOCBA acquired Empresa Antártida Argentina S.A.T., the operator of bus route 95 in Buenos Aires.
