= Dota (disambiguation) =

Dota is a series of strategy video games by Valve.

Dota or DOTA may also refer to:

== Arts and entertainment ==
=== Video games ===
- Defense of the Ancients (DotA), a mod for the video game Warcraft III: Reign of Chaos
- Dota 2, a standalone sequel to DotA
- Dota Underlords, a strategy game spin-off to Dota 2

=== Other ===
- Dota (singer) (born 1979), German singer-songwriter
- "Vi sitter i Ventrilo och spelar DotA" or "DotA", a song by Basshunter
  - "DotA", 2008 Now You're Gone – The Album version
- Dota: Dragon's Blood, American animated show
- Basshunter Dota Revival, promotional video for series Dota: Dragon's Blood

== Other uses ==
- Dota (canton), a canton in the province of San José, Costa Rica
- DOTA (chelator), a chemical
- Declaration of the Americas on Diabetes (DOTA 1996), a regional declaration following the St. Vincent Declaration
- DOTA (bus company), an Argentine public transport company

== See also ==
- DOTA-TATE, a substance used in cancer treatment
- 90Y-DOTA-biotin, another substance used in cancer treatment
