= Colectivo 39 =

39
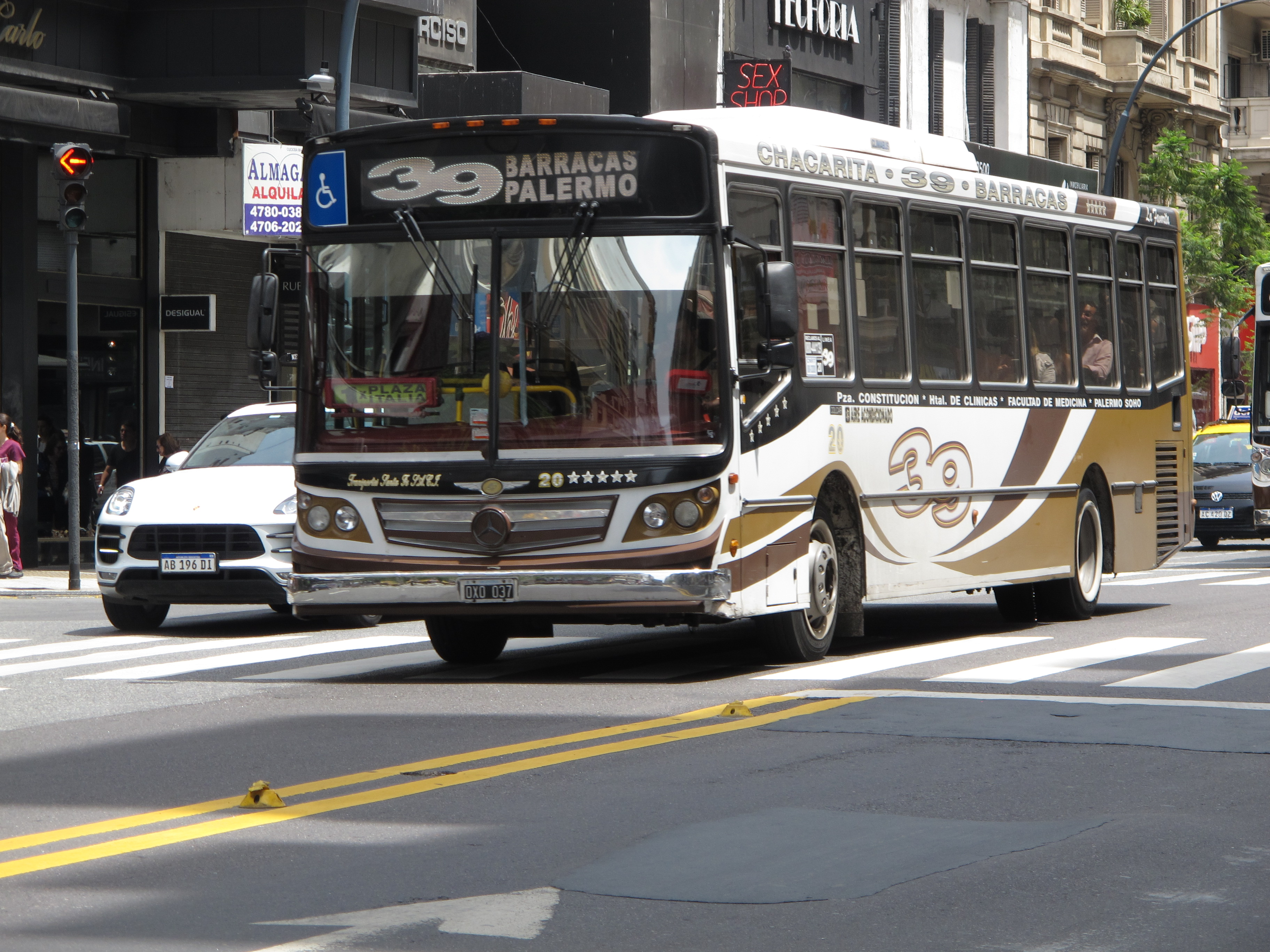

Overview
- Operator: Transportes Santa Fe S.A.C.I.
- Began service: February 8, 1932

Route
- Start: Chacarita
- End: Barracas; Constitución

Buenos Aires bus route 39 is a bus route running between Chacarita and Barracas or Constitución. It is operated by Transportes Santa Fe S.A.C.I.

It runs from the intersection of Avenida Regimiento de Patricios and Calle Pedro de Mendoza, in the Buenos Aires neighbourhood of Barracas, to Jorge Newbery street, in the Buenos Aires neighbourhood of Chacarita. It passes through areas such as Constitución, Monserrat, Tribunales, Avenida Santa Fe, Palermo and Colegiales. It is characterized by its striking paint scheme that combines two shades of brown with white and gold details.

Child actor Carlitos Balá began his artistic career acting in the line's units, which frequently pay tribute to him with messages on them.

== History ==
Bus route 39 originally began operations as route 32, and its original route was between Santa Fe and Carranza in Palermo, via Caseros and Hornos, next to the Constitución station.

The opening date was confirmed by the authorities of the line, in light of a variety of data found from various sources that indicate that it started the day after, on the 15th and until the 22nd of February. The truth is that in a short time the line added 30 buses and extended its route through both termini. In August 1932, with 40 buses, it reached its current terminal at Pedro de Mendoza and Patricios, in Barracas, and Nicaragua (or El Salvador) and Arévalo on the other side.

In 1936, the route was cut off at Charlone and Lacroze, between Chacarita and Colegiales, and the bus drivers were established at Charlone 609. In four years of existence, the fleet had grown to 50 cars. But bad times were approaching for the union: the Law of Transport Coordination had been approved in Congress, which gave rise to the Corporation of Transport of the City of Buenos Aires (CTCBA), and the bus drivers were up in arms against the looming monopoly.

On September 4, 1942, in response to the start of bus seizures by the government, a strike began that lasted 12 days. And as there were no possible negotiations in the face of the corporation's intransigence, a new strike was declared on October 16, this time definitively.

As the Corporation seized buses, it rehabilitated lines, irregularly and with a significant reduction in frequencies. The independent bus drivers, for their part, were inactive but firm in their position. Finally, on February 5, 1943, the "ownership" agreement was signed between the corporation and the owners of 13 routes that had not been rehabilitated, including route 39. Through this agreement, the original owners ceded their exploitation rights and ownership of the vehicles to the corporation, in exchange for precarious ownership, for no less than 90 days, a period in which they could operate the service at their own risk.

This desperate decision was an emergency exit for the bus drivers, pressed by the lack of income after a three-and-a-half-month strike. On February 14, the 13 routes returned to the streets, hoping for a miracle that would save them after the 90 days established by the agreement. And, believe it or not, the miracle happened, although only for some. The new government that emerged on June 4, 1943, halted the expropriations and 6 of the 13 lines were able to continue as private lines. However, for many years they continued to be called "ownership lines," among them being route 39.

The Corporation seized 9 buses from the line, internal numbers 10, 12, 19, 28, 29, 33, 38, 39 and 49, whose numbers, as a sign of protest, were never replaced. Safe, the service grew slowly but steadily. In 1948, the famous Chevrolet "toad" cars arrived, a nickname well earned due to the shape of their nose, which marked an era on the route 39.

In April 1961, the change of route 39's terminus to Lacroze and Fraga was authorised, and shortly after to Maure and Forest, taking effect on September 21. Almost a year later, on September 20, 1962, Transportes Santa Fe S.A. was established. During those years, the arrival of the Bedfords manufactured in the country by General Motors marked a new milestone in the company's fleet. Three lots were acquired with frontage on 3943 Jorge Newbery street, where the current terminal was built.

The redevelopment of the area between the Mitre Railway tracks and Dorrego Market, in Colegiales, generated a new demand for transportation. On March 1, 1992, the 39 was split, with the trunk line identified as branch 1 and the new route, along Crámer and Costa Rica streets, as branch 2.

Semi-fast services also began to run in May 1993. This new modality promised to speed up the line's traffic during peak hours, but it did not perform as expected and was soon replaced by a split line in Constitución. In 1995, a new semi-fast service and differential service were authorized, which were never provided. At the end of the year, after a survey carried out among almost 10,000 users, the National Commission of Automotive Transport (CONTA) distinguished the line for its services.

== Service ==
The service operates 24 hours a day, 365 days a year. Its frequencies range from 7/15/20 minutes per branch, depending on the day and time, and at the same time during peak demand times (working days between 6 a.m. and 6 p.m.) it is reinforced with a split service to Plaza Constitución with a frequency of 10 minutes or from Av. Santa Fe and Pueyrredón streets to Barracas.
