= DOTA (bus company) =

Argentine public transport company

DOTA Colectivos S.A. (DOTA)
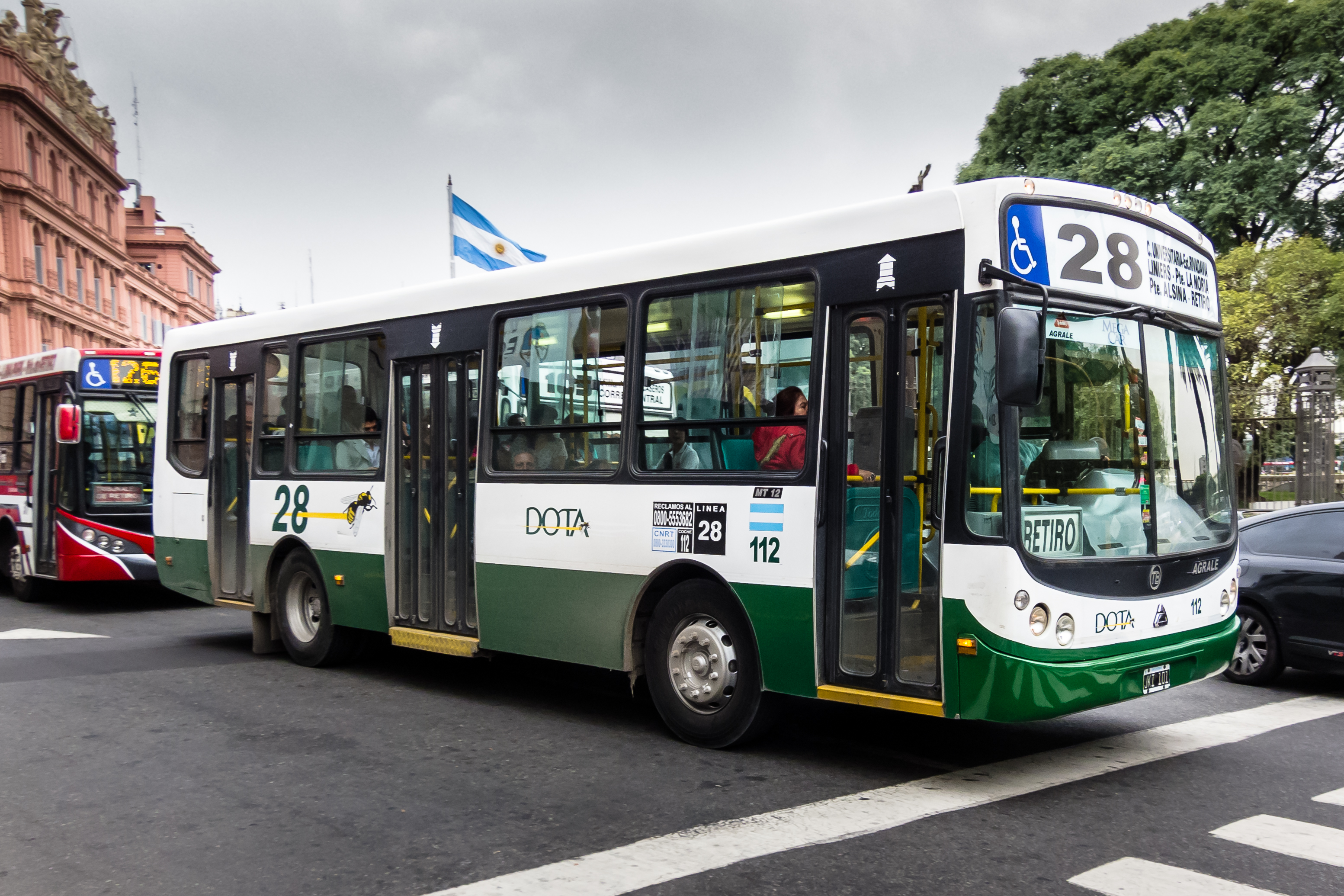
- A DOTA bus on route 28
- Founded: July 9, 1955
- Headquarters: Buenos Aires, Argentina
- Service area: Buenos Aires, Argentina
- Service type: Public transport bus service
- Routes: 182
- Manager: Ángel Faijá; José Faijá
- Website: https://www.dota.com.ar/

DOTA Colectivos S.A., commonly abbreviated DOTA, is an Argentine public transport company. DOTA owns other public transportation companies and operates a wide variety of bus lines. DOTA also owns Megacar, the representative of the Brazilian company Agrale in Argentina, and controls the bus body manufacturer TodoBus. The company is based in the city of Buenos Aires and is the largest bus operator in Argentina, with a total of 182 of the 390 bus routes operated in Buenos Aires Metropolitan Area alone.

== History ==
DOTA was founded in 1955 as the operator of the main bus route, route 208 (current route 28), which connected the Constitución station to the Alsina Bridge. It then acquired route 114, which connected the Alsina Bridge to the Rivadavia station of the General Bartolomé Mitre Railway. The line continued to extend its route towards Retiro and towards Ciudad Universitaria. The company began to achieve success thanks to the new rapid routes on Route 28, and also because public transport began to be subsidised in the 1990s, which allowed it to acquire other smaller public transport companies (thus creating the "DOTA Empire").

During the 1990s and early 2000s, the company would grow based on million-dollar subsidies that were diverted by the corporation to buy smaller bus companies, establishing a monopoly in several locations in Buenos Aires.

In 2010, DOTA bought route 60, together with the companies Nuevos Rumbos, Rosario Bus and Micro Ómnibus Tigre. However, the other two companies later withdrew from the partnership. This purchase generated conflicts and a large number of strikes, with the service suspended for 42 days in 2015. Some workers also went on hunger strikes.

In 2015, it acquired the San Vicente Company, one of the largest in the southern area of Greater Buenos Aires, after which it carried out a significant reduction in services. In the same year, it took over the company Atlántida, operator of route 57. A year later it took over Transporte Automotor Riachuelo, operator of routes 100, 115, 134 and 446, lines 505, 506 and 521 of Almirante Brown, the first operated under the company General Tomas Guido and the last two under Empresa San Vicente, in 2017 it took over routes 514 of Almirante Brown, previously managed by Expreso Arseno. Also in 2018 but in the month of September it stops running line 446 that it had acquired in 2016, in 2018 it took over the semi-rapid service of routes 8, whose route begins in Plaza de Mayo and ends in Ezeiza.

Since 2019, a large part of the bus routes operated by DOTA (and its subsidiaries) have gone on strike, amid an internal fight between different sectors of the Unión Tranviarios Automotor (UTA), facing the then leader Roberto Fernández. In that year, route 164 (formerly route 165) was taken over by the subsidiary General Tomas Guido, which was obtained after a tender for the lines of the former Expreso Lomas, after it went into default and stopped providing service for several months due to a union strike by staff, who were demanding wages owed to its previous owner. In addition, two express services of bus route 51 were inaugurated and the service of bus route 74 was cut back to Burzaco, later extending it to Longchamps, but not to Glew, which was the original terminal of the route. In March 2022, the express branch of route 164 was recovered. At the end of 2023, DOTA merges routes 5 and 8 into a single bus route (8), thus enabling the new route that links Aeroparque Jorge Newbery with Ministro Pistarini International Airport, leaving the routes of the original lines as secondary branches. In January 2024, DOTA acquired routes 283 and 523, by absorbing the Andrade Company from Lanús.

== Companies operated by DOTA ==
In the 1990s, the company began to expand by acquiring other lines and smaller companies, or by partnering with others to operate services. The group is currently divided into the following subsidiaries:

- DOTA: Routes 28, 44 and 101.
- Transportes Río Grande: Routes 8 and 23.
- Transportes Lope de Vega: Routes 56, 76, 91 and 135.
- Transportes Larrazabal: Routes 20, 117, 161, 188 and 421.
- Los Constituyentes: Routes 78, 87, 111, and 127.
- Transportes Av. Bernardo Ader (TABA): Route 130
- Transporte 12 de Octubre: Route 7
- Colectiveros Unidos (CUSA): Routes 99 and 106.
- Empresarios del Transporte Automotor de Pasajeros (ETAPSA): Route 24.
- Empresa de Transportes Tte. General Roca: Routes 21 and 108.
- Rocaraza: Routes 31 and 146.
- Micro Omnibus Norte (MONSA): Route 60.
- Micro Omnibus Avenida (MOASA): Routes 405, 514 and 520.
- Transportes Atlántida: Routes 57, 410 and 429.
- Transporte Automotor Riachuelo (TARSA): Routes 100, 115 and 134.
- Compañía Andrade: Routes 283 and 523.

=== Associated operating bus routes ===
- with Grupo Autobuses:
  - General Tomás Guido S.A. (since 2012): Routes 9, 25, 84, 164, 271, 299, 373, 384, and 570.
- with Grupo Autobuses and Expreso Esteban Echeverría:
  - Empresa San Vicente S.A.T. (since 2015): Routes 51, 74, 79, 177, 263, 370, 385, 388, 403, 435 and 503.
- Grupo Autobuses BS AS: Routes 548, 540 and 542.
- with Nuevos Rumbos S.A.:
  - NUDO: Routes 6, 50, 107, 150 and 168.

=== Businesses related to motor vehicles ===
- MegaCar: A dealership representative of Brazilian chassis manufacturer Agrale in Argentina.
- TodoBus bus bodies.
- Td Servicio de Logística Transporte del Sur S.R.L.

=== Bus routes formerly operated under DOTA ===
Until 2017, DOTA operated the following bus routes:

- Route 505
- Route 506
- Route 521

These lines were separated from the DOTA Group through a tender made by the mayor of Almirante Brown. They were operated until 2017 by the companies General Tomás Guido S.A.C.I.F and Empresa San Vicente S.A.T. Currently, the three lines are operated by Empresa Transportes del Sur S.R.L.
