= Constitución, Buenos Aires =

Coordinates: 34°38′S 58°23′W

Constitución
- Neighborhood of Buenos Aires
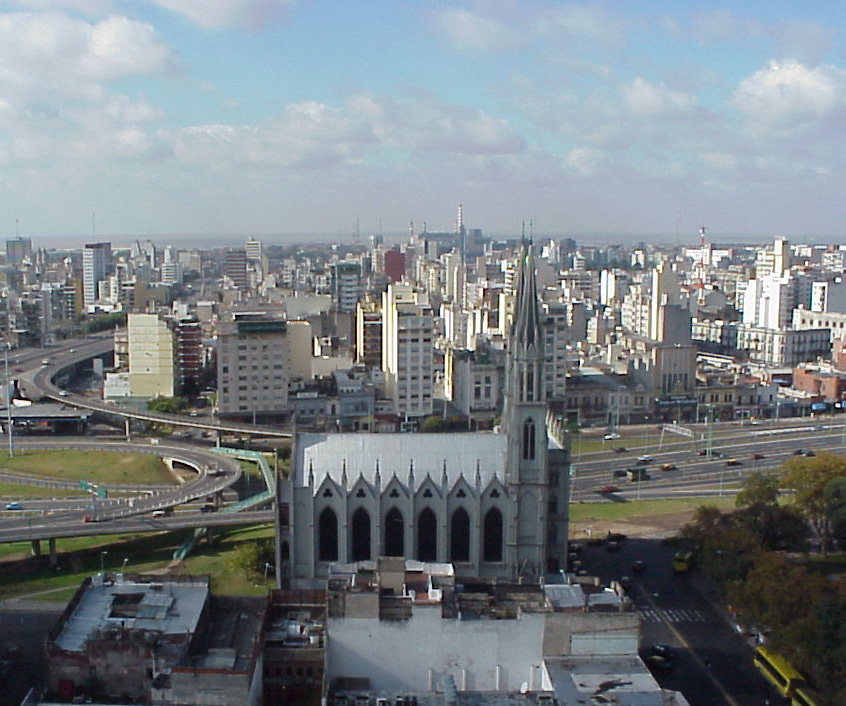
- Constitución and the Church of the Immaculate Conception of Mary
- Interactive map of Constitución
- Country: Argentina
- Autonomous City: Buenos Aires
- Comuna: C1

Area
  - Total: 2.1 km^{2} (0.81 sq mi)

Population (2001)
  - Total: 45,860
  - Density: 22,000/km^{2} (57,000/sq mi)
- Time zone: UTC-3 (ART)

Constitución is a barrio or neighborhood of Buenos Aires, Argentina, approximately two kilometers south of downtown.

The borough is centered on Constitución Station and the square of the same name and can be reached by subway, by bus (notably Colectivo 60) and enjoys easy access by car via 9 de Julio, San Juan and Caseros Avenues, as well as the 25 de Mayo toll road.

The neighborhood is home to the Argentine University of Enterprise and the University of Buenos Aires Faculty of Social Sciences.

== History ==
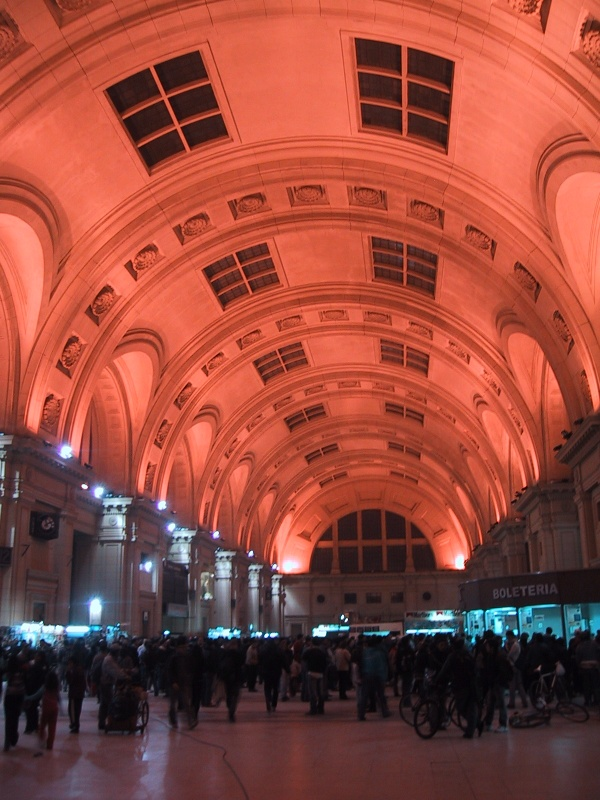
Ceiling in Constitución station

The area, on the outskirts of Buenos Aires in colonial times, was granted a parish in 1769 and incorporated into the city in 1777. Home to an important mission of Bethlehemites, they maintained a convalescent clinic there until their papal suppression in 1821. The area then became home to a large farmer's market and its relative elevation began attracting development. The market was renamed in honor of the recently promulgated Argentine Constitution in 1856 and the neighborhood, long centered on the market, soon acquired the name.

Work began in 1864 on the Buenos Aires Great Southern Railway led the opening of a station at the market and with it, the rapid growth of the area as an immigrants' quarter. Groundbreaking for a new railway terminal in 1885 was accompanied by the razing of the market in favor of Constitución Plaza. A non-profit clinic opened by the Anglican Reverend Barton Lodge in 1844 became the British Hospital in 1887 (still the borough's largest). The neighborhood was subsequently home to Hipólito Yrigoyen, a co-founder of the centrist Radical Civic Union in 1891 who tirelessly campaigned for and, in 1912, won the right to universal (male) suffrage in Argentina and the secret ballot. Elected president in 1916, his Constitución home was ransacked during a coup against him in 1930.

The mayor appointed in 1976 by Argentina's last dictatorship, Osvaldo Cacciatore, had plans drawn up for eight freeways within the city proper, three of which were finished. The two busiest, the 25 de Mayo and 9 de Julio Freeways, meet at a junction north of Constitución station. The structures, though a great benefit to commuters, led to the exodus of much of the neighborhood's middle class.

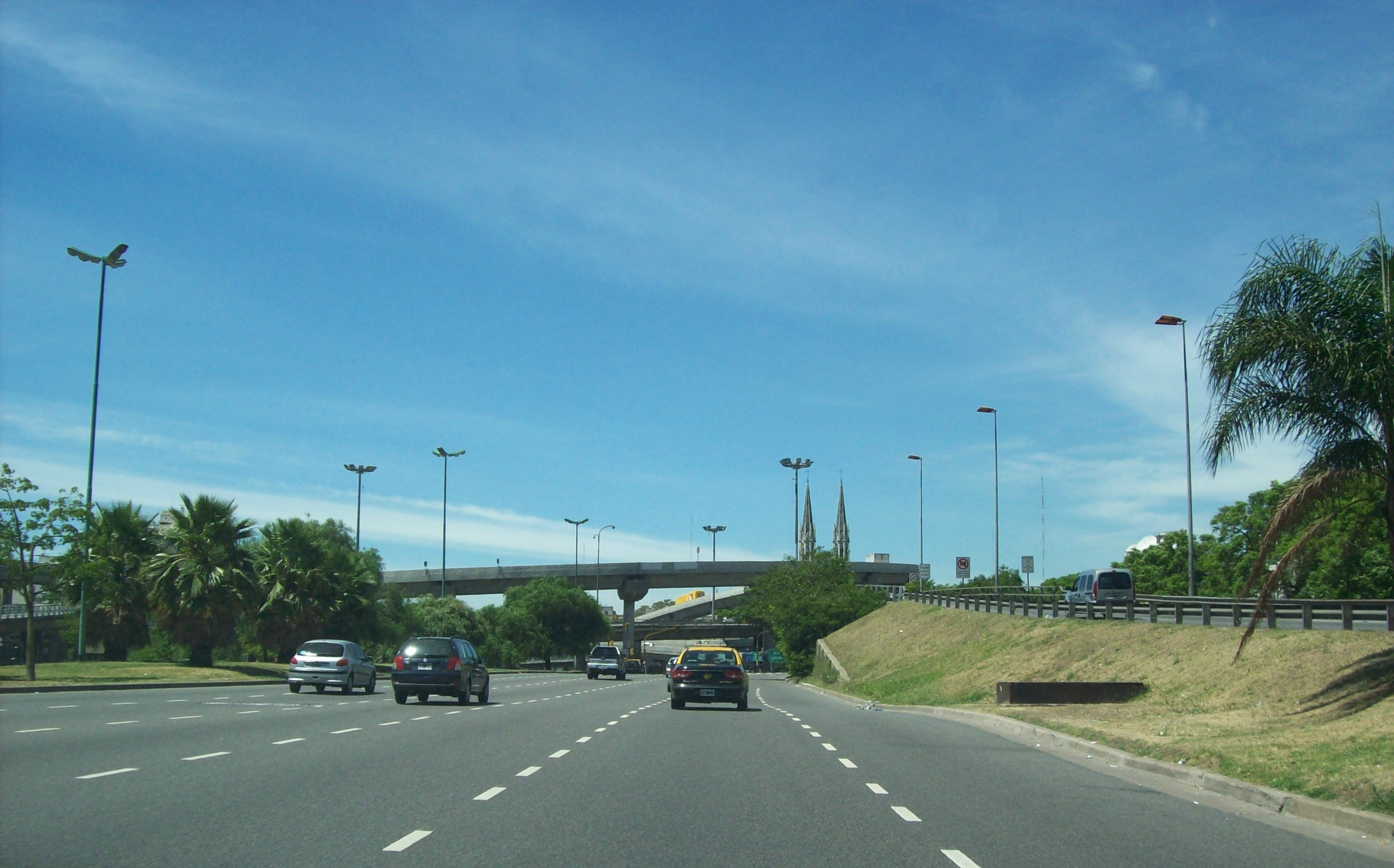
Ninth of July Expressway

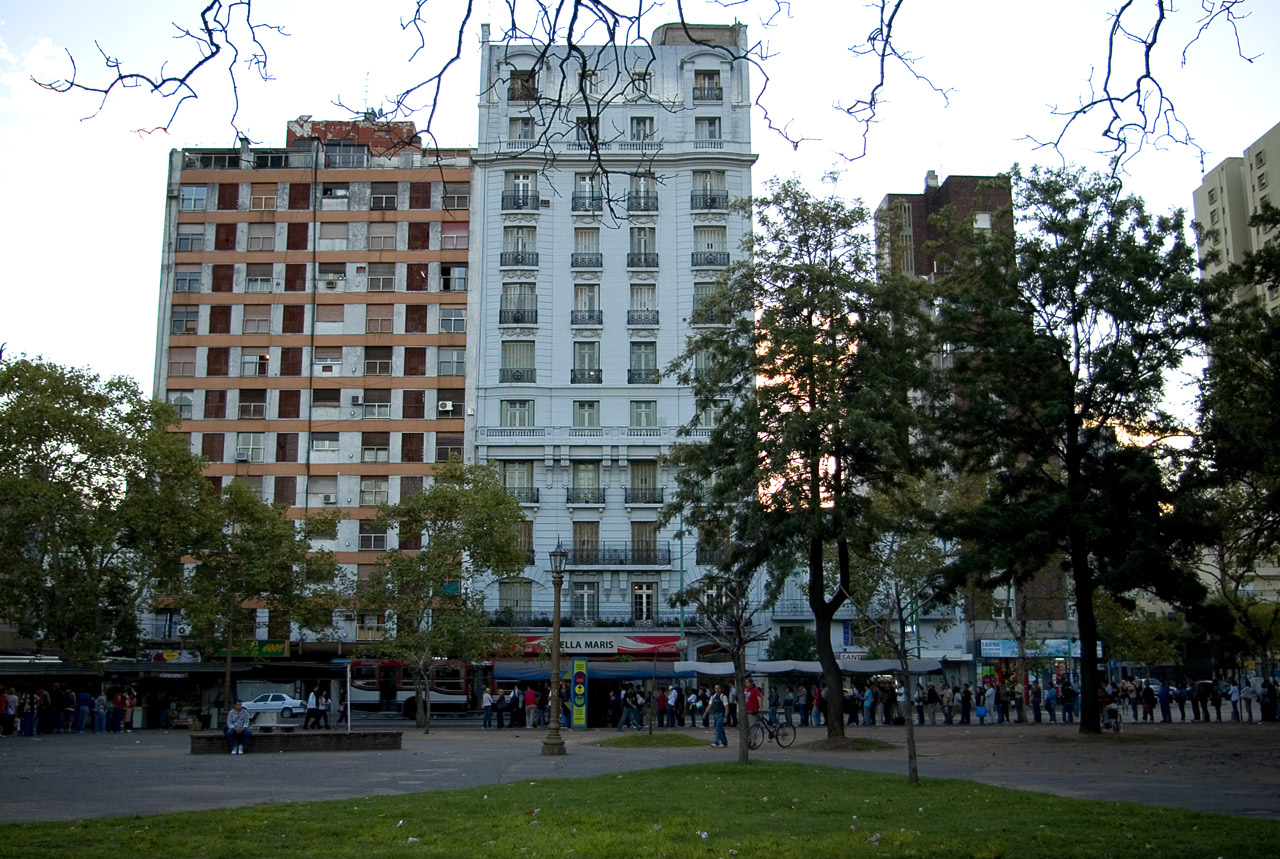
Constitución Square

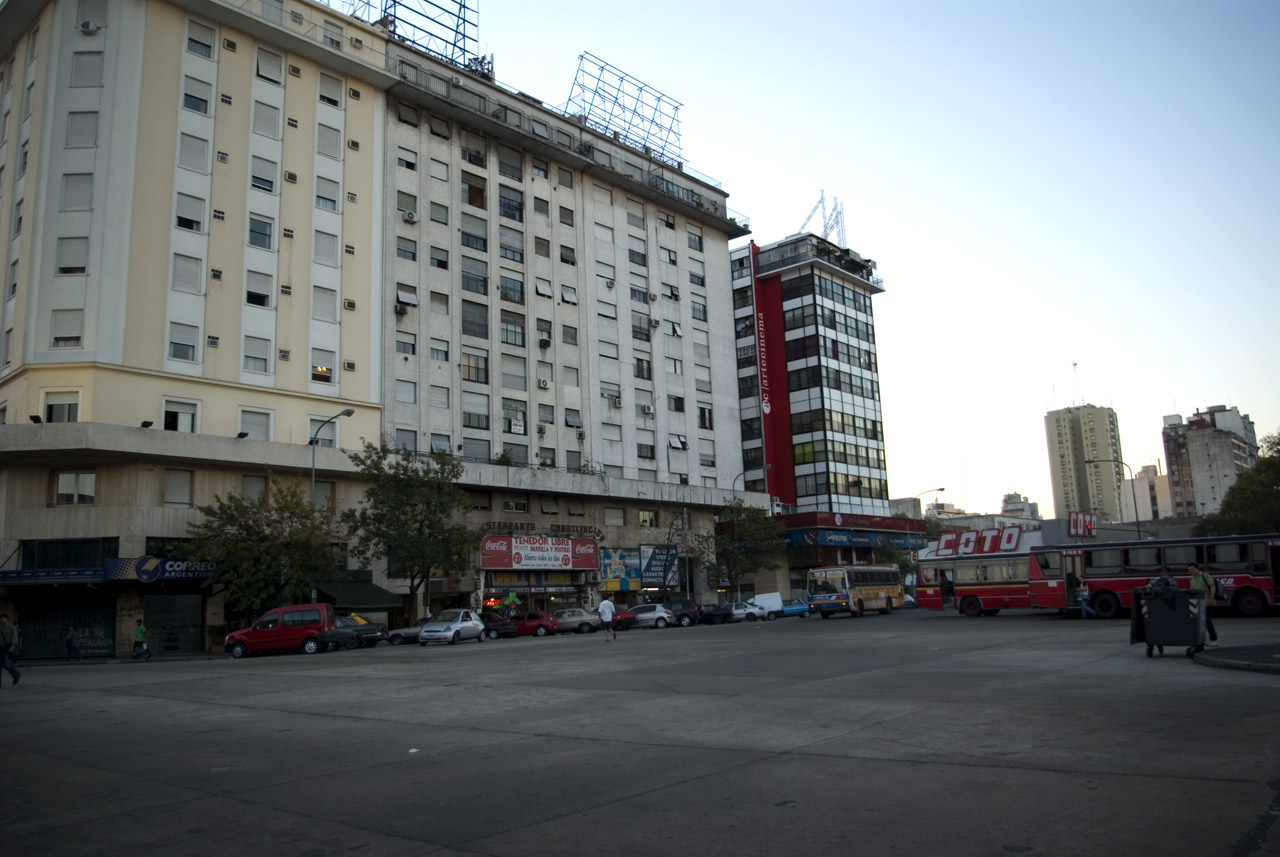
Rationalist architecture near the station

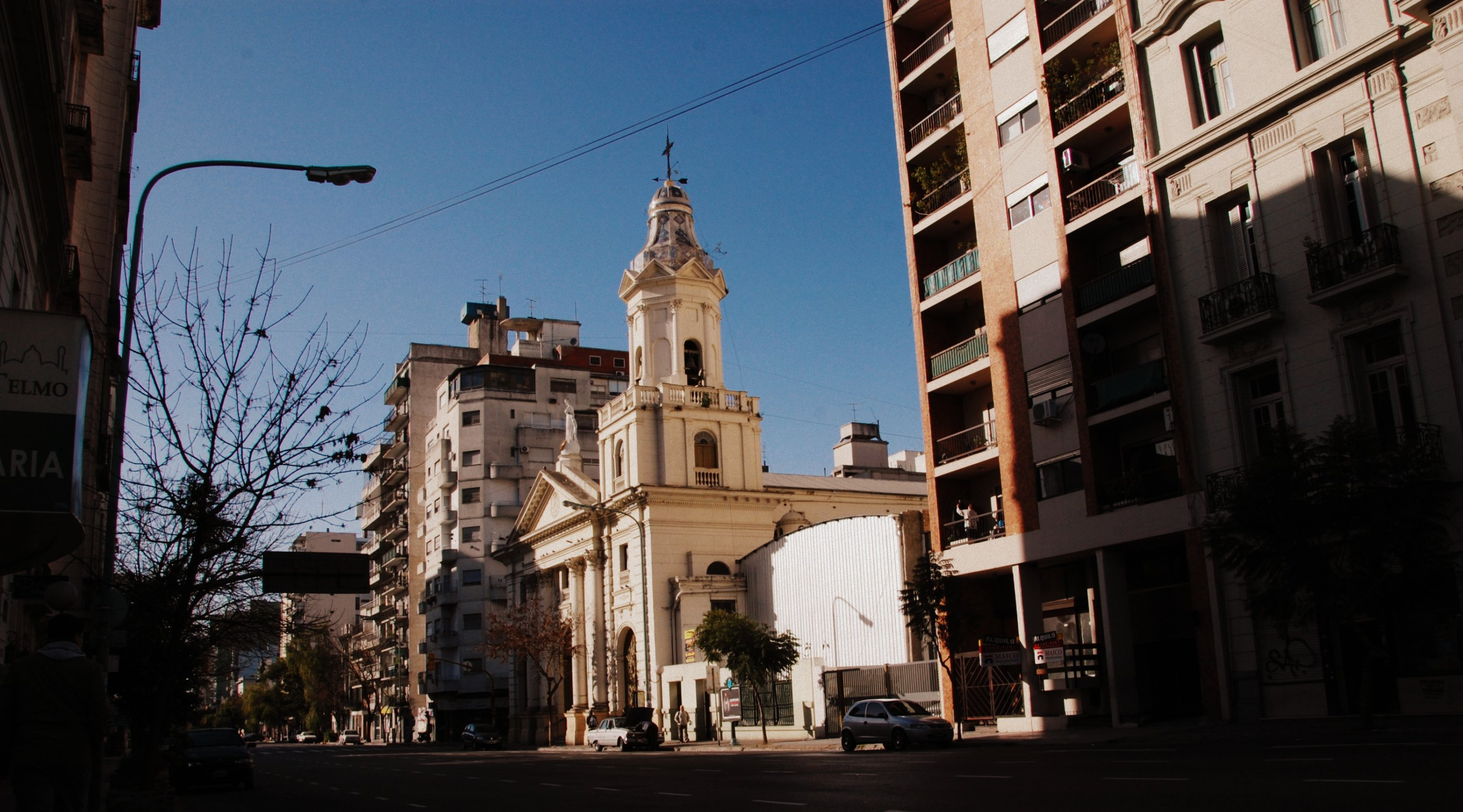
Independencia Avenue
