= La Bicyclette =

Studio album by Yves Montand
- Released: 1968
- Genre: Chanson
- Length: 33:13
- Label: Philips

La Bicyclette is an album of the French singer Yves Montand, released in 1968.

No.	Title	Writer(s)	Length
1.	"La Bicyclette"	Pierre Barouh/Francis Lai	2:45
2.	"Le jazz et la java"	Claude Nougaro/Joseph Haydn/Jacques Datin	2:36
3.	"La Musique"	Philippe-Gérard/Jean Dréjac	3:48
4.	"Barcarolette"	Jean Guigo/Jean Constantin	2:55
5.	"Mes jolies vacances"	Hervé Rostaing/H. Pasquier	2:48
6.	"Les Berceaux"	Sully Prudhomme/Gabriel Fauré	2:24
7.	"Madrid"	Jean-Jacques Debout/Roger Dumas	2:11
8.	"Napoli Jolie"		2:28
9.	"C'est de la faute à l'accordéon"	Francis Lemarque/René Rouzaud	2:58
10.	"Nuit de Camargue"	Bob Castella/Michel Rivgauche	3:06
11.	"Pluie"	Pierre Barouh/Francis Lai	2:32
12.	"Le Télégramme" (with Simone Signoret)	Simone Signoret	3:42
Total length:			33:13
