= Eddy Prend Le Maillot Jaune =

- 7" vinyl single cover

Single by Pierre-André Gil
- B-side: "Mamma, Mamma Mia"
- Released: 1969
- Genre: Schlager
- Label: Columbia
- Songwriters: Luc Verbist, Noël Lambré, Pierre-André Gil

"Eddy Prend Le Maillot Jaune" (Eddy Takes the Yellow Jersey) is a 1969 song by Pierre-André Gil about the cycling champion Eddy Merckx, inspired by his first victory in the 1969 Tour de France contest. The song was released on the label Monopole. The B-side was called "Mamma Mamma Mia".

== Lyrics ==
The song praises Merckx' talent and victories.

== Chart performance ==
Eddy Prend Le Maillot Jaune entered the ninth place in the Walloon music charts on 9 September 1969. In 1971 Gil would record another song about Merckx named Eddy Est Imbattable!.
