= Da Rich Kidzz =

American hip-hop group

- Origin: Minneapolis, Minnesota, U.S.
- Genres: Hip-hop
- Years active: 2010-2020
- Labels: Profile; ALK Entertainment Group Inc./ Black Ballin Productions, Llc
- Members: Ben on 10, Fly Guy, G-6, Lady J, Frizzy Free, Nasir aka, Jeezy x Tv Sir, Chips and Dame Jones
- Website: http://www.alkentertainmentgroup.com/ (archived)

Da Rich Kidzz were an American hip-hop group from the north side of Minneapolis, Minnesota. The group consisted of eight members between the ages of 10 and 13, including Antwon "Ben on 10" Lymas Jr., Jasonia "Lady J" White, Glentrel "Fly Guy" Carter, Glenn "G-6" Carter, Freeman "Frizzy Free" Hickman, Nasir "Sir" and "Chips". The group was founded on June 2, 2013, but they experienced previous success as part of the group Y.N.RichKids, making music together since early 2010. They first saw national success in the Summer of 2012 when the video for the Y.N.RichKids' smash hit "Hot Cheetos and Takis", went viral with over 7 million views, making it one of the hit songs of summer. Da Rich Kidzz had also picked up an endorsement deal from K-Mart for their 2013 Back-To-School ad campaign, featuring the group's latest single "My Limo".

== Career ==
=== Early success ===
Da Rich Kidzz, featuring some members that were formerly in the Y.N.RichKids, grew up in Minneapolis, Minnesota, with each member participating in the Beats & Rhymes program through the North Community YMCA Youth and Teen Enrichment Center. Their first single "Hot Cheetos and Takis", about the members' favorite snack chips, became an instant viral hit, garnering over 16 million views as of March 2018. It was named #7 on Time magazine "9 Best Music Videos of 2012", and was included in Spin magazine's list of "40 Best Songs of 2012". After the success of the songs, "Hot Cheetos & Takis" and "My Bike", some of the members of the Y.N.RichKids formed their own group, Da Rich Kidzz, and went on to put out the song "Swagg Pac", which has a music video as well. They released the sequel of Y Rap in 2019.

=== Endorsement deal ===
For their 2013 back-to-school ad campaign, K-Mart, sought out some help from the young Minneapolis hip hop group, offering Da Rich Kidzz an opportunity for more national and international exposure. For the back-to-school promotions, K-Mart filmed a full-length music video with the group in Minneapolis, Minnesota, using their latest single "My Limo", about riding the school bus in style. It starting airing on television nationally in the fall of 2013 as 30-second clips of the full-length video that was shot. Ultimately, five commercials were entered into rotation as part if the ad campaign, with K-Mart and Da Rich Kidzz experiencing success as a result. Just days after the video was posted online it had amassed hundreds of thousands of views, with over 2.5 million views to date. Da Rich Kidzz have further plans to continue their relationship with K-Mart, with talks of a new single, "Swagg Pac", and a potential line of merchandise through the retailer they also starred in HBO kids campaign called weird whether.

== Music videos ==
Year	Title	Director(s)
2010	Swagg Pac	-
2013	My Limo	–
2012	Khaki Pants	-
