= Eddy Est Imbattable! =

"Eddy Est Imbattable"
- 7" vinyl single cover

Single by Pierre-André Gil
- B-side: "Eddy Et Claudine"
- Released: 1971
- Genre: Schlager
- Label: Columbia
- Songwriter(s): Luc Verbist, Noël Lambré, Pierre-André Gil

Eddy Est Imbattable! (Eddy Is Undefeatable!) is a 1971 Belgian French-language song by Pierre-André Gil about Belgian cycling champion Eddy Merckx. It was released on the label EMI and had the song Eddy & Claudine as B-side, which is also about Merckx. Claudine Aucou is his wife. Earlier in 1969 Gil had recorded another song about Merckx named Eddy Prend Le Maillot Jaune.

== Lyrics ==
The song praises Merckx as a great and undefeatable champion. The lyrics mention how the previous Belgian cycling champion Rik van Looy "was great too, but has retired now." Roger De Vlaeminck and Frans Verbeeck are given credit as great champions too, but the singer mentions that nowadays "both of them turn pale when they notice Merckx behind them."

== Dutch-language version ==
In 1971 a Dutch-language cover of Eddy Est Imbattable named Eddy Is Niet Te Kloppen! was released, which again had Eddy & Claudine as B-side. It was performed by the group Frankie en de Trillers. It was released on the label Monopole.
