= Colectivo 60 =

Bus line in Buenos Aires, Argentina

Colectivo Line 60
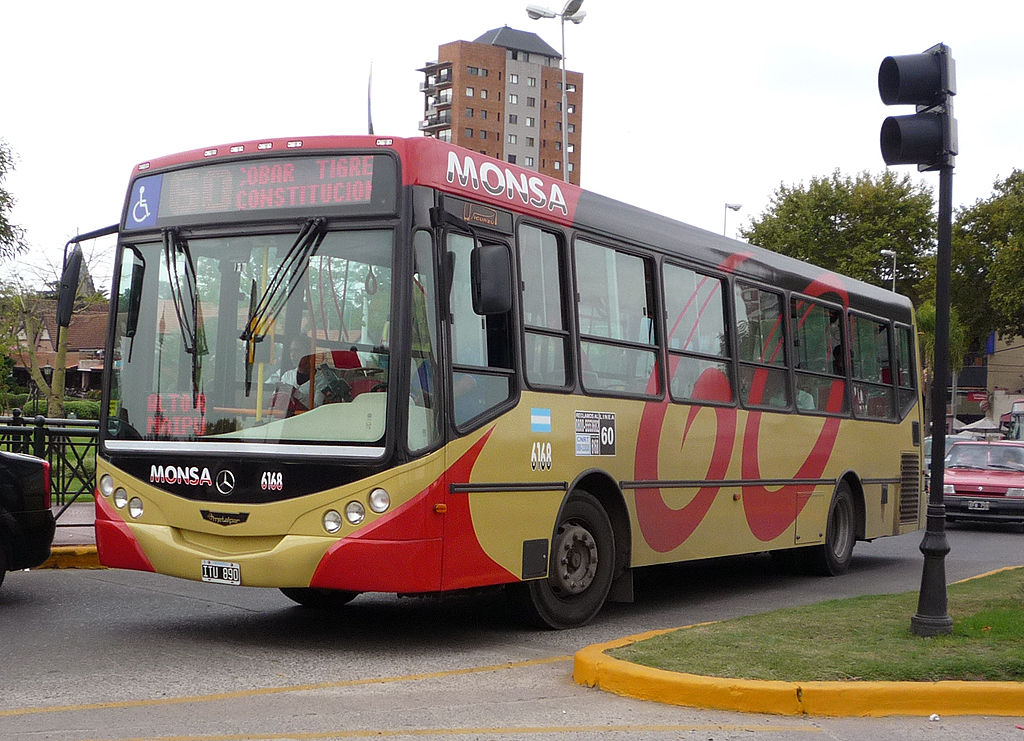
- A Megabus 60 operating in the metropolitan area of Tigre, Buenos Aires.
- Parent: DOTA Group
- Founded: 1931
- Headquarters: Escobar central bus station
- Locale: Buenos Aires metropolitan area
- Service area: Southwestern District of Barracas, Buenos Aires CBD, northwestern Tigre, Buenos Aires and Belén de Escobar
- Service type: Local and express
- Fleet: 400
- Annual ridership: 18,269,034 (2019)
- Fuel type: #2 diesel (all garages)
- Operator: Micro Ómnibus Norte S.A.

60
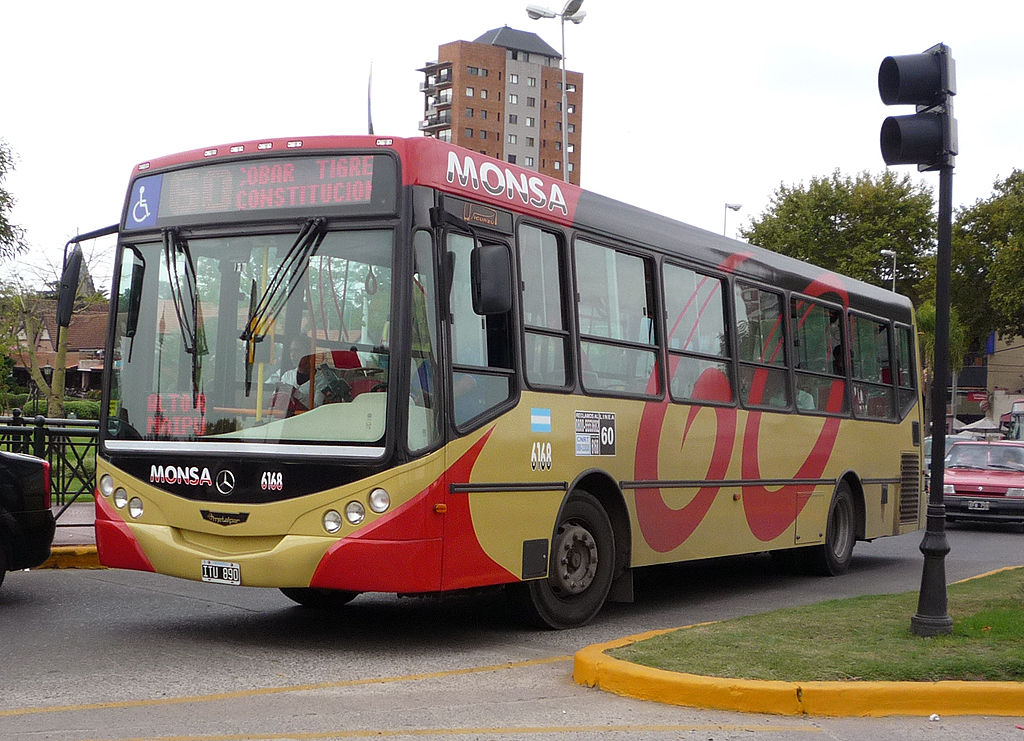

Overview
- Operator: Micro Ómnibus Norte S.A.
- Began service: October 17, 1931 (as route 31)

Route
- Start: Constitución station
- End: Tigre Club

Service
- Ridership: 18,269,034 (2019)

Route 60, known locally as El Sesenta ("The Sixty" in Spanish), runs from Constitución station, in the centre of the city of Buenos Aires, Argentina to the Tigre Club in the partido of Tigre. The service is operated by Micro Ómnibus Norte S.A. (MONSA). Since November 1980, it has also managed the routes of the defunct bus route 38, which are currently provided under the number and colours of bus route 60, being distinguishable from the rest of the line only by the route indicator.

== History ==
The bus route began operations in 1931, formed by three partners: Da Cruz, Capalbo and Delgado Varela. It had 82 vehicles and the innovation of providing services at a stable frequency, 24 hours a day, with uniformed driving staff. Initially this route used the number 31.

In 1933, it became a component company, like many bus companies at that time.

Services were provided between the terminals of Plaza Constitución and Canal San Fernando until 1934, when it obtained a concession from the Province of Buenos Aires, which was ratified in 1940. By virtue of holding this concession, the services of route 60 could not be taken over by the Cooperación de Transportes de la Ciudad de Buenos Aires, which by then had taken over all the bus lines with terminals in Capital Federal.

The company's fleet of vehicles gradually grew as its area of influence expanded, the most socio-economically developed area of Greater Buenos Aires, now expanded to the Metropolitan Area of Buenos Aires.

Successive extensions of routes were added to its original route, with the incorporation of new terminals, such as Rincón de Milberg, General Pacheco, Escobar, Ingeniero Maschwitz, on various routes. Also included in the MONSA family was route 38, which would be absorbed into route 60.

MONSA was originally made up of a system of component partners, mostly Spanish immigrants, who acquired their units and put them into service on the line. At its peak, the company had 200 component partners. However, in mid-2000 this system began to fail when the component partners were unable to bequeath the venture to their families.

The company was also affected, like others, by the bankruptcy of the Belgrano insurance company in 1996, which forced MONSA to face important lawsuits arising from accidents. Among them, the running over of a unit during an uprising on December 3, 1990, in which five people died. The bankruptcy of its insurance company left MONSA in debt for 500 million pesos at the time, for more than 200 lawsuits. This was aggravated by the December 2001 riots in Argentina. In April 2007, the firm MONSA entered into bankruptcy.

In July 2010, after almost 79 years of history, the company sold the majority of its shares to the companies NUDO S.A. (made up of Nuevos Rumbos and the DOTA Group), AZUL S.A.T.A. (dependent on Rosario Bus), which began a process of unit renewal that continues to date. NUDO and Rosario Bus subsequently withdrew from the partnership, leaving the line in the hands of DOTA. This purchase led to a major union conflict, which led to various strikes and even workers going on hunger strike.

In 2015, in the midst of a major conflict between the company and the union, bus route 60 was out of service for 42 days.

== Routing ==
This service is sometimes dubbed El Internacional (The International) because it passes through (or close to) many landmarks of the city and of the northern suburbs, including:

- Boca Juniors Stadium
- Constitución railway station
- Avenida de Mayo
- Liceo Theater
- Argentine National Congress
- Confitería El Molino tea room and the Savoy hotel and ballroom
- Callao y Corrientes commercial district
- Palace of Justice ("Tribunales")
- Obras Sanitarias building, Córdoba y Ayacucho
- University of Buenos Aires complex:

Faculty of Medicine
Faculty of Dentistry
Faculty of Economic Sciences
Faculty of Pharmacy and Biochemistry
Faculty of Social Sciences (Marcelo T. de Alvear branch)
Faculty of Engineering (Las Heras branch)
Hospital de Clínicas "José de San Martín"

- Embassy of Uruguay
- La Recoleta Cemetery
- Recoleta entertainment district
- Automóvil Club Argentino
- Plaza Las Heras
- Rivadavia Hospital
- Fernández Hospital
- Buenos Aires Zoo in Palermo
- Buenos Aires Botanical Garden in Palermo
- SRA exhibition grounds
- Plaza Italia
- United States embassy
- Pacífico train station
- Hipódromo Argentino
- Military hospital
- Barrancas de Belgrano park and transportation hub
- Barrio Chino
- River Plate Stadium
- Cabildo y Juramento (Belgrano high street)
- Cabildo y Congreso (terminal of the subte D line)
- Saavedra bridge
- Olivos city centre
- C.A. Platense Stadium
- San Isidro hospital (San Isidro Partido)
- San Isidro racetrack
- San Isidro cathedral (San Isidro cathedral)
- Tigre stadium (Tigre Partido)
- Tigre fruit market
- Tigre tourism centre (gateway to the Paraná Delta).

One branch of the service reaches Tigre via the Pan-American Highway.

== See also ==
- Transportation in Argentina
- Colectivo
