= Constitución railway station =

Major railway station in Buenos Aires

Coordinates: 34°37′39″S 58°22′50″W

Plaza Constitución
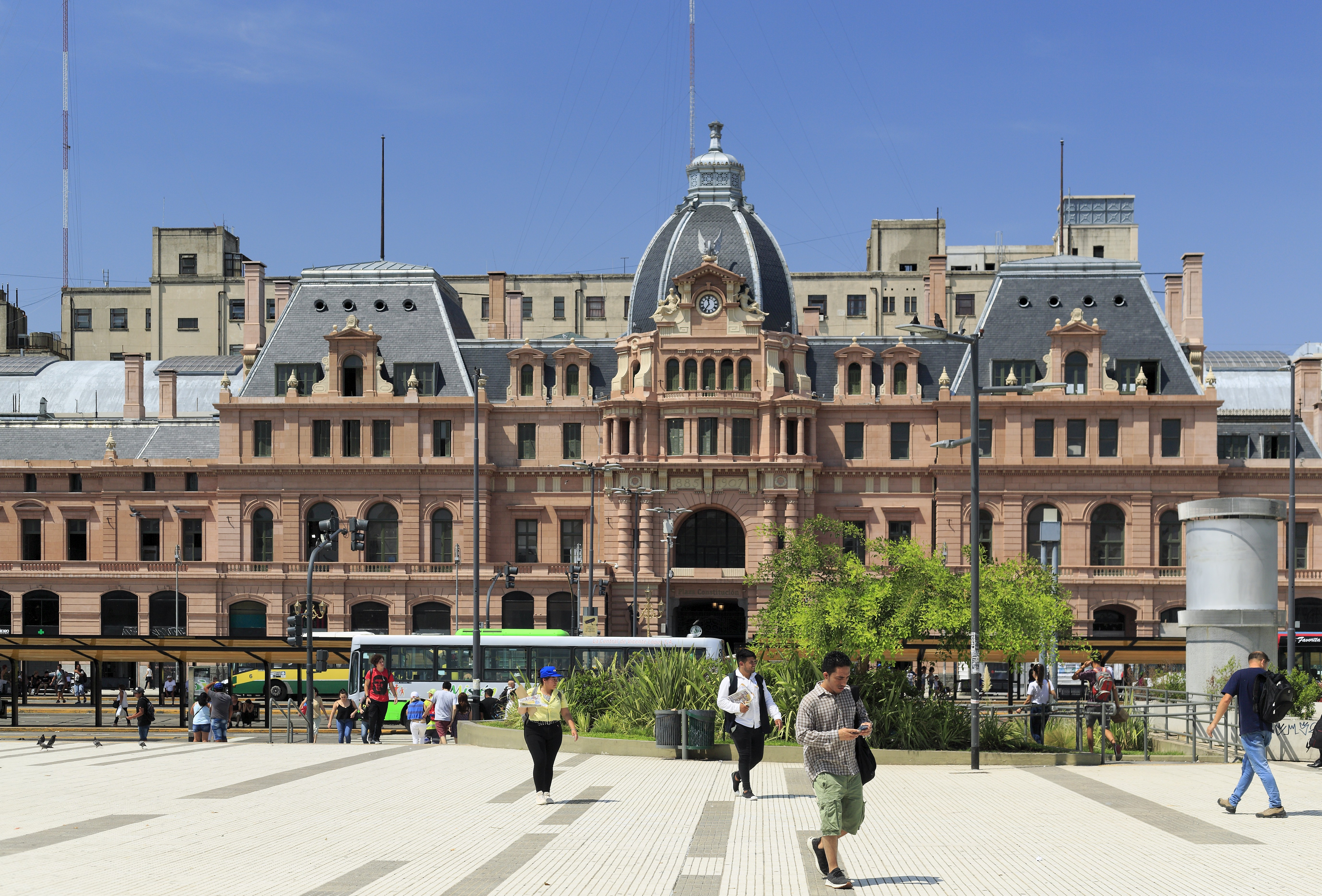
- The station from Plaza de la Constitución

General information
- Location: Av. Brasil 1128, Constitución, Buenos Aires; Argentina
- System: Commuter and inter-city rail
- Owner: Government of Argentina
- Operator: Trenes Argentinos
- Lines: Roca; Belgrano Sur (under construction)
- Connections: Underground

Construction
- Platform levels: 16

History
- Opened: 1865; 161 years ago
- Electrified: Overhead line
Location
- Location within Buenos Aires Location within Argentina

Constitución railway station (Spanish: Estación Constitución) is a major railway station in Constitución, a barrio in central Buenos Aires, Argentina. The full official name of the station is Estación Plaza Constitución (in English: Constitution Square Station) reflecting the fact that the station is located opposite Constitution Square, two kilometers to the south of the Obelisco landmark. The ground floor of the station has fourteen tracks and the floor below has two tracks for the Buenos Aires Underground. It serves as the South terminal for the city (with Retiro and Once stations as the North and West terminals respectively).

In 2021, the station received the heritage designation of National Historic Monument.

== History ==
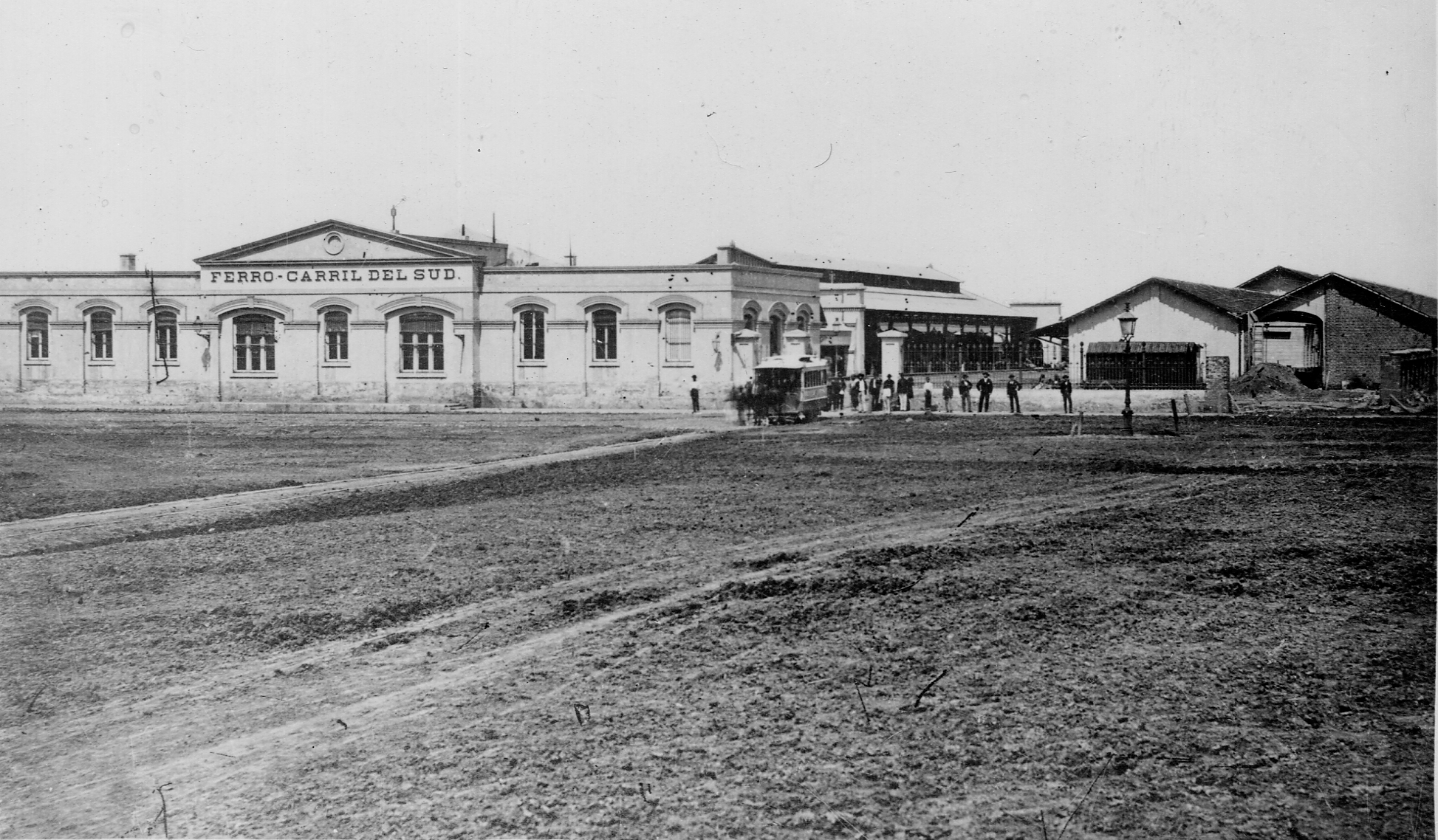
The first Constitución railway station, opened in 1865, and the tram that connected it with the center (1867)

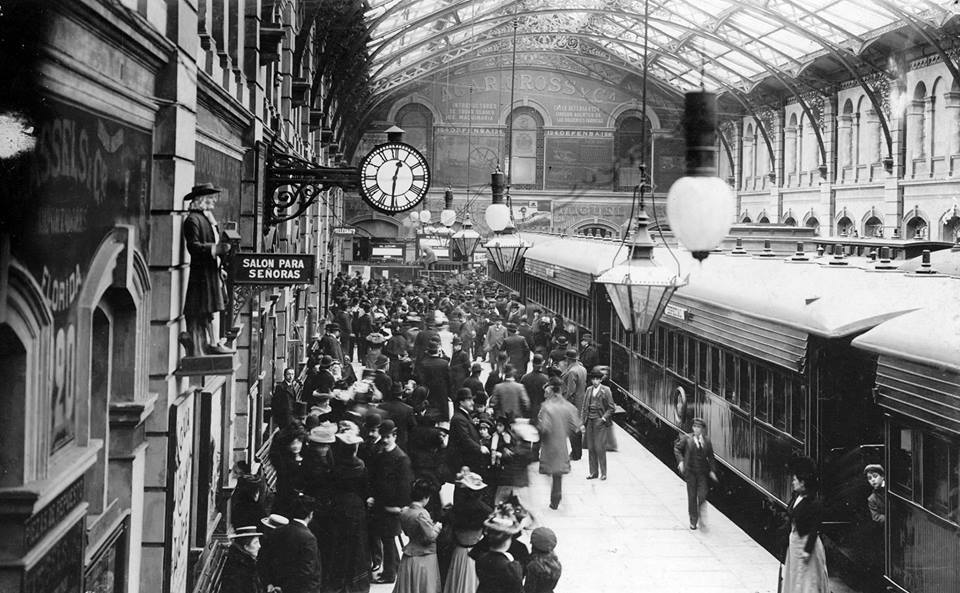
President Carlos Pellegrini at the station in 1900.

On 7 March 1864, in a ceremony attended by the president Bartolomé Mitre, construction began at Mercado Constitución, on the site of the present day terminus, as the British-owned Buenos Aires Great Southern railway company began building its first broad gauge (5 ft 6 in) line of 114 km as far as Chascomús. The first section of the line to Jeppener, Buenos Aires, was opened on 14 August 1865; during that same month a small terminal station at Mercado Constitución was opened to the public and renamed Plaza Constitución. Later that year in December the line to Chascomús was opened.

This first building, known as "Constitución I", was a simple construction whose façade was on the current Brazil Street, facing the Mercado Constitución. Public access entered from one side. This primitive terminal had only two platforms: one for arrivals and one for departure of trains.

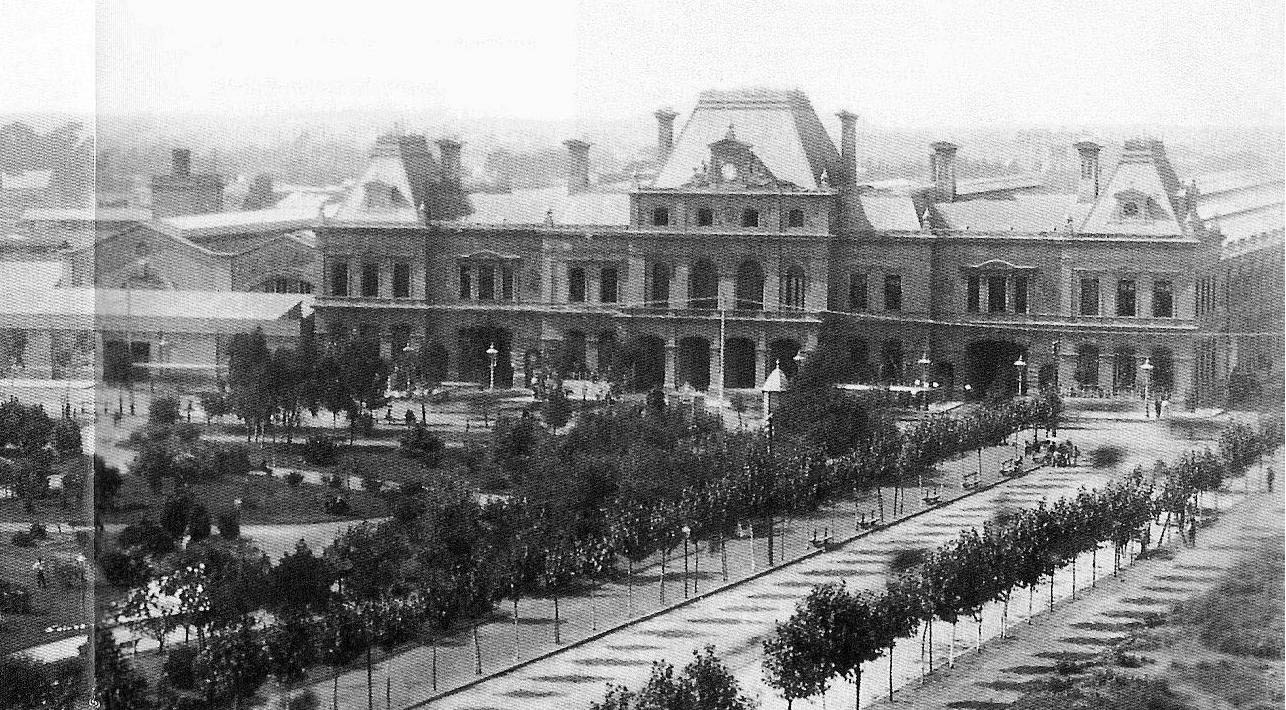
The second terminal in the 1890s

Between 1885 and 1887 the Plaza Constitución terminus was rebuilt and enlarged and between 1906 and 1907 further building work was carried out and extra platforms were added to cope with the increasing suburban traffic. In 1912 yet more platforms were added.

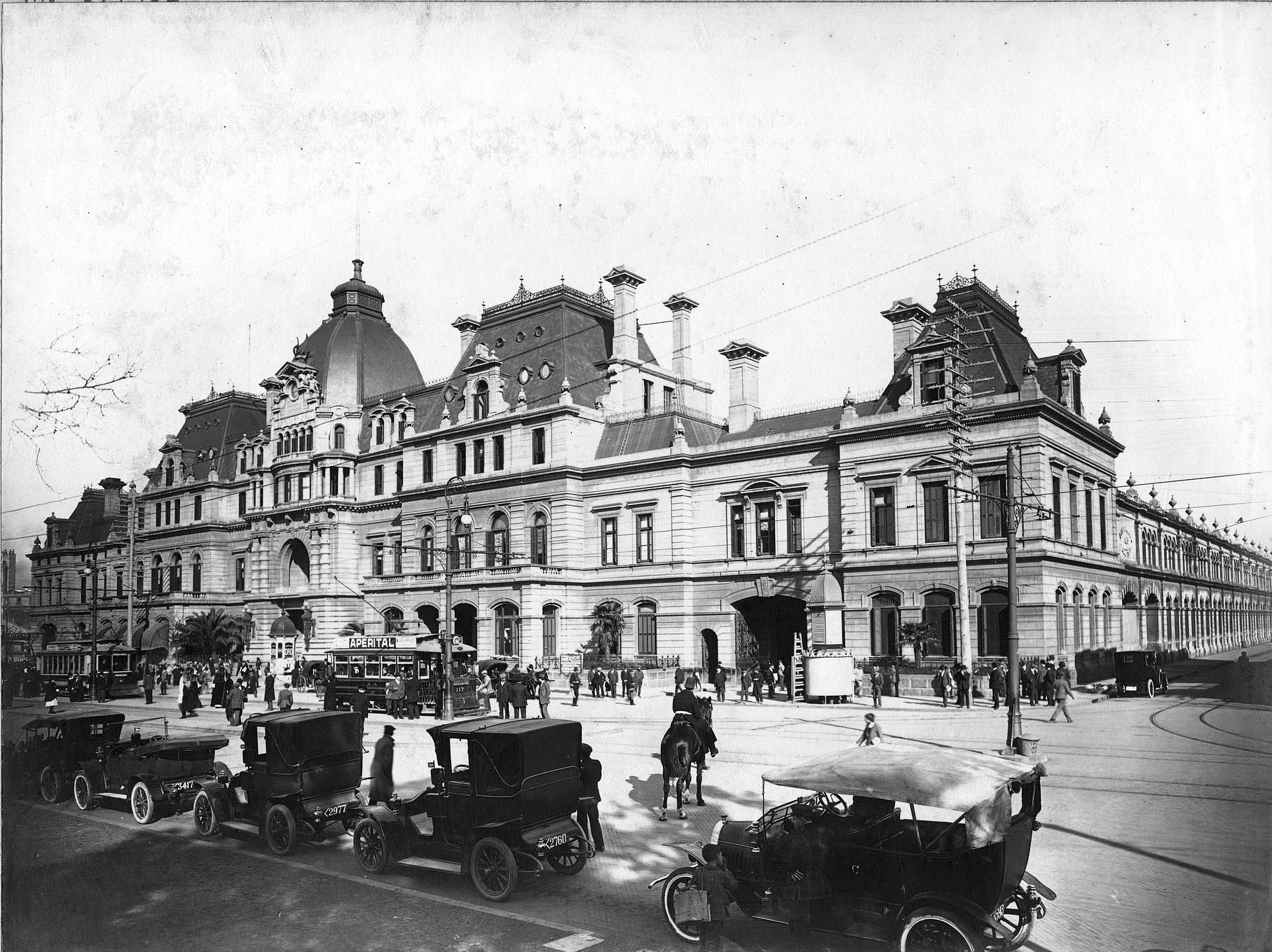
The third terminal c. 1920s

On 19 September 1925 a foundation stone for the present day terminus was laid by the Prince of Wales, later Duke of Windsor, during his official visit to Argentina. The original station was then rebuilt with fourteen platforms roofed over, modern hydraulic buffer stops and an imposing concourse which formed a massive main hall, one of the largest in the world, along the entire length of the site. Of the fourteen platforms, only two or three were normally used for mainline trains, leaving the rest for suburban services. To the east of the main station a large goods and parcels section with warehouses, offices and several sidings was built. The street frontage of the original station was left untouched due to financial constraints imposed towards the end of the rebuilding.

The station was the site of a riot on May 16, 2007, during the evening rush hour, which provoked debate and discussion in Argentina about railway privatisation. A crowded train broke down within walking distance of the station blocking the railway and the irate passengers from trains trapped at the station, after waiting for the train to be fixed and to move, walked to the platform, thus triggering the chaos. Around 25 people were injured, and a total of 16 were arrested and later released.

== Operation ==
Interior of Constitución railway station.

All southbound trains on the Roca Line have their terminus at Constitución and the station is served by Trenes Argentinos, the national train operator which provides commuter services through the Roca Line to the nearby city of La Plata and to the surrounding suburbs of Buenos Aires.

Trenes Argentinos also operates long-distance services throughout much of Buenos Aires Province on the General Roca Railway, formerly operated by defunct company Ferrobaires. Major destinations include Mar del Plata, Miramar, and Bahía Blanca, with connecting services further south to Carmen de Patagones.

Constitución is accessible by the Line C of the Buenos Aires Underground and by numerous public bus services (including the colectivo 60 service), and by long-distance bus services. From 1944 to 1966, it was also served by Line E with a station there, however this was closed when the line was re-routed further towards the centre of the city. In the future, the station will also serve as the terminus for Line F which began construction in 2015.

The surrounding neighbourhood - part of Neighbourhood of Constitución - is characterised by low-rent residences for people from the provinces (or from neighbouring Paraguay and Bolivia) who come to work in the city.

=== Historic operators ===
Operator	Period
(United Kingdom) Buenos Aires Great Southern Railway	1865–1948
(Argentina) Ferrocarriles Argentinos	1948–1991
(Argentina) FEMESA (Note: Temporary operator prior to the privatization of commuter rail services.)	1991–94
(Argentina) Metropolitano	1995–2007
(Argentina) UGOFE (Note: Temporary operator after the Government revoked concession to Metropolitano.)	2005–2014
(Argentina) Argentren	2014–2015
(Argentina) Trenes Argentinos Operaciones	2015–present

== In media ==
Several films have been filmed at the station, the most important of which are There Be Dragons and On Probation. Also several novels take place in the station and its surroundings.

== Gallery ==
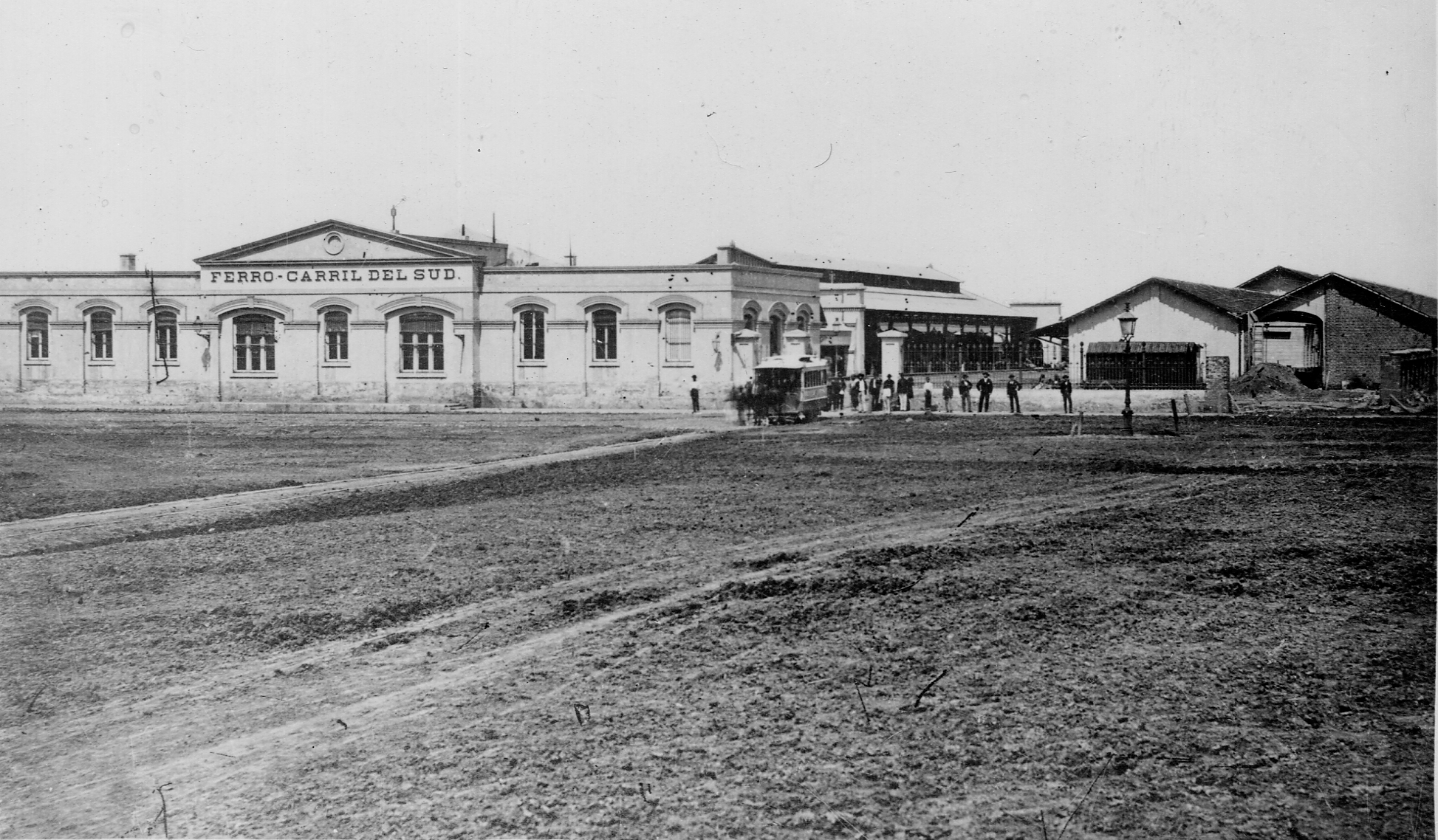
The first Constitución railway station in 1867

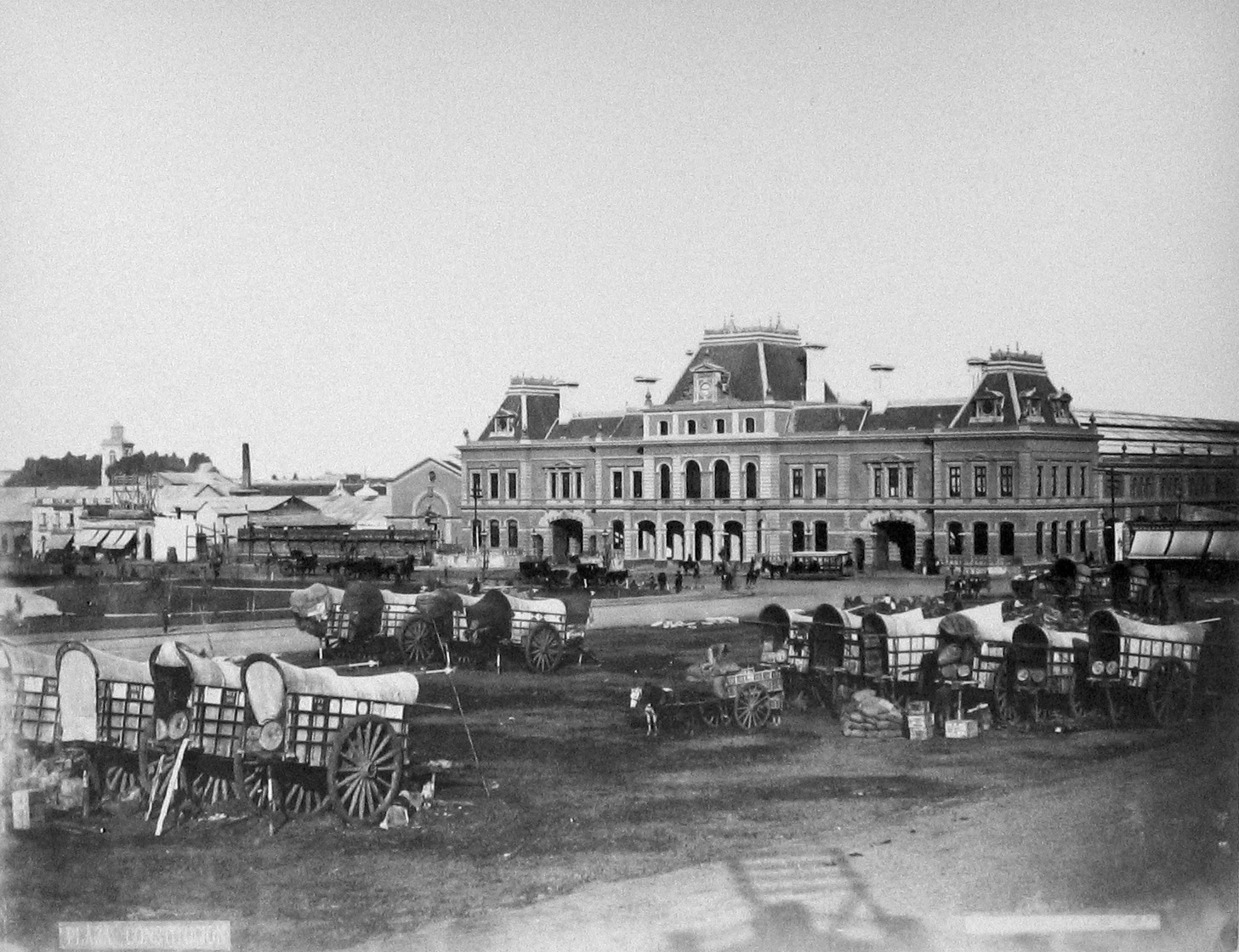
The Plaza Constitución and the second railway station in 1885

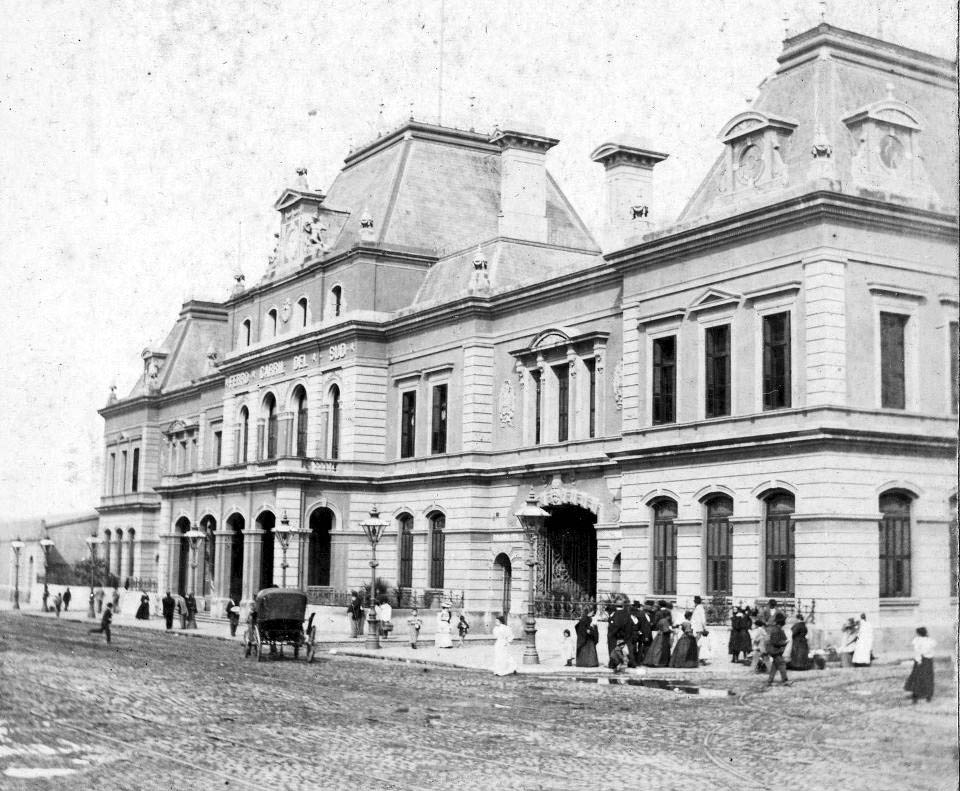
Facade of the second station, c. 1890

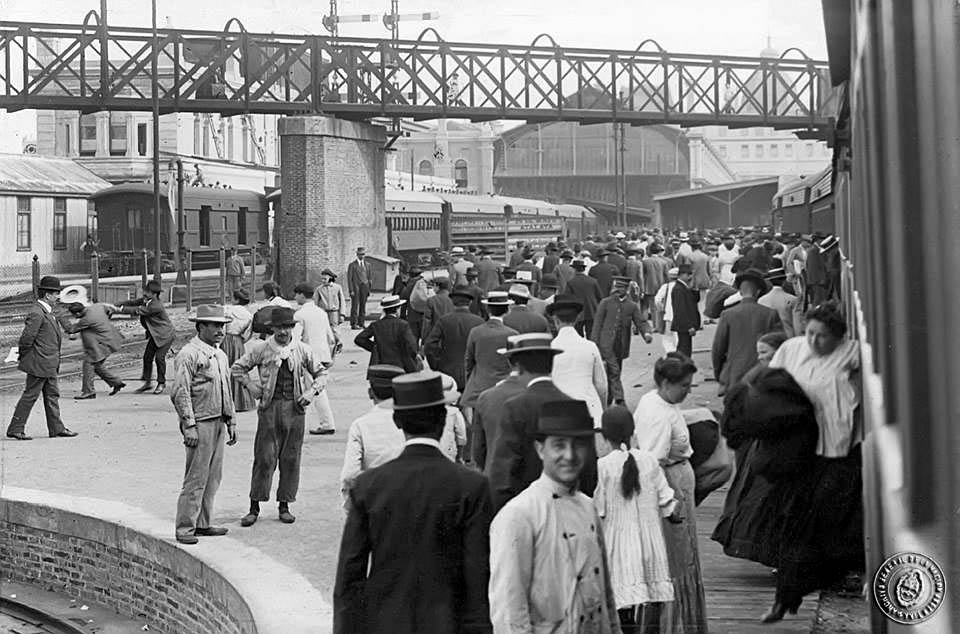
The station in 1912

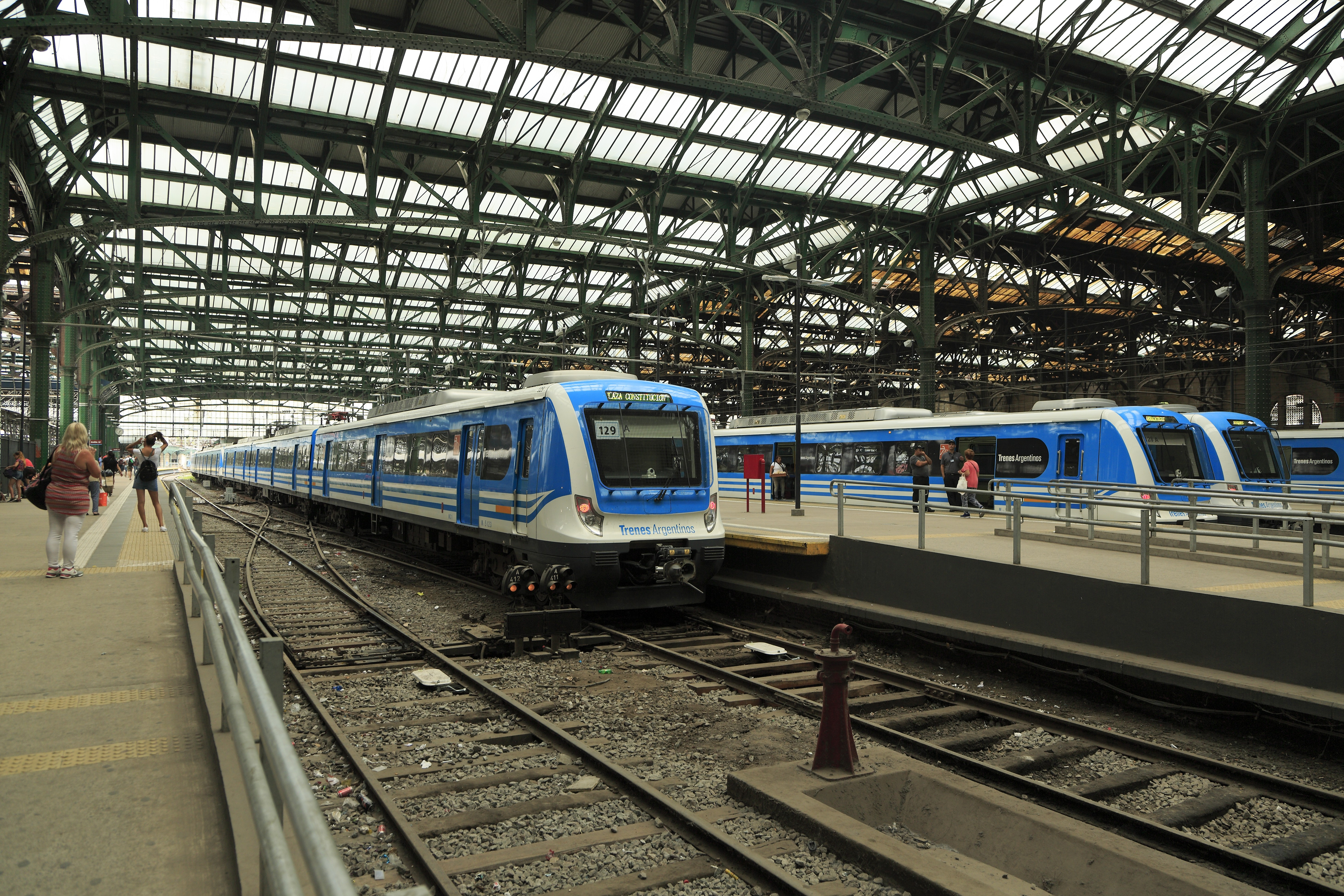
Platforms and formations

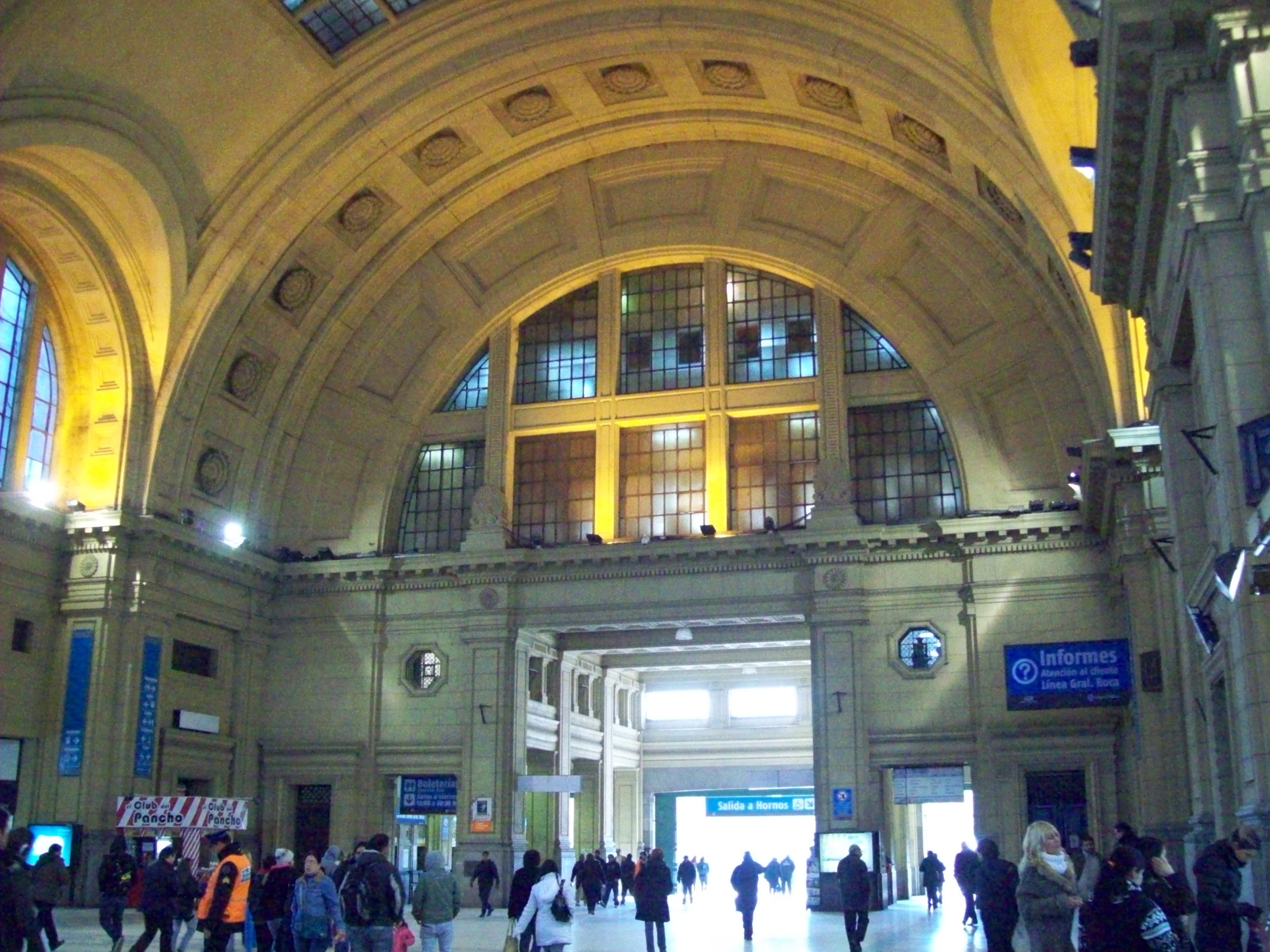
Central hall, 2014

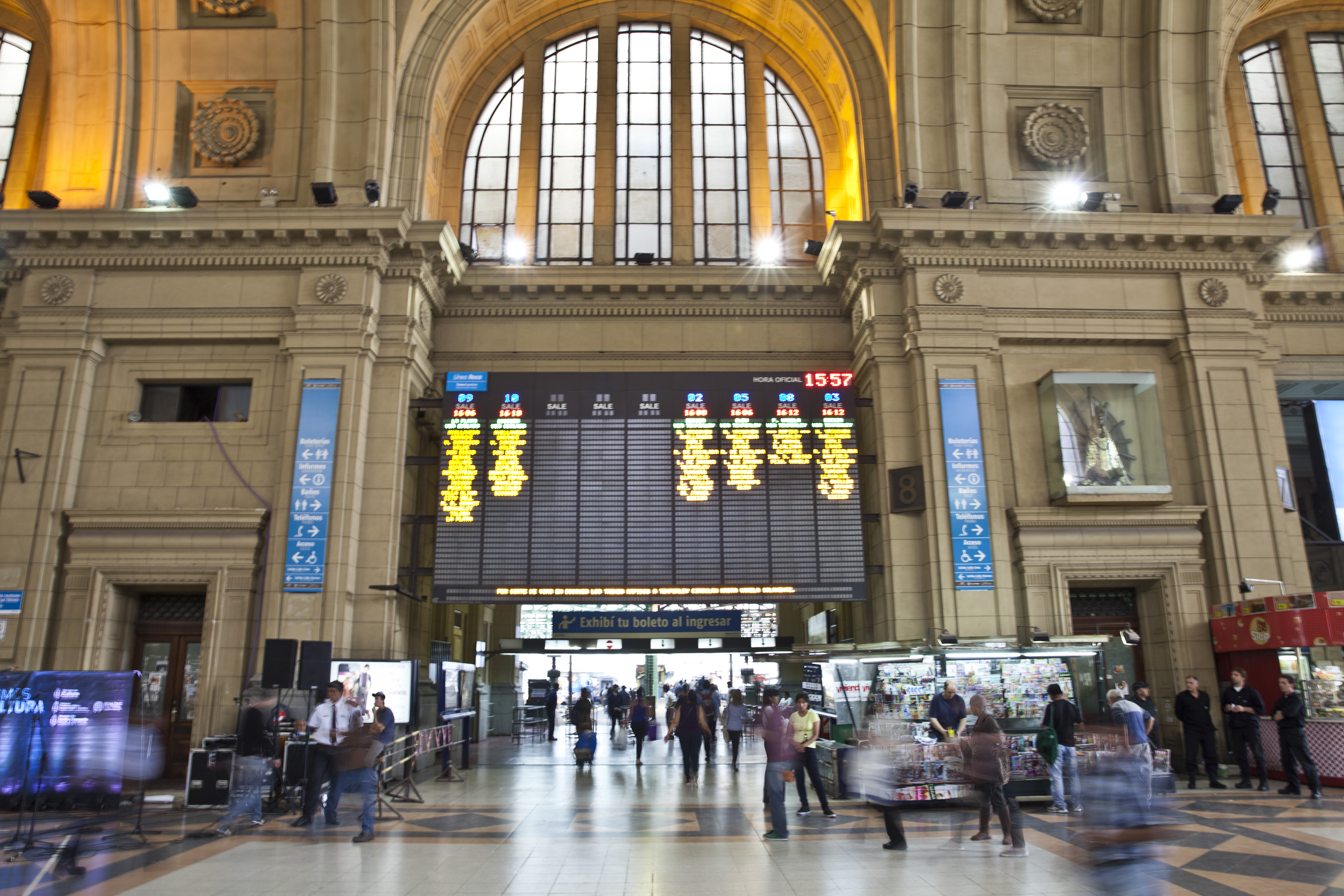
Main hall, 2014

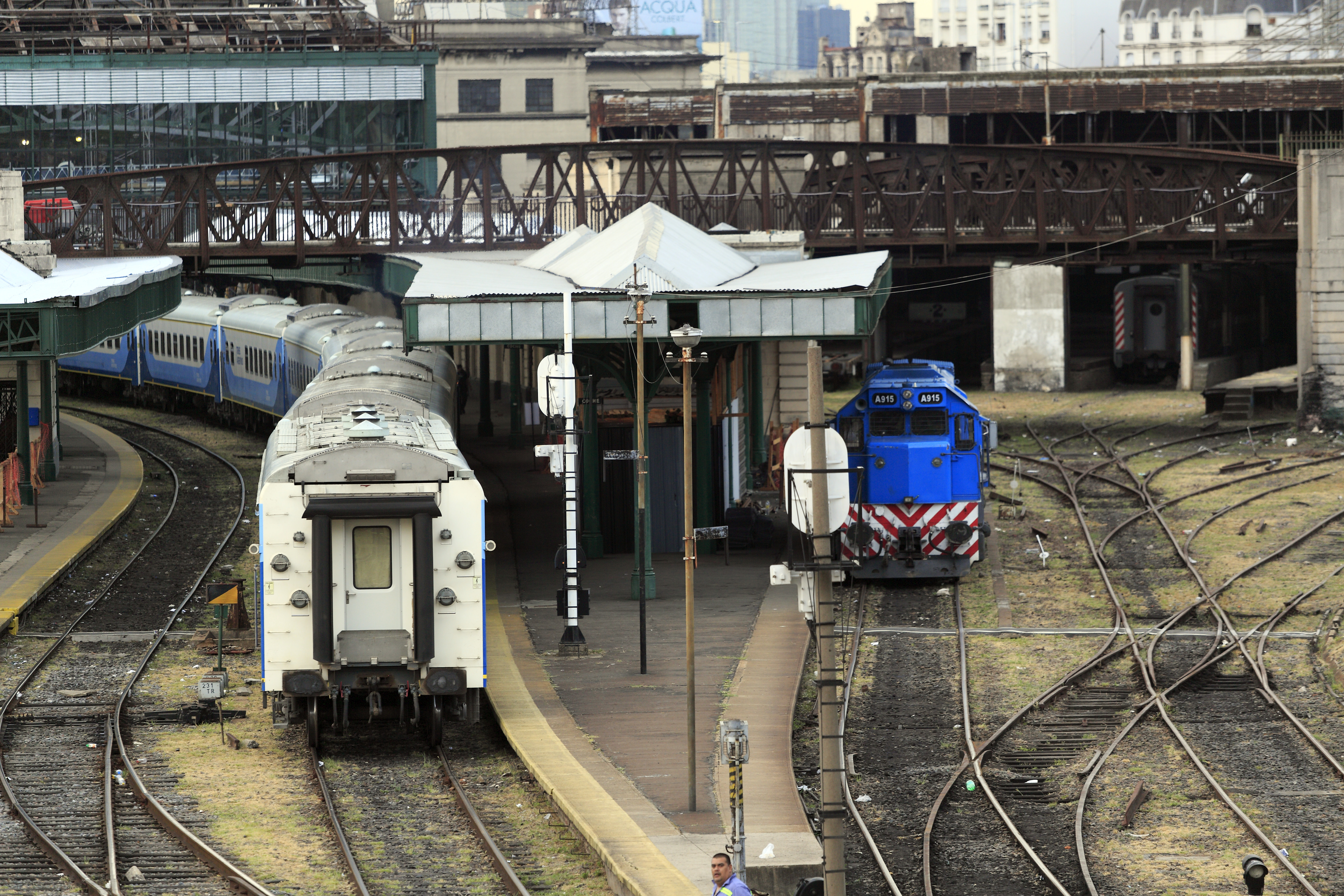
North view, 2018

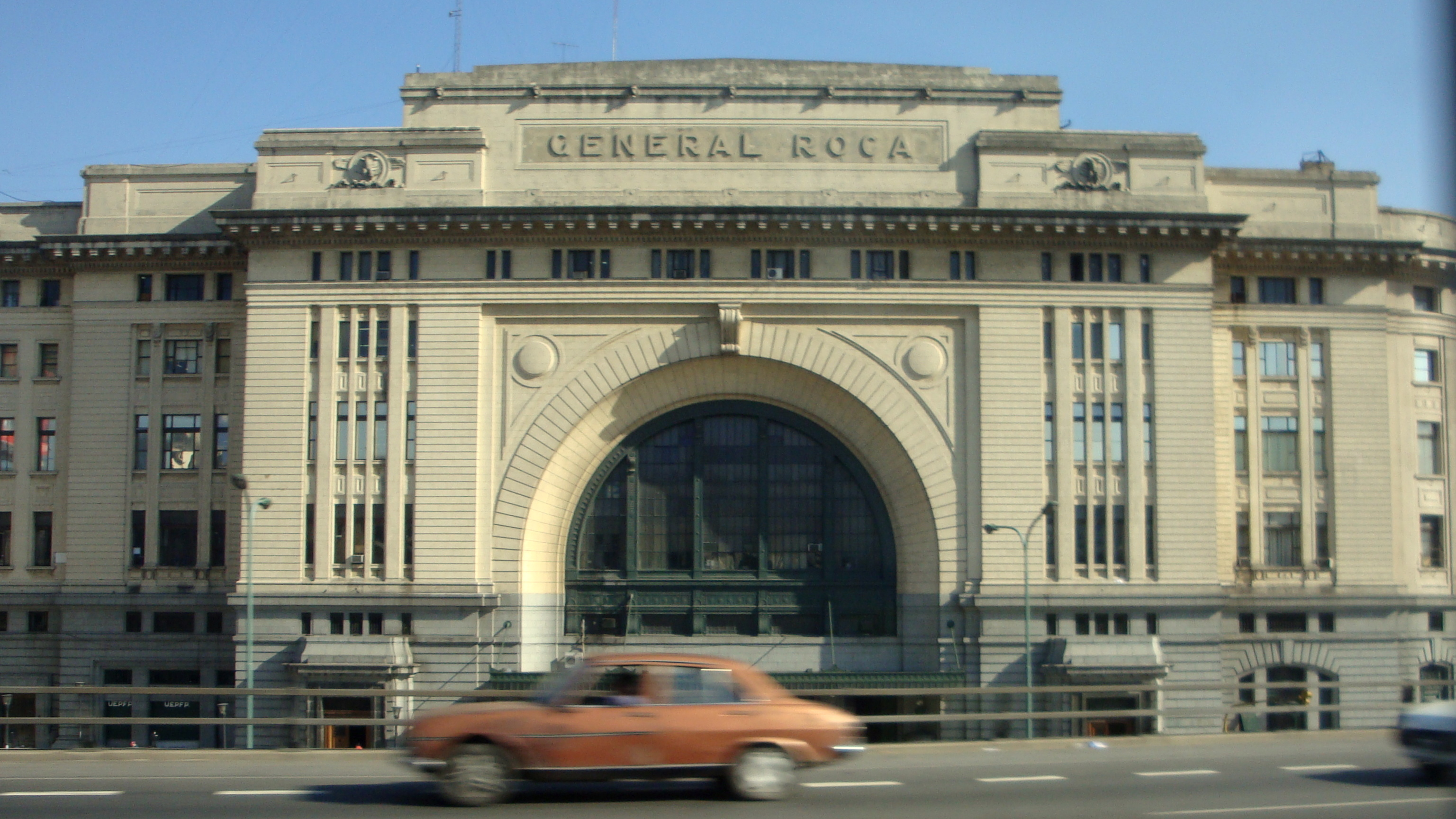
East entrance.

== See also ==
- Constitución - Line C underground station
- Constitución - Line E underground ghost station
- Line F (Buenos Aires Underground) - planned line that will also connect to the station

== Bibliography ==
- H.R.Stones, British Railways in Argentina 1860-1948, P.E.Waters & Associates, Bromley, Kent, England, 1993.
- D.S.Purdom, British Steam on the Pampas, Mechanical Engineering Publications Ltd, London, 1977.
