= Dota (singer) =

Dota Kehr
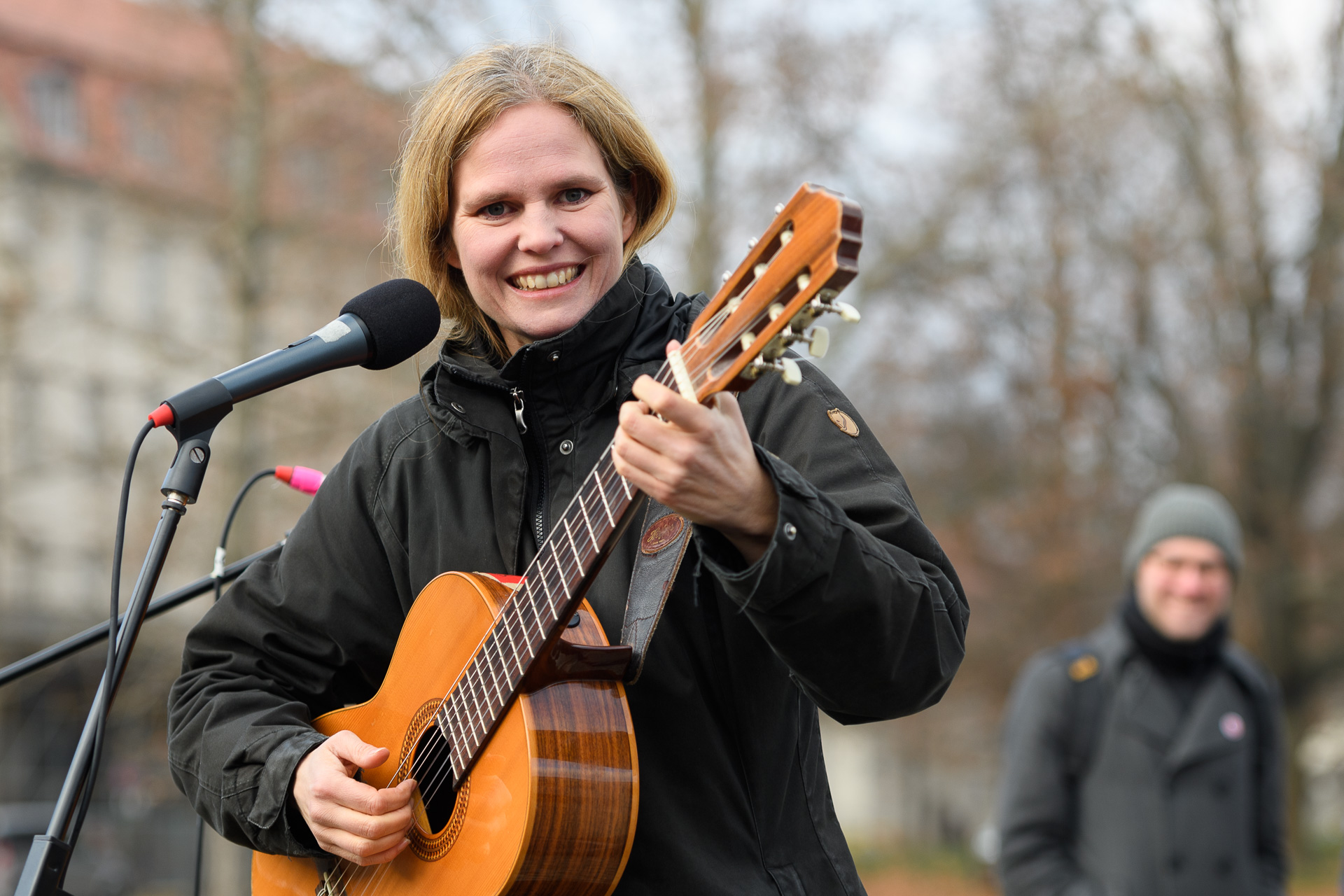
- Kehr in 2019

Background information
- Also known as: Dota Kehr, Kleingeldprinzessin
- Born: Dorothea Kehr; September 14, 1979 (age 47)
- Origin: Berlin, Germany
- Occupation: singer-songwriter
- Years active: 2003–present
- Label: Kleingeldprinzessin Rec.
- Member of: Dota und die Stadtpiraten
- Website: kleingeldprinzessin.de

Dota Kehr (born Dorothea Kehr; German pronunciation: [doʁoˈteːa ˈkeːɐ̯], born 1979; also known as Kleingeldprinzessin) is a singer-songwriter from Berlin and the leader of the musical group Dota und die Stadtpiraten ("Urban Pirates") who writes and performs music influenced by bossa nova and jazz. Her records have been self-published on her own Kleingeldprinzessin Records (Pocket-Change Princess Records) label and distributed by Broken Silence. In October 2006, she performed five concerts in Russia upon the invitation of the Goethe Institute and in the spring of 2009 she toured New Zealand.

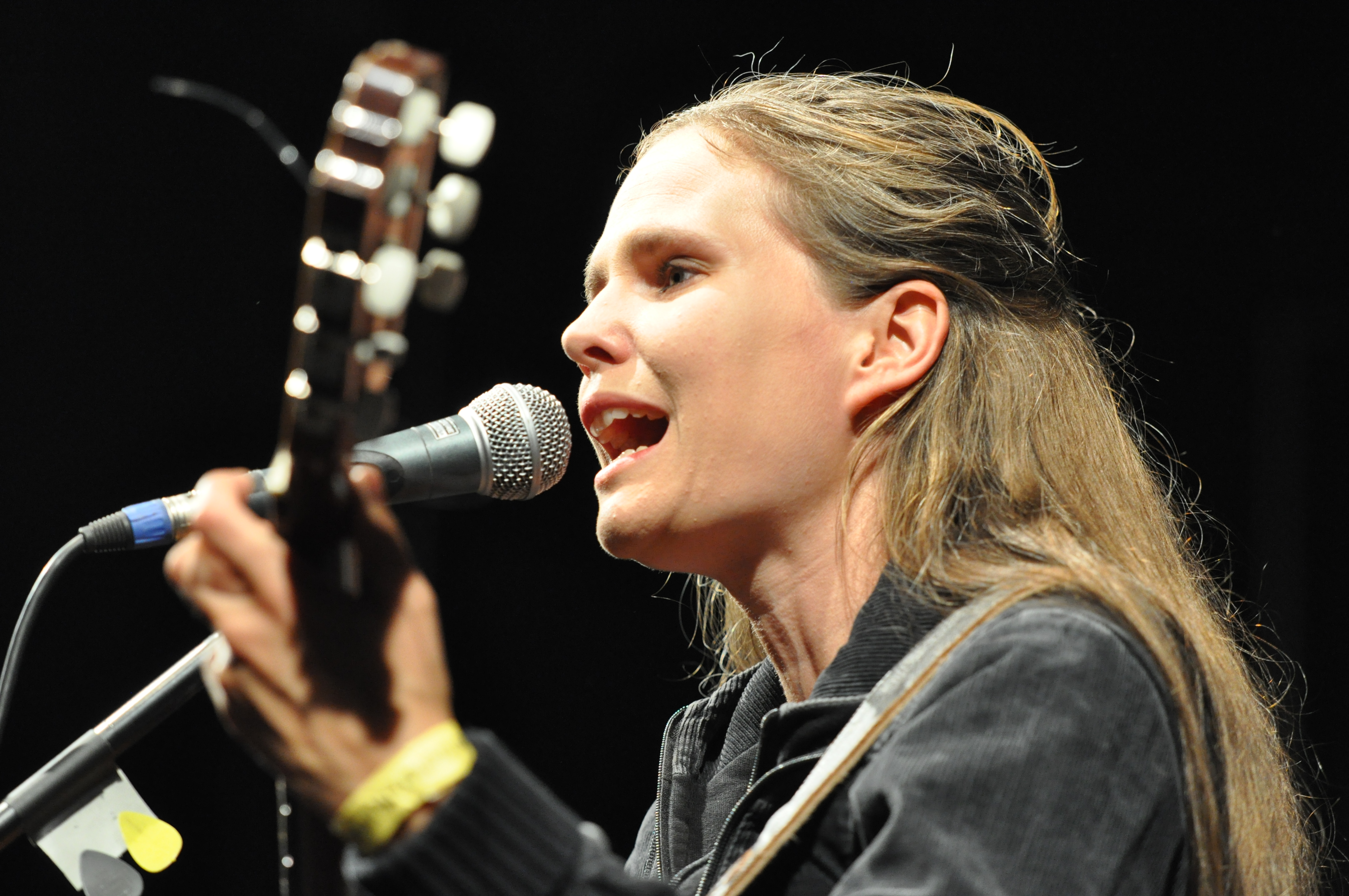
Dota Kehr 2014 at the Nuremberg Bardentreffen festival

== Personal and professional life ==
Kehr grew up in the Berlin neighborhoods of Ruhleben, Zehlendorf und Schöneberg. As a child she played the saxophone and at 14 started performing in the public markets. Only at 21 did she begin to learn to play the guitar. She then went on to gain experience with street music, and because of this she was known by her artist name of Kleingeldprinzessin (Pocket-Change Princess). Her early work was influenced by bossa nova. Her love of South American music came from her childhood, especially a cassette left behind by a Brazilian babysitter: Elis & Tom (Elis Regina and Tom Jobim, 1974).

Kehr studied medicine in Berlin and graduated in 2010, but went on to live and record music in Brazil and Ecuador.

The 2010 album Bis auf den Grund (Down to the Bottom) starts to show strong influence from folk rock music and elements of jazz.

Kehr has two children, born in 2011 and 2013.

== Discography ==
- Kleingeldprinzessin (2003)
- Mittelinselurlaub (2003)
- Taschentöne – live (2004)
- Blech + Plastik (2005)
- Immer nur Rosinen (2006)
- In anderen Räumen – live (2008)
- Schall und Schatten (2009)
- Bis auf den Grund (2010)
- Solo Live (2011)
- Das große Leuchten (2011)
- Wo soll ich suchen (2013)
- Keine Gefahr (2016)
- Überall Konfetti – live (2016)
- Die Freiheit (2018)
- Kaléko (2020)
- Wir Rufen Dich, Galaktika (2021)
- Einfach So Verloren (2021)
- De repente fortaleza (2024; with Danilo Guilherme alias Dan)
- Der Regen (2026)

== Sources ==
- taz, 2. April 2004 (Berlin lokal, S. 28)
- Berliner Zeitung, 28. September 2006 (Lokales, S. 28)
- Tagesspiegel Online, 26. September 2006
- Deutschlandradio Kultur, 20. December 2006
