= List of works by Francisco Salamone =

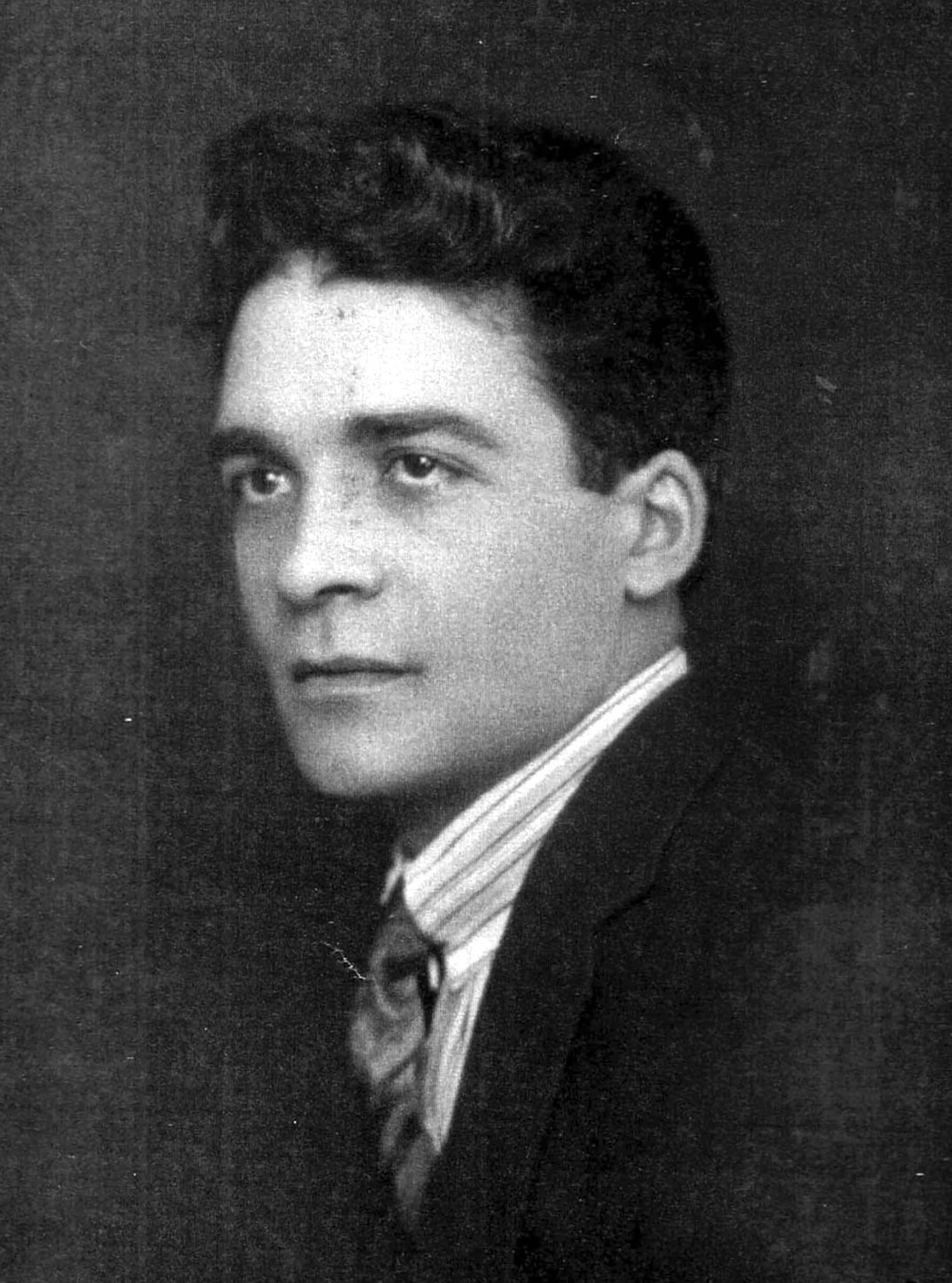
Francisco Salamone c. 1930

Francisco Salamone (1897–1959) was an Italian Argentine architect known for designing, in just four years, more than 60 buildings in the Buenos Aires Province, mainly in Art Deco and Futurist styles. He began his work in 1933 in the city of Villa María, Córdoba doing road paving works, a slaughterhouse and the Centenario Square. In 1935 a new mayor was elected that started solving the municipal deficit by ending public works and accusing the former mayor of embezzlement, this led Salamone to relocate to Buenos Aires Province. There, he met the provincial governor, Manuel Fresco of the National Democratic Party. Fresco embarked in big public works projects, which were expected to encourage the growth of small towns and cities. He entrusted Salamone with the task of constructing different public buildings in the humid pampas, giving him full powers and funding.

The majority of his work consisted of three types of constructions: city halls, cemetery gates and slaughterhouses. He also made squares, porticos, sidewalks, lamp poles, urban furniture and furniture of the municipal palaces. During this period he only built two private homes.

When Fresco was removed from power in 1940 by a federal intervention, Salamone moved with his family to Buenos Aires City. In 1943 he had to go into exile in Uruguay after being accused of corruption in a road paving work in San Miguel de Tucumán. After the charges were withdrawn, he returned to Argentina where he directed multiple urban road paving works and only worked on two buildings of rationalist style, a private house, and a new wing for a private school.

== Buildings ==
Buildings
Work	Image	City	Departamento/ Partido (Note: In Argentina the territorial divisions of second order are called partidos in the Buenos Aires and departamentos in the other provinces.)	Province	Address Coordinates	Construction	Notes	Ref.
Adolfo Alsina City Hall	Adolfo Alsina City Hall	Carhué	Adolfo Alsina	Buenos Aires	Carlos Pellegrini and Rivadavia; 37.18033°S 62.76124°W	1937–3 December 1938	The 36-metre (118 ft)-high tower is one of the most complex reinforced concrete towers built by Salamone.	
Adolfo Gonzales Chaves City Hall	Adolfo Gonzales Chaves City Hall	Adolfo Gonzales Chaves	Adolfo Gonzales Chaves	Buenos Aires	Mitre and J. Elicagaray; 38.03259°S 60.09843°W	1939	Standing out for its curved balcony and concrete buttresses that frame the entrance.	
Adolfo Gonzales Chaves Municipal Market	Adolfo Gonzales Chaves Municipal Market	Adolfo Gonzales Chaves	Adolfo Gonzales Chaves	Buenos Aires	Sarmiento 158; 38.03281°S 60.09718°W	1937–1939	Currently "Gerogina Valdez de Lafargue Cultural Center"	
Adolfo Gonzales Chaves Slaughterhouse	Adolfo Gonzales Chaves Slaughterhouse	Adolfo Gonzales Chaves	Adolfo Gonzales Chaves	Buenos Aires	38.04315°S 60.07993°W	1938	Currently "Frigorífico Chaves"	
Alberdi Municipal Delegation	Alberdi Municipal Delegation	Alberdi	Leandro N. Alem	Buenos Aires	34.43888°S 61.81153°W	1937	Municipal offices for the Leandro N. Alem Partido	
Alberdi Slaughterhouse	Alberdi Slaughterhouse	Alberdi	Leandro N. Alem	Buenos Aires	34.44866°S 61.82997°W	1937	Currently abandoned	
Alberti City Hall	Alberti City Hall	Alberti	Alberti	Buenos Aires	9 de Julio and Leandro N. Alem; 35.03129°S 60.28133°W	1937–1938	Curved balconies on the lower part that contrast with the sharp balconies in the tower.	
Alberti Social Club	Alberti Social Club	Alberti	Alberti	Buenos Aires	Leandro N. Alem 151–199; 35.03197°S 60.28086°W	1937	Remodeling of the old municipality to Social Club. Then became the Rural Normal School and now it is the Secondary School Nº2 Pablo A. Pizzurno.	
Alem Municipal Delegation	Alem Municipal Delegation	Alem	Leandro N. Alem	Buenos Aires	Roldán and Layera; 34.51962°S 61.39038°W	1937	Currently a first aid room	
Alem Slaughterhouse	Alem Slaughterhouse	Alem	Leandro N. Alem	Buenos Aires	34.52585°S 61.39869°W	1937	Currently abandoned	
Apartment Building	Apartment building entrance	Vicente López (Note: The town of Vicente López covers the whole partido of the same name.)		Buenos Aires	Zufriategui 637; 34.53439°S 58.46645°W	1950	Private apartment building	
Apartment Building	Apartment Building in Buenos Aires City	Buenos Aires City	— (Note: The City of Buenos Aires is autonomous and does not belong to any province.)		Ayacucho and Alvear; 34.58747°S 58.38917°W	1950	Private apartment building	
Azul Cemetery	Azul Cemetery	Azul	Azul	Buenos Aires	Sarmiento and Necochea; 36.77376°S 59.85133°W	1938	22-metre (72 ft)-high concrete building in which RIP is printed in black marble, serves as a backdrop to the intimidating Avenging Angel. Built by Sociedad Anónima de Obras Públicas.	
Azul Slaughterhouse	Azul Slaughterhouse	Azul	Azul	Buenos Aires	36.80794°S 59.82488°W	1938	Currently Azul Beekeepers Center. The tower rises 18 metres (59 ft) crowned with a huge blade. Built by Sociedad Anónima de Obras Públicas.	
Balcarce Cemetery	Balcarce Cemetery	Balcarce	Balcarce	Buenos Aires	37.87213°S 58.24599°W	1936	The wall presents a symmetrical design that emphasizes the cross of the central gate, with architectural details such as buttresses and battlements. Built by José E. Licciardi.	
Balcarce Slaughterhouse	Balcarce Slaughterhouse	Balcarce	Balcarce	Buenos Aires	37.83187°S 58.27327°W	1937	Currently Salamone Cultural Center. The design of the slaughterhouse combines pure elemental forms and platonic solids, with a tiny New York Art Deco skyscraper. Built by José E. Licciardi.	
Bonifacio Municipal Delegation	Bonifacio Municipal Delegation	Bonifacio	Guaminí	Buenos Aires	36.80738°S 62.2466°W	1937	Municipal offices for the Guaminí Partido in Spanish Colonial Revival style	
Cacharí Municipal Delegation	Cacharí Municipal Delegation	Cacharí, Buenos Aires	Azul	Buenos Aires	Belgrano 1663; 36.37694°S 59.50504°W	1937	Municipal offices for the Azul Partido	
Cacharí Slaughterhouse	Cacharí Slaughterhouse	Cacharí, Buenos Aires	Azul	Buenos Aires	36.36654°S 59.49838°W	1937	Currently abandoned	
Carlos Calegari House	Carlos Calegari House	Alberti	Alberti	Buenos Aires	Sarmiento 112; 35.03271°S 60.27651°W	1937	Private house	
Casbas Municipal Delegation	Casbas Municipal Delegation	Casbas	Guaminí	Buenos Aires	36.75716°S 62.50382°W	1937	Municipal offices for the Guaminí Partido in Spanish Colonial Revival style	
Cemetery Morgue	Cemetery Morgue	Alberti	Alberti	Buenos Aires	Poeta Barbieri and Ceferino Ferreyra Basso; 35.043188°S 60.299150°W	1937	Currently a storage room	
Chascomús City Hall	Chascomús City Hall	Chascomús	Chascomús	Buenos Aires	Cramer 270; 35.57841°S 58.01389°W	1940	Due to a municipal law the City Hall was built in a Spanish Colonial Revival style.	
Chillar Municipal Delegation	Chillar Municipal Delegation	Chillar	Azul	Buenos Aires	García 66; 37.31349°S 59.98486°W	1937	Municipal offices for the Azul Partido	
Chillar Slaughterhouse	Chillar Slaughterhouse	Chillar	Azul	Buenos Aires	37.30815°S 59.99878°W	1937	Currently abandoned	
Coronel Mom Municipal Delegation	Coronel Mom Municipal Delegation	Coronel Mom	Alberti	Buenos Aires	Suipacha 245; 34.844392°S 60.305749°W	1937	Municipal offices for the Alberti Partido	
Coronel Pringles City Hall	Coronel Pringles City Hall	Coronel Pringles	Coronel Pringles	Buenos Aires	25 de Mayo and Colón; 37.98523°S 61.34973°W	1937	Salamone creates an original concept inspired by New York Art Deco. Built by Sumbre y Cía.	
Coronel Pringles Slaughterhouse	Coronel Pringles Slaughterhouse	Coronel Pringles	Coronel Pringles	Buenos Aires	José Hernández 701; 37.99553°S 61.34568°W	1937	Currently a concrete pipe factory. Inspired by New York Art Deco and Mayan temples has a 21-metre (69 ft)-high blade-like water tower. Built by Sumbre y Cía.	
Cuartel VII - La Verde Municipal Delegation	Cuartel VII - La Verde Municipal Delegation	Cuartel VII - La Verde	Rauch	Buenos Aires	36.433475°S 58.709691°W	1936	Municipal offices for the Rauch Partido in Spanish Colonial Revival style	
Daneri House	Daneri House	Azul	Azul	Buenos Aires	Colón and Belgrano; 36.77618°S 59.86284°W	1938	Private house	
Dr. Manuel B. Cabrera Municipal Hospital	Manuel B. Cabrera Municipal Hospital	Coronel Pringles	Coronel Pringles	Buenos Aires	25 de Mayo and Bahía Blanca; 37.97659°S 61.36158°W	1937	New wing	
El Dorado Municipal Delegation	—	El Dorado	Leandro N. Alem	Buenos Aires	34.65241°S 61.5833°W	1937	Municipal offices for the Leandro N. Alem Partido	
Emilio Canzani House	Emilio Canzani House	Mar del Plata	General Pueyrredón	Buenos Aires	Buenos Aires 2715; 38.01015°S 57.54867°W	1954	Private house in Neoclassical style	
Escobar Municipal Delegation	Escobar City Hall	Belén de Escobar	Escobar	Buenos Aires	Juan Manuel Estrada and Asborno; 34.34585°S 58.79536°W	1938	Currently Escobar City Hall. Originally, only the ground floor was built. In 2019, the first floor and the tower were completed.	
Eustoquio Díaz Vélez Municipal Hospital	Eustoquio Diaz Velez Municipal Hospital	Rauch	Rauch	Buenos Aires	Alberti 450; 36.7809°S 59.08601°W	1936	New north wing	
Garré Municipal Delegation	Garré Municipal Delegation	Garré	Guaminí	Buenos Aires	Arturo Illia and Juan Domingo Perón; 36.56138°S 62.60016°W	1937	Municipal offices for the Guaminí Partido in Spanish Colonial Revival style	
Guaminí City Hall	Guaminí City Hall	Guaminí	Guaminí	Buenos Aires	Manuel Ochoa and Villegas; 37.01091°S 62.42223°W	1937	Uses an avant-garde language that refers to the expressionism of the Einstein Tower and the futurist work of Antonio Sant'Elia and Mario Chiattone.	
Guaminí Slaughterhouse	Guaminí Slaughterhouse	Guaminí	Guaminí	Buenos Aires	37.01874°S 62.41199°W	1937	Currently abandoned. It stands out for its design based on electricity and movement, and its 30-metre (98 ft)-high tower inspired by Metropolis. Built by Sumbre y Cía.	
Laprida Car Impound Lot	Municipal Car Impound Lot	Laprida	Laprida	Buenos Aires	Rivadavia 1359; 37.54721°S 60.80039°W	1936	Currently Municipal Educational Complex	
Laprida Cemetery	Laprida Cemetery	Laprida	Laprida	Buenos Aires	37.56314°S 60.83068°W	1937	Cubist Christ by sculptor Santiago José Chierico on a 32 metres (105 ft) tower, suspended on a pyramid, symbolizing the Golgotha.	
Laprida City Hall	Laprida City Hall	Laprida	Laprida	Buenos Aires	San Martín 1160; 37.54475°S 60.8005°W	1937	It stands out for its slender fortress-like tower with its striking geometric top and clock that rises 30 metres (98 ft). Built by Oscar López Méndez.	
Laprida Slaughterhouse	Laprida Slaughterhouse	Laprida	Laprida	Buenos Aires	37.58114°S 60.84702°W	1937	Currently "Frigorífico Aller"	
Las Varillas City Hall	Las Varillas City Hall	Las Varillas	San Justo	Córdoba	España and M. A. Luque; 31.86969°S 62.71943°W	May 1935–22 March 1936		
Leandro N. Alem City Hall	Leandro N. Alem City Hall	Vedia	Leandro N. Alem	Buenos Aires	Rivadavia and Estrada; 34.49801°S 61.5432°W	Finished in 1938	Stands out a precast Art Deco bow-shaped parasol resembling the grille of a car.	
Los Pinos Municipal Delegation	Los Pinos Municipal Delegation	Los Pinos	Balcarce	Buenos Aires	37.94308°S 58.32493°W	1936	Municipal offices for the Balcarce Partido in Spanish Colonial Revival style	
Michael Ham School	Michael Ham School	Vicente López		Buenos Aires	Juan Lavalle 1076; 34.53018°S 58.47356°W	1951	Private school. New building by Lavalle street	
Miranda Municipal Delegation	Miranda Municipal Delegation	Miranda	Rauch	Buenos Aires	36.53597°S 59.13425°W	1938	Municipal offices for the Rauch Partido in Spanish Colonial Revival style	
Municipal Ranch	—	Laprida	Laprida	Buenos Aires	37.57549°S 60.84904°W	1938	House for the Agricultural School foreman	
Pellegrini Athletic Club	Pellegrini Athletic Club	Pellegrini	Pellegrini	Buenos Aires		1938		
Pellegrini City Hall	Pellegrini City Hall	Pellegrini	Pellegrini	Buenos Aires	Alsina 250; 36.26784°S 63.16448°W	1937	The building, with a central body and a tower crowned by a cubic clock, combines the typology of North American art deco city halls with an austere and geometric design, standing out in the urban landscape like a "tiny skyscraper".	
Pellegrini Slaughterhouse	Pellegrini Slaughterhouse	Pellegrini	Pellegrini	Buenos Aires	36.25544°S 63.17379°W	1937	Currently abandoned	
Pilar Cemetery	Pilar Cemetery	Pilar	Pilar	Buenos Aires	Lorenzo López 1202; 34.45959°S 58.92246°W	1938	The great cross in the gate of the cemetery built by Salamone was demolished in 1947.	
Rauch City Hall	Rauch City Hall	Rauch	Rauch	Buenos Aires	Rivadavia 750; 36.77519°S 59.08619°W	1937	Its clock tower stands out for its ascending vertical sheets. Built by Alexis Elsner.	
Rural Normal School	Rural Normal School	Balcarce	Balcarce	Buenos Aires	Uriburu and Calle 18; 37.84758°S 58.25458°W	1938	Currently Secondary School Nº1 Antonio González Balcarce	
Saldungaray Cemetery	Saldungaray Cemetery	Saldungaray	Tornquist	Buenos Aires	Corrales and Rincón; 38.20148°S 61.7591°W	1937	A huge automobile wheel with 18 metres (59 ft) diameter inner spokes functions as a metaphor for speed.	
Saldungaray Municipal Delegation	Saldungaray Municipal Delegation	Saldungaray	Tornquist	Buenos Aires	La Plata and Pavón; 38.20456°S 61.77002°W	1937–1938	Municipal offices for the Tornquist Partido. The clock tower, over 16 metres (52 ft) high, is the highlight and central axis of the composition of a symmetrical building. Built by Sumbre y Cía.	
Saldungaray Municipal Market	Saldungaray Municipal Market	Saldungaray	Tornquist	Buenos Aires	Belgrano and Donado; 38.20669°S 61.77323°W	1937		
Saldungaray Slaughterhouse	Saldungaray Slaughterhouse	Saldungaray	Tornquist	Buenos Aires	38.1853°S 61.77483°W	1937	Currently abandoned	
Salliqueló Cemetery	Salliqueló Cemetery	Salliqueló	Salliqueló	Buenos Aires	36.76632°S 62.96278°W	1937–1938		
Salliqueló Slaughterhouse	Salliqueló Slaughterhouse	Salliqueló	Salliqueló	Buenos Aires	Dr. Juan Moreda and Uruguay; 36.75392°S 62.95089°W	1937–1938	Currently a cultural center. The water tower, more than 21 metres (69 ft) high, rises with vertical sheets that suggest horns or blades. Built by Luis V. Migone.	
San Agustín Municipal Delegation	San Agustín Municipal Delegation	San Agustín	Balcarce	Buenos Aires	38.01063°S 58.35607°W	1936–1937	Municipal offices for the Balcarce Partido in Spanish Colonial Revival style	
San Jorge Municipal Delegation	San Jorge Municipal Delegation	San Jorge	Laprida	Buenos Aires	37.22949°S 60.96189°W	1937	Municipal offices for the Laprida Partido in Spanish Colonial Revival style	
Spain House	—	Villa María	General San Martín	Córdoba	Bartolomé Mitre 82; 32.41372°S 63.24566°W	1935	Original built c. 1920 by the Spanish Association of Mutual Aid. Salamone built a cinema hall in Moorish Revival style.	
Tornquist City Hall	Tornquist City Hall	Tornquist	Tornquist	Buenos Aires	Sarmiento 53; 38.10054°S 62.2215°W	1937	The palace features an expressionist design with a ceremonial concrete balcony, loggias and a tower that exaggerates its verticality.	
Tornquist Slaughterhouse	Tornquist Slaughterhouse	Tornquist	Tornquist	Buenos Aires	38.09978°S 62.25072°W	1937	Extension. Currently abandoned.	
Tres Lomas Municipal Delegation	Tres Lomas Municipal Delegation	Tres Lomas	Tres Lomas	Buenos Aires	Rivadavia 149; 36.45946°S 62.86174°W	1937	Currently Tres Lomas City Hall	
Tres Lomas Slaughterhouse	Tres Lomas Slaughterhouse	Tres Lomas	Tres Lomas	Buenos Aires	36.45034°S 62.85073°W	1937–1938	Currently municipal offices. Using shapes alluding to the porcelain insulators of high voltage lines as an allegory of energy in the 17 metres (56 ft) tower. Built by Luis V. Migone.	
Tres Picos Municipal Delegation	Tres Picos Municipal Delegation	Tres Picos	Tornquist	Buenos Aires	38.28776°S 62.21075°W	1937	Municipal offices for the Tornquist Partido in Spanish Colonial Revival style	
Vedia Slaughterhouse	Vedia Slaughterhouse	Vedia	Leandro N. Alem	Buenos Aires	34.49891°S 61.55911°W	1937	Currently abandoned. It stands out for the circular platforms of its tower, intertwined by semicircular porticoed structures and minimalist iron railings.	
Villa Epecuén Slaughterhouse	Villa Epecuén Slaughterhouse	Villa Epecuén	Adolfo Alsina	Buenos Aires	37.14527°S 62.78562°W	1937–3 December 1938	Destroyed by a flood in 1985. The robust water tower reiterates the expressive force of a blade.	
Villa María Slaughterhouse	Villa María Slaughterhouse	Villa María	General San Martín	Córdoba	Paso de los Libres and Marcelo T. de Alvear; 32.42474°S 63.22311°W	1934–February 1936	Currently "Frigorífico Villa María"	

== Squares and street furniture ==
Squares and Street Furniture
Work	Image	City	Departamento/ Partido	Province	Address Coordinates	Construction	Notes	Ref.
9 de Julio Boulevard	—	Salliqueló	Salliqueló	Buenos Aires	36.75083°S 62.95959°W	1938	Demolished	
25 de Mayo Boulevard	25 de Mayo Boulevard in Coronel Pringles	Coronel Pringles	Coronel Pringles	Buenos Aires	37.98300°S 61.35247°W	1937		
Alsina Square	Alsina Square in Guaminí	Guaminí	Guaminí	Buenos Aires	37.01109°S 62.42202°W	1937		
Cemetery Cross	Coronel Pringles Cemetery Cross	Coronel Pringles	Coronel Pringles	Buenos Aires	37.9761°S 61.32943°W		Sculptor Santiago José Chierico	
Cemetery Cross	Arroyo Corto Cemetery Cross	Arroyo Corto	Saavedra	Buenos Aires	37.50678°S 62.32111°W	1937	In memory of the provincial deputy Fortunato Chiappara Jr., murdered by the provincial deputy Mario Bessone in 1937.	
Cemetery Cross	Tornquist Cemetery Cross	Tornquist	Tornquist	Buenos Aires	38.089681°S 62.217789°W	1938	Sculptor Santiago José Chierico	
Centenario Square	Centenario Square in Villa María	Villa María	General San Martín	Córdoba	32.41036°S 63.24334°W	1934–12 October 1935		
Cross	—	Arano	Adolfo Alsina	Buenos Aires	37.054549°S 63.299044°W	1937	Sculptor Santiago José Chierico. Originally in Carhué. Moved to estancia Las Calaveras after collapsing in storm shortly after being placed.	
Cross	Azul Cross	Azul	Azul	Buenos Aires	Piazza and National Route 3; 36.79242°S 59.83987°W		Sculptor Santiago José Chierico	
Cross	Carhué Cemetery Cross	Carhué	Adolfo Alsina	Buenos Aires	37.16828°S 62.77341°W	1938	Sculptor Santiago José Chierico. Replaced the cross currently in Arano.	
Cross	—	Estomba	Tornquist	Buenos Aires	38.367461°S 61.829093°W	30 August 1937	Commemorates the site of an air crash where three people died.	
Cross	Guaminí Cross	Guaminí	Guaminí	Buenos Aires	Hipólito Irigoyen and G. Pereyra; 37.01665°S 62.4135°W			
Domingo Faustino Sarmiento Municipal Park Gate	Domingo Faustino Sarmiento Municipal Park Gate in Azul	Azul	Azul	Buenos Aires	Guaminí and Pellegrini; 36.78292°S 59.87097°W	1937		
Ernesto Tornquist Square	Ernesto Tornquist Square in Tornquist	Tornquist	Tornquist	Buenos Aires	38.10065°S 62.22303°W	1937	Originally designed by Carlos Thays	
España Boulevard	España Boulevard in Villa María	Villa María	General San Martín	Córdoba	32.40485°S 63.24204°W	1934	Demolished	
General José Arias Square	General José Arias Square	Alberti	Alberti	Buenos Aires	35.03157°S 60.28024°W	1937		
General San Martín Municipal Park Gate	General San Martín Municipal Park Gate	Alberti	Alberti	Buenos Aires	Gral. San Martín and Vaccarezza; 35.02699°S 60.28256°W	1937		
Independencia Square	Independencia Square in Saldungaray	Saldungaray	Tornquist	Buenos Aires	38.20524°S 61.76958°W	1937		
Independencia Square	—	Villa María	General San Martín	Córdoba	32.41500°S 63.24353°W	1934	Landscaping	
Juan Pascual Pringles Square	Juan Pascual Pringles Square in Coronel Pringles	Coronel Pringles	Coronel Pringles	Buenos Aires	37.98499°S 61.35003°W	1937–1939		
Leandro N. Alem Square	Leandro N. Alem Square in Tres Lomas	Tres Lomas	Tres Lomas	Buenos Aires	36.45912°S 62.8625°W	1938		
Libertad Square	Libertad Square in Balcarce	Balcarce	Balcarce	Buenos Aires	37.84646°S 58.25548°W	1936	The base for Monument to the Republic built by Salamone was demolished in 1945. A door was rescued and is installed in the Municipal Historical Museum.	
Libres del Sur Municipal Park	—	Chascomús	Chascomús	Buenos Aires	35.58027°S 58.01780°W	1938		
Pedro Pereyra Square	Pedro Pereyra Square in Laprida	Laprida	Laprida	Buenos Aires	37.54423°S 37.54423°W	1936–1937		
Rauch City Hall Square	Rauch City Hall Square	Rauch	Rauch	Buenos Aires	36.77506°S 59.08639°W	1938		
Rivadavia Square	Rivadavia Square in Vedia	Vedia	Leandro N. Alem	Buenos Aires	34.49792°S 61.54228°W	1937		
San Martín Square	San Martín Square in Azul	Azul	Azul	Buenos Aires	36.77749°S 59.86346°W	1937	It presents a biaxial design with a main axis that highlights the monumental views of the city hall and the cathedral.	
San Martín Square	General José de San Martín Square in Pellegrini	Pellegrini	Pellegrini	Buenos Aires	36.26799°S 63.16435°W	1937		
San Martín Square	—	Pilar	Pilar	Buenos Aires	34.45873°S 58.91392°W	1938		
San Martín Square	—	Villa María	General San Martín	Córdoba	32.41352°S 63.24834°W	1934	Landscaping	

== Attributed works ==
For the following works the authorship of Salamone cannot be fully confirmed.

Attributed Works
Work	Image	City	Departamento	Province	Address Coordinates	Year	Notes	Ref.
Alta Gracia Slaughterhouse	—	Alta Gracia	Santa María	Córdoba	31.66964°S 64.43042°W	c. 1941	Possible work by Antonio Medina Allende. Currently Padre Domingo Viera Agrotechnical Institute.	
Cinema	Cinema in Valle Hermoso	Valle Hermoso	Punilla	Córdoba	Castellana 315; 31.12420°S 64.48907°W	1928	According to oral source	
Club La Unión	Club La Unión	Arroyo Corto	Saavedra	Buenos Aires	37.514431°S 62.311792°W	1937		
El Dominador Neighborhood	—	Valle Hermoso	Punilla	Córdoba	31.10158°S 64.48882°W	1925	According to oral source	
El Rincón Neighborhood	—	Valle Hermoso	Punilla	Córdoba		1928	According to oral source	
General Belgrano Municipal Park Gate	General Belgrano Municipal Park Gate in Venado Tuerto	Venado Tuerto	General López	Santa Fe	Jujuy and Caseros; 33.73995°S 61.95877°W	Finished in February 1941	Identical to the General San Martín Municipal Park Gate in Alberti, Buenos Aires	
Juan de Garay Municipal Park Gate	Juan de Garay Municipal Park Gate in Santa Fe	Santa Fe	La Capital	Santa Fe	Juan Perón and Salvador Caputo; 31.63691°S 60.71865°W		Demolished in 1987	
Mansion	—	Córdoba	Capital	Córdoba	Av. Argentina 640; 31.42960°S 64.18474°W	1921	Possible house in the current address of Hipólito Yrigoyen 638 attributed to Ubaldo Emiliani. Salamone possibly participated in the beginning of construction or was later remodeled by Emiliani in Liberty style.	

== Unbuilt works ==
Unbuilt Works
Work	City	Departamento/ Partido	Province	Address	Year	Notes	Ref.
Alberti Car Impound Lot	Alberti	Alberti	Buenos Aires		1937		
Azul City Hall	Azul	Azul	Buenos Aires		1937	Preliminary draft	
Balcarce Car Impound Lot	Balcarce	Balcarce	Buenos Aires		1936		
Boulevard	Tigre	Tigre	Buenos Aires	Rocha Street	1938	Draft	
Business	Córdoba	Capital	Córdoba	25 de Mayo and Alvear	1922	Possibly not built, demolished, remodeled or simply unidentifiable.	
Carmen de Patagones Cemetery	Carmen de Patagones	Patagones	Buenos Aires		1938	Preliminary draft	
Chascomús Cemetery	Chascomús	Chascomús	Buenos Aires		1938	Preliminary draft	
Daireaux City Hall	Daireaux	Daireaux	Buenos Aires		1938	Preliminary draft	
Daireaux Slaughterhouse	Daireaux	Daireaux	Buenos Aires		1938	Preliminary draft	
Dr. Allende's Palace	Córdoba	Capital	Córdoba	Alvear 160	1921	Possibly not built, demolished, remodeled or simply unidentifiable.	
Dr. Ricardo Villela's Apartment Building	Córdoba	Capital	Córdoba	Deán Funes 168/174	1921	Possibly not built, demolished, remodeled or simply unidentifiable.	
Gran Hotel Victoria	Córdoba	Capital	Córdoba		1922	Possibly not built, demolished, remodeled or simply unidentifiable.	
Hospital	Daireaux	Daireaux	Buenos Aires		1938	Preliminary draft	
Hospital	Lobería	Lobería	Buenos Aires		1938	Draft	
Hotel	Corrientes	Capital	Corrientes	Punta Vidal		Preliminary draft	
Independencia Square	Villa María	General San Martín	Córdoba		1935	Preliminary draft	
José de San Martín Monument	Mar del Plata	General Pueyrredón	Buenos Aires		1953	Project for the 100th anniversary of the death of José de San Martín	
Lezama Cemetery	Lezama	Lezama	Buenos Aires		1938	Preliminary draft	
Lezama Municipal Delegation	Lezama	Lezama	Buenos Aires		1938	Preliminary draft	
Lobería Cemetery	Lobería	Lobería	Buenos Aires		1938	Draft	
Lobería City Hall	Lobería	Lobería	Buenos Aires		1938	Draft	
Lobería Slaughterhouse	Lobería	Lobería	Buenos Aires		1938	Draft	
Market	Tigre	Tigre	Buenos Aires		1938	Draft	
Mitre Square	Lobería	Lobería	Buenos Aires		1938	Draft	
Mrs. Garzón Palacio's Palace	Córdoba	Capital	Córdoba			Possibly not built, demolished, remodeled or simply unidentifiable.	
Municipal Park	Carmen de Patagones	Patagones	Buenos Aires		1938	Preliminary draft	
Napaleofú Municipal Delegation	Napaleofú	Balcarce	Buenos Aires		1936	Draft	
National University of Cordoba	Córdoba	Capital	Córdoba	Vélez Sársfield and Duarte Quirós	1922	Preliminary draft for contest. Extension.	
Palace of the 14 Provinces	Buenos Aires City	—				Preliminary draft	
Policemen and Firemen Pantheon	Buenos Aires City	—		La Chacarita Cemetery	1919	Preliminary draft for contest	
Public assistance	Villa María	General San Martín	Córdoba	Lisandro de la Torre and Catamarca	1934	Preliminary draft	
Quequén Municipal Delegation	Quequén	Necochea	Buenos Aires		1938	Draft	
Quequén Slaughterhouse	Quequén	Necochea	Buenos Aires		1938	Draft	
Ramblas	Lobería	Lobería	Buenos Aires		1938	Draft	
Ramos Otero Municipal Delegation	Ramos Otero	Balcarce	Buenos Aires		1936	Draft	
Rivadavia Square	Tigre	Tigre	Buenos Aires		1938	Draft	
Rivera Municipal Delegation	Rivera	Adolfo Alsina	Buenos Aires		1937	Draft	
Salazar Municipal Delegation	Salazar	Daireaux	Buenos Aires		1938	Preliminary draft	
San Martín Square	Tigre	Tigre	Buenos Aires		1938	Draft	
San Martín Square	Villa María	General San Martín	Córdoba		1935	Preliminary draft	
San Miguel Arcángel Municipal Delegation	San Miguel Arcángel	Adolfo Alsina	Buenos Aires		1937	Draft	
Small Square	Tigre	Tigre	Buenos Aires		1938	Draft	
South Markert	Córdoba	Capital	Córdoba		1925	Preliminary draft for contest. First prize.	
Teacher's Pantheon	Córdoba	Capital	Córdoba	San Jerónimo Cemetery	1922	Preliminary draft	
Tigre Cemetery	Tigre	Tigre	Buenos Aires		1938	Draft	
Tres Arroyos Slaughterhouse	Tres Arroyos	Tres Arroyos	Buenos Aires		1938	Draft	
Villa María City Hall	Villa María	General San Martín	Córdoba		1933	Draft	

== Misattributed works ==
Misattributed Works
Work	City	Partido	Province	Notes	Ref.
Italians' Clock	Chascomús	Chascomús	Buenos Aires	Work by Telésforo Sallaberry	
Mar Chiquita City Hall	Coronel Vidal	Mar Chiquita	Buenos Aires	Work by Ingeniero Civil Francisco Marseillán SRL	
Pirovano Municipal Delegation	Pirovano	Bolívar	Buenos Aires	Work by Ingeniero Civil Francisco Marseillán SRL	
Puan City Hall	Puan	Puan	Buenos Aires	Work by César Fernández	
Salto City Hall	Salto	Salto	Buenos Aires	Work by Esteban Pérez	
Urdampilleta Municipal Delegation	Urdampilleta	Bolívar	Buenos Aires	Work by Ingeniero Civil Francisco Marseillán SRL	
