= Legislature of Buenos Aires Province =

Provincial legislature in Argentina

Legislature of Buenos Aires Province Legislatura de la Provincia de Buenos Aires

Type
- Type: Bicameral
- Houses: Senate; Chamber of Deputies

Leadership
- Senate President (Note: Ex officio as Vice Governor of Buenos Aires.): Verónica Magario (FDT) since 10 December 2019
- 1st Senate Vice President: Luis Vivona (FDT) since 10 December 2019
- Chamber President: Federico Otermín (FDT) since 10 December 2019

Structure
- Seats: 138; 46 senators 92 deputies
- Senate political groups: FP (24); LLA (10); PRO (5); UCR (4); Union and Freedom (3)
- Chamber of Deputies political groups: FP (39); LLA (20); PRO (11); UCR (6); Union and Freedom (5); Nuevos Aires (3); CC (3); FIT-U (2); Open Space - Facts (2); Popular Right (1)

Elections
- Last Senate election: 7 September 2025 (23 seats)
- Last Chamber of Deputies election: 7 September 2025 (46 seats)

Meeting place
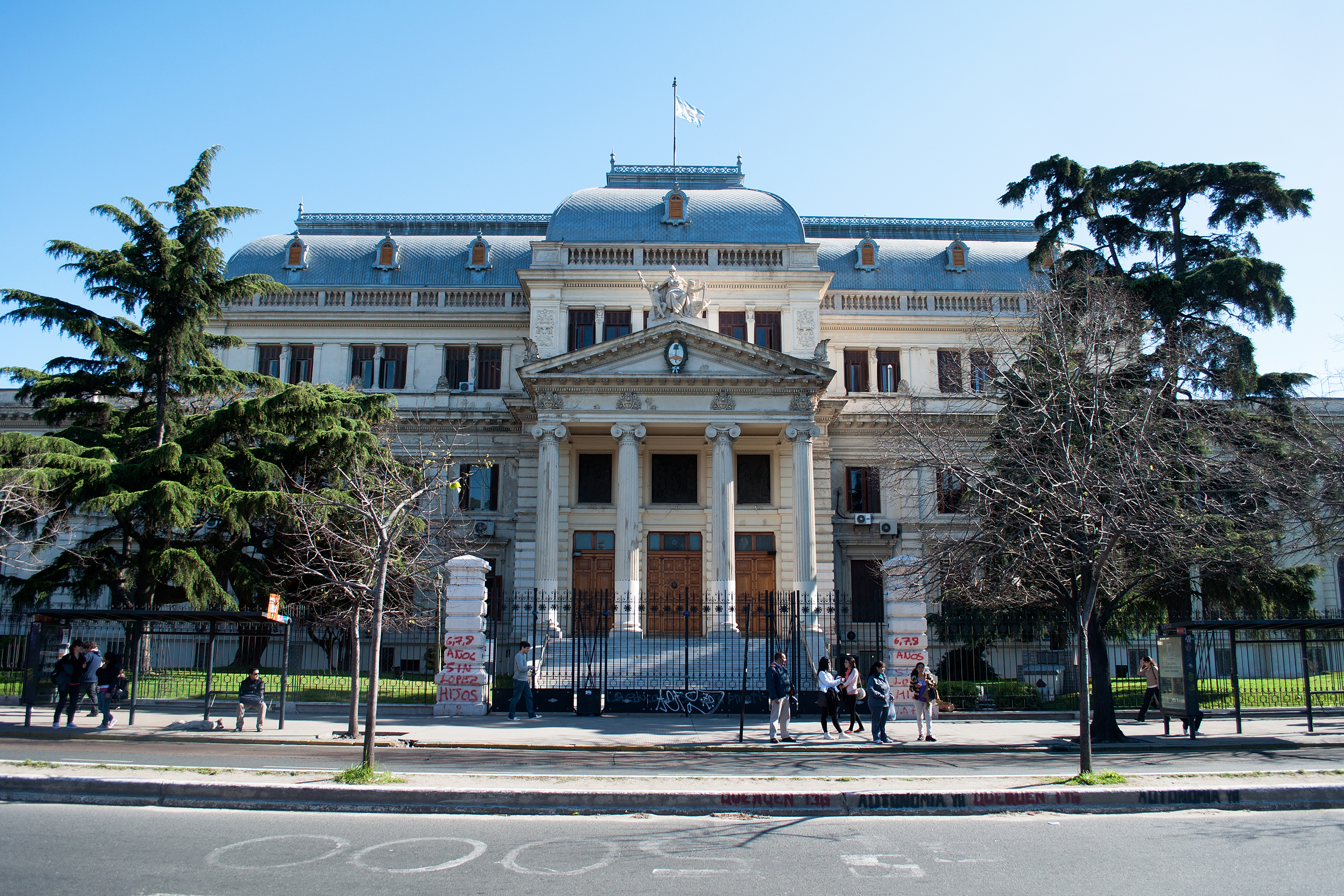
- Legislative Palace; La Plata, Buenos Aires Province

The Legislature of Buenos Aires Province (Spanish: Legislatura de la Provincia de Buenos Aires) is the legislature of Buenos Aires, one of the twenty three provinces that make up Argentina. It is a bicameral body, comprising the Chamber of Deputies (made up of 92 representatives), and the Senate (with 46 representatives).

It is one of eight bicameral legislatures in the country. Members of both houses are elected by proportional representation for four-year terms in eight multi-member constituencies which span the entirety of the province's territory. As in the National Chamber of Deputies and most other provincial legislatures, elections to both houses of the legislature are held every two years, so that half of its members are up in each election.

Both houses of the Legislature convene in the Legislative Palace of Buenos Aires, in the provincial capital of La Plata. The building, a city landmark, was designed by Hannover architects Gustav Heine and Georg Hagemann in 1883 and completed in 1888.

== Electoral sections ==
Members of both houses of the Legislature are elected in eight multi-member districts known as "Electoral Sections" (Spanish: secciones electorales) that cover the entirety of the province's territory. The electoral sections are split along the lines of the 135 partidos of Buenos Aires Province; the 8th section (commonly known as the "Capital Electoral Section") corresponds to La Plata Partido only. The electoral sections are governed by electoral law 25,548.

Electoral Section	Partidos	Deputies	Senators	Map
First	See list: Campana; Escobar; General Las Heras; General Rodríguez; General San Martín; Hurlingham; Ituzaingó; José C. Paz; Luján; Malvinas Argentinas; Marcos Paz; Mercedes; Merlo; Moreno; Morón; Navarro; Pilar; San Fernando; San Isidro; San Miguel; Suipacha; Tigre; Tres de Febrero; Vicente López	15	8	
Second	See list: Arrecifes; Baradero; Capitán Sarmiento; Carmen de Areco; Colón; Exaltación de la Cruz; Pergamino; Ramallo; Rojas; Salto; San Andrés de Giles; San Antonio de Areco; San Nicolás; San Pedro; Zárate	11	5	
Third	See list: Almirante Brown; Avellaneda; Berazategui; Berisso; Brandsen; Cañuelas; Ensenada; Esteban Echeverría; Ezeiza; Florencio Varela; La Matanza; Lanús; Lobos; Lomas de Zamora; Magdalena; Presidente Perón; Punta Indio; Quilmes; San Vicente	18	9	
Fourth	See list: Alberti; Bragado; Carlos Casares; Carlos Tejedor; Chacabuco; Chivilcoy; Florentino Ameghino; General Arenales; General Pinto; General Viamonte; General Villegas; Hipólito Yrigoyen; Junín; Leandro N. Alem; Lincoln; Nueve de Julio; Pehuajó; Rivadavia; Trenque Lauquen	14	7	
Fifth	See list: Ayacucho; Balcarce; Castelli; Chascomús; Dolores; General Alvarado; General Belgrano; General Guido; General Lavalle; General Madariaga; General Paz; General Pueyrredón; La Costa; Las Flores; Lezama; Lobería; Maipú; Mar Chiquita; Monte; Necochea; Pila; Pinamar; Rauch; San Cayetano; Tandil; Tordillo; Villa Gesell	11	5	
Sixth	See list: Adolfo Alsina; Adolfo Gonzales Chaves; Bahía Blanca; Benito Juárez; Coronel Dorrego; Coronel Pringles; Coronel Rosales; Coronel Suárez; Daireaux; Guaminí; General Lamadrid; Laprida; Monte Hermoso; Patagones; Pellegrini; Puan; Saavedra; Salliqueló; Tres Arroyos; Tres Lomas; Tornquist; Villarino	11	6	
Seventh	See list: Azul; Bolívar; General Alvear; Olavarría; Roque Pérez; Saladillo; Tapalqué; Veinticinco de Mayo	6	3	
Capital	La Plata	6	3	

== See also ==
- List of provincial legislatures in Argentina
- Parliament of Argentina
