= Francisco Salamone =

Argentine architect

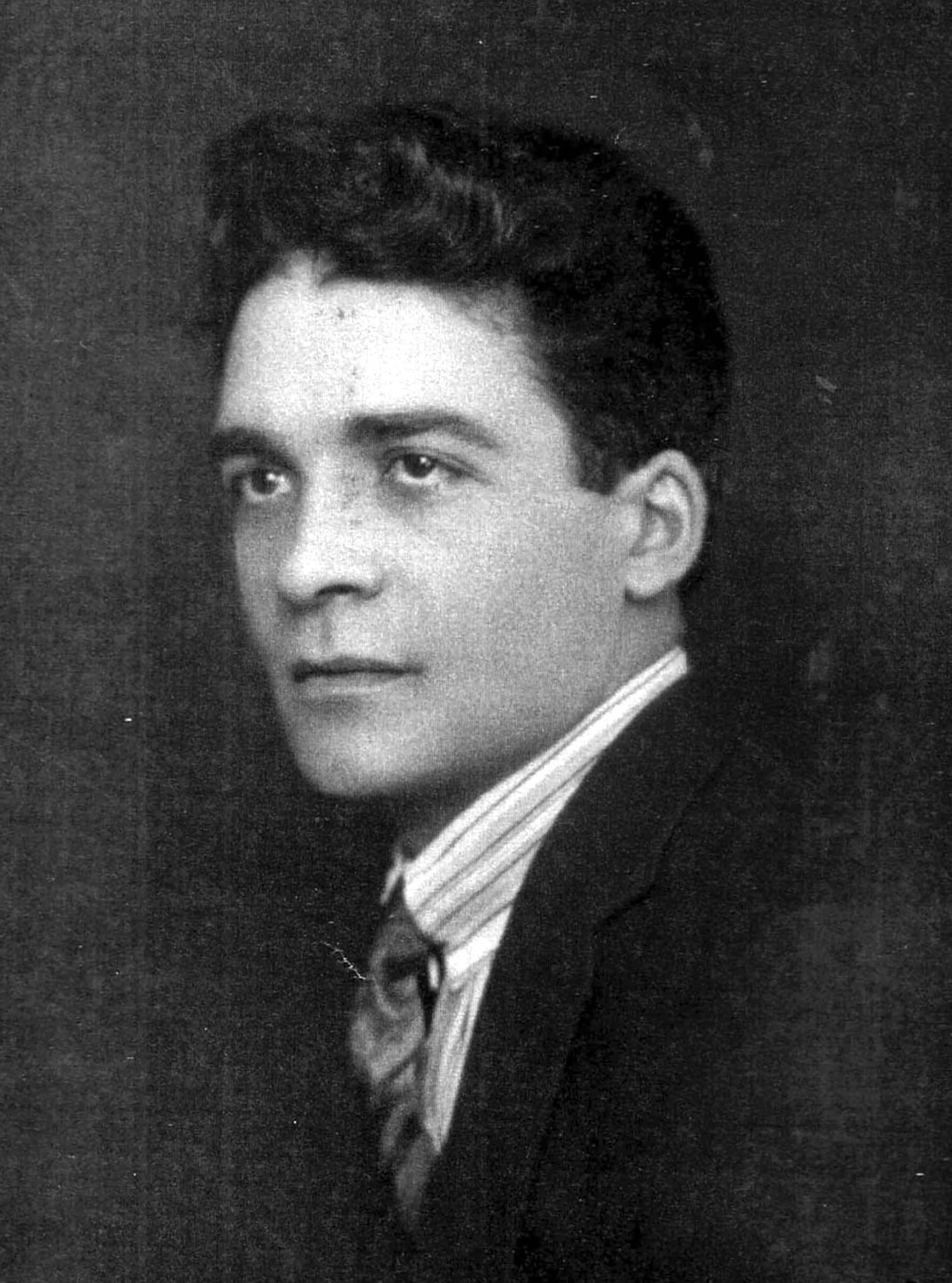
- Born: June 5, 1897; Leonforte, Kingdom of Italy
- Died: August 8, 1959 (aged 62); Buenos Aires, Argentina
- Resting place: La Recoleta Cemetery
- Education: National University of Córdoba
- Occupations: Architect and engineer
- Known for: City halls, slaughterhouses and cemeteries

Francisco Salamone (June 5, 1897 – August 8, 1959) was an Argentine architect born in Italy who, between 1936 and 1940, during the Infamous Decade, built more than 60 municipal buildings with elements of Art Deco style in 25 rural communities on the Argentine pampas within the Buenos Aires Province. These buildings were some of the first examples of modern architecture in rural Argentina.

== Life ==
Salamone's was born in the town of Leonforte, Sicily in 1897, son of Salvatore Salamone and Antonia D'Anna. After leaving the Otto Krause Technical School in Buenos Aires he continued his studies in the National University of Córdoba where he graduated in 1917 with a degree in architecture and civil engineering.

Salamone married Adolfina Croft, the daughter of the Austria-Hungarian Vice-consul in Bahia Blanca, Argentina, with whom he had four children: Ricardo, Roberto, Ana Maria and Stella Maris. During Manuel Fresco's term, a conservative politician who was governor of the Province of Buenos Aires during the period 1936-1940, Salamone built more than 70 municipal buildings. His designs were a notable and very personal combination of Art Deco functionalism, Italian Futurism on a vast scale. The use of reinforced concrete made it possible to construct buildings to a height that at that time made them symbols of municipal power and authority.

The rural towns in which Salamone's buildings appeared were either frontier towns, built at the end of the nineteenth century on the edge of Indian territory, or were situated at regular intervals along newly built rail links. These towns were named after the colonels and generals who led the Conquest of the Desert and engineers who pioneered the building of the railways in this part of the Province.

In the 1950s, Salamone designed several condominiums in Rationist style. He died on 8 August 1959, relatively forgotten, but leaving behind him a monumental architectural inheritance on the Argentine pampas. He was buried in Recoleta Cemetery and later transferred to Cemetery Jardin de Paz.

== Buildings ==
Salamone's work comprised three types of municipal buildings:

- Town Halls: these are characterised by their massive proportions and high tower, taller than the local church tower, to symbolise the advance of civilisation over the pampas and recalled both the Italian medieval palazzi comunali and the designs of Benito Mussolini's Italy. These buildings were clearly intended to be the centre of urban life. Examples are to be found in Carlos Pellegrini, Alberti, Carhué, Guamini, Adolfo Alsina, Laprida, Rauch, Balcarce, Tornquist, Puán, Chillar, Saldungaray, Gonzales Chaves and Coronel Pringles.
- Cemetery Portals: these were also characterised by their massive proportions. Examples can be found in Saldungaray, Laprida, Azul, Salliqueló and Balcarce.
- Slaughterhouses: these are functional in design, on the outskirts of towns, and have become obsolete with the introduction of modern butchery techniques and the advent of cold-storage plants. Examples can be found in Tres Lomas, Balcarce, Carhué, Guaminí, Coronel Pringles (whose tower is in the form of the blade of a knife), Azul, Laprida, Vedia, Villa Epecuén, Salliqueló, Chillar and Carlos Pelegrini.

== Works ==
=== City halls ===
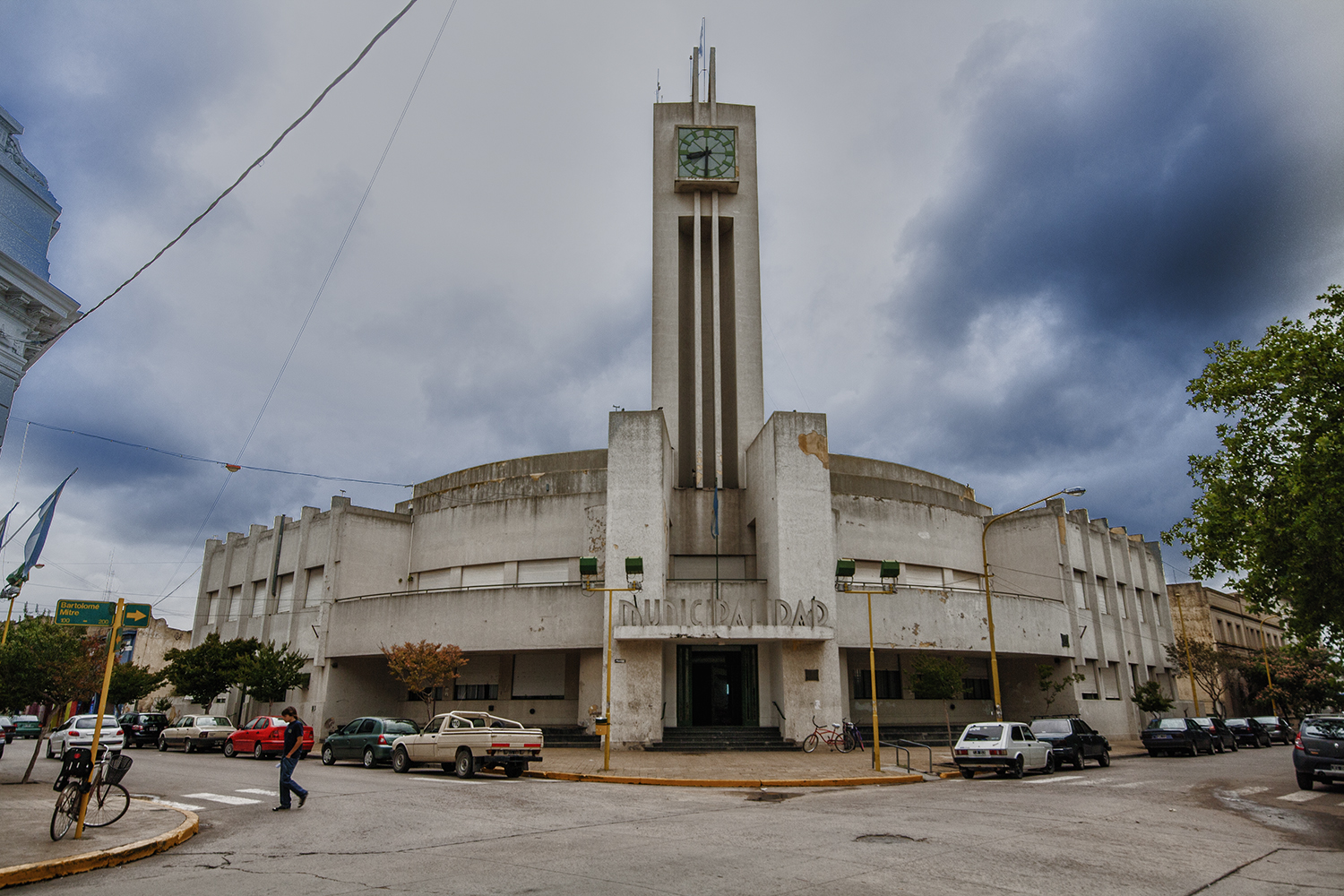
Adolfo Gonzales Chaves city hall

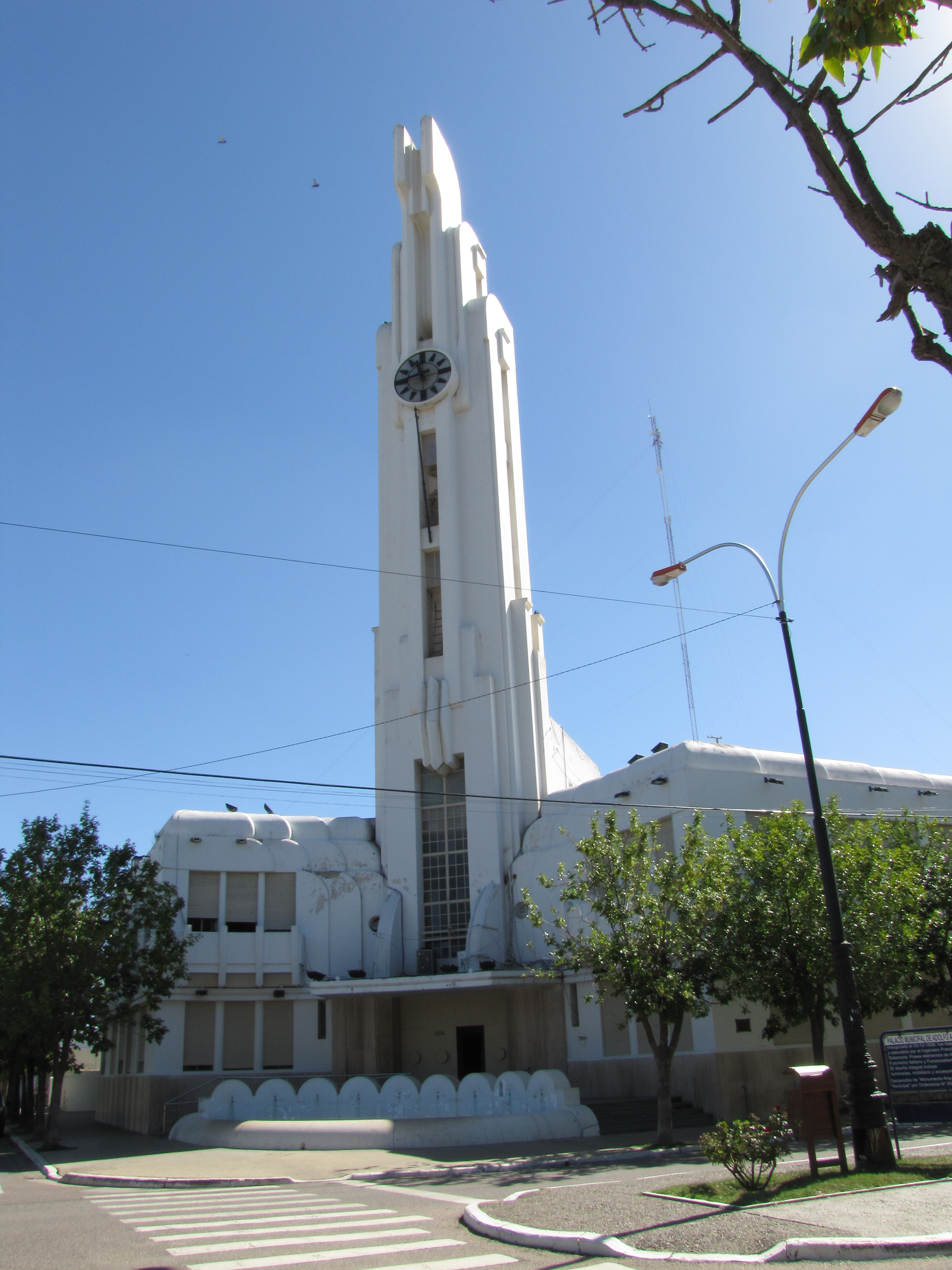
Carhué city hall

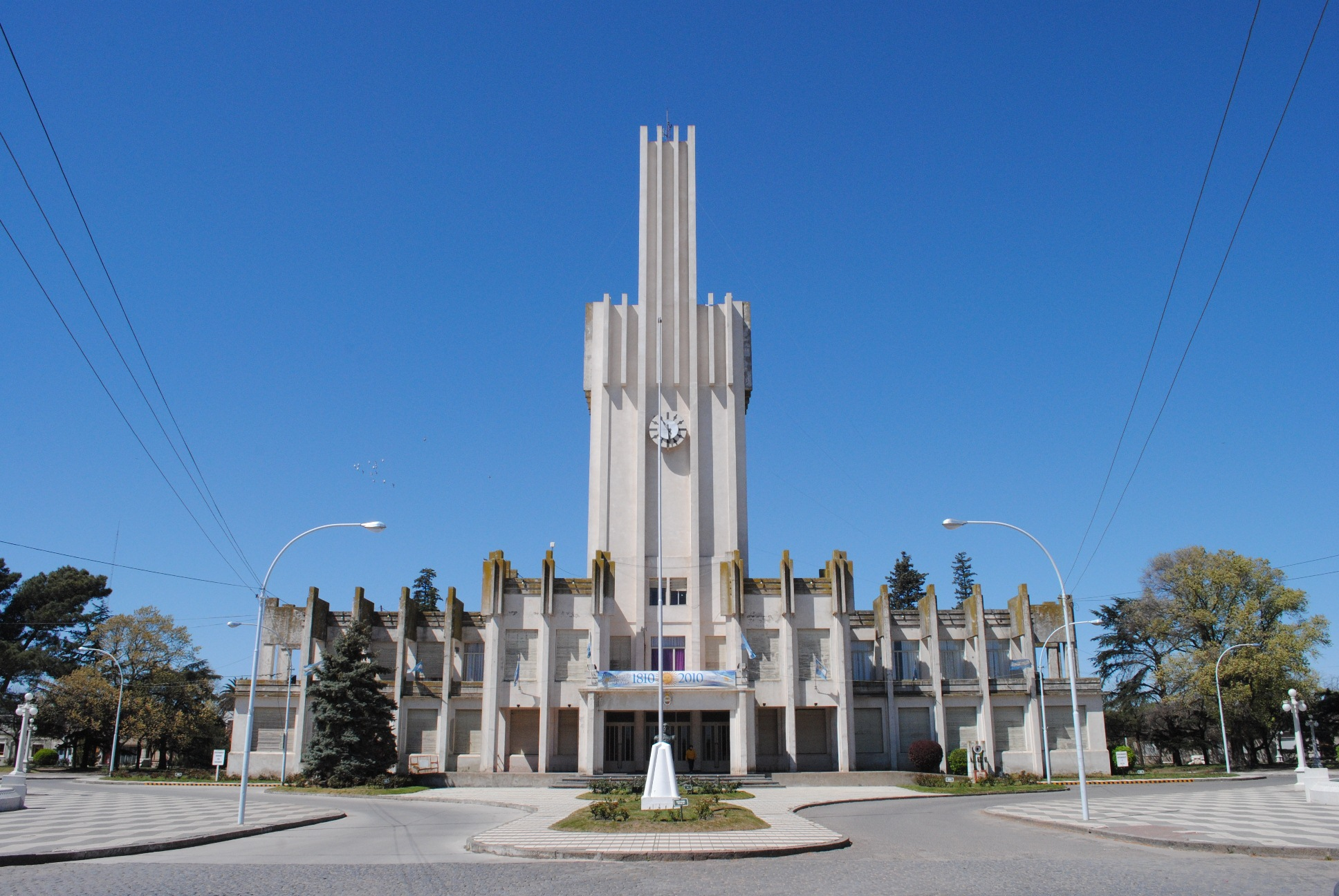
Coronel Pringles city hall

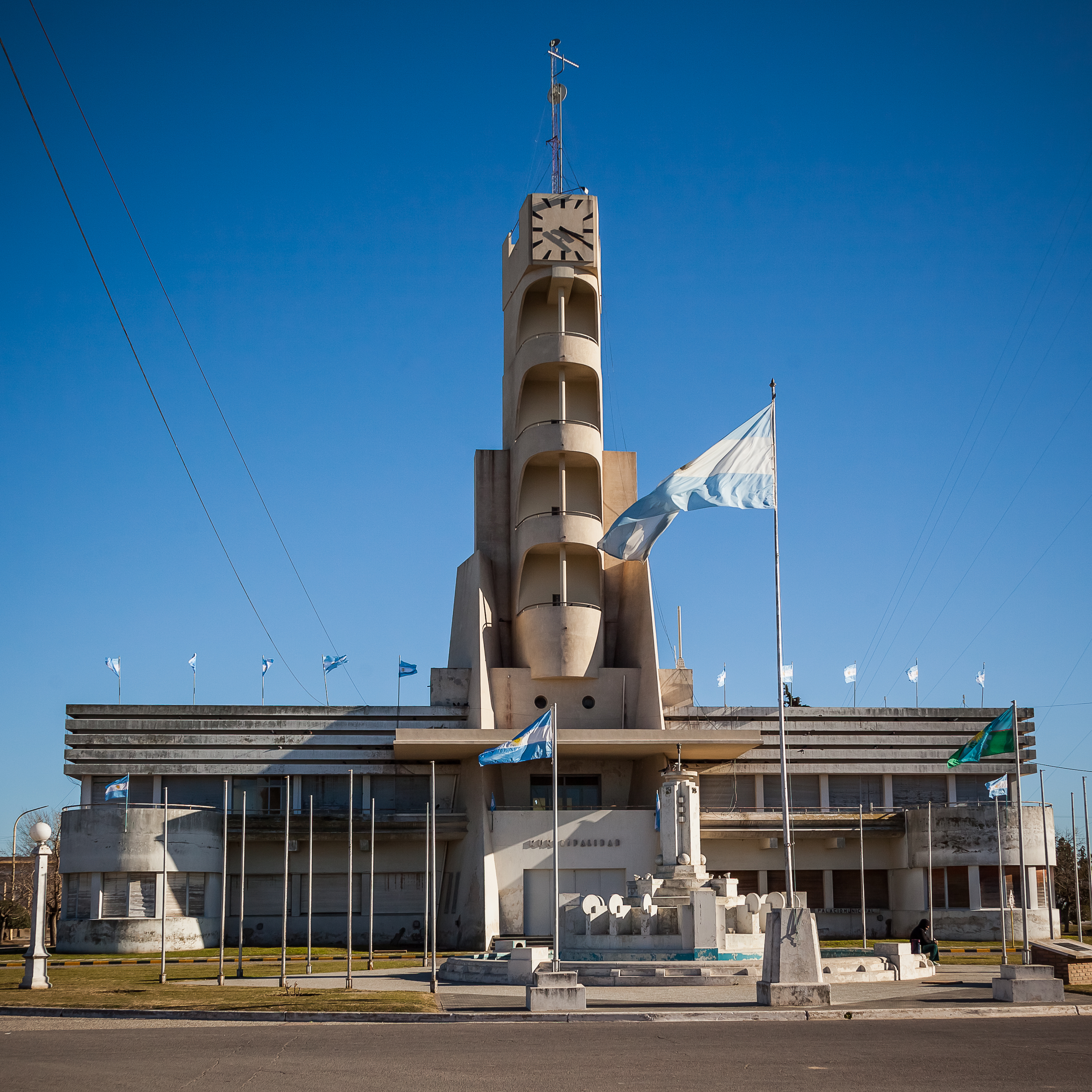
Guaminí city hall

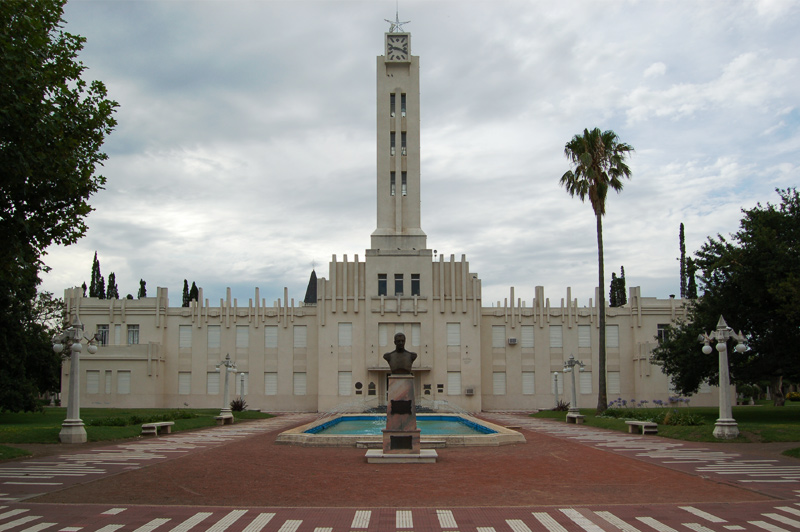
Pellegrini city hall

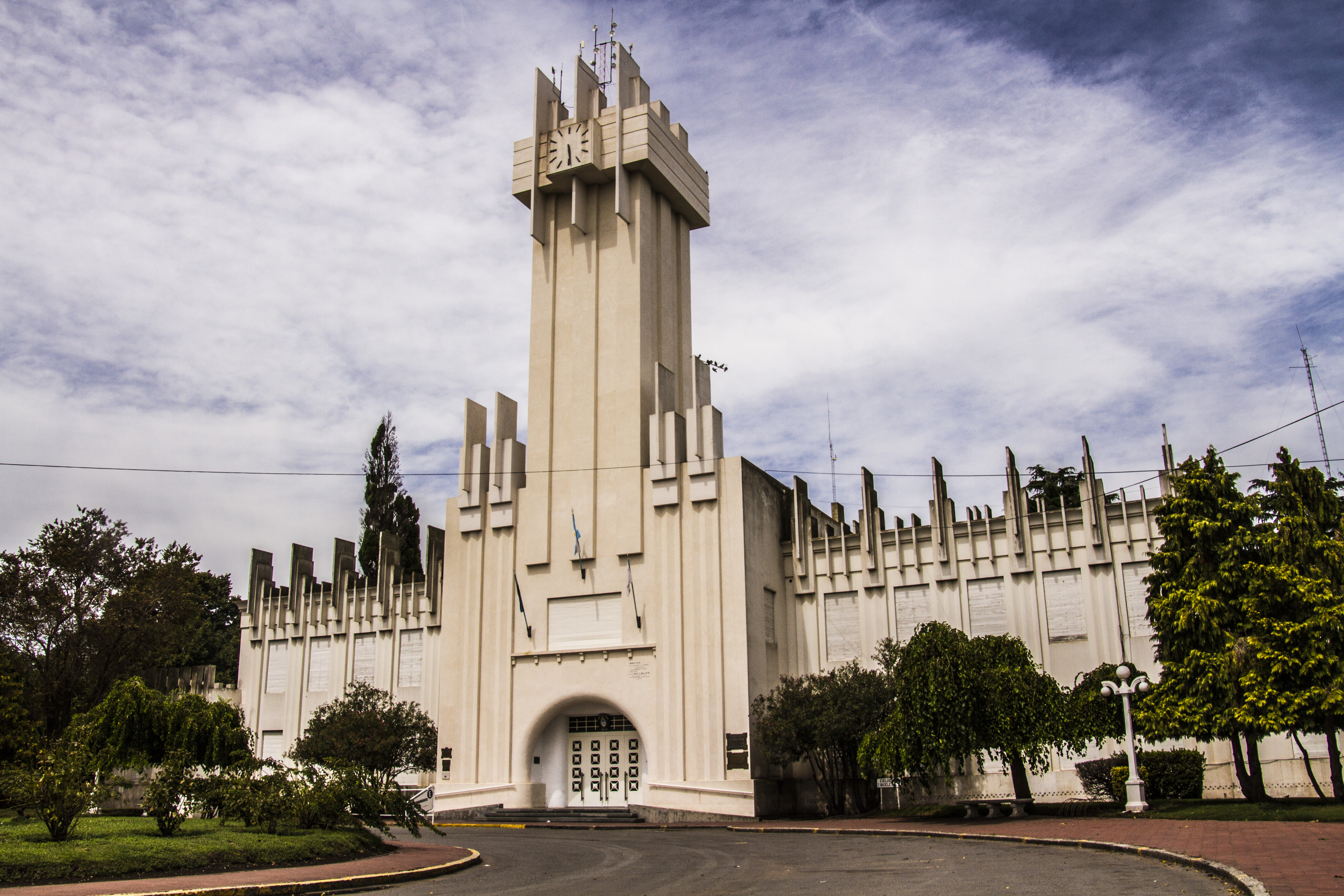
Rauch city hall

=== Slaughterhouses ===
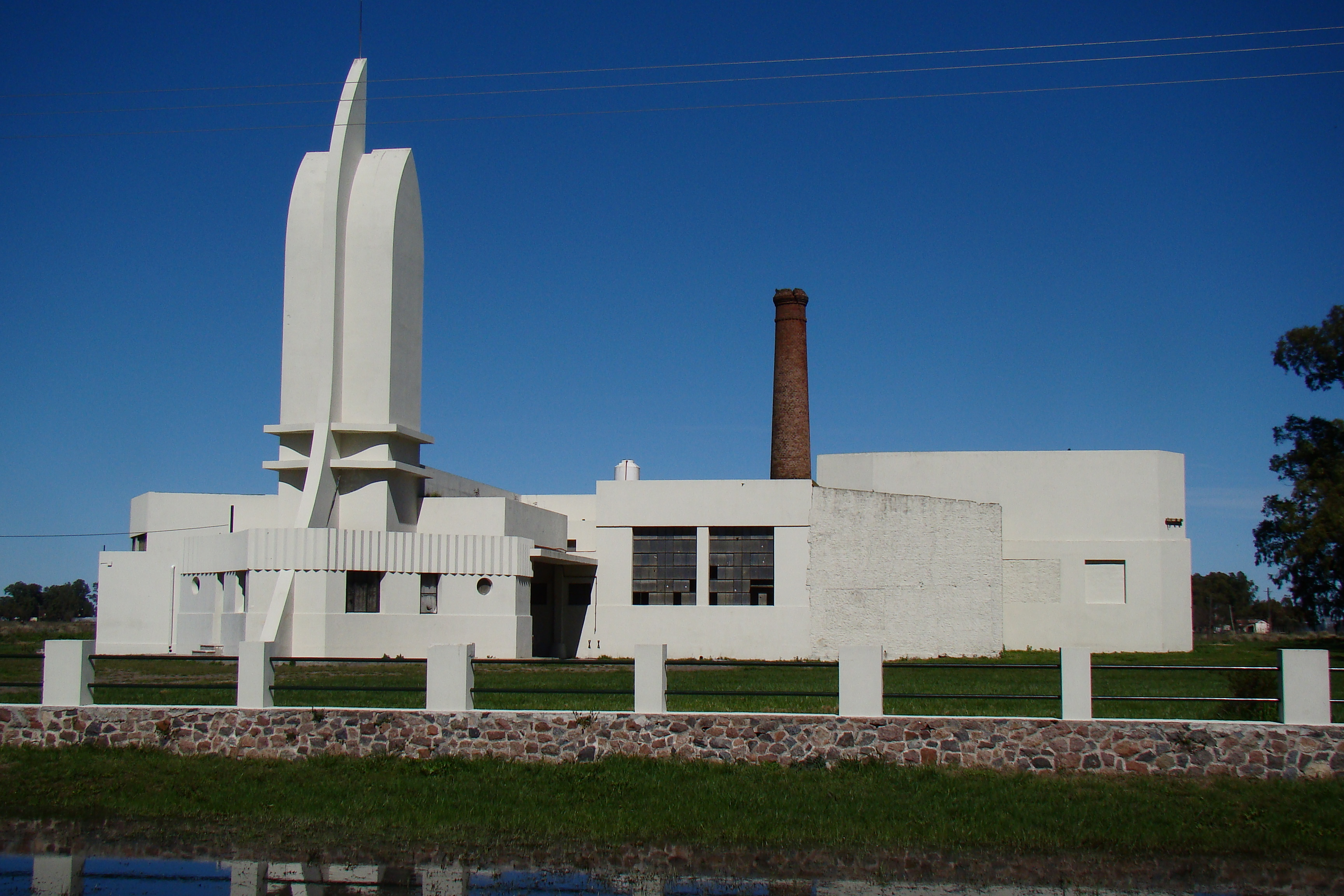
Azul slaughterhouse

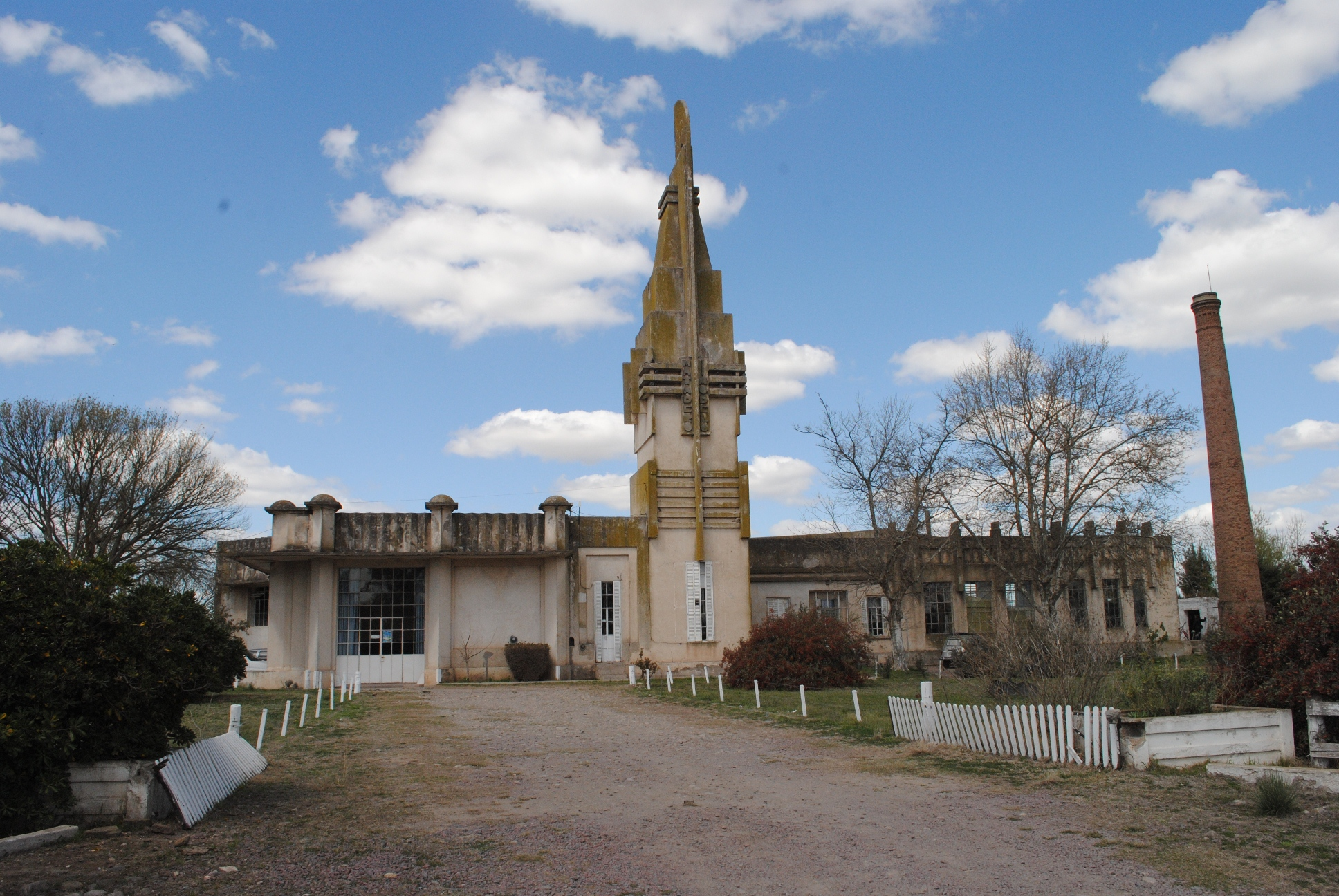
Coronel Pringles slaughterhouse

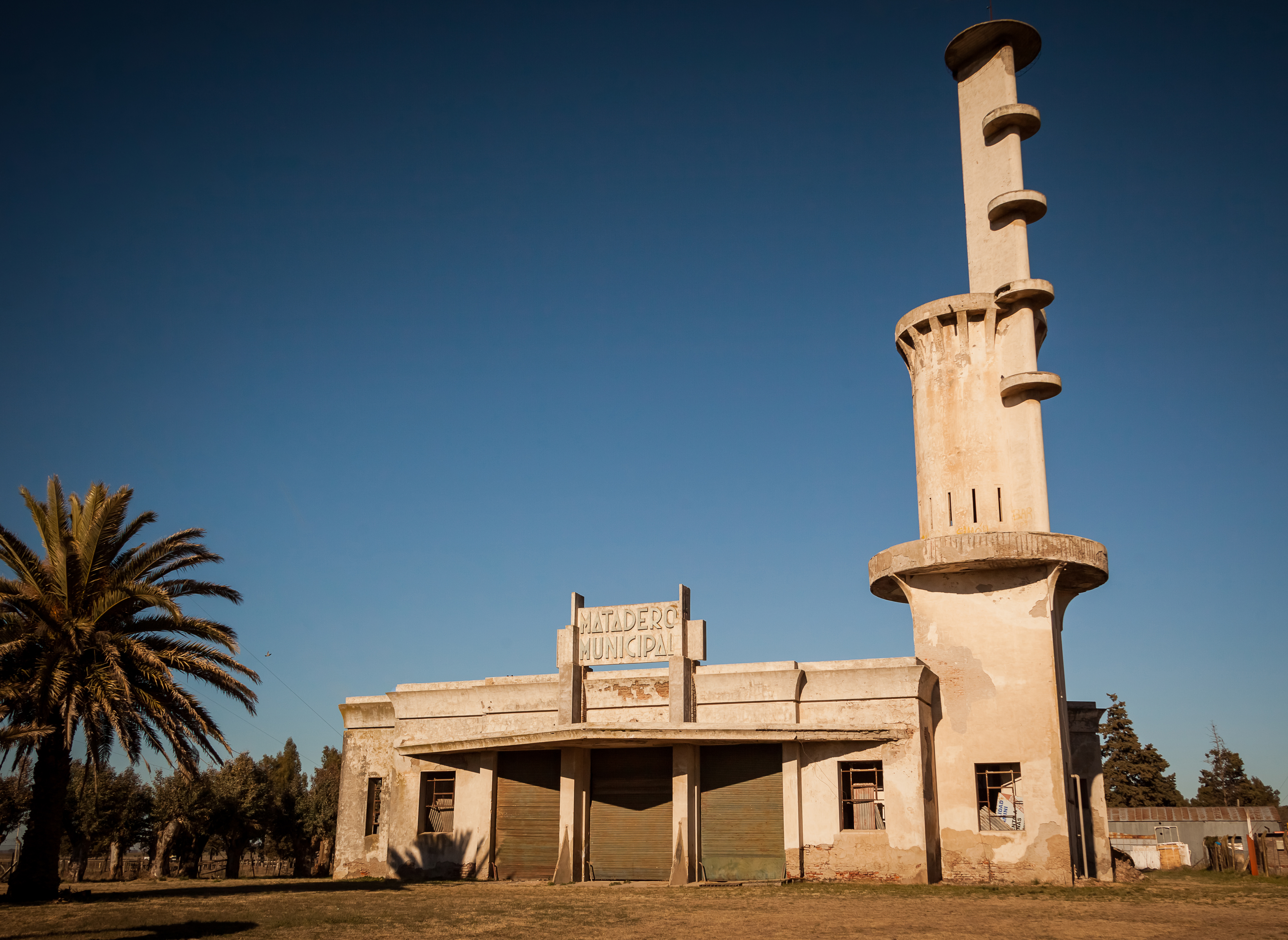
Guaminí slaughterhouse

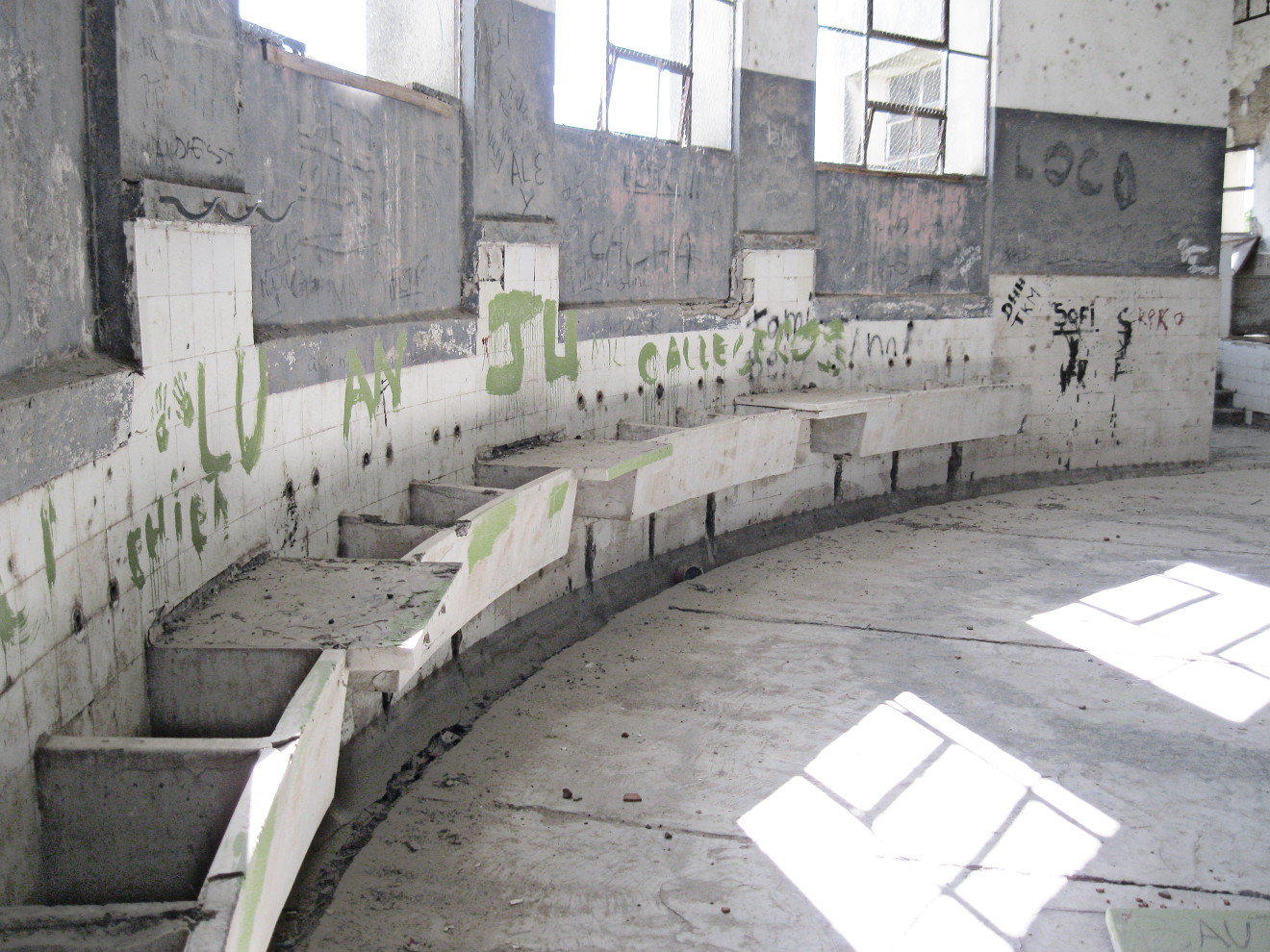
Guaminí slaughterhouse inside

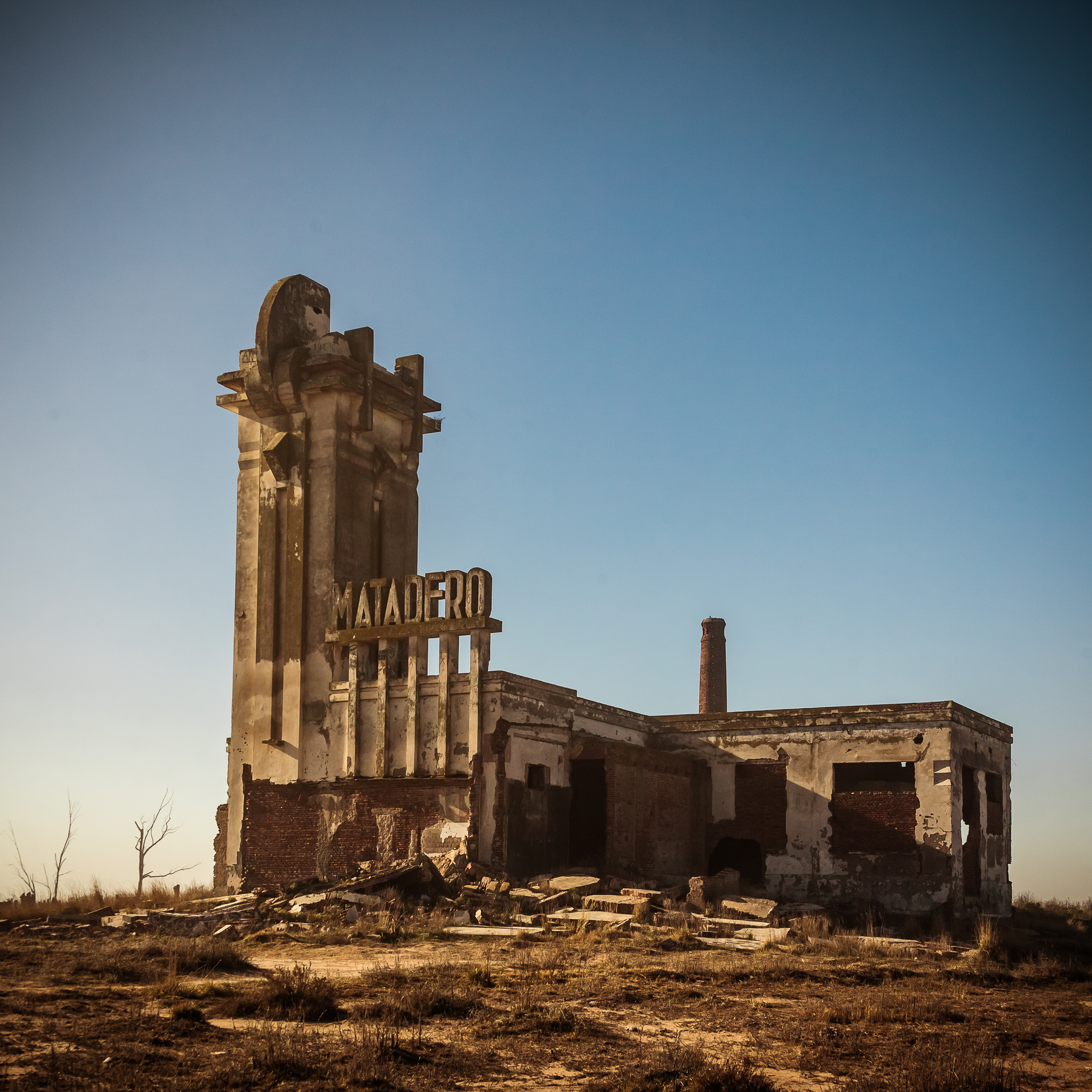
Villa Epecuén slaughterhouse

=== Cemetery portals ===
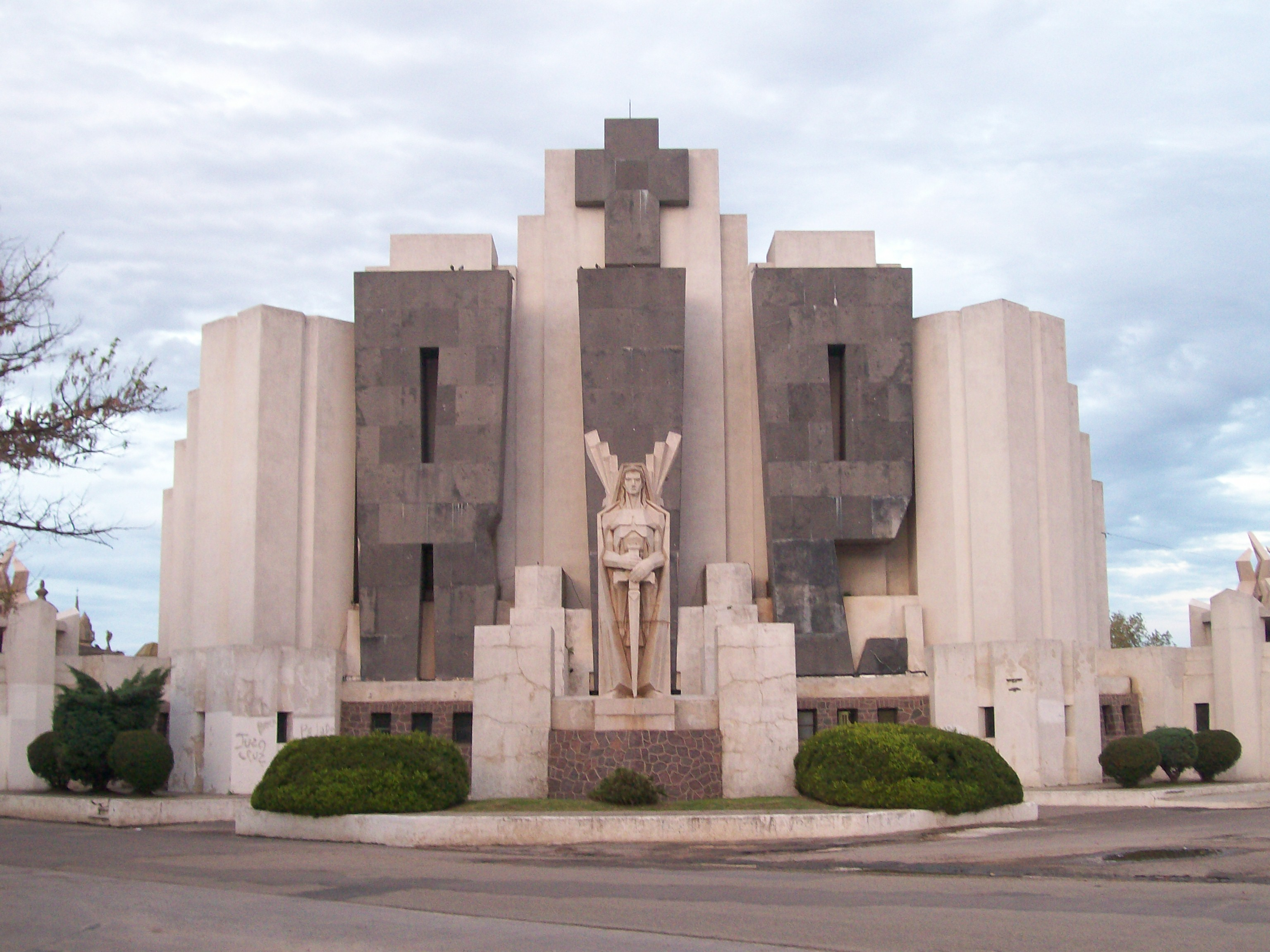
Azul cemetery

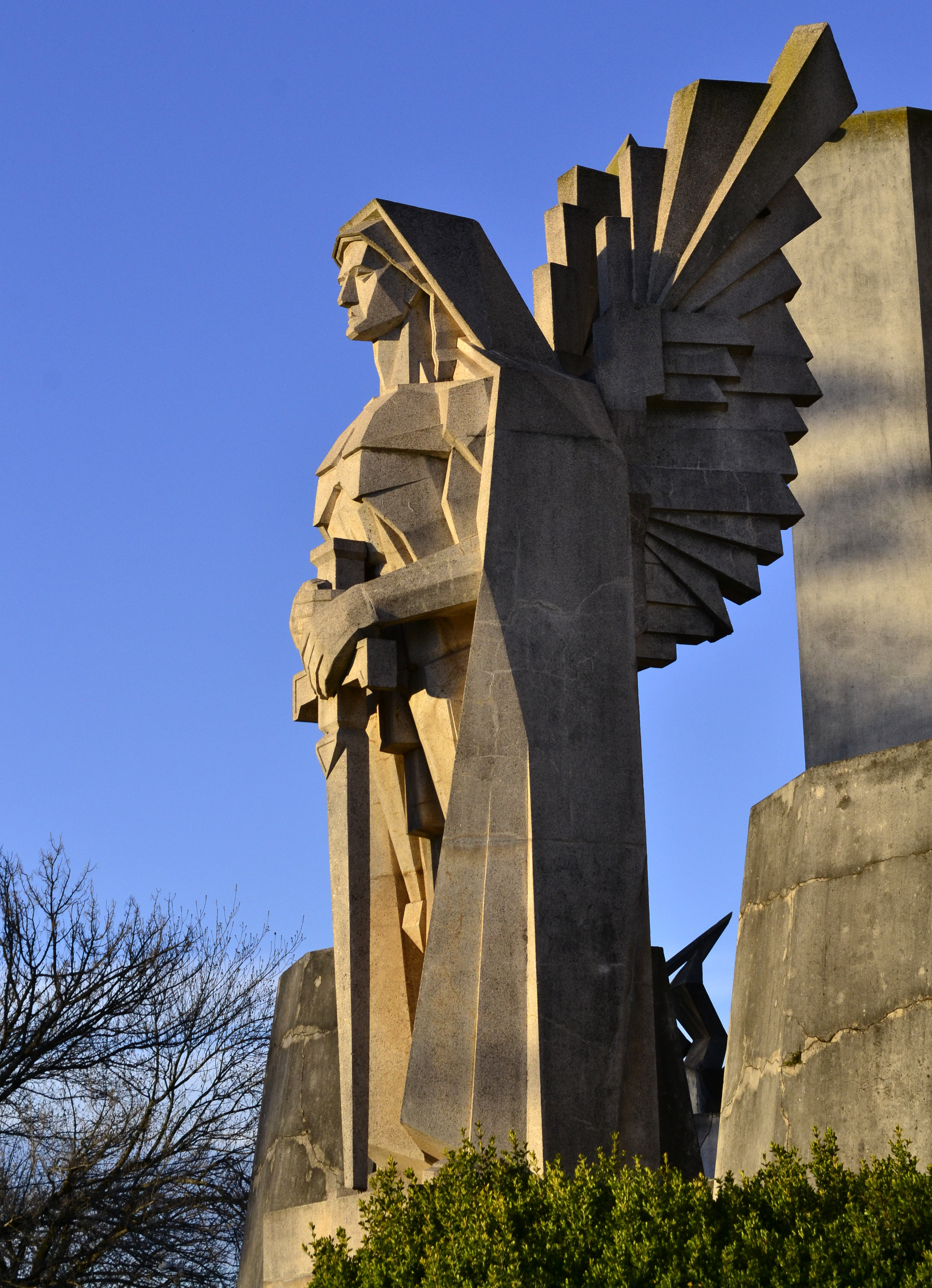
Angel in the Azul cemetery

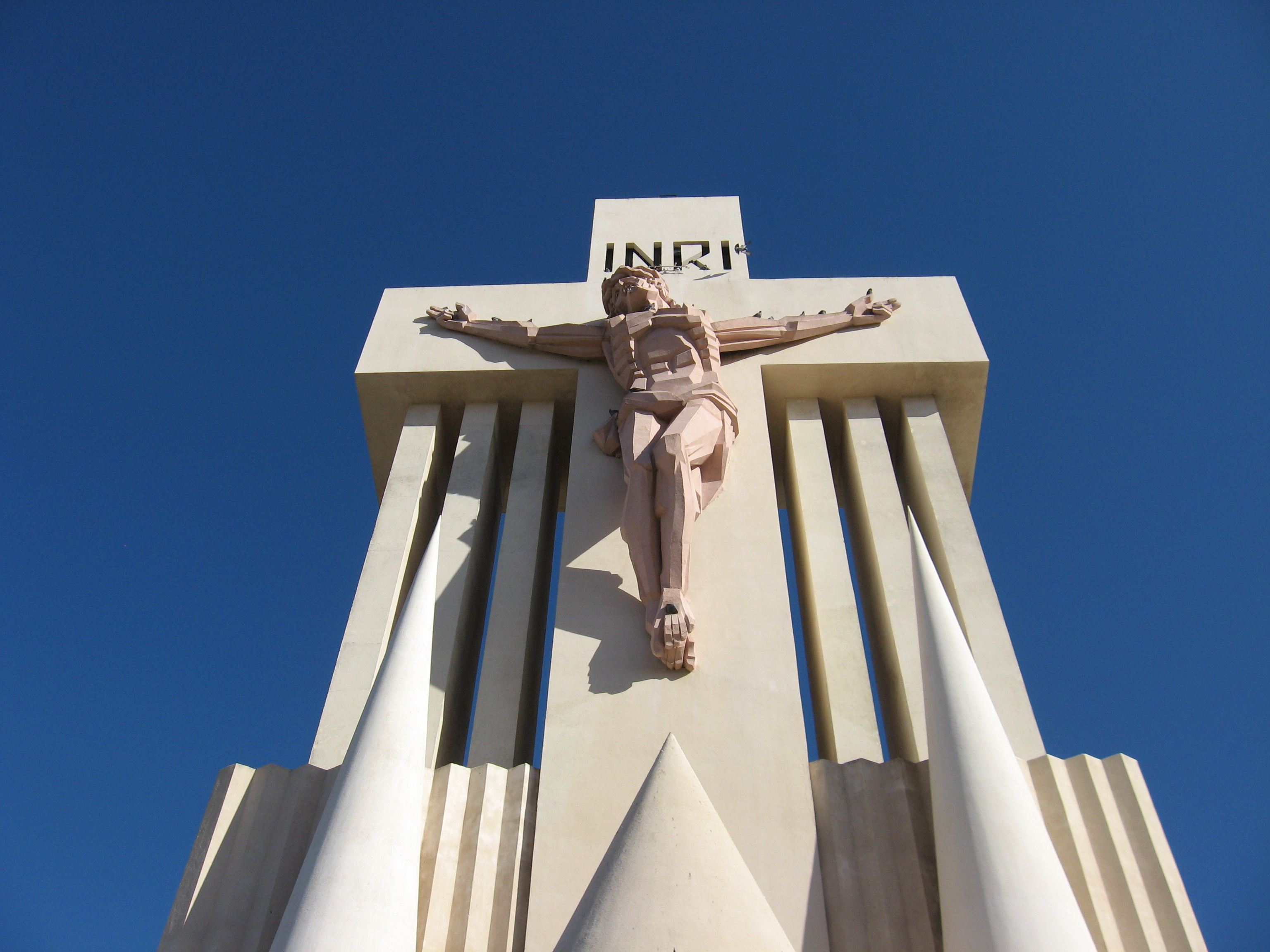
Laprida cemetery

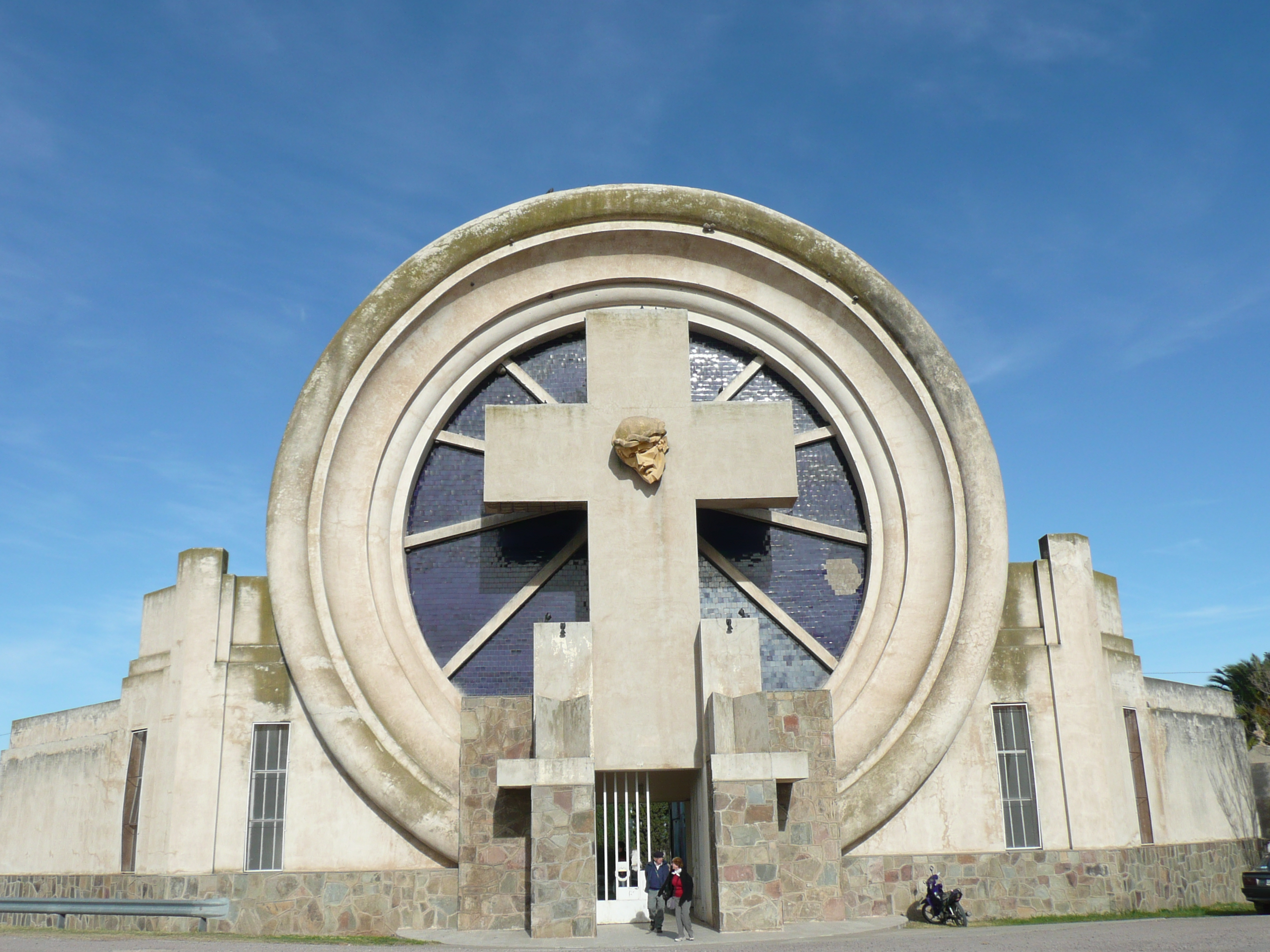
Saldungaray cemetery
