= Leandro N. Alem (disambiguation) =

Leandro N. Alem was an Argentine politician.

Leandro N. Alem may also refer to:

- Leandro N. Alem, Buenos Aires Province, Argentina
- Leandro N. Alem Partido, Buenos Aires Province, Argentina
- Leandro N. Alem, Misiones, Argentina
- Leandro N. Alem, San Luis, Argentina
- Leandro N. Alem Avenue, Buenos Aires, Argentina
- Leandro N. Alem (Buenos Aires Metro), a metro station in Buenos Aires, Argentina.
- Club Leandro N. Alem, an Argentine football club.
