= Kachari =

Kachari may refer to:

- Of or relating to the Cachar district, Assam in India
  - Kachari Kingdom, a former kingdom in Assam, India
  - Bodo-Kachari peoples, a number of ethnic groups in Assam, India
    - Kachari language, Tibeto-Burman language of Assam, India

== See also ==
- Ruins of Kachari Rajbari, in Dimapur, Nagaland, India
- Cacharí, Buenos Aires, in Argentina
