= Capital Department, Córdoba =

Capital Department Departamento Capital
- Department
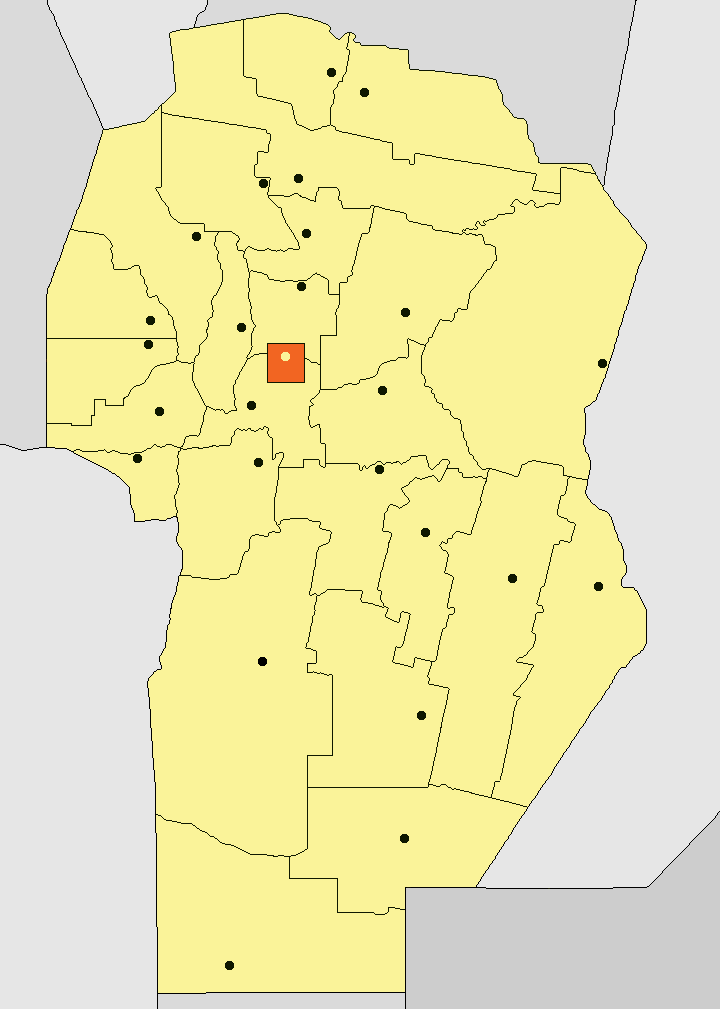
- Location of Capital Department in Córdoba Province
- Coordinates: 31°24′S 64°11′W
- Country: Argentina
- Province: Córdoba
- Foundation: 1868
- Capital: Córdoba

Area
  - Total: 576 km^{2} (222 sq mi)

Population (2022 census [INDEC])
  - Total: 1,505,250
  - Density: 2,610/km^{2} (6,770/sq mi)
  - Pop. change (2010-2022): +13.2 %
- Demonym: Cordobés/esa
- Time zone: UTC-3 (ART)
- Postal code: X5000
- Dialing code: 0351
- Distances to
- Buenos Aires: 710 km (440 mi)
- Córdoba: ?
- Website: www.cordoba.gov.ar

Capital Department is a department of Córdoba Province in Argentina, in which the provincial capital is located. Its boundaries create a square slightly off-center of the province. It is the only provincial department not sub-divided into districts, and while officially the city of Córdoba is the only municipality within the departmental limits, parts of other municipalities reach into it.

The department has a population of about 1,5 million inhabitants in an area of 562 km^{2}. Its capital city is Córdoba, which is also the capital city of Córdoba Province. It is located around 710 km from Buenos Aires.

== Location ==
The department is surrounded by the departments of Colón to the north, and Santa María to the south. In its laws, the province defines the limits through a series of straight lines on latitudes and longitudes.

Due to the square departmental limits, some of the neighboring towns and cities reach cross the departmental lines. This includes Estacion Juárez Celman, Saldán and Villa Allende in the north, which all are located in the Department Colón.

== Population ==
According to the 2022 census numbers of INDEC, the department has a population of 1.505.250, who live in around half a million households. Between 2010 and 2022, the population grew by 13 %.

Most of the population lives in a dense urban zone, with 98 % of households having access to the local water grid and 66 % having access to the gas network.

67 % of the population have health care coverage, around half the population has a degree. The literacy rate of the population is 99.8 %.
