= Villa Allende =

City in Córdoba Province, Argentina

Coordinates: 31°18′S 64°18′W

- City
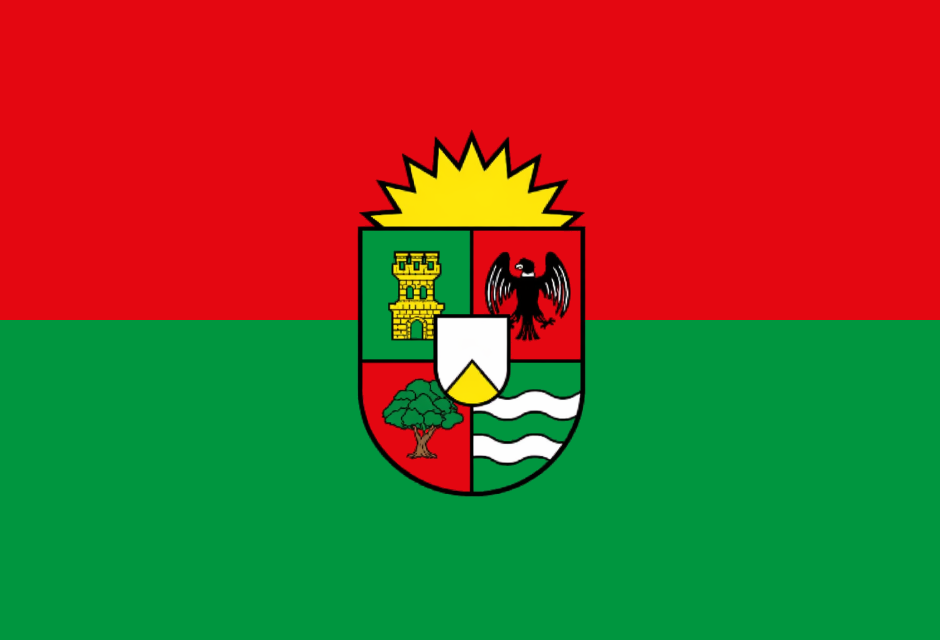
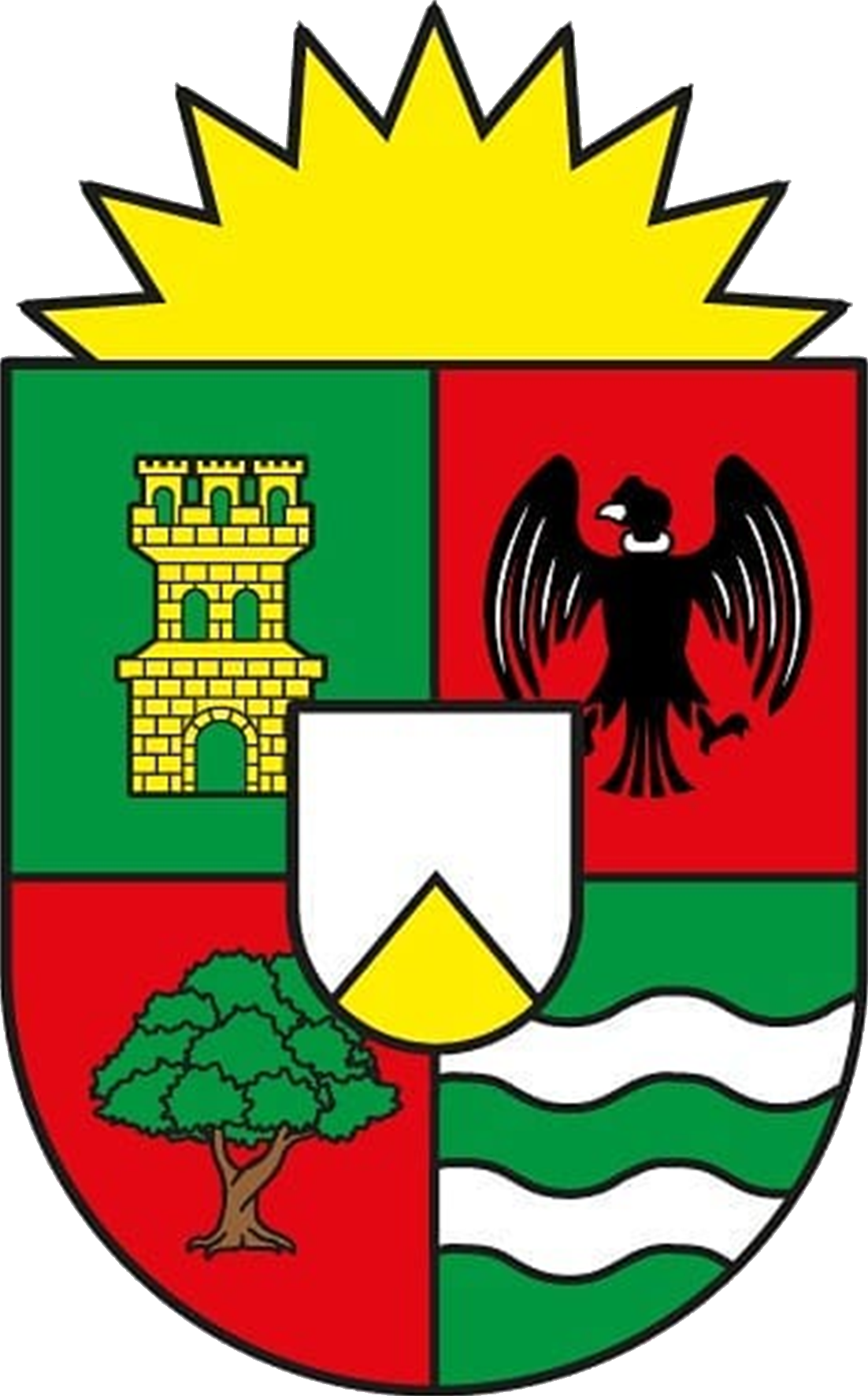
- Flag Seal
- Interactive map of Villa Allende

Population (2022)
  - Total: 36,722
- Website: www.villaallende.gov.ar

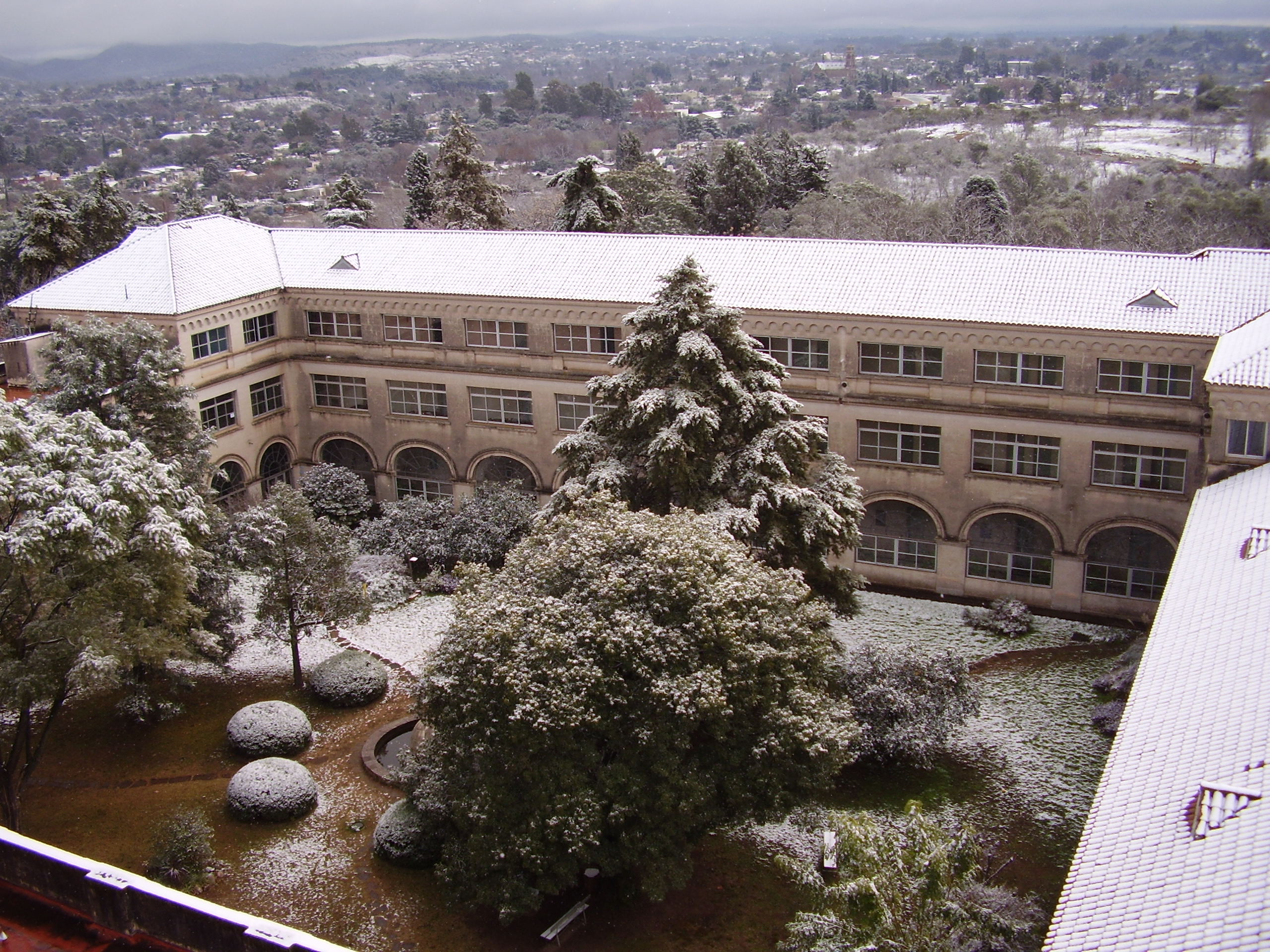
Villa Allende

Villa Allende is a city in Córdoba Province, Argentina, located mainly in the department of Colón, but bordering and reaching into the department Capital to the south, with the provincial capital Córdoba being located around 19 km to the south.

Villa Allende was founded in 1889 and around 36,000 inhabitants according to the 2022 census. The economy has strong ties with the capital city and is heavily dependent on tourism.

== Location ==
Villa Allende is connected to the capital through Av. Donato Álvarez, that starts in the neighbourhood of Argüello and reaches Av. Padre Luchesse that connects the city to the airport and where public construction finished in April 2026 to widen this main connection to Ruta Provincial E53.

The start of this road work in 2025 sparked a conflict due to the moving of a 300-old white quebracho. Public figures and environmental organisations opposed the proposal, but the municipality went ahead with the decision. The tree was transplanted to its new location in July 2025. In April 2026, the municipality updated the public about the tree having survived being moved, with the tree flowering again.

== Tourism ==
The town includes a number of destinations for tourists. This includes the Córdoba Golf Club, which is located in Villa Allende, and the Convento de San Alfonso, which turned 90 years old in 2025.

The town is also home to a number of buildings by the Italian architect, painter and photographer César Ferrari, who settled in Villa Allende in 1914. In addition to the church of Nuestra Señora del Carmen, he also built a series of residencies, including the "Castillo San Possidonio".
