= Chillar, Buenos Aires =

Chillar
- Town
- Location within Buenos Aires Province
- Coordinates: 37°18′S 59°59′W
- Country: Argentina
- Province: Buenos Aires
- Partidos: Azul
- Established: May 12, 1912
- Elevation: 270 m (890 ft)

Population (2001 Census)
  - Total: 3,332
- Time zone: UTC−3 (ART)
- CPA Base: B 7311
- Area code: +291 457-XXXX
- Climate: Dfc

Chillar is a town located in the Azul Partido in the province of Buenos Aires, Argentina.

== History ==
A railway station connecting what would be the town was established in 1911. The town was formally established in May of 1912. A church was constructed in Chillar in 1920.

== Economy ==
Chillar is primarily an agricultural community, with the area surrounding the town being used as farmland for crops, including wheat and soybeans.

== Population ==
Chillar had a population of 3,332 as of the 2001 census.
