= Juan Bautista Alberdi, Buenos Aires =

Juan Bautista Alberdi
- Town
- Location within Buenos Aires Province
- Coordinates: 34°26′S 61°48′W
- Country: Argentina
- Province: Buenos Aires
- Partidos: Leandro N. Alem
- Established: 1889
- Elevation: 77 m (253 ft)

Population (2001 Census)
  - Total: 3,430
- Time zone: UTC−3 (ART)
- CPA Base: B 6034
- Climate: Dfc

Juan Bautista Alberdi is a town located in the Leandro N. Alem Partido in the province of Buenos Aires Province, Argentina. The town is primarily famous for its gastronomy-based tourism. It is located along National Route 7, near the border with the province of Santa Fe.

== History ==
The town was founded in 1889, upon the construction of a railway station in the area. The village was named after Juan Bautista Alberdi, a political theorist who authored the Constitution of Argentina of 1853.

== Events ==
Juan B. Alberdi hosts an annual gastronomic celebration known as the Provincial Flour Festival, involving the creation of large sandwiches and other flour-based foods, one of which, measuring at 2.8 m (9 ft 2 in), has been considered the largest sandwich made in Argentina.

== Population ==
According to INDEC, which collects population data for the country, the town had a population of 3,430 people as of the 2001 census. By the 2022 census, the town's population had risen to 4,087.
