= Vedia, Buenos Aires =

Vedia
- Location in Argentina
- Coordinates: 34°40′S 61°33′W
- Country: Argentina
- Province: Buenos Aires
- Partido: Leandro N. Alem
- Founded: 23 May 1885
- Elevation: 87 m (285 ft)

Population (2001 census [INDEC])
  - Total: 8,089
- CPA Base: B 6030
- Area code: +54 02354

Vedia is a town, created in 1913, in the far northwestern part of Buenos Aires Province, Argentina. It is the administrative centre for Leandro N. Alem Partido.

The town is named after the Argentine military leader Julio de Vedia.
