= Casbas, Buenos Aires =

Casbas
- Town
- Location within Buenos Aires Province
- Coordinates: 36°45′S 62°30′W
- Country: Argentina
- Province: Buenos Aires
- Partidos: Guaminí
- Established: November 11, 1911
- Elevation: 115 m (377 ft)

Population (2001 Census)
  - Total: 4,108
- Time zone: UTC−3 (ART)
- CPA Base: B 6417
- Climate: Dfc

Casbas is a town located in the Guaminí Partido in the province of Buenos Aires, Argentina.

== Geography ==
Casbas is located 490 km (300 mi) from the city of Buenos Aires.

== History ==
Casbas was founded on November 11, 1911, on land owned by a family of the same surname. Casbas was situated on a rail line between Buenos Aires and Carhué. The town was settled by large numbers of Italian immigrants.

== Population ==
According to INDEC, which collects population data for the country, the town had a population of 4,108 people as of the 2001 census.
