= Pellegrini, Buenos Aires =

Pellegrini
- Location in Buenos Aires Province Pellegrini (Argentina)
- Coordinates: 36°16′S 63°08′W
- Country: Argentina
- Province: Buenos Aires
- Partido: Pellegrini
- Elevation: 105 m (344 ft)

Population (2001 census [INDEC])
  - Total: 5,031
- CPA Base: B 6349
- Area code: +54 2392

Pellegrini is a town on the western border of Buenos Aires Province, Argentina. It is the head town of the Pellegrini Partido.

The town is named in honour of Carlos Pellegrini (1846-1906), who served as Governor of Buenos Aires, and as President of Argentina.

== Economy ==
The local economy is dominated by agriculture and farming, the main products of the region are cereals, vegetable oils, beef, dairy products, pork, deer and honey. Other industries include construction and services.

Instituto Nacional de Tecnología Agropecuaria has a campus in Pellegrini.
