= Guaminí =

- Location in Argentina
- Coordinates: 37°01′S 62°25′W
- Country: Argentina
- Province: Buenos Aires
- Partido: Guaminí
- Founded: March 28, 1883 (formal)
- Elevation: 95 m (312 ft)

Population (2001 census [INDEC])
  - Total: 2,704
- CPA Base: B 6432
- Area code: +54 2929

Guaminí is the capital of Guaminí Partido in Buenos Aires Province, Argentina.

== History ==
The area was first occupied by Europeans during the Conquest of the Desert. The first settlement in the location was founded on March 30, 1876, and called Santa María de Guaminí. On March 28, 1883, the settlement was officially founded with the name Guaminí.
