= Azul Partido =

Azul Partido de Azul
- Department
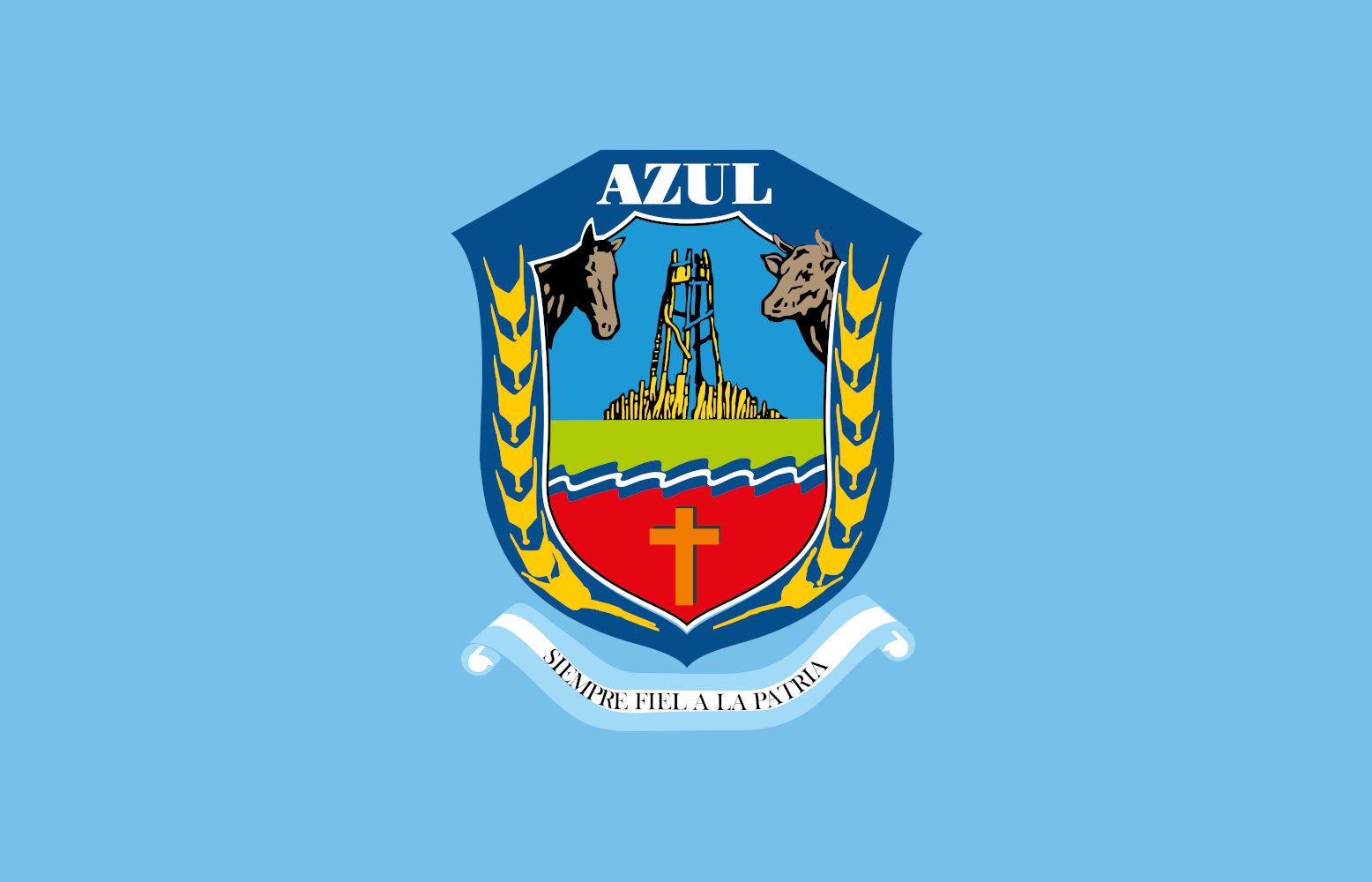
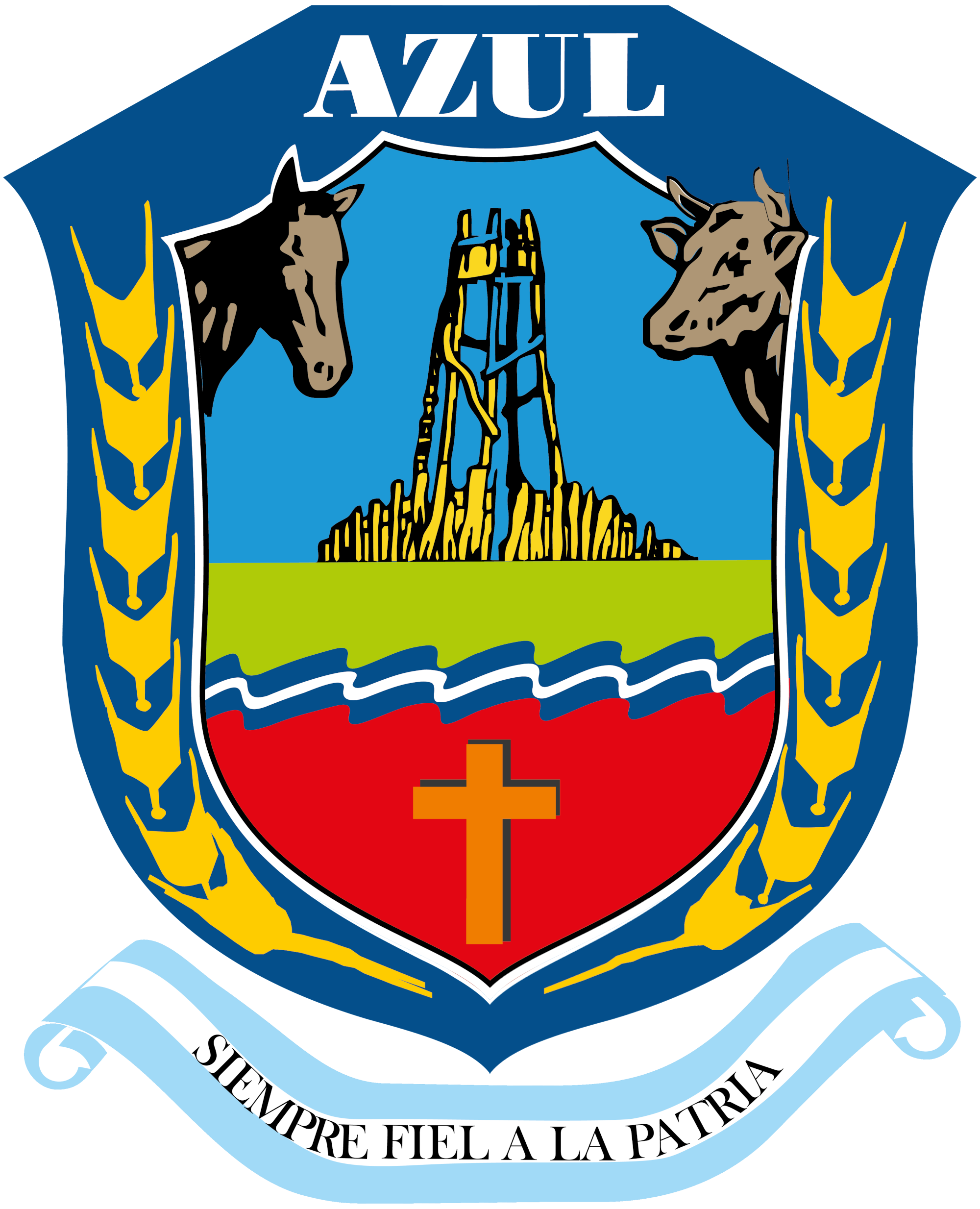
- Flag Coat of arms

- Location of Azul in Buenos Aires Province
- Coordinates: 36°48′S 59°51′W
- Country: Argentina
- Province: Buenos Aires
- Established: December 16, 1832
- Founder: Colonel Pedro Burgos
- Seat: Azul

Government
  - Intendant: Nelson Sombra (PJ)

Area
  - Total: 6,615 km^{2} (2,554 sq mi)

Population
  - Total: 62,996
  - Density: 9.523/km^{2} (24.66/sq mi)
- Demonym: azuleño
- Postal Code: B7300
- IFAM: BUE007
- Area Code: 02281
- Website: http://www.azul.mun.gba.gov.ar/

Azul is a central partido of Buenos Aires Province in Argentina.

The provincial subdivision has a population of 62,996 inhabitants in an area of 6,615 km^{2} (2,554 sq mi), and its capital city is Azul, which is around 298 km (185 mi) from Buenos Aires.

The province was founded on December 16, 1832, and the people are known as Azuleños.

== Settlements ==
- Azul
- 16 de Julio
- Pablo Acosta
- Ariel
- Arroyo de los Huesos
- Cacharí
- Chillar
- Lazzarino
- Martín Fierro
- Miramonte
- Nieves
- Parish y Shaw
