= Laprida, Buenos Aires =

Laprida
- Location in Argentina
- Coordinates: 37°32′S 60°49′W
- Country: Argentina
- Province: Buenos Aires
- Partido: Laprida
- Founded: 16 September 1889
- Elevation: 209 m (686 ft)

Population (2001 census [INDEC])
  - Total: 8,178
- CPA Base: B 7414
- Area code: +54 2285

Laprida is a town in Buenos Aires Province, Argentina. It is the administrative centre for Laprida Partido.

== Attractions ==
- Museo Archivo Histórico Hugo H. Diez (Hugo Diez Museum & Historical archive)
- Laguna El Paraíso, lake, located 4 km from the city, a popular summer resorts on the region.
