= Cacharí, Buenos Aires =

Cacharí
- Town
- Location within Buenos Aires Province
- Coordinates: 36°24′S 59°32′W
- Country: Argentina
- Province: Buenos Aires
- Partidos: Bahía Blanca
- Established: September 16, 1896
- Elevation: 71 m (233 ft)

Population (2001 Census)
  - Total: 2,968
- Time zone: UTC−3 (ART)
- CPA Base: B 7330
- Area code: +54 2281
- Climate: Dfc

Cacharí is a town located in the Azul Partido in the province of Buenos Aires, Argentina. As of 2001, the town had a population of 2,968.

== Geography ==
Cacharí is located 60 km (37 mi) from the regional capital of Azul.

== History ==
Cacharí was founded in September 1896. The community was established by Don Mariano Falomir, who owned land in the region.

Sewage in the town would formerly be dumped around 400 m (1,300 ft) from the community, resulting in the town's water supply being polluted. This ended in 1998.
