= Rauch, Buenos Aires =

Rauch
- Coat of arms

- Location in Argentina
- Coordinates: 36°46′S 59°06′W
- Country: Argentina
- Province: Buenos Aires
- Partido: Rauch
- Founded: 19 July 1865
- Elevation: 87 m (285 ft)

Population (2001 census [INDEC])
  - Total: 11,483
- CPA Base: B 7203
- Area code: +54 2297

Rauch is a town in Buenos Aires Province, Argentina. It is the administrative headquarters for Rauch Partido.

In 1829, the "combate de Las Vizcacheras" (part of the Argentine Civil War) was fought in Rauch.
