= Santa María Department, Córdoba =

Santa María Department Departamento Santa María
- Department
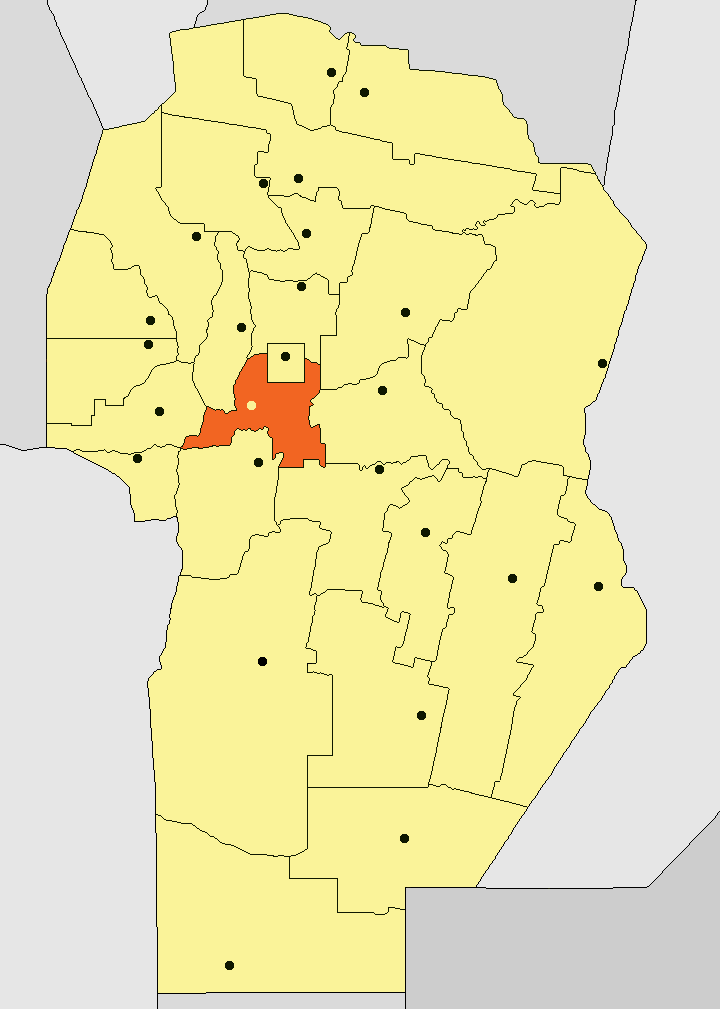
- Location of Santa María Department in Córdoba Province
- Coordinates: 31°39′S 64°25′W
- Country: Argentina
- Province: Córdoba
- Capital: Alta Gracia

Area
  - Total: 3,427 km^{2} (1,323 sq mi)

Population (2001 census [INDEC])
  - Total: 86,083
  - Density: 25.12/km^{2} (65.06/sq mi)
  - Pop. change (1991-2001): +7.63%
- Time zone: UTC-3 (ART)
- Postal code: X5186
- Dialing code: 03547
- Distances to
- Buenos Aires: 747 km (464 mi)
- Córdoba: 39 km (24 mi)

Santa María Department is a department of Córdoba Province in Argentina.

The provincial subdivision has a population of about 86,083 inhabitants in an area of 3,427 km^{2}, and its capital city is Alta Gracia, which is located around 747 km from the Capital federal.

== Settlements ==
- Alta Gracia
- Anisacate
- Bower
- Despeñaderos
- Dique Chico
- Falda del Carmen
- La Paisanita
- La Rancherita
- La Serranita
- Los Cedros
- Lozada
- Malagueño
- Monte Ralo
- Potrero de Garay
- Rafael García
- San Clemente
- Toledo
- Valle de Anisacate
- Villa Ciudad de América
- Villa del Prado
- Villa La Bolsa
- Villa Los Aromos
- Villa Parque Santa Ana
- Villa San Isidro

== Attractions ==
The Jesuit Block and Estancias of Córdoba World Heritage Site is located in Alta Gracia.
