= Laprida Partido =

Laprida Partido de Laprida
- Department
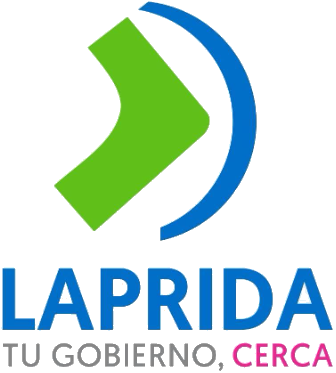
- Flag Logo

- location of Laprida Partido in Buenos Aires Province
- Coordinates: 36°02′S 59°06′W
- Country: Argentina
- Established: September 16, 1889
- Seat: Laprida

Government
  - Intendant: Alfredo Fisher (PJ)

Area
  - Total: 3,340 km^{2} (1,290 sq mi)

Population
  - Total: 9,683
  - Density: 2.90/km^{2} (7.51/sq mi)
- Demonym: lapridense
- Postal Code: B7414
- IFAM: BUE068
- Area Code: 02285
- Website: laprida.gov.ar

Laprida Partido is a partido in central Buenos Aires Province in Argentina.

The provincial subdivision has a population of about 9,600 inhabitants in an area of 3,340 km^{2} (1,290 sq mi). Its capital city is Laprida, 480 km (298 mi) from Buenos Aires on the Ferrocarril General Roca railway line to Olavarría and on provincial routes RP 51, RP 75, RP 76 and RP 86. It sits on fertile pampas land, and its main economy is agriculture.

It is named after Francisco Narciso Laprida, president of the Congreso de Tucumán, and co-signer of Argentina's Independence Declaration in 1816.

== Geography ==
=== Climate ===
==== Temperature ====
Laprida's climate is humid-temperate, with an average temperature of 22 °C (72 °F) in summer (average max. 30 °C (86 °F)), and 6 °C (43 °F) in winter (average min. 1 °C (33.8 °F)), with an annual mean of 14 °C (57 °F).

Relative humidity is 60%, with the most humid month being July with 67%, and the driest in December at 50%.

==== Rain ====
The area is catalogued as subhumid-dry, with a record high yearly precipitation in 1980 at 1,268 mm (49.9 in) (although this record was beaten 2006), annual monthly media of 88 mm (3.5 in) with a tendency to reach 900 mm (35.4 in) (858 mm (33.8 in) in 1996).

During dry cycles, the wet season is summer, with March being the wettest month at 106 mm (4.2 in) of precipitation and August being the driest month with an average of 32 mm (1.3 in). During humid cycles, the wet season moves to the end of spring (October and November).

==== Soil ====
Laprida Partido is on an extended plain with low wavy terrain in areas, and no rivers or streams, but with a few small lakes and no flooding areas. The soil is mainly alkaline with low permeability and low vegetation, and is apt for agriculture.

===== Relief =====
It sits on Pampa Deprimida ("low pampas"), from the Río Salado, but in a higher topographic zone, along with the Partidos of General Lamadrid and Benito Juárez.

== Basque presence in Laprida ==
The Basques have been an important immigration group since the foundation of the partido and the city, working mainly in agriculture and cattle raising, commerce and services.

== Towns and settlements ==
- Laprida
- Pueblo San Jorge
- Pueblo Nuevo
- Colonia Artalejo
- Las Hermanas
- Paragüil
- Santa Elena
- Voluntad
