= Rauch Partido =

Rauch Partido de Rauch
- Department
- Coat of arms

- location of Rauch Partido in Buenos Aires Province
- Coordinates: 36°46′S 59°06′W
- Country: Argentina
- Established: July 1865
- Founder: provincial law
- Seat: Rauch

Government
  - Intendant: Roberto Suescún (UCR)

Area
  - Total: 4,300 km^{2} (1,700 sq mi)

Population
  - Total: 14,434
  - Density: 3.4/km^{2} (8.7/sq mi)
- Demonym: rauchense
- Postal Code: B7203
- IFAM: BUE103
- Area Code: 2297
- Patron saint: San Pedro Apóstol
- Website: www.rauch.mun.gba.gov.ar

Rauch Partido is a partido in the centre-east of Buenos Aires Province in Argentina.

The provincial subdivision has a population of about 14,000 inhabitants in an area of 4,300 km^{2} (1,700 sq mi), and its capital city is Rauch.

== Settlements ==
- Rauch: 12.495 inhabitants
- Miranda: 80 inhabitants
- Egaña: 44 inhabitants
- Colman: 27 inhabitants
