= Leandro N. Alem, Buenos Aires =

Leandro N. Alem
- Town
- Location in Argentina
- Coordinates: 34°30′S 61°23′W
- Country: Argentina
- Province: Buenos Aires
- Partido: Leandro N. Alem
- Elevation: 70 m (230 ft)

Population (2001 census [INDEC])
  - Total: 2,541
- CPA Base: B 6032
- Area code: +54 2362

Leandro N. Alem is a town in the province of Buenos Aires, Argentina, and the only municipality forming the partido (department) of the same name. At the 2001 census [INDEC] it had a population of 16,358 inhabitants.

The city is named after Leandro Alem (1844–1896), one of the founders of the Radical Civic Union.
