= Guaminí Partido =

Guaminí Partido de Guaminí
- Department
- location of Guaminí Partido in Buenos Aires Province
- Coordinates: 37°00′S 62°24′W
- Country: Argentina
- Established: July 28, 1886
- Founder: provincial law 1827
- Seat: Guaminí

Government
  - Intendant: José Augusto Nobre Ferreira (PJ)

Area
  - Total: 4,840 km^{2} (1,870 sq mi)

Population
  - Total: 11,257
  - Density: 2.33/km^{2} (6.02/sq mi)
- Demonym: guaminense
- Postal Code: B6435
- IFAM: BUE058
- Area Code: 02929
- Website: http://guamini.gov.ar/

Guaminí Partido is a partido in the west of Buenos Aires Province in Argentina.

The provincial subdivision has a population of about 11,000 inhabitants in an area of 4,840 km^{2} (1,869 sq mi), and its capital city is Guaminí, which is 492 km (306 mi) from Buenos Aires.

== Economy ==
The economy of Guaminí partido is dominated by the cultivation of wheat, maize, soya beans, sunflowers, alfalfa, sorghum and oats.

Other industries include beef and dairy farming and related farming services.

== Settlements ==
- Arroyo Venado
- Casbas
- Garré
- Guaminí
- Huanguelén
- Laguna Alsina
