= Chascomús Partido =

Administrative region in Argentina

Chascomús Partido de Chascomús
- Department

- Location in Buenos Aires Province
- Country: Argentina
- Established: 1801
- Founder: Pedro Nicolás Escribano
- Seat: Chascomús

Government
  - Intendant: Javier Gastón (UNA)

Area
  - Total: 4,225 km^{2} (1,631 sq mi)

Population
  - Total: 38,647
  - Density: 9.147/km^{2} (23.69/sq mi)
- Demonym: chascomusense
- Postal Code: B7130
- IFAM: BUE025
- Area Code: 02241
- Patron saint: Our Lady of Mercy
- Website: chascomus.gob.ar

Chascomús is an east central partido (administrative district) of the Province of Buenos Aires in Argentina. Some 110 km (68 mi) south-southeast of the city of Buenos Aires, the district has a total population of around 37,000, some 35,000 of whom live in Chascomús city, the capital of the district.

== History ==
The partido was founded in 1801, by Pedro Nicolás Escribano.

== Economy ==
Chascomús, like most of Buenos Aires province, has many beef cattle and dairy farms. Agricultural produce from the area includes maize, wheat, barley, oats, soya beans, and sorghum, while apiculture also plays a role in the local economy.

The district also has a strong industrial sector, producing dairy products, textiles and agricultural machinery.

The tourist industry in Chascomús is mainly dominated by weekend tourism from Greater Buenos Aires.

== Settlements ==
- Adela
- Atilio Pessagno
- Chascomús (capital)
- Comandante Giribone
- Don Cipriano
- Gandara
- Libres del Sud
- Manuel Jose Cobo
- Monasterio
- Paraje El Destino
- Pedro Nicolás Escribano
