= Pellegrini Partido =

Pellegrini Partido de Carlos Pellegrini
- Department
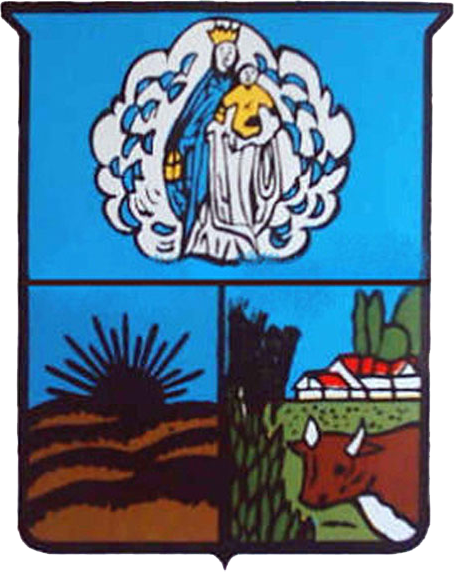
- Flag Coat of arms

- location of Pellegrini Partido in Buenos Aires Province
- Coordinates: 36°16′S 63°08′W
- Country: Argentina
- Established: 1899
- Founder: ?
- Seat: Pellegrini

Government
  - Intendant: Sofía Gambier (UCR)

Area
  - Total: 1,820 km^{2} (700 sq mi)

Population
  - Total: 6,030
  - Density: 3.31/km^{2} (8.58/sq mi)
- Demonym: pellegrinense
- Postal Code: B6349
- IFAM: BUE093
- Area Code: 02392
- Patron saint: ?
- Website: www.pellegrini.gov.ar

Pellegrini Partido is a partido on the western border of Buenos Aires Province in Argentina.

The provincial subdivision has a population of about 6,000 inhabitants in an area of 1,820 km^{2} (700 sq mi), and its capital city is Pellegrini, which is around 490 km (300 mi) from Buenos Aires.

== Name ==
The Partido is named in honour of Carlos Pellegrini, who served as Governor of Buenos Aires, and as President of Argentina.

== Settlements ==
- Pellegrini
- De Bary
- Bocayuva
