= Leandro N. Alem Partido =

Leandro N. Alem Partido de Leandro Nicéforo Alem
- Department
- location of Leandro Alem in Buenos Aires Province
- Coordinates: 34°30′S 61°29′W
- Country: Argentina
- Established: October 8, 1918
- Founder: provincial law 3665
- Seat: Vedia

Government
  - Intendant: Carlos Ferraris (Justicialist Party)

Area
  - Total: 1,603 km^{2} (619 sq mi)

Population
  - Total: 16,358
  - Density: 10.20/km^{2} (26.43/sq mi)
- Demonym: alemense
- Postal Code: B6030
- IFAM: BUE070
- Area Code: 02354

Leandro N. Alem Partido is a partido in the north of Buenos Aires Province in Argentina.

The provincial subdivision has a population of about 16,000 inhabitants in an area of 1,603 km^{2} (619 sq mi), and its capital city is Vedia, which is 329 km (204 mi) from Buenos Aires.

== Name ==
The Partido is named in honour of Leandro Nicéforo Alem, an Argentine politician, founder of the Radical Civic Union political party, and mentor to Hipólito Yrigoyen, who became President of Argentina.

== Settlements ==
- Vedia (pop. 8,089)
- Leandro N. Alem (pop. 16,358)
- Juan Bautista Alberdi
- Alberdi Viejo (pop. 336)
- El Dorado (pop. 316)
- Fortín Acha (pop. 93)
- Perkins (pop. 2,430)
- Trigales
