= Provincial Route 2 (Buenos Aires) =

Highway in Argentina

Provincial Route 2
- Ruta provincial 2
- Autovía 2 Juan Manuel Fangio

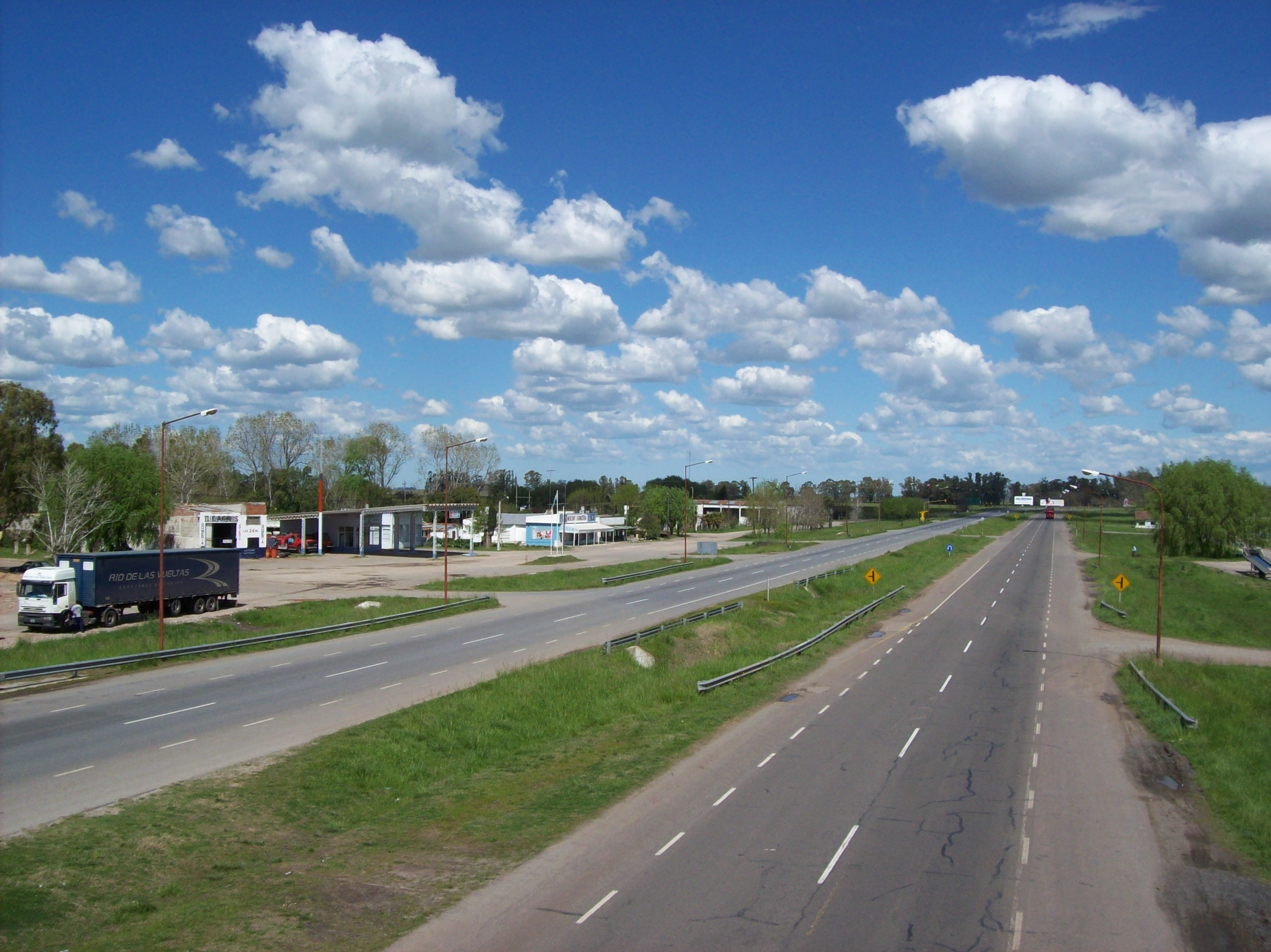
- Autovía 2 passing the town of Las Armas, south direction

Route information
- Maintained by AUBASA
- Length: 370 km (230 mi)
- Existed: 23 January 1938; 88 years ago –present

Major junctions
- North end: Florencio Varela
- NR A004,,,,,,,,,,,,,,
- South end: Mar del Plata

Location
- Country: Argentina
- Major cities: Chascomús, Lezama, Castelli, Dolores, General Guido, Coronel Vidal

Highway system
- Highways in Argentina

Autovía 2 Juan Manuel Fangio (also known as Provincial Route 2, formerly National Route 2) is an Argentine dual carriageway, which runs from Buenos Aires to Mar del Plata. The road was a National Route until 1990 when it was transferred to the Government of Buenos Aires Province. The Autovía 2 extends from the junction of Provincial Routes 1 and 36 and National Route A004, just on the traffic circle "Juan María Gutiérrez", which is the limit of Berazategui and Florencio Varela districts.

Autovía 2 has two toll booths, one in Samborombón and another in Maipú. The entire road is currently managed by State-owned company "Autopistas de Buenos Aires S.A.", also known for its acronym "AUBASA". More than 30 fuel stations are placed on the route in its entirety. The route has also numerous phone posts to call in case of emergency. Another service is an FM radio station which gives reports about the conditions of the route.

Almost all the intersections with other roads are level crossings, without bridges to prevent accidents. There are also two railroad level crossings with General Roca Railway tracks.

== Overview ==
This autovía has a North-South direction. It begins in the Rotonda Gutiérrez, where many important roads converge: Provincial Route 36, National Route A004, which connects to NR 1 (also known as Autopista Buenos Aires-La Plata), the fastest option to access to the city of Buenos Aires. There is a bridge over the traffic circle that joins the NR A004 with Autovía 2.

Some interesting points are the Chascomús Lake (distant 300 m from the Autovía), the Autódromo Roberto José Mouras (a motor racing circuit named in memory of a famous Argentine racer), the industrial park of La Plata and the Chis-Chis Lake, famous for its fishing activities. In the city of Lezama the Autovía becomes an urban street, crossing the center of the city along the railroad station. After passing Lezama the Autovía becomes a road again.

At the south of Salado River, the route passes near to Estancia Villa La Raquel, a huge land with a castle built by the Guerrero family in Castelli Partido during the 19th century. This property is currently used for tourism Autovía 2 also passes near to the city of Dolores, next to Autódromo Ciudad de Dolores. At the south of General Guido, in the km 251, there is a railroad crossing with the General Roca branch-line to General Madariaga, although the service has been inactive since 2015, due to flooding of the Salado River.

In the city of Maipú, town's streets converge to the route. In Estación Camet, the urban zone of Mar del Plata begins. The road then passes Astor Piazzolla International Airport and after a traffic circle in km 400, the Autovía becomes a boulevard. Between this point and the end of the road, there is another new railroad crossing.

== History ==
=== The beginning ===
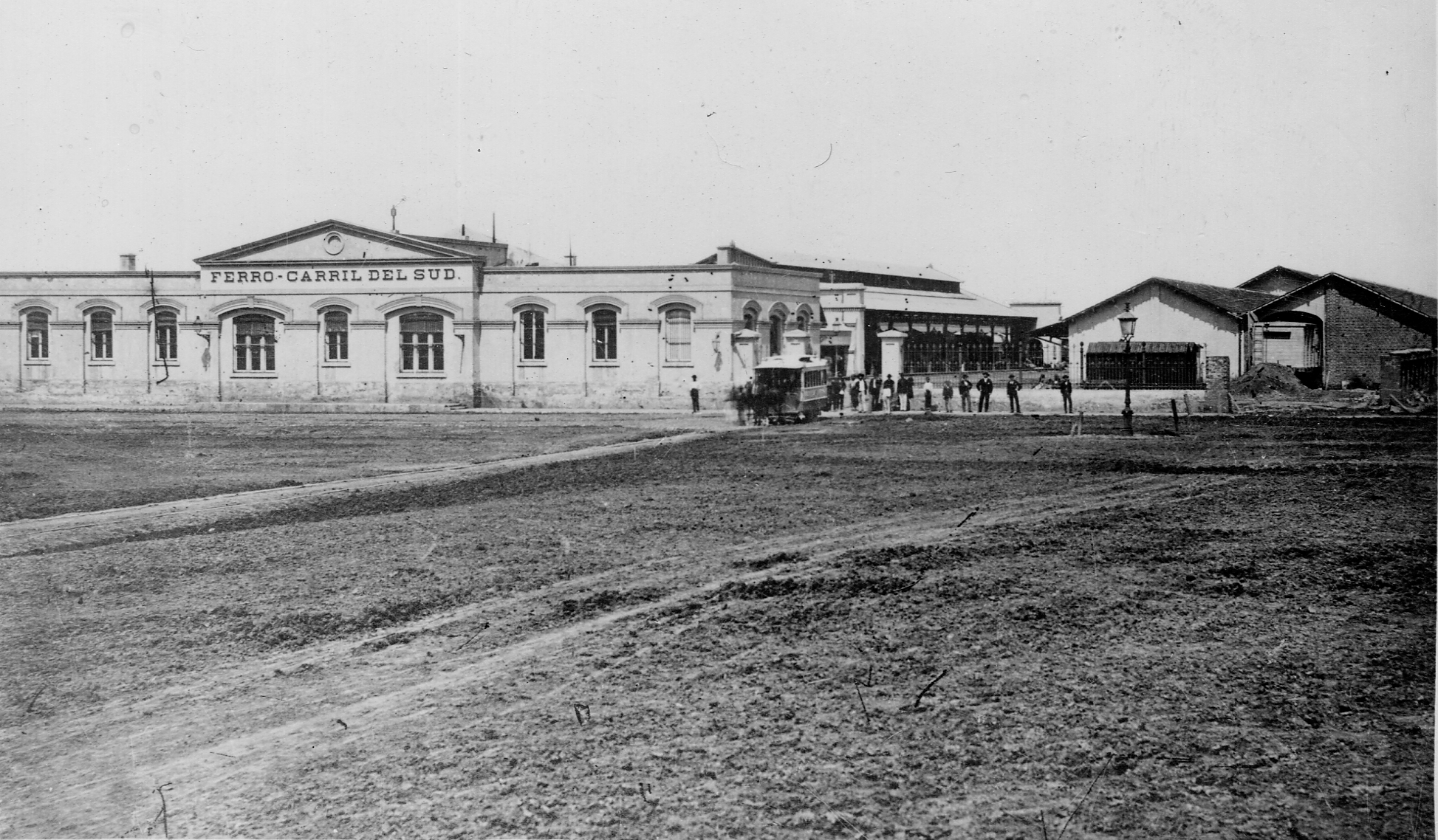
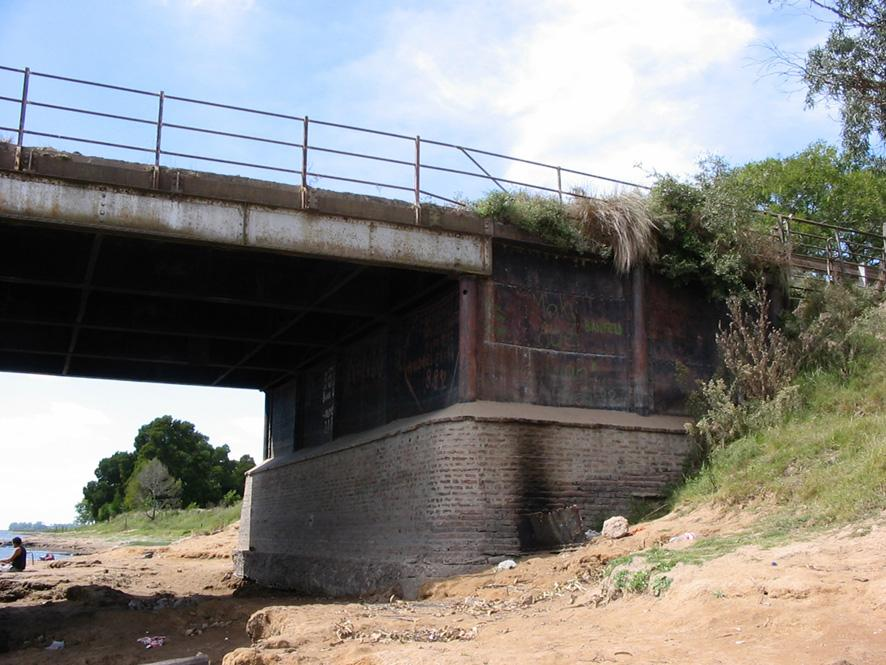
(Left): Constitución railway station (pictured in 1867), a symbol of the expansion of the railway across Buenos Aires Province. The line runs alongside the current route 2;
(right): old "La Postrera" bridge, built in 1871–72. Although not currently in use, it has been preserved due to its historic importance

Bullock carts ("Carretas" in Spanish) travelled by a road extended from Buenos Aires to the Salado River at the end of the 18th century. When rivers and streams were in flood, carts had to stop to continue moving later.

During that period of time, the "pulperías" (gauchos' typical bars in Buenos Aires Province erected next to the roads), were used by travellers to have a drink and rest until the road was passable again. The most used pass to cross the Salado River was "La Postrera", at 5 km from the current Autovía.

Railroad (then Ferrocarril del Sud, which had taken over the construction of the line) reached the city of Chascomús for the first time in 1865, then expanding to Dolores in 1874, Maipú in 1880 until it finally reached Mar del Plata in 1886

The opening of Mar del Plata station ended with the use of charts for the moving of people and merchandise, due to train offered a faster trip which did not depend on weather conditions to be realized.

=== Dirt road ===
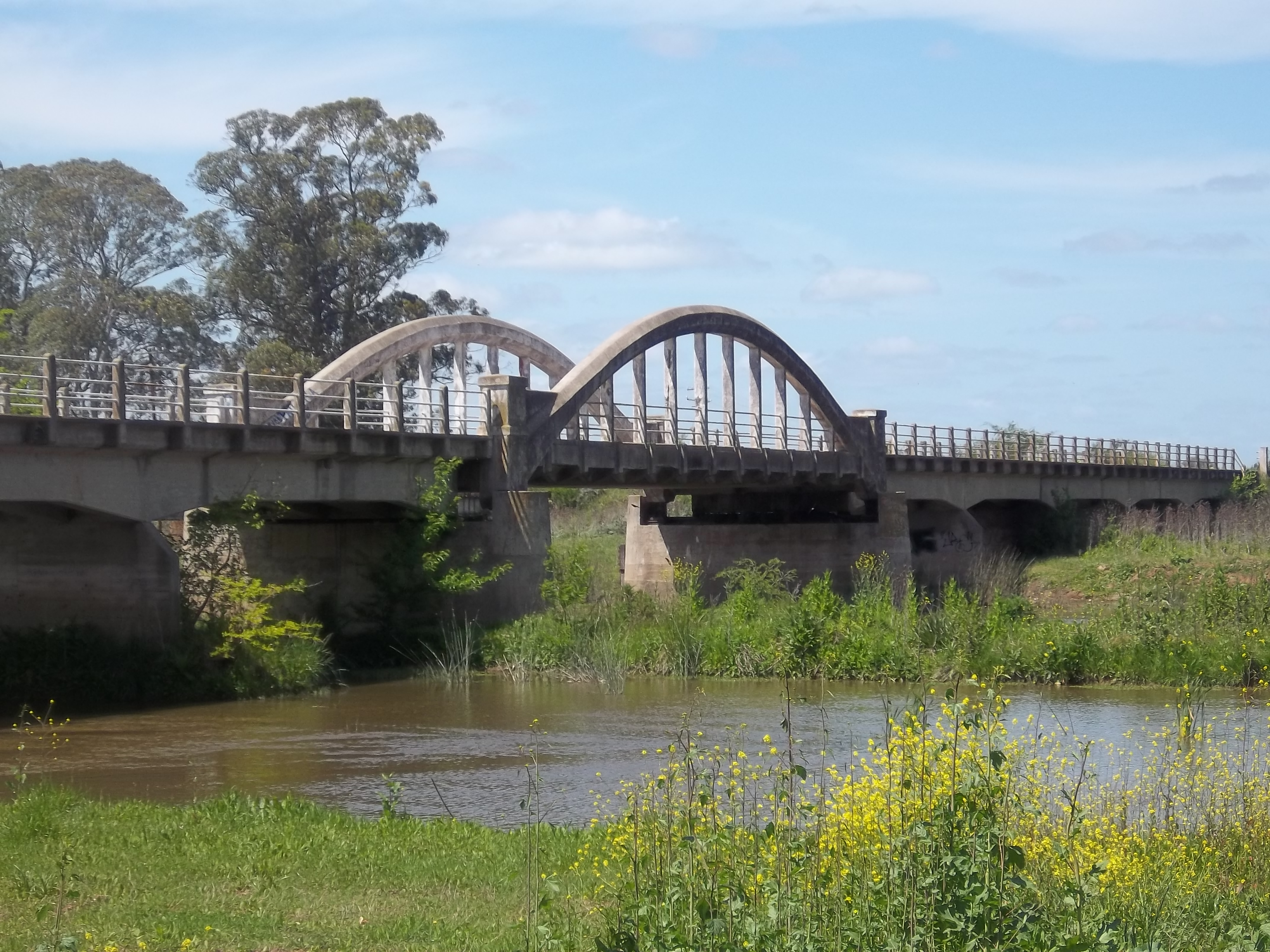
Bridge over 9 Canal, built in 1912 at the North of Dolores on the "old trace" of Route 2

The dirt road from Buenos Aires to Mar del Plata was built by Touring Club Argentino around 1910. This path was different from today, so the road crossed the cities of Avellaneda, Quilmes and Florencio Varela through General Belgrano Road, which was cobbled between 1912 and 1916.

Using this road (which conditions used to get worse when it rained), the vehicles took almost 2 days to reach Mar del Plata from Buenos Aires.

The longest bridges on the road were those that crossed Samborombón and Salado rivers. The bridge over Samborombón was an unstable structure built by Automóvil Club Argentino and the second one was famous bridge "La Postrera", made of iron in 1917 by Engineer Luis Huergo. This bridge was 170m long.

In 2005 the bridge over Salado River was quit and replaced by another made of concrete, which was 275m long.

=== Paved road ===
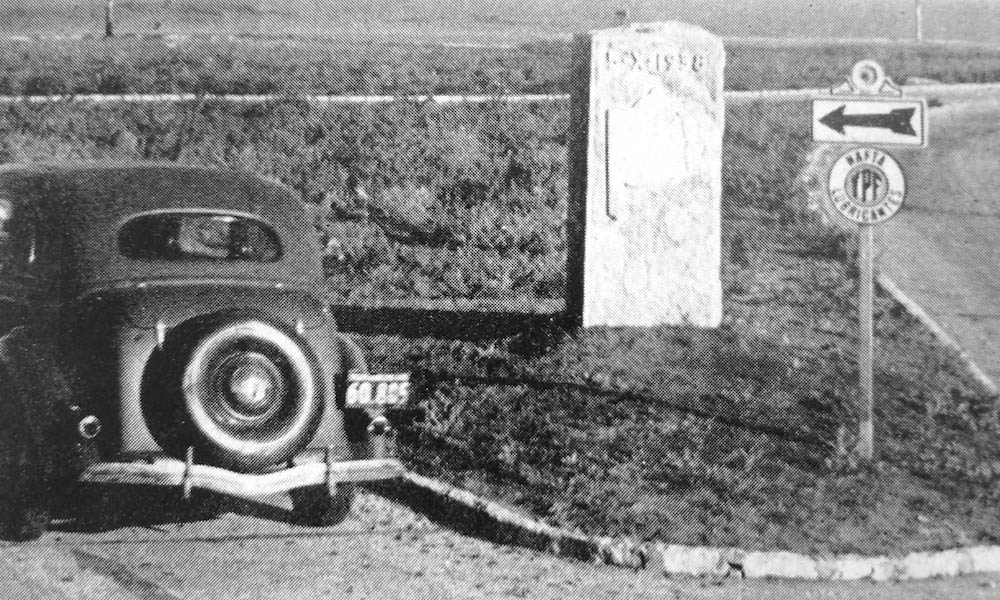
Cornerstone of the route, Constitución Av., Mar del Plata, 1938

The Second Road Congress of Argentina asked President Hipólito Yrigoyen for the construction of a paved road, with the purpose of make transport of mercancies easier, according to Buenos Aires Province economy had always been based on agriculture and stockbreeding. The other important reason to pave the route was to promote tourism, considering that this was Mar del Plata and other cities' main economic activity by then.

Engineers concluded that the road should be built near the Atlantic Ocean coast. The alternative project included a road 20% larger than the original one, apart from this road would not crossed any city. On the other hand, the existing road had seven fuel stations, part of Automóvil Club Argentino services network. This project was finally approved in a meeting celebrated at the city of Dolores on July 2, 1933.

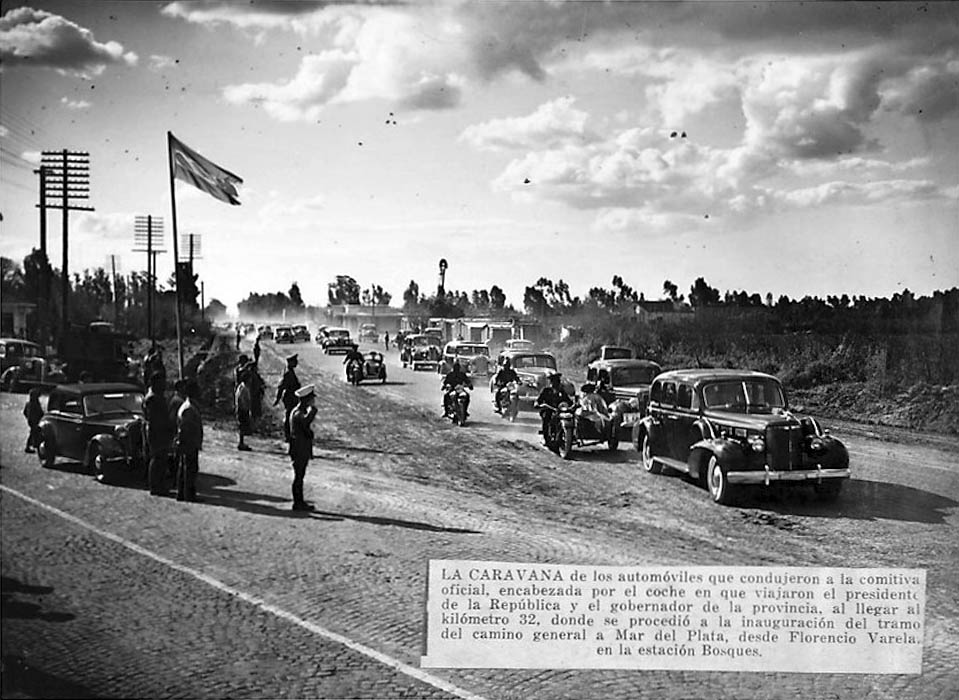
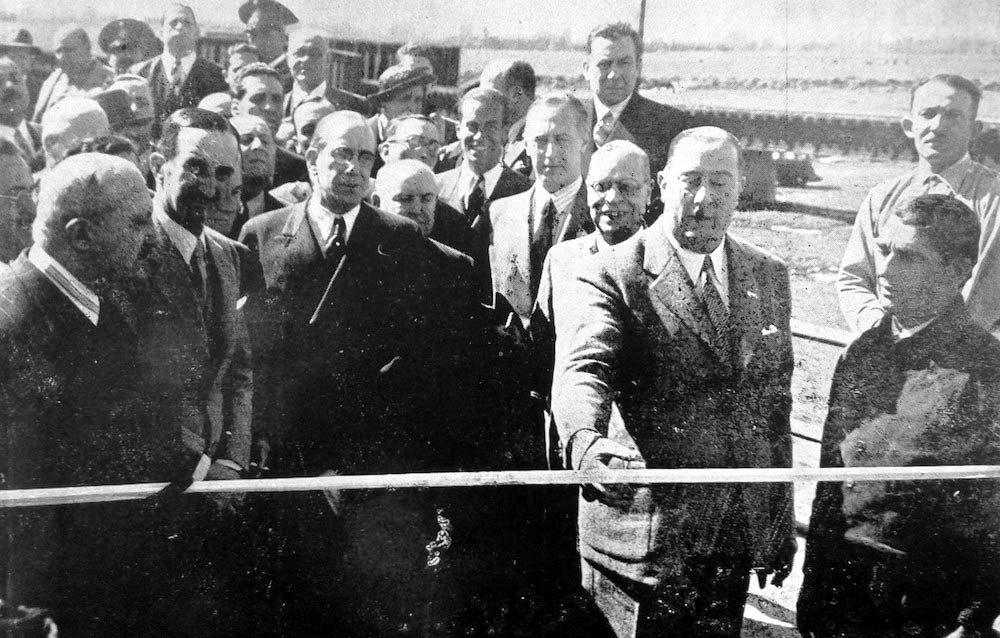
(Left): Presidential car running on the route 2 to Mar del Plata; (right): Governor Manuel Fresco inaugurating the route; both pictures taken on October 5, 1938

In May 1934 the National and Provincial (Buenos Aires) Governments signed an agreement which divided the construction of a paved road into two stages, using the path indicated by Dirección Nacional de Vialidad. The construction began on December 13, 1934, being finished the first part (from Buenos Aires to Dolores) on January 23, 1938. On October 5, the works finished when the road reached Mar del Plata.

The stretch from Dolores to Mar del Plata, which included an access to the recreational area of Parque Camet through Constitución Avenue and another access to downtown through the waterfront and Independencia Avenue, was divided into six sections. All of them were given to different companies which took over the construction of their respective stretches. Finally, on October 5, 1938, the entire paved road was opened, after three years of work between Dolores and Mar del Plata.

The stretch from Buenos Aires to Chascomús was modified in order to the road passes by lands nearer to the city of La Plata. The new road only had three railroad crossings with General Roca Railway tracks: one at the South of Chascomús (km 128), the other at the South of Dolores (km 208,5) and the last inside the urban zone of Mar del Plata (km 403,5). Besides, an iron bridge was built in the Bosques district and an embankment was conceived in order to the railroad tracks passed over the route in Sarandí. This project was repeatedly delayed until it was finally opened by President Juan Domingo Perón in 1953. There was also a level crossing in Berazategui Partido, three else in La Plata Partido, another in General Guido and the last in Vivoratá. All those crossing would be later deactivated as branch-lines were closed in the 1960s and 1970s. The line between General Guido and Pinamar was reactivated in December 1996, although it was suspended in April, 2011. The service was reestablished in January 2021.

The paved road increased the number of tourists that arrived to Mar del Plata and other cities using their cars. By 1940 car vehicles carried more passengers than trains, when five years before only 18% of tourists arrived by cars.

On 5 October 1941 Route 2 became a National road, from which Route 2 started in Nicolás Avellaneda Bridge over the Riachuelo River (opened a year before), following its path through Sargento Ponce and Debenedetti Avenues in Wilde, Buenos Aires, and then connecting with Presidente Mitre Avenue to the South East direction.

=== Reconstruction ===
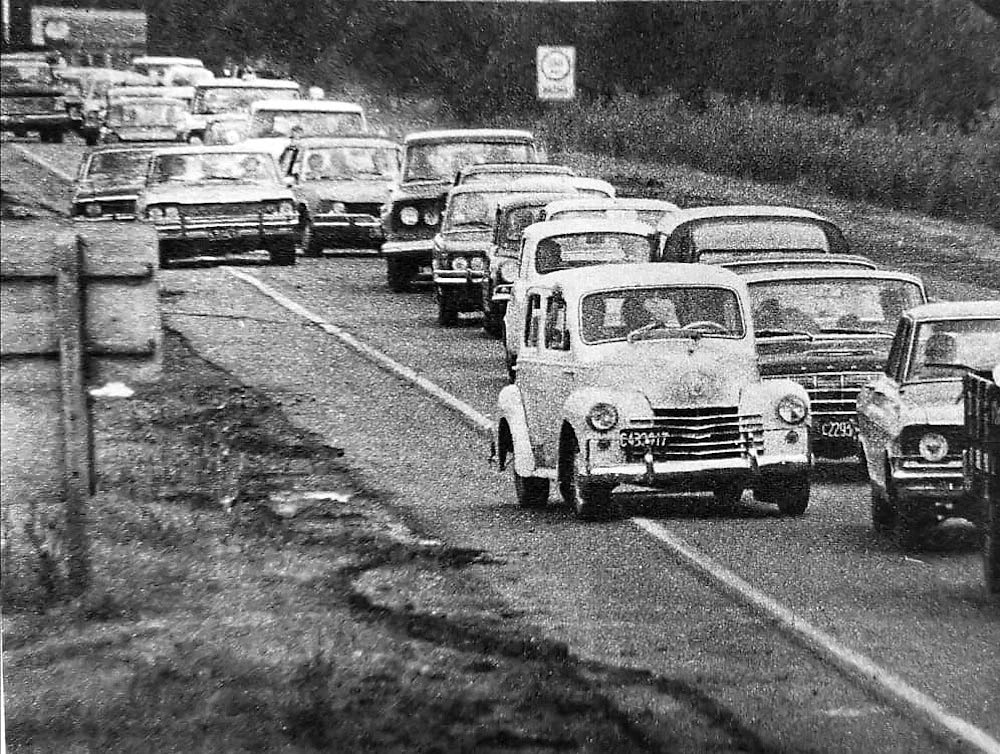
Traffic jam in Route 2 in January 1975. As vehicular movement increased, the road became overloaded during Summer time

By the 1950s the route was in bad conditions due to two main reasons: according to the law which regulated the traffic of vehicles in Argentina, the speed limit was 80 km/h for cars and 50 km/h for trucks; 20 years later, trucks passed at 80 km/h and the road was not prepared for this increase of speed because materials used for its construction were not resistant enough. Another cause that contributed to deterioration of route 2 was that the number of vehicles using the road had tripled within 20 years.

For those reasons, the government invited tenders for the restoration of the road, which took two years of work, from 1956 to 1959. The route was widened to 7.3 metres (24 ft). In 1968 verges were also paved to improve the security on the road.

In 1978 verges were widened to their current size, 2.50 metres (8 ft 2 in). By that time, three bridges were built in the most dangerous crossings of the route: a bridge over General Roca's tracks to Mar del Plata, a bridge over the intersection with National Route 1 (mostly known as "Cruce Varela") at the beginning of the 1970s. The last bridge was erected in the intersection with PR 215, known as "Cruce Etcheverry", opened in December 1979.

As traffic was increasing through the years, Route 2 capacity was overloaded, with plenty of vehicles and accidents. For that reason, the national and provincial governments together planned to build a highway between Buenos Aires and La Plata, which included an access to Route 2 in Rotonda Gutiérrez.

=== Transfer to Provincial domain ===
Through Decree #1595 (1979), the National Government transferred the stretch between Acceso Sudeste and the intersection with PR 36 to Buenos Aires Province.

The construction of Buenos Aires-La Plata highway was delayed until in November 1995 it was finally opened.

=== Concession ===
In 1990 the National Government concessed the most passed routes of Argentina to different companies, which would take over the maintenance of the roads. In return, concessionaries charged toll rates, whose amount would be specified on the contract.

Therefore, in November 1990, Concesionaria Vial del Sur (COVISUR) took over Route 2 for a period of 12 years. Toll booths were erected in Samborombón (km 90) and Maipú (km 273).

In November 2016, Governor of Buenos Aires Province, María Eugenia Vidal, signed the decree stating the province took over the Autovía 2, replacing concessionary AuMar.

=== From route to dual carriageway ===
The route had only one lane by direction, which caused many accidents per year, most of them during Summertime in Argentina. Only in 1992 there were 44 crashes.

In December 1992 the Public Service Ministry of Buenos Aires Province and Covisur signed an agreement with the purpose to build a dual carriageway, establishing a period of work of 3 years for the path Buenos Aires-Dolores and 3 years else from Dolores to Mar del Plata. The agreement stated that Buenos Aires Province would cost the construction and extended the term of concession until June 2012. The works began in January 1993, with a cost of $ 250 million.

On March 5, 1999, the works were finished. The new highway was named "Juan Manuel Fangio", promulgated by Law 12.994.

== Major intersections ==
Partido	City	km	mi	Exit	Destinations	Notes
Berazategui	El Pato	40	24.8	1	to (east)	R36 to Punta Indio (east)
La Plata	Etcheverry	55	34.17	2	to (east)	R13 to Ensenada (east)
La Plata	Etcheverry	59	36.66	2	to (west) – (east)	R215 from San Miguel del Monte (east) to La Plata (west)
Brandsen	Samborombón	90	55.92	–	Tollbooth	
Chascomús	Gándara	103	64	1	(unnamed road) to Gándara station (west)	
Chascomús	Chascomús (city)	114	70.83	1	J.M. de Rosas to Chascomús (west)	
Chascomús	Chascomús (city)	116	72.07	2	to (west) – (east)	RP20 from Ranchos (west) to Magdalena (east)
Chascomús	Chascomús (city)	121	75.18	2	Av. Lastra to Chascomús (west)	
Lezama	Lezama	156	96.93	1	to (west)	R57 to Pila (west)
Castelli	Castelli (city)	179	111	1	to Av. Costanera Alte. Brown (north)	R41 to Baradero (north)
Dolores	Dolores (city)	206	128	1	to (east)	R63 to Paraje Crotto (east)
Dolores	Dolores (city)	209	129.86	1	Alberdi street to Dolores city (east)	
Dolores	Dolores (city)	226	140	1	to (west)	R60 from Parravicini (east) to Azul (east)
General Guido	Gral. Guido (city)	251	155.96	1	to Av. Ricardo Güiraldes (east)	R62 to Gral. Madariaga (east)
General Guido	Gral. Guido (city)	251	155.96	–	FCR's Gral. Guido to Div. de Pinamar	Level crossing (inactive) (Note: The Gral. Guido–Divisadero de Pinamar branch was closed in March 2025.)
Maipú	Maipú (city)	273	169.63	–	Tollbooth	
Maipú	Las Armas	299	185.79	2	to (west) – (east)	R74 from Pinamar (east) to Benito Juárez (east)
Mar Chiquita	Coronel Vidal	343	213.13	1	to (west)	R55 to Pieres (Lobería Partido) (west)
General Pueyrredón	El Casal	386	239.84	1	(unnamed road) to Santa Clara del Mar (east)	
General Pueyrredón	Camet	398	247.30	1	Access to International Airport (east)	
General Pueyrredón	Mar del Plata	400	248.54	1	Av. Constitución Ave. to Av. A. Schweitzer (west) – (east)	
General Pueyrredón	Mar del Plata	403.5	250.72	1	FCR's Constitución – Mar del Plata line	Level crossing (active)
General Pueyrredón	Mar del Plata	403.7	250.84	2	to (west) – (east)	R226 from General Villegas (west) to Mar del Plata city centre (east); in R2, it becomes Av. Pedro Luro
1.000 mi = 1.609 km; 1.000 km = 0.621 mi

== Traffic ==
According to Argentine Law 24.449 being in force at Buenos Aires Province since 2008, the maximum speed limit for cars and motorcycles in Autovía 2 is 120 km/h, with the exception of urban zones where the limit reduces to 60 km/h. For buses, the speed limit has been established at 90 km/h and trucks must go at 80 km/h.

The contract of concession specifies that current dual carriageway could become a highway, as well as a reconstruction of the curves to raise the speed limit to 120 km/h in those sectors.
