= Provincial Route 63 (Buenos Aires) =

Road in Buenos Aires Province, Argentina

Provincial Route 63
- Ruta provincial 63
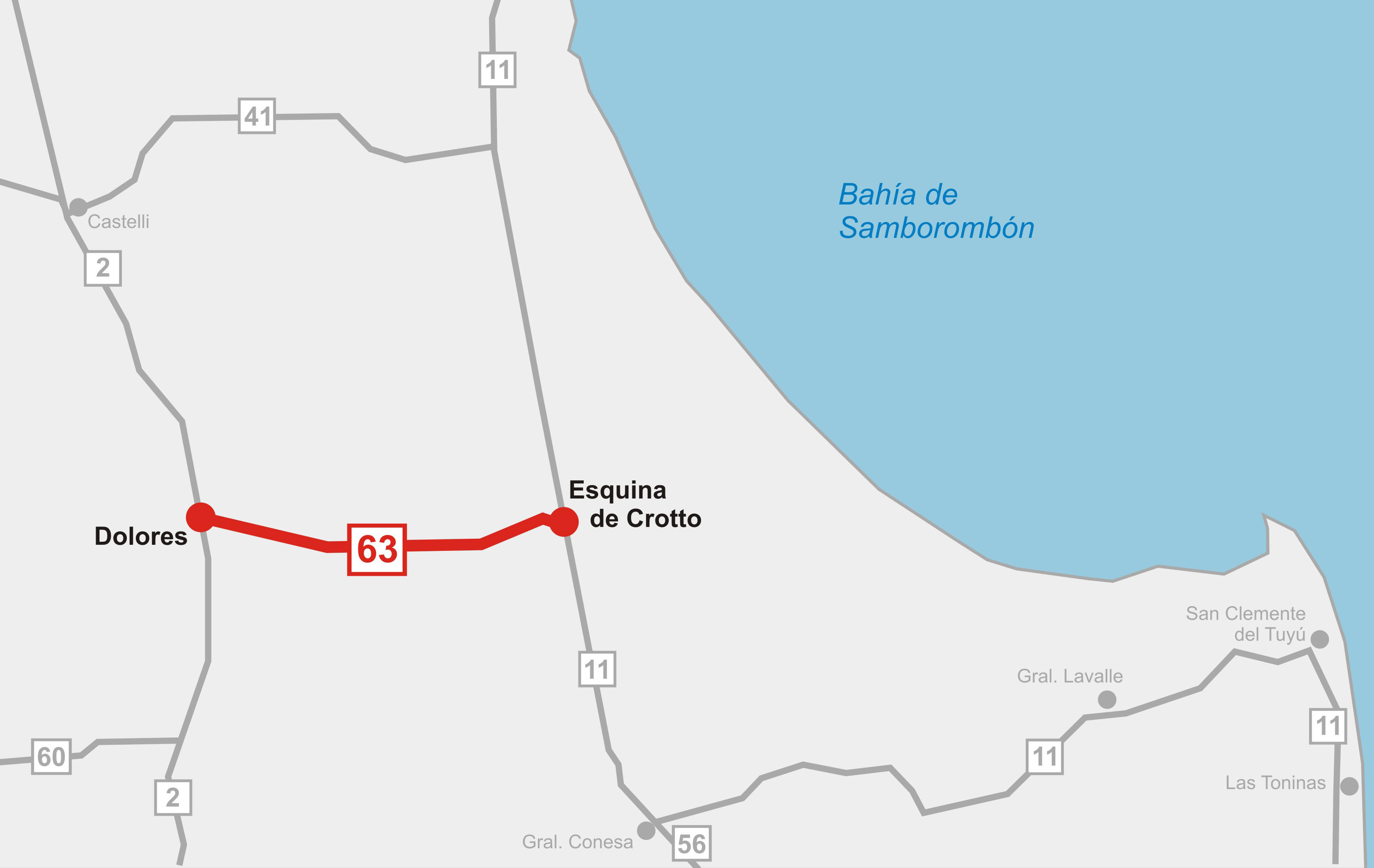

Route information
- Length: 29 km (18 mi)

Major junctions
- West end: in Dolores
- East end: in Esquina de Crotto

Location
- Country: Argentina
- Municipalities: Dolores; Tordillo
- Major cities: Dolores

Highway system
- Highways in Argentina

Provincial Route 63 is a 29-kilometre-long (18 mi) Argentine road in the East of Buenos Aires Province. The road extends from Dolores, Buenos Aires to the "Esquina de Crotto", a paraje in Tordillo Partido.

This route is the shortest road between the city of Buenos Aires and the coast cities of Pinamar and Villa Gesell among other cities in the Atlantic coast. Because of that, the route has an intense traffic during the Summer time in Argentina. The road was paved in 1964.

A paved section (54 km length) of PR 51 near Saladillo was also named "PR 63", but it was changed to PR 91 in mid-2000s.

== Overview ==
This route, along with other provincial and national roads, was given in concession by the Carlos Menem administration in the early 1990s. The Route 63 contract was signed on September 19, 1990, granting concession to "Caminos del Atlántico" (PR 2 was also given to that company) for 15 years with an option to entend the contract for 5 years. No tollbooths were placed along this road.

Due to the increasing number of fatal collisions on the Route 63 during Summer and Easter, in July 2004 the Government of Buenos Aires Province (led by Felipe Solá) promulgated Decree 1,595 to convert both roads, PR 63 and PR 74, into dual carriageways. The project included the entire Route 63 and the Gral. Madariaga–Pinamar section of PR 74. The cost was estimated in AR$67 million. By those times, 20,000 vehicles a day ran on route 63 during Summer. Works were inaugurated in 2006.

On March 9, 2008, in the events known as "the Dolores tragedy", a double-decker bus returning from Mar de Ajó to San Miguel, Buenos Aires, was crashed by a train operated by state-owned Ferrobaires that went to Mar del Plata. The accident was in the RP 63's level crossing, just in front to the main entrance to the city of Dolores. As a result, 17 people died and more than 30 were severely injured. The crossing had its signals (lights, bells, and gates) running normally at the moment of the collision, but those warnings were ignored by the bus driver, who crossed anyway.

In July 2011 the Government of Buenos Aires trespassed the management of the Route 11 to "Autovía del Mar" for a term of 30 years. The company also manages Provincial routes Autovía 2, 63, 56, 74 and 36. In 2016, the Governor of Buenos Aires, María Eugenia Vidal revoked concessions so route 11 become state-owned again.

In October 2021, it was announced that concessionary AUBASA and Trenes Argentinos signed an agreement to build a bridge over the General Roca Railway tracks (the line that connects Constitución and Mar del Plata stations). This will eliminate the level crossing currently existing on the route 63, also improving the safety of the carriageway.

== Major intersections ==
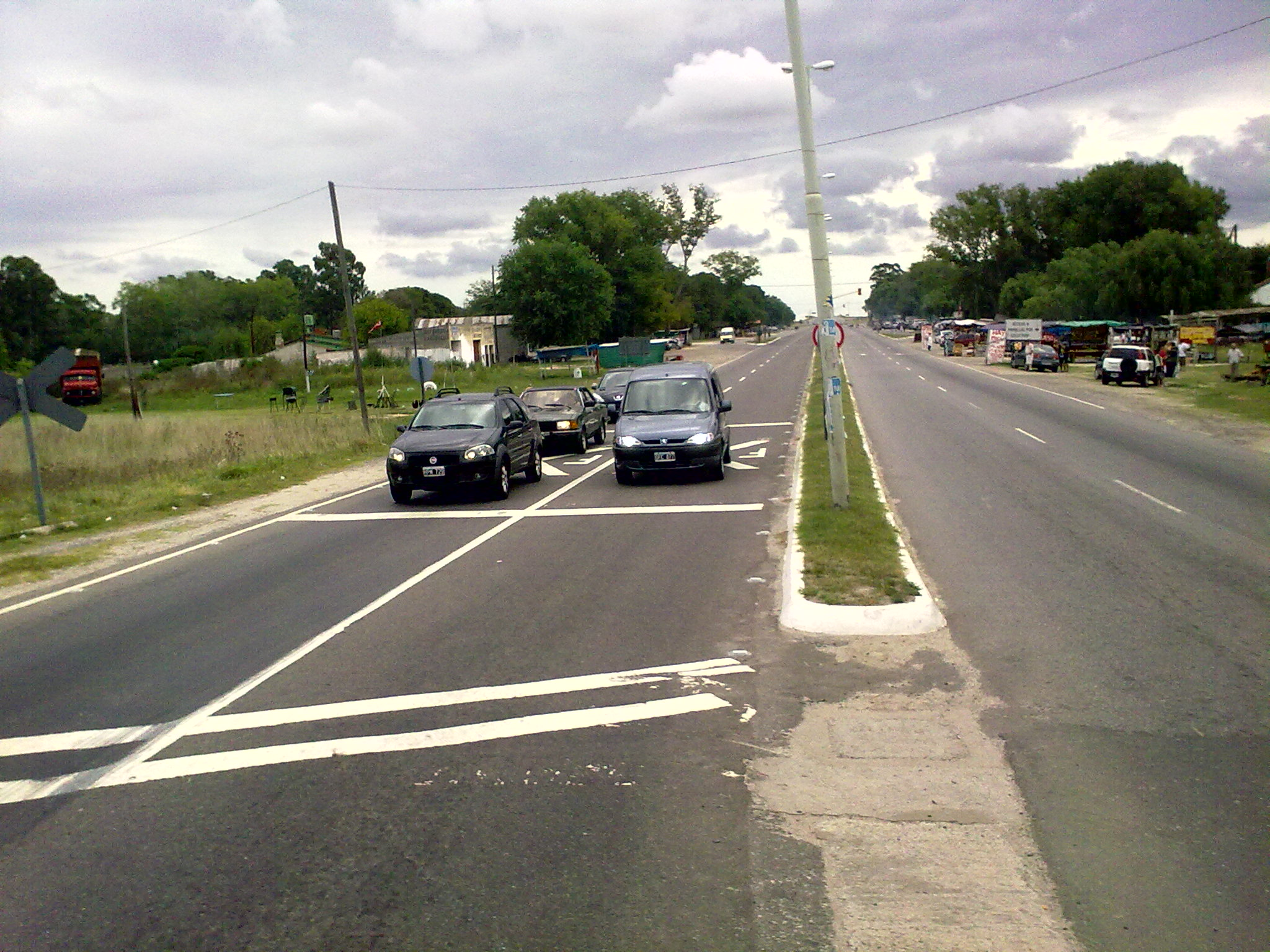
Route 63 at the level crossing with General Roca railway (view from east)

Partido	City	Km	mi	Exit	Destinations	Notes
Dolores	Dolores	0	0	2	to F. Varela (north) – Mar del Plata (south)	
Dolores	Dolores	1.0	0.6	–	FCR's Constitución – Mar del Plata line	Level crossing (active)
Dolores	Dolores	1.2	0.7	1	Av. Buenos Aires to Dolores	West access
Dolores	Dolores	5.0	3.1	1	Calle Belgrano to Dolores	East access
Tordillo	Paraje Crotto	29	18	2	to Punta Lara (north) – Mar del Sur (south)	
