= Diario Hoy (Argentina) =

Argentine newspaper

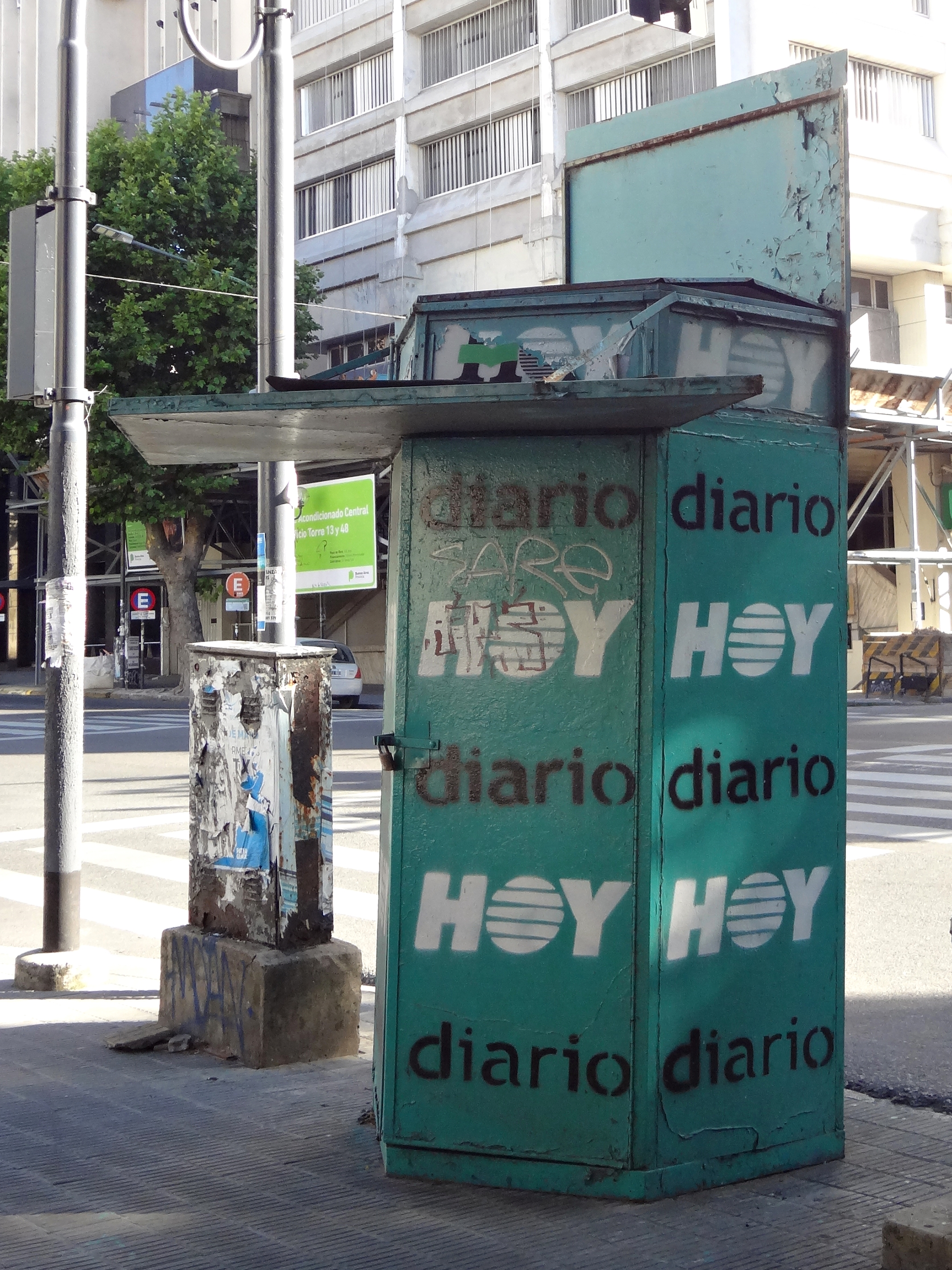
- Type: Daily
- Format: Tabloid
- Editor: Myriam Renée Chávez de Balcedo
- Founded: 10 December 1993
- Ceased publication: 2 November 2018
- Language: Spanish
- Headquarters: Av. 32 nº 426, La Plata, Buenos Aires, Argentina
- Circulation: 60,000 daily copies
- Website: https://web.archive.org/web/20061105163355/http://www.diariohoy.net/

Diario Hoy en la Noticia (in English, "the newspaper of today's news") was an Argentine newspaper that was published in the city of La Plata, in Buenos Aires Province. It was founded on 10 December 1993, by the family of the Secretary General of the Union of Workers and Minors of Education and Minority (SOEME), and union leader of the General Confederation of Labor, Antonio Balcedo, The paper closed down in 2012. Balcedo's wife, Myriam Renee Chavez de Balcedo, known as Nené, was its last director.

The paper's offices were located at 426 32nd Street; its printing plant was located on 508th Street at the corner of 24th Street in the Manuel B. Gonnet neighborhood.

== Distribution ==
On June 1, 2010, Diario Hoy expanded its distribution area and began distribution free of charge in: Berazategui, Quilmes, Brandsen, Magdalena, Ranchos, Bavio, Chascomús, Lezama, General Conesa, Maipú, San Miguel del Monte, Las Flores, General Guido, Dolores, Castelli, General Belgrano, General Lavalle, and Mar de Ajó.

In 2018, the newspaper ended free distribution and cost 15 pesos. Its circulation reached 60,000 copies per day.

== Closure ==
On January 4, 2018, Marcelo Balcedo, who held the position of morning director, was arrested in Uruguay with his wife Paola Fiege, accused of the crimes of money laundering, smuggling and international trafficking of firearms, ammunition, explosives and other related materials, "all in real repetition regime". In response, Myriam Renée Chávez de Balcedo stepped back in as director and laid off more than a hundred employees, including journalists, photographers, cameramen, and editors.

At this stage the paper reduced its circulation, ended free distribution and began to charge (10 to 15 pesos), and some weekends did not distribute a print edition, among other adjustments made by its director.

On the morning of October 18, 2018, Myriam Renée Chávez de Balcedo was arrested by order of federal judge Ernesto Kreplak, accused of illicit association, money laundering, and defrauding for 64 million pesos in the SOEME, the guild led by his son, Marcelo Balcedo, in prison since January 2018. Later, Court No. 3 of La Plata granted him house arrest and ordered an embargo for 400 million pesos. Given this situation, the editor of the newspaper published a final cover and editorial on November 2, 2018, with the title: "Judge Kreplak: Do not be a donkey, ideas are not killed."

Since November 3, 2018, print distribution has ceased. The website went down on November 4, 2018, and remains offline.

== Paper Carriers ==
The paper carriers who distributed the paper were dismissed from their jobs via a WhatsApp message:

"Good morning, I hereby inform you that on Saturday, November 3, the newspaper closed its doors. Unfortunately and with great pain I have to tell you that the judicial pressure that was exerted viciously against this newspaper makes this happen!!!! Any other news I will communicate! Of course, I appreciate the stamina that many of you have put in over the years, and especially this last year when everything was complicated!!! Thanks and regards."

== Motto ==
The newspaper had the mottos: "Reflect the reality as it is", "The right to inform and be informed" and "The newspaper that broke with the information monopoly", alluding to its status as an alternative to the traditional newspaper Platense El Día, which until 1993 was the only newspaper in the city of La Plata.
