= List of highways numbered 63 =

The following highways are numbered 63. For a list of roads called N63, see List of N63 roads.

== Argentina ==
- Buenos Aires Provincial Route 63

== Australia ==
- Gregory Developmental Road – Queensland State Route 63

== Canada ==
- Alberta Highway 63
- Newfoundland and Labrador Route 63
- Ontario Highway 63

== Greece ==
- EO63 road

== India ==
- National Highway 63 (India)

== Iran ==
- Road 63

== Korea, South ==
- National Route 63

== Malaysia ==
- FT 63 Malaysia Federal Route 63

== New Zealand ==
- New Zealand State Highway 63

== Philippines ==
- N63 highway (Philippines)

== United Kingdom ==
- A63 road (Leeds-Kingston upon Hull)

== United States ==
- Interstate 63 (former proposal)
- U.S. Route 63
- Alabama State Route 63
  - County Route 63 (Lee County, Alabama)
- Arizona State Route 63 (former)
- California State Route 63
- Colorado State Highway 63
- Connecticut Route 63
- Florida State Road 63
- Georgia State Route 63
  - Georgia State Route 63 (1921–1967) (former)
- Hawaii Route 63
- Illinois Route 63 (former)
- Indiana State Road 63
- K-63 (Kansas highway)
- Kentucky Route 63
- Louisiana Highway 63
  - Louisiana State Route 63 (former)
- Maryland Route 63
- Massachusetts Route 63
- M-63 (Michigan highway)
- Minnesota:
  - Minnesota State Highway 63 (1920) (former)
  - Minnesota State Highway 63 (1934) (former)
  - County Road 63 (Dakota County, Minnesota)
- Mississippi Highway 63
- Missouri Route 63 (1922) (former)
- Nebraska Highway 63
- Nevada State Route 63 (former)
- New Hampshire Route 63
- New Jersey Route 63
  - County Route 63 (Bergen County, New Jersey)
- New Mexico State Road 63
- New York State Route 63
  - County Route 63B (Cayuga County, New York)
  - County Route 63 (Chemung County, New York)
  - County Route 63 (Dutchess County, New York)
  - County Route 63 (Livingston County, New York)
  - County Route 63 (Nassau County, New York)
  - County Route 63 (Onondaga County, New York)
  - County Route 63 (Orleans County, New York)
  - County Route 63 (Putnam County, New York)
  - County Route 63 (Rensselaer County, New York)
  - County Route 63 (Suffolk County, New York)
  - County Route 63 (Warren County, New York)
  - County Route 63 (Westchester County, New York)
- North Carolina Highway 63
- North Dakota Highway 63 (former)
- Ohio State Route 63
- Oklahoma State Highway 63
- Pennsylvania Route 63
- South Carolina Highway 63
- South Dakota Highway 63
- Tennessee State Route 63
- Texas State Highway 63
  - Texas State Highway Spur 63
  - Farm to Market Road 63 (former)
  - Texas Park Road 63
- Utah State Route 63
- Vermont Route 63
- Virginia State Route 63
- West Virginia Route 63
- Wisconsin Highway 63 (former)

Territories

- Puerto Rico Highway 63
- U.S. Virgin Islands Highway 63

== See also ==
- List of highways numbered 63A
- A63 (disambiguation)

Preceded by 62	Lists of highways 63	Succeeded by 64
