= Maipú =

Maipú may refer to the following places:

== Argentina ==
- Maipú Partido, an administrative division of Buenos Aires Province
  - Maipú, Buenos Aires, capital of Maipú Partido
- Maipú Department, Chaco
- Maipú Department, Mendoza
  - Maipú, Mendoza
    - Deportivo Maipú, an association football club

== Chile ==
- Maipú, Chile
  - Battle of Maipú

== See also ==
- Maipo (disambiguation)
