= Dolores Partido =

Dolores Partido de Dolores
- Department

- location of Dolores Partido in Buenos Aires Province
- Coordinates: 36°19′S 57°40′W
- Country: Argentina
- Established: 17 August 1817; 209 years ago
- Founder: Ramón Lara
- Seat: Dolores

Government
  - Intendant: Juan Pablo García (Homeland Force)

Area
  - Total: 1,980 km^{2} (760 sq mi)

Population
  - Total: 25,980
  - Density: 13.1/km^{2} (34.0/sq mi)
- Demonym: dolorense
- Postal Code: B7100
- IFAM: BUE034
- Area Code: 02245
- Patron saint: Nuestra Señora de Dolores
- Website: dolores.gob.ar

Dolores Partido is a partido in the eastern part of Buenos Aires Province in Argentina. It borders the partidos of Castelli, Tordillo, Maipú, General Guido and Pila.

The provincial subdivision has a population of about 32,000 inhabitants in an area of 1,980 km^{2} (764 sq mi), and its capital city is Dolores, 210 km (130 mi) from Buenos Aires.

== Settlements ==
- Dolores (pop. 24,120)
- Sevigne (pop. 286)
- Paraje Los Sauquitos
- Paraje Parravicini
- Paraje Sol de Mayo

== History ==
- 1806 at the end of the Spanish colonial times, the countryside of Buenos Aires extended north of the Salado River, protected against the natives by forts. The few populated towns, near its right bank, were starting to encroach the vast territories of the native people, who lived in great numbers near Samborombón Bay. To the south of the Salado, a small fort was built, to provide defense for several ranches in the area.
- 1817, the area of "Pago de Dolores" is formed.
- 1821, the natives razed the town, which is rebuilt.
- 1825, the Monsalvo district is adjoined.
- 1831, a Justice of the Peace court is opened, separating itself from "Partido de Monsalvo".
- 1839 the area of the Partido is reduced by a federal decree that divides the area in thirds: Tordillo, Pila and Dolores.
- 1865, the borders of the Partido are defined.
