= Camet =

Camet is a Southern French surname. Notable people with the surname include:

- Carmelo Camet (1904–2007), Argentine fencer
- Francisco Camet (1876–1931), Argentine fencer
- Raffaella Camet (born 1992), Peruvian volleyball player

== See also ==
- Estacion Camet, is a railway station and village north of Mar del Plata, Buenos Aires province, Argentina
