= General Pirán =

- Town
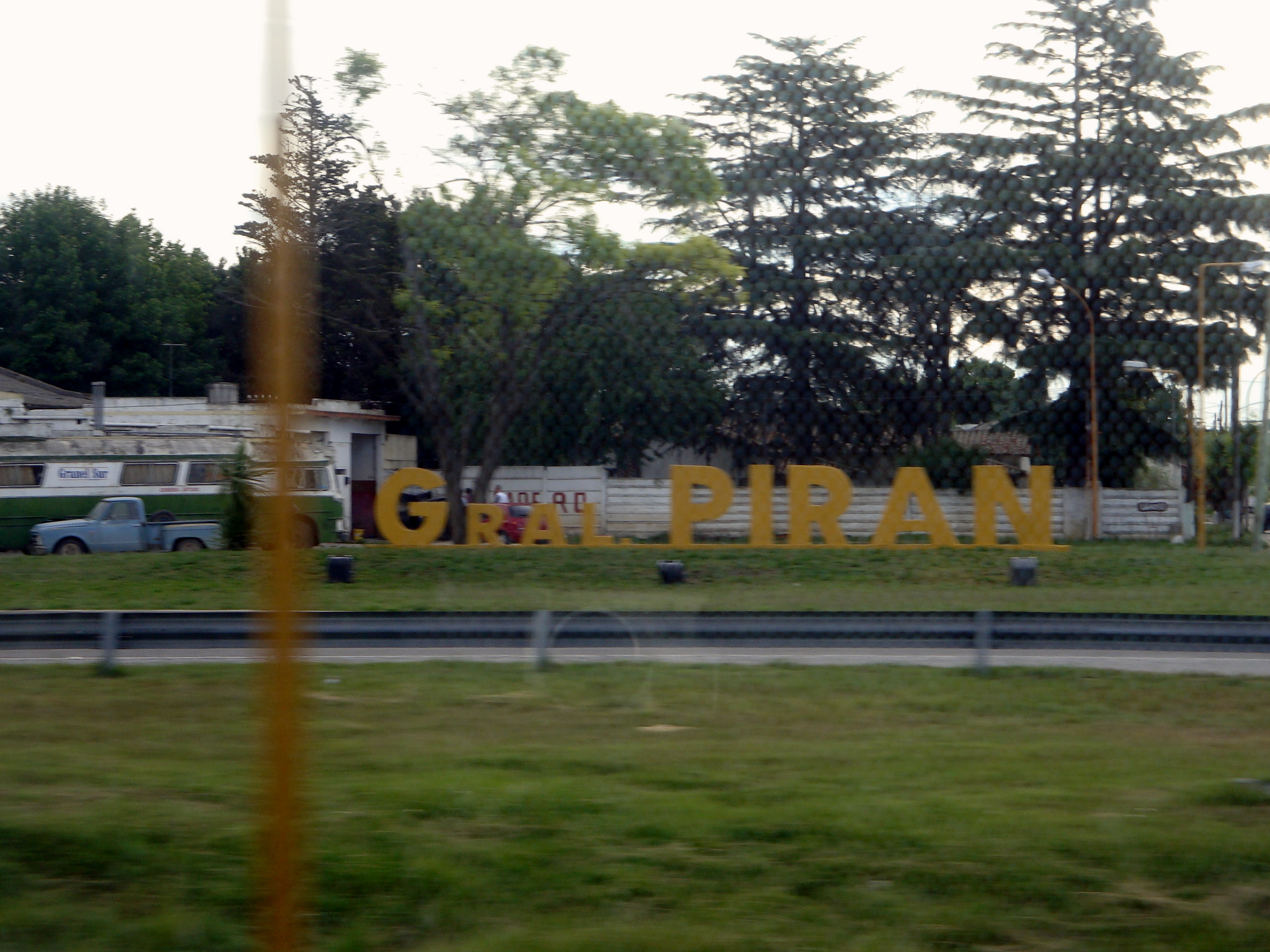
- Entrance sign to the town

- Location within Buenos Aires Province
- Coordinates: 37°16′34″S 57°46′26″W
- Country: Argentina
- Province: Buenos Aires
- Partidos: Mar Chiquita
- Established: February 16, 1890
- Elevation: 15 m (49 ft)

Population (2001 Census)
  - Total: 2,896
- Time zone: UTC−3 (ART)
- CPA Base: B 7172
- Climate: Dfc

General Pirán is a town located in the Mar Chiquita Partido in the province of Buenos Aires, Argentina. The town is located along Provincial Route 2.

== History ==
A railway station was constructed in what would become General Pirán in 1890. The town was founded the same year, on February 16. The town was named after José María Pirán an Argentine politician. A chapel, the Immaculate Conception Church, was constructed in the town in 1907.

== Architecture ==
The town is home to a 3 m (9.8 ft) replica model of the Statue of Liberty. The structure was constructed in 1910 to celebrate the centennial of Argentine independence from Spain.

== Population ==
According to INDEC, which collects population data for the country, the town had a population of 2,896 people as of the 2001 census.
