= Maipo =

Maipo may refer to:

- Maipo, Chile, a town in Buin, Chile
- San José de Maipo, a town in Chile
- Maipo (volcano), a volcano on the border of Argentina and Chile
- Maipo River, the river that rises on the west slope Maipo volcano and flows through the Santiago Metropolitan Region of Chile
- Maipo Province, a province in the Santiago Metropolitan Region of Chile
- Maipo Island
- Maipo Valley
- MS Maipo, an Argentine cruise ship rammed and sunk by USNS General M. L. Hersey (T-AP-148) off the coast of Germany on 14 January 1951
- Maipo, a code-name for version 7 of Red Hat Enterprise Linux

== See also ==
- Mai Po Marshes
- Maipú (disambiguation)
