= Eduardo Wilde =

Argentine physician, politician and writer

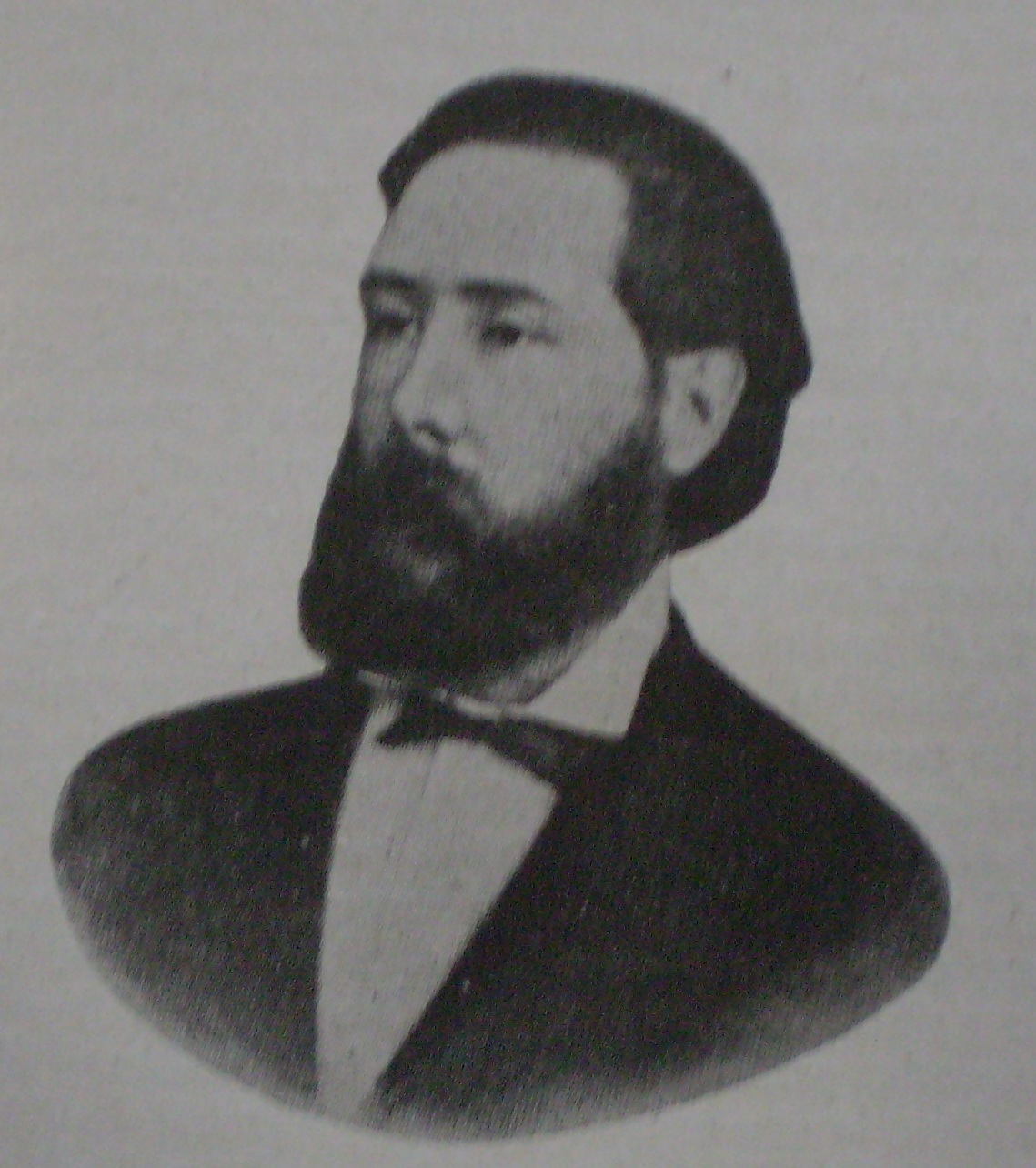
Eduardo Wilde

Eduardo Wilde (June 15, 1844 – September 5, 1913) was an Argentine physician, politician, and writer, and among the most prominent intellectual figures of the modernizing Generation of '80 in Argentina.

== Life and times ==
Eduardo Faustino Wilde was born in Tupiza, Bolivia, in 1844, to a mother from Tucumán (Argentina), and an English Argentine father from Buenos Aires. His father, Col. Diego Wilde a relative of the writer Oscar Wilde, temporarily fled from Argentina to Bolivia during the rule of Governor Juan Manuel de Rosas, and returned to Argentina after the latter's fall in 1852. He was raised in Concepción del Uruguay, and attended the local Colegio Nacional (one of a system of public college preparatory schools), where among his classmates were future Presidents Julio Roca and Victorino de la Plaza.

Wilde enrolled in the University of Buenos Aires School of Medicine in 1864, and as a student, he treated cholera patients during an 1867 outbreak; his own father died from the disease while a commander of Argentine troops in the brutal Paraguayan War in 1866. Following an internship at the General Women's Hospital, he graduated with a Medical Degree in 1870, and despite his early epidemiological experience, wrote his thesis on hiccups. His efforts as an Army doctor in the Paraguayan front, and during the historic, 1871 yellow fever epidemic in Buenos Aires, however, earned him renown, and a professorship at the university in 1873. He first entered into public service with his appointment as the nation's Director of Public Health by President Domingo Sarmiento.

A supporter of Buenos Aires Province advocate Adolfo Alsina's Autonomist Party, he was elected to the provincial legislature in 1874, and was named vice president of the chamber before his election to the Lower House of Congress in 1876. He became a leading liberal during his two terms in Congress, and emerged as the chief counterpoint to conservative congressional powerbroker Aristóbulo del Valle. A man of varied interests, Wilde also wrote for a number of newspapers, and directed La República for four years. His erstwhile classmate, President Julio Roca, appointed him Minister of Justice and Education in 1882. Wilde had record sums invested in the Colegio Nacional system, as well as in normal schools. He enacted Law 1420, the nation's first comprehensive laws mandating secular education, as well as 1565 and 2393, which mandated civil marriages, thereby lessening the influential Catholic Church's control over the two key institutions.

These reforms helped earn him the nomination to the powerful Internal Affairs Minister's post by Roca's hand-picked successor, Miguel Juárez Celman, in 1886. Wilde focused efforts on public health for the rapidly growing population, and commissioned Eduardo Madero, a financier with ties to Barings Bank, to develop a new port (in what later became Puerto Madero). These initiatives complemented his earlier work at the Justice Ministry by advancing the then isolated country's social and economic modernization — a key tenet of the Generation of 1880, as those who shared in the policy became known. The death of an illustrious uncle, Dr. José Antonio Wilde (1813–1887), led to his authorizing the renaming of the settlement, today a suburb of the Argentine capital, in the town doctor's name in 1888.

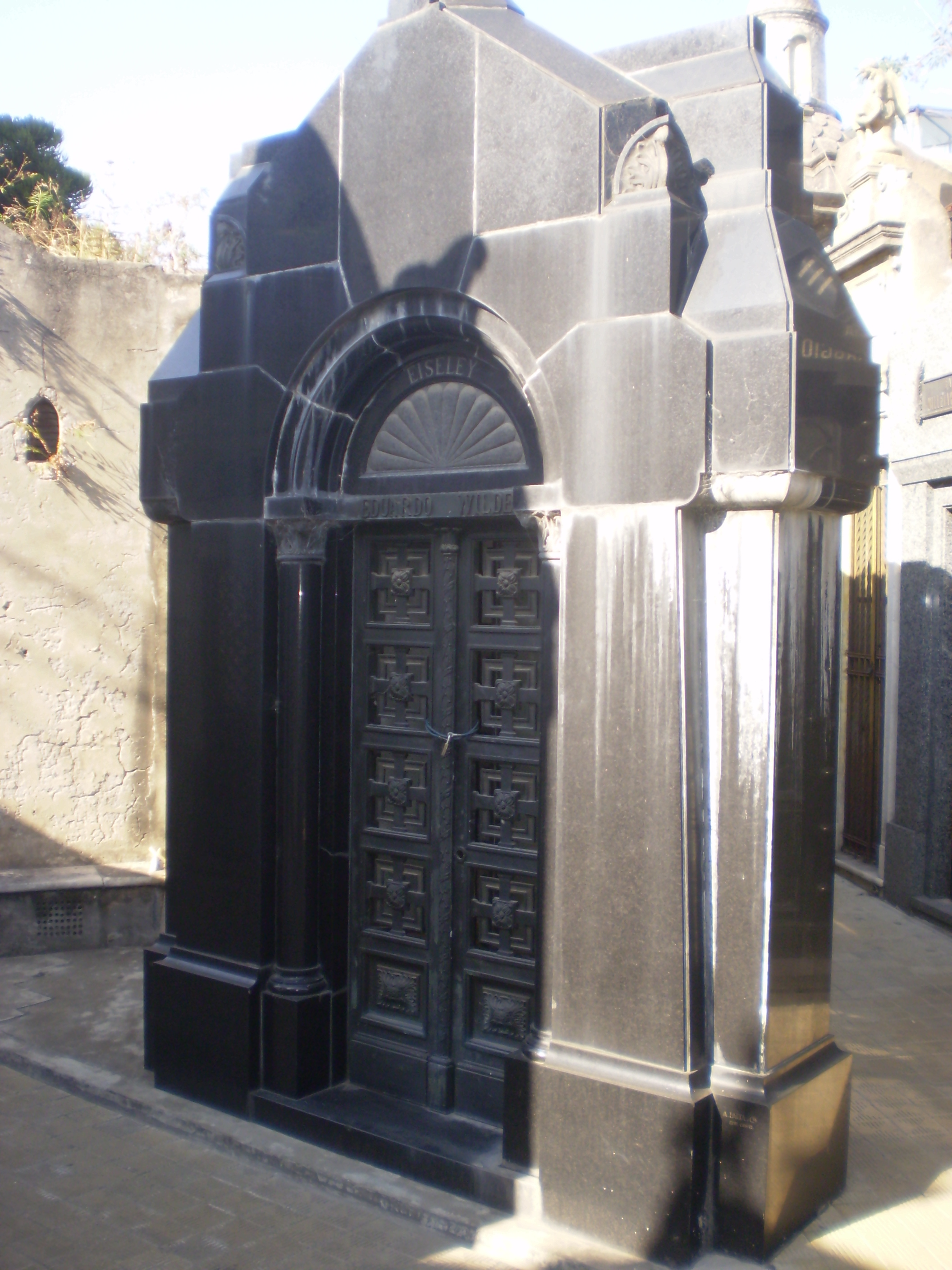
Wilde's Recoleta crypt

The Panic of 1890 and resulting collapse of the state's relationship with Barings led to the Revolution of the Park, after which President Juárez Celman and his cabinet resigned. Wilde became a world traveler during the next eight years, touring the United States, Japan, China, Egypt, and throughout Europe, publishing his voluminous travel diaries in Travels and Observations, and By Land and by Sea. Devoting himself to writing, he drew on his medical background to publish Lessons in Hygiene and Lessons in Legal Medicine and Toxicology, as well as Prometheus and Company, an account of his medical experience. He returned to public service upon Roca's reelection as president in 1898, and was again named Director of Public Health. A coinciding outbreak of the bubonic plague in Asunción, Paraguay, prompted Wilde to organize a humanitarian mission to the affected area, appointing the nation's foremost epidemiologist at the time, Dr. Carlos Malbrán, as its leader.

President Roca appointed Wilde Ambassador to the United States in 1900. He continued to lend his expertise to, among others, the 1901 International Conference of Sanitation in Havana, and the 1902 International Conference on Blindness. Subsequently, he held ambassadorial posts in Mexico, Spain, the Netherlands, and Belgium. There, he represented Argentina in the 1913 Brussels Conference on the Polar regions, but died in Brussels shortly afterwards. He was buried in La Recoleta Cemetery.
