= Wilde, Buenos Aires =

Wilde
- City
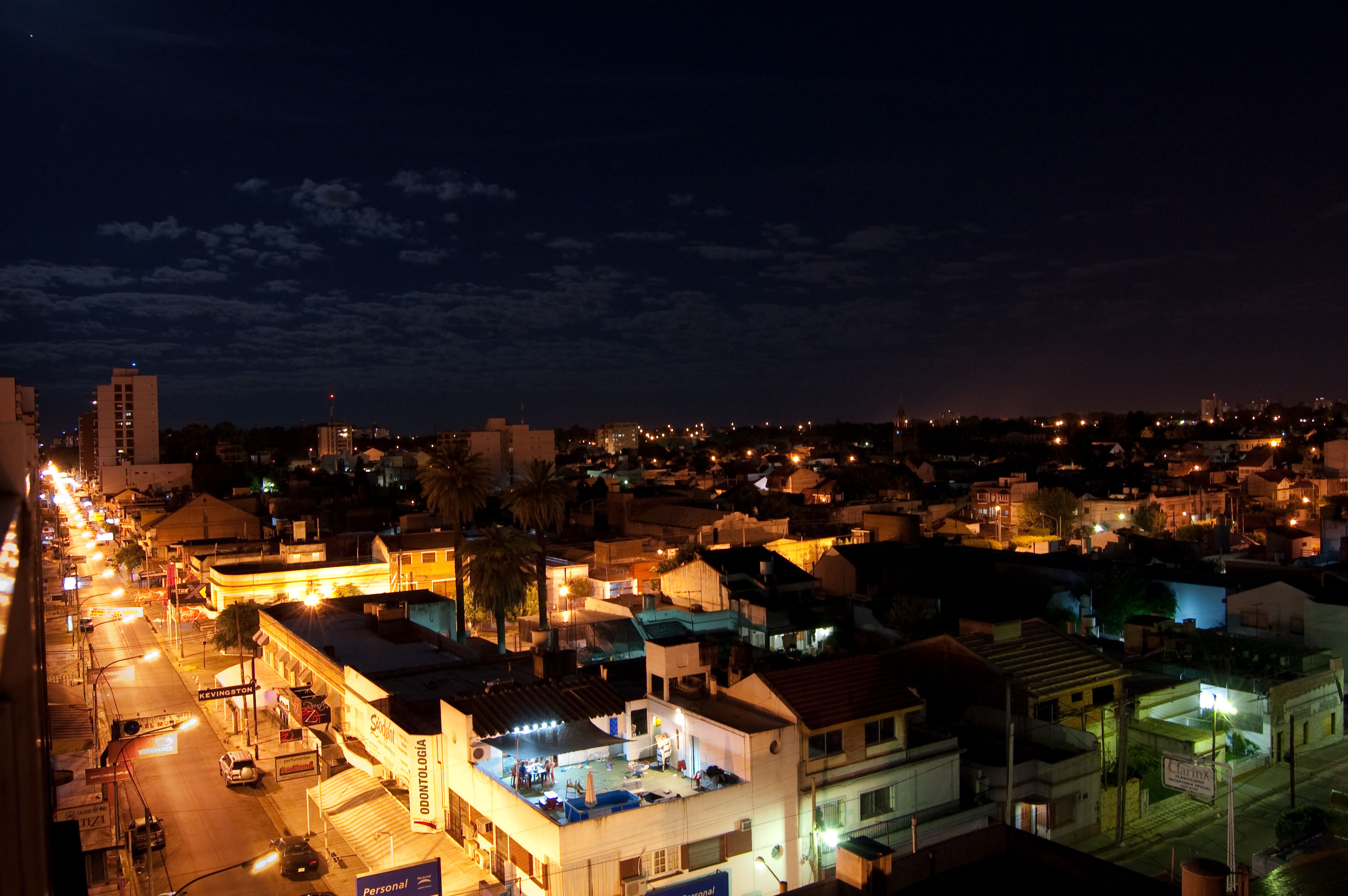

- Location in Greater Buenos Aires
- Coordinates: 34°42′S 58°19′W
- Country: Argentina
- Province: Buenos Aires
- Partido: Avellaneda

Population (2001 census [INDEC])
  - Total: 65,881
- CPA Base: B 1875
- Area code: +54 11

Wilde is a city in the Avellaneda Partido, Buenos Aires Province, Argentina. Wilde is the most populous district in Avellaneda, with a total of 65,881 inhabitants (as of a 2001 census). It is a part of the Greater Buenos Aires urban agglomeration.

The city originated as an estancia founded by Luis Gaitán c. 1600. The settlement was the site of the first salthouse in what is now Argentina. In 1888, Eduardo Wilde named it after his uncle, Doctor José Antonio Wilde (1813–1887). Wilde was a physician who led local efforts to improve public health, including obtaining permits for the construction of the local hospital and sewer system. The 1885 opening of a Buenos Aires Great Southern Railway station at the site led to the establishment of Villa Jurado, the city's first subdivision (1889).

Following a movement of English gardens, the city was developed by local architects as the residential borough of Avellaneda. Large grounds previously utilized by the local "gauchos" for the training of horses and farming land were eventually converted into large parks, and the region became a popular area for weekend cottages. Wilde rapidly developed into a small city, while keeping countryside aesthetics with its residential borough. On the east end of Wilde, there is a large coastal area with a sandy beach linked to the Río de la Plata, from where it is possible to see (on clear days) the coast of Uruguay.

== Education ==
During the 1930s through 1950s, many European immigrants settled in and around Wilde, creating a multilingual society that gave rise to bilingual schools and private colleges in the area. Such institutions including:

- Instituto San Pablo
- Colegio San Ignacio
- Colegio San Diego
- Colegio Modelo Sara Eccleston
- Colegio Modelo John F. Kennedy
- Colegio Mariano Moreno
- Instituto Salvador Soreda
- Colegio San Miguel Arcangel

== Clubs ==
Wilde is home to the training ground of Club Atlético Independiente, and Club El Porvenir, soccer clubs which play in the lower leagues of Argentine football. Wilde is also home to some of the oldest social clubs in the region, the "Sporting Club" and the "Club Juventud" (meaning the youth club).

== Historical Records ==
In 1619, Don Melchor Maciel acquired the lands of Gaitán and created a larger manor with grounds for cattle, also developing a residence by the large shores of the Rio de la Plata. After his death, his widow, Catalina de Melo, passed the land by marriage to Home Pessoa de Sá, who eventually created an even larger property of 24,000 hectares (59,305 acres) all the way to the river Samborombón. This large territory eventually passed on to his son's wife Maria de Arroyo, who decided to divide the land into four large sections to help control and administer funds.

One of these sections was acquired by Don Juan Estanislao Zamudio and his wife Doña María del Carmen La Valle during XVIII. The section containing the house was purchased by a German family and eventually reached the hands of Mercedes von Bismarck, who before her death, donated the land to the church for the creation of a park for the youth that at a time was named "Geodesia" and today is known as "Parque Dominico" for the Dominican Monastery that housed the administration. A neighboring landowner, Federico Gattermeyer, did likewise and in 1908 donated a large trust to the Port Railway for the creation of a station in Villa Domínico that was opened in 1909. The remaining lands were acquired by various families, among them, one of the Pereyra Iraola to develop the land since the north part of the Province of Buenos Aires was not as fertile as the Wildes. The settlement of these new families created a gentrification of the area, establishing mansions and a few large manors near what is today the main street called "calle Las Flores".

== The British and the Wilde Railway Station ==
Argentina's two biggest railways, the Central Argentine Railway and the Buenos Aires Great Southern Railway, were built, owned, and operated by the British. Both had headquarters in London and offices and stations in Wilde and Quilmes.

They were started at the same time, but the Southern was made in sections, while the Central was planned as a great iron road to open almost four hundred miles (640 km) of sparsely populated, rich land.

A decree issued in August 1863 authorized the construction of the Southern, based on a proposal by a group of people that included the already mentioned wealthy Irish merchant Thomas Armstrong and George Drabble, a pioneer in railways and in the frozen-meat trade and one-time president of the Bank of London and River Plate who had arrived in Buenos Aires in 1848, Alfred Lumb, Henry Green, John Fair and Henry Harrat, merchants and landowners who were anxious to invest in a promising enterprise and to increase the value of their property by means of the new communications. The initial authorized capital was about £700,000. Lumb had the concession and the support of shareholders, among whose names were Thomas Duguid, the Fair family, British Consul Frank Parish (later the Southern's chairman who, with Baring, bought into the Central) and David Robertson. They were all the elite of the British community and as such found no difficulty in selling shares to investors in London, Birmingham, Liverpool and Manchester. The company quoted on the London stock exchange.

The Standard of 4 August 1865 announced that, 'The Southern Railway will be open for passenger traffic on Monday, stating that the trains will leave in the morning from Constitución railway station to La Plata with stops in Wilde and Quilmes and return at night - they will go to a station within three leagues of Chascomus', which became the terminal in December of that year. Those were the first eighty miles (130 km). Another 500 (800 km) were added in the next twenty years.

== Scottish National Antarctic Expedition ==
In late 1903, crew members of the Scottish National Antarctic Expedition were hosted at the summer residence of W. G. Davis. Their ship, the Scotia, had run aground on the Rio de la Plata estuary, and was stuck for several days before it floated free and was assisted into the port of Buenos Aires by a tugboat on December 24, 1903.

== Notable residents ==
- Yesica Bopp
