= Labardén =

- Town
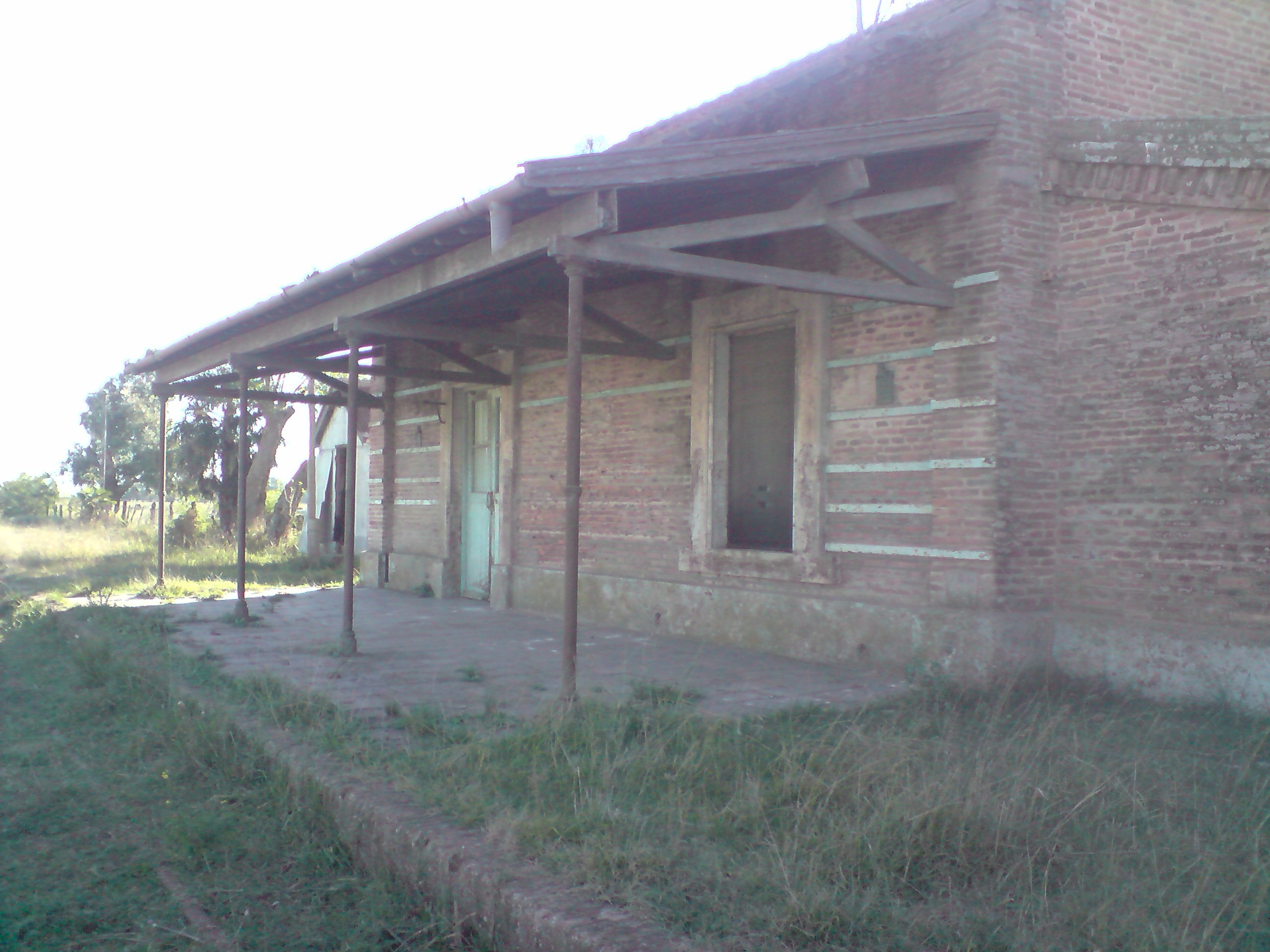
- Rail station, now abandoned

- Location within Buenos Aires Province
- Coordinates: 36°57′S 58°06′W
- Country: Argentina
- Province: Buenos Aires
- Partidos: General Guido
- Elevation: 22 m (72 ft)

Population (2001 Census)
  - Total: 819
- Time zone: UTC−3 (ART)
- CPA Base: B 7161
- Climate: Dfc

Labardén is a town located in the southern part of the General Guido Partido in the province of Buenos Aires, Argentina.

== History ==
As recently as 2014, no roads in the town were paved.

== Population ==
According to INDEC, which collects population data for the country, the town had a population of 819 people as of the 2001 census.
