= Santa Clara del Mar =

- Town
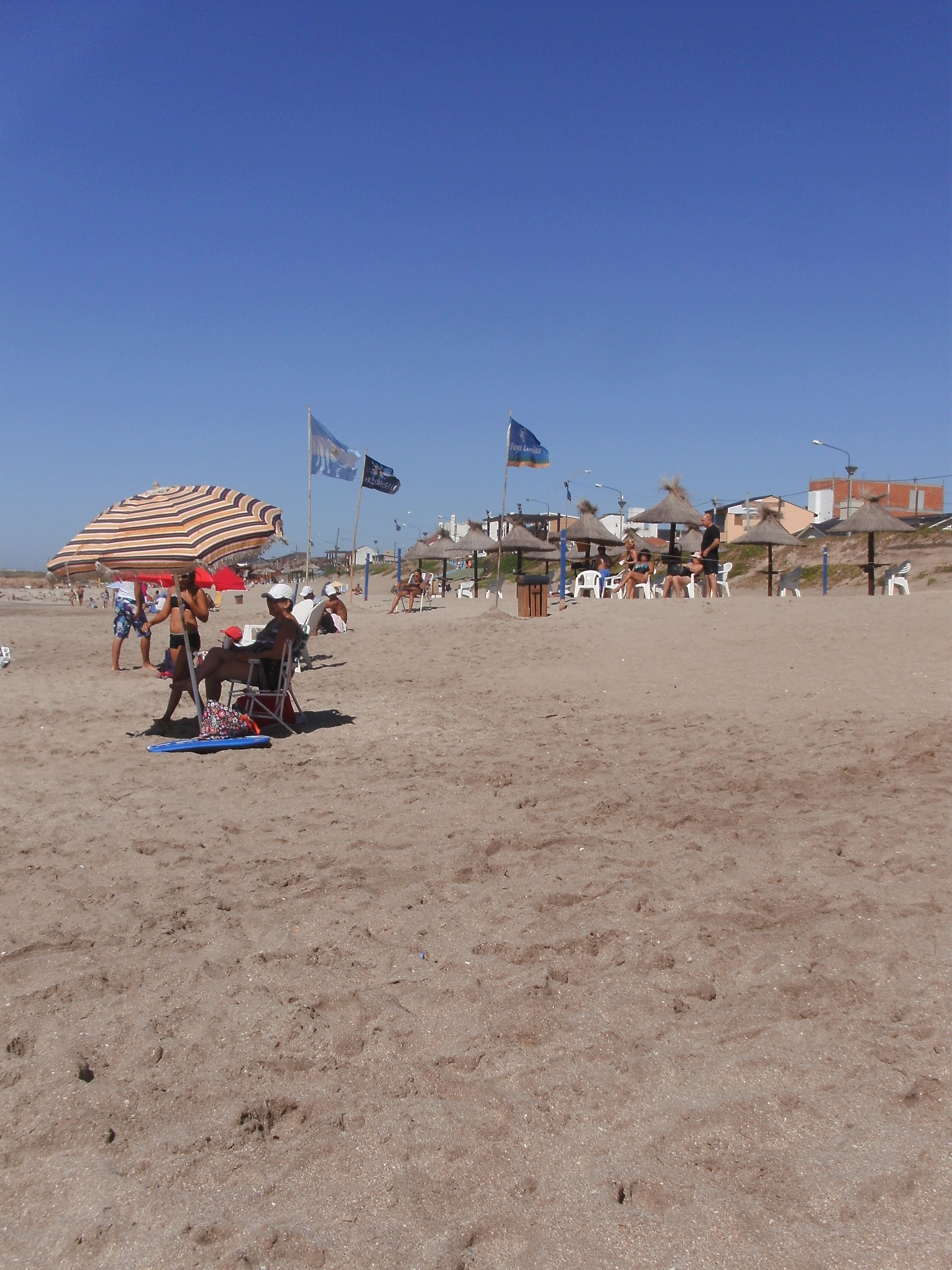
- Beachfront with tourists

- Location within Buenos Aires Province
- Coordinates: 37°50′S 57°31′W
- Country: Argentina
- Province: Buenos Aires
- Partidos: Mar Chiquita
- Established: February 20, 1949
- Elevation: 5 m (16 ft)

Population (2001 Census)
  - Total: 5,201
- Time zone: UTC−3 (ART)
- CPA Base: B 7609
- Area code: +54 223
- Climate: Dfc

Santa Clara del Mar is a resort town of the Atlantic Coast located in the Mar Chiquita Partido in the province of Buenos Aires, Argentina. In 2001 the town had a population of 5,201.

Due to its location, Santa Clara Del Mar is primarily a summer tourist destination, and the majority of the jobs in the area, as well as the town's economy, are reliant on it. The town is home to multiple spas, and several streets in the city are named after major spas across the world.

== Geography ==
Santa Clara Del Mar is located 18 km (11 mi) north of the city of Mar Del Plata and 386 km (240 mi) from Buenos Aires.

== History ==
The town was founded on February 20, 1949 by two brothers. The name of the town itself comes from one of the original owners of the area, a woman named Clara de Anchorena.

In 2023, a $504 million aqueduct between Santa Clara del Mar and the town of Mar Chiquita was completed, providing clean water to over 13,000 people.
