= Vivoratá =

- Town
- Location within Buenos Aires Province
- Coordinates: 37°40′S 57°38′W
- Country: Argentina
- Province: Buenos Aires
- Partidos: Mar Chiquita
- Established: September 12, 1886
- Elevation: 17 m (56 ft)

Population (2001 Census)
  - Total: 792
- Time zone: UTC−3 (ART)
- CPA Base: B 7612
- Climate: Dfc

Vivoratá is a town located in the Mar Chiquita Partido in the province of Buenos Aires, Argentina.

== Geography ==
Vivoratá is located 378 km (235 mi) from the city of Buenos Aires.

== History ==
Vivoratá was founded on September 12, 1886, upon the arrival of rail service on the General Roca Railway. A church was constructed in the town in 1911. It notably was not dedicated to a saint or virgin of any form. Rather, it was built in honor of the husband of the widow who oversaw the church's construction. The town suffered a major flood in 1960, in which the church sustained considerable damage. It closed in 1962. Since then, the now-abandoned church has been a site of alleged ghost encounters.

== Population ==
According to INDEC, which collects population data for the country, the town had a population of 792 people as of the 2001 census.

== Energy ==
Vivoratá will be the location of a large renewable power plant. Dubbed the Vivoratá Transformer Station, work began in 2014 and the project is expected to provide power to over a million Argentines. The power project will consist of 444 km (276 mi) of power lines connecting Vivoratá with the city of Bahía Blanca.

In 2023, a wind farm project consisting of 11 turbines was completed.
