= Estacion Camet =

- village
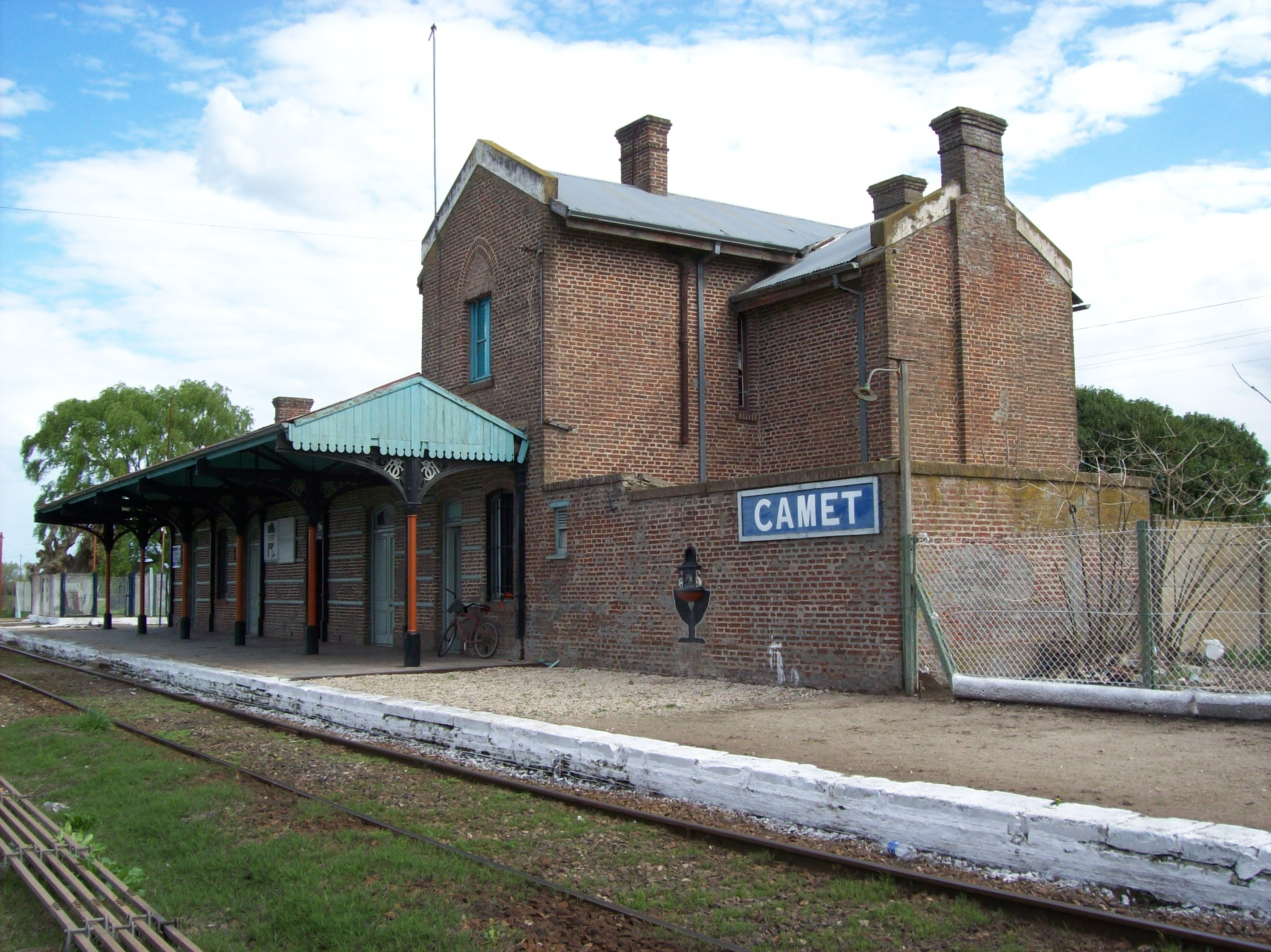
- Railway station

- Location of Estacion Camet in Argentina
- Coordinates: 37°53′06″S 57°36′16″W
- Country: Argentina
- Province: Buenos Aires Province
- Partido: General Pueyrredon

Government
  - Municipal Delegate: Pedro Lago (Cambiemos)

Area
  - Total: 11.29 km^{2} (4.36 sq mi)

Population (2010)
  - Total: 5,241
- Time zone: UTC−3 (ART)
- CPA base: S7600
- Dialing code: +54 0223
- Website: Delegacion Camet

Estacion Camet is a railway station and village some 5 km (3 mi) north of Mar del Plata, Buenos Aires province, Argentina. The settlement is commonly referred to as Camet. Camet is on the Route 2, from Buenos Aires to Mar del Plata.

Camet is the head of the North Municipal District (Delegación Norte) of General Pueyrredón district, which includes the neighbourhoods of Santa Angela, 2 de Abril, Las Margaritas, El Sosiego, La Laura, Castagnino, El Tejado, El Casal, Zorzales, Mil Quinientas Quintas, Colonia Barragan and Astor Piazzolla International Airport.

According to the 2010 census, Estacion Camet has a population of 5,241 inhabitants.
