= List of highways numbered 63A =

The following highways are numbered 63A:

== United States ==
- County Road 63A (Leon County, Florida)
- Nebraska Link 63A
- New York State Route 63A (former)
- Oklahoma State Highway 63A
