= Castelli, Buenos Aires =

Town in Buenos Aires Province, Argentina

Castelli
- Location in Argentina
- Coordinates: 36°06′S 57°47′W
- Country: Argentina
- Province: Buenos Aires
- Partido: Castelli
- Elevation: 3 m (9.8 ft)

Population (2001 census [INDEC])
  - Total: 6,402
- CPA Base: B 7114
- Area code: +54 2245

Castelli is a town in Buenos Aires Province, Argentina. It is the administrative centre for Castelli Partido.

== Population ==
According to INDEC, which collects population data for the country, the town had a population of 6,402 people as of the 2001 census.
