= Mar Chiquita Partido =

Mar Chiquita Partido de Mar Chiquita
- Department
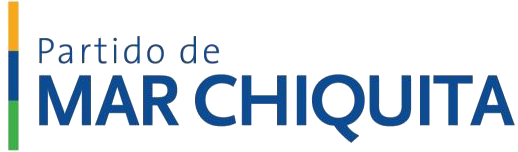

- location of Mar Chiquita in Buenos Aires Province
- Coordinates: 34°40′S 59°26′W
- Country: Argentina
- Established: December 25, 1839
- Founder: Juan Manuel de Rosas
- Seat: Coronel Vidal

Government
  - Intendant: Walter Wischnivetzky (PJ)

Area
  - Total: 3,114 km^{2} (1,202 sq mi)

Population
  - Total: 17,908
  - Density: 5.751/km^{2} (14.89/sq mi)
- Demonym: marchiquitense
- Postal Code: B7174
- IFAM: BUE079
- Area Code: 02265
- Website: www.marchiquita.gov.ar

Mar Chiquita Partido is a county (partido) located in the Atlantic coast of Buenos Aires Province in Argentina.

This provincial subdivision has a population of about 18,000 inhabitants in an area of 3,114 km^{2} (1,202 sq mi) and its county seat is Coronel Vidal.

== Economy ==
The economy of Mar Chiquita Partido is dominated by agriculture, cattle raising, and the summer tourist season (December-February).

== Settlements ==
- Coronel Vidal (pop. 6320)
- General Pirán (pop. 2896)
- Mar Chiquita (pop. 394)
- Santa Clara del Mar (pop. 5204)
- Atlántida (pop. 586)
- Camet Norte (pop. 150)
- Frente Mar (pop. 77)
- Mar de Cobo (pop. 406)
- La Baliza (pop. 94)
- La Caleta (pop. 63)
- La Armonía (pop. 105)
- Vivoratá (pop. 792)
