= Maipo Island =

Island in Palmer Archipelago, Antarctica

- Interactive map of Maipo Island

Geography
- Location: Antarctica
- Archipelago: Palmer Archipelago

Administration
- Antarctica

Maipo Island (64°25′S 62°17′W) is a low, snow-covered island lying at the entrance to Buls Bay in eastern Brabant Island, in the Palmer Archipelago, Antarctica. The island was first roughly charted by the Belgian Antarctic Expedition, 1897–99. The name appears on a 1947 Chilean government chart and commemorates the work of the Maipo, an oil tanker which participated in several Chilean Antarctic Expeditions during the 1940s and 1950s.

== See also ==
- List of Antarctic and sub-Antarctic islands
