= A63 =

A63 or A-63 may refer to:

- A63 road, a road in England connecting Leeds and Hull
- A63 motorway (France), a road connecting Bordeaux and the border with Spain
- A63 motorway (Germany), a road connecting Mainz and Kaiserslautern
- A63 motorway (Spain), a road connecting Oviedo and Canero
- Benoni Defense (Encyclopaedia of Chess Openings code A63)
