= Coronel Vidal =

- Location in Argentina
- Coordinates: 37°27′S 57°43′W
- Country: Argentina
- Province: Buenos Aires
- Partido: Mar Chiquita
- Founded: May 28, 1883
- Elevation: 15 m (49 ft)

Population (2001 census [INDEC])
  - Total: 6,320
- CPA Base: B 7174
- Area code: +54 2265

Coronel Vidal is a city in Buenos Aires Province, Argentina. It is the administrative centre for Mar Chiquita Partido. Its main commercial activity is agriculture. Every year, in February, the city is host of one of the biggest festivals in Buenos Aires, called "Fiesta Nacional del Potrillo" (Foal National Festival)

== Location ==
It is located at 343 kilometers of Autovía 2, south of Buenos Aires city and at 302 kilometers of La Plata city.

== Population ==
The current population is 6,611 inhabitants (Indec, 2010). This represents an increase of 4.6% against 6,320 inhabitants from the previous census (Indec, 2001).

== Cunicultural Production ==
In Coronel Vidal, cunicultural production has grown 4.200% since 1995. The breeding of rabbits for export continues gaining traction around the world.

== Historical background ==
The settlement was founded on 28 May 1883 by Dardo Rocha, and named in honour of Don Celestino Vidal, a hero of the Argentine War of Independence. Its primitive inhabitants called it as "Arbolito" (little tree), a name taken from the old station of the Southern Railroad.

== Infraestructure ==
The railroad crosses over the city center. It is connected towards the north with Buenos Aires and with Mar del Plata towards the south. Long-distance buses arrive at the city center every day coming from Capital Federal and the metropolitan region. Their road accesses are Autovía 2 and Ruta Provincial 55. The city has natural gas services, network electricity, sewers, running water, local radio and local cable TV, satellite TV, an office from Banco de la Provincia de Buenos Aires, hotel, restaurants, taxis, social and sport clubs, schools (all the levels), library, hospital, fire department, police station, post office, delegations from the main entities according to the national and regional government as well as a variety of intermediate institutions.
