= Lezama Partido =

Lezama Partido de Lezama
- Department

- Location of Lezama in Buenos Aires Province
- Coordinates: 35°52′S 57°54′W
- Country: Argentina
- Established: December 22, 2009
- Seat: Lezama

Government
  - Intendant: Arnaldo Harispe (UCR)

Population (approximately)
  - Total: 4,000
- Demonym: lezamense
- Postal Code: B7116, B7130
- Area Code: 02242
- Website: lezama.gov.ar

Lezama Partido is a partido of Buenos Aires Province in Argentina. It was established in 2009. It has a population of about 4,000.
