= Samborombón =

- Location in Argentina Samborombón (Buenos Aires Province)
- Coordinates: 35°13′S 58°16′W
- Country: Argentina
- Province: Buenos Aires
- Partido: Brandsen
- Elevation: 14 m (46 ft)

Population (2001 census [INDEC])
  - Total: 198
- CPA Base: B 1980
- Area code: +54 2223

Samborombón is a small rural community in Brandsen Partido in Buenos Aires Province, Argentina, located at Kilometer 90 of Route 2. The name Samborombón is a variation of San Borondón, the Spanish name of St. Brendan.

== Population ==
According to the last census the population count was 198 (2001 census [INDEC]).

== Are there two Samborombón? ==
About 10 km. southwest of Brandsen, near an old road that connected to Brandsen with Ranchos, is another place called Samborombón, which is often confused with the town. At that other Samborombón there is an abandoned train station of the former Rail Buenos Aires Province, a school, No. 16 of District Brandsen, and a few houses.

== See also ==
- Samborombón River
- Samborombón Bay
