= Lezama, Buenos Aires =

City in the province of Buenos Aires, Argentina

Coordinates: 35.875°S 57.898°W

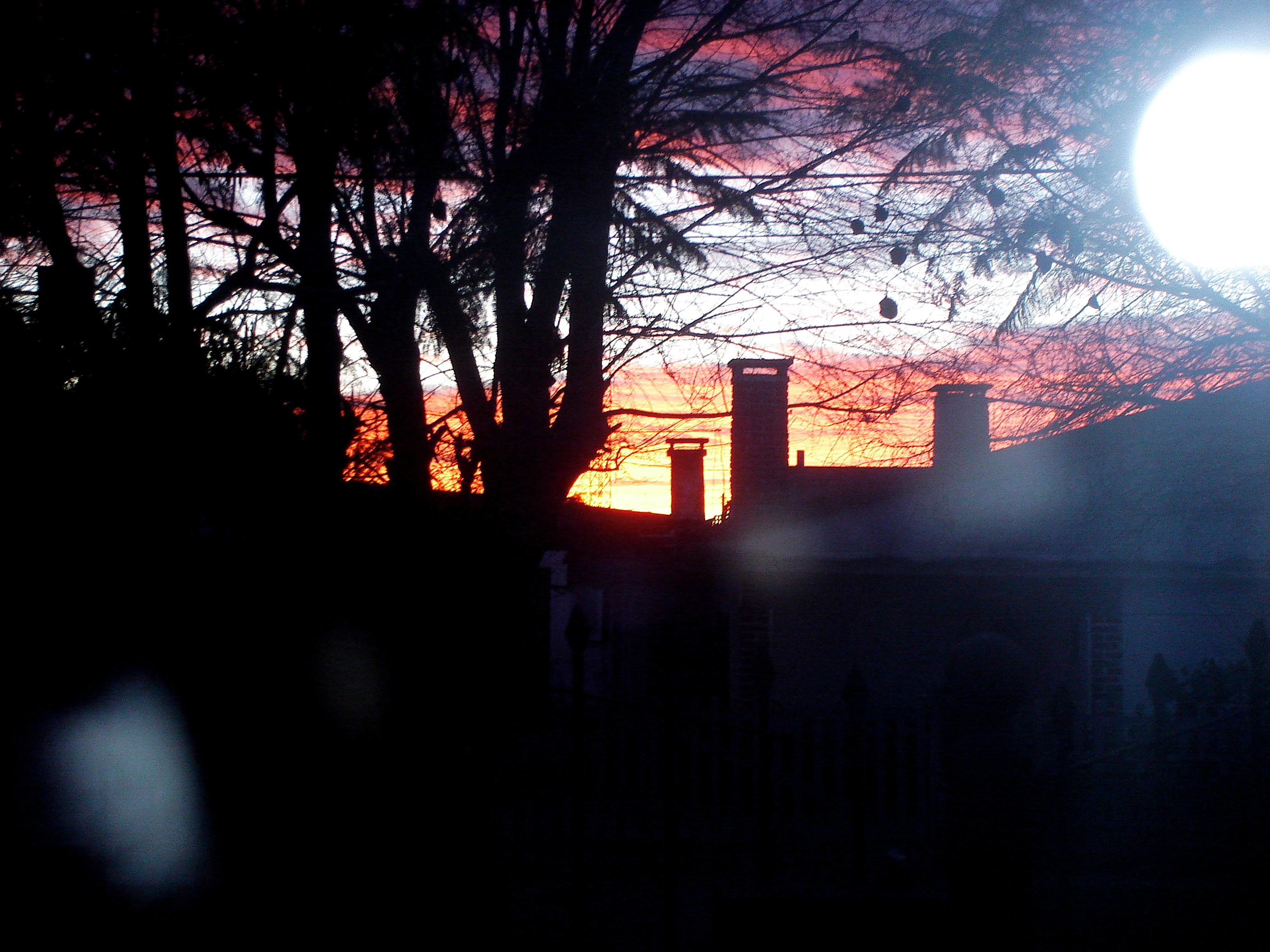

Lezama (officially Ciudad de Lezama, formerly Pueblo y Colonia de Manuel J. Cobo) is the administrative centre of the Lezama Partido in the Buenos Aires Province in Argentina. It is 157 km south of the centre of Buenos Aires. It has a population of about 4,500 people (2010).

== History ==
The city is named for José Gregorio Lezama (1802-1889), who was an agricultural merchant, landowner and philanthropist.

The Lezaman claim for autonomy dates to 22 December 1894, when the territory was annexed to the Chascomús Partido (department). Lezama was incorporated on 21 April 1913. In December 2009, 115 years after the request, the Lezama Partido gained autonomy. The Buenos Aires Provincial Legislature voted 58 in favor to 21 against (with one absence) in that vote.
