= Dolores, Buenos Aires =

Town in Buenos Aires Province, Argentina

Dolores
- Town
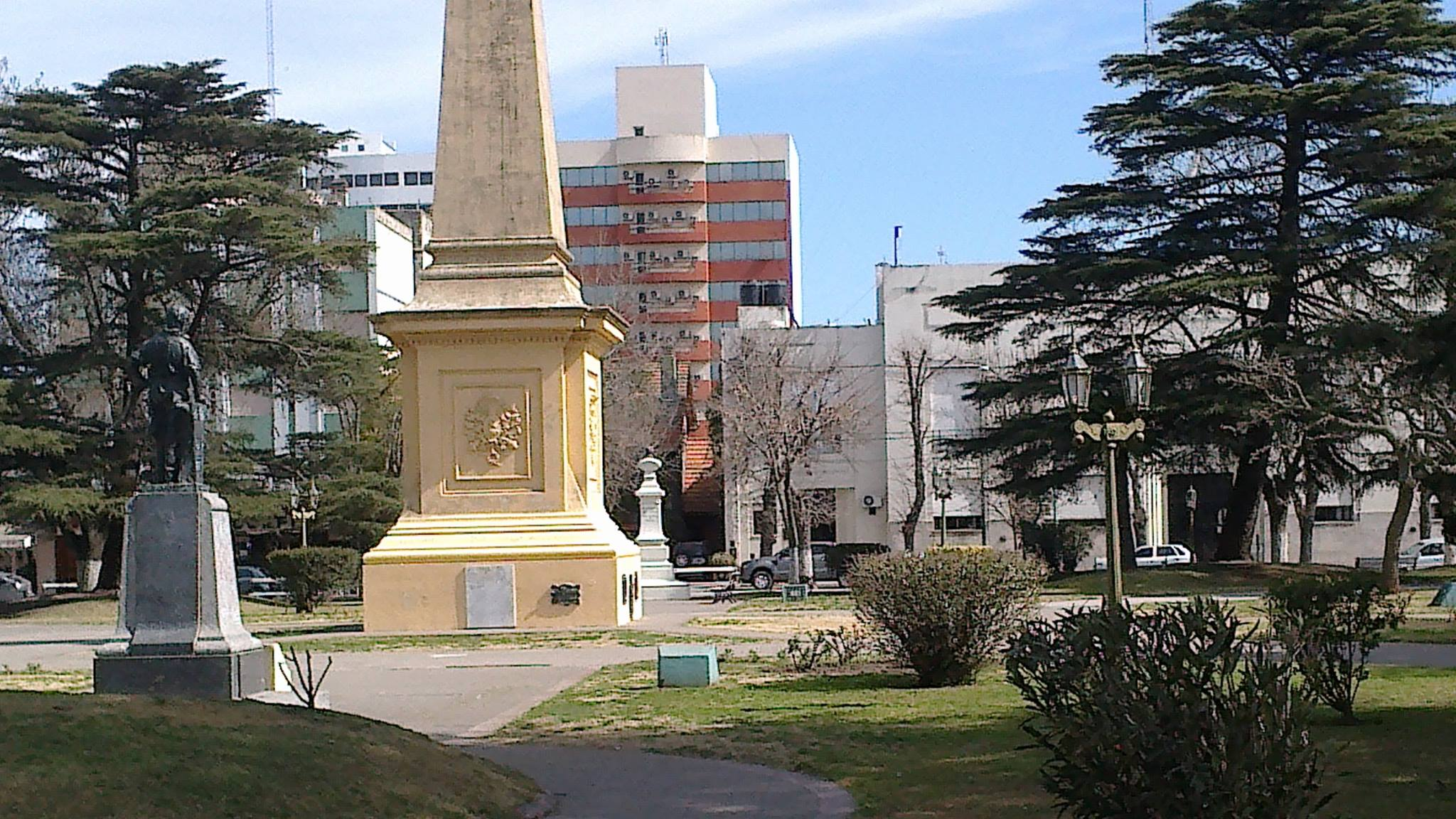
- Plaza Castelli, central square of Dolores
- Interactive map of Dolores
- Coordinates: 36°19′S 57°40′W
- Country: Argentina
- Province: Buenos Aires
- Partido: Dolores
- Founded: 21 August 1817
- Elevation: 6 m (20 ft)

Population (2010 census [INDEC])
  - Total: 25,940
- CPA Base: B 7100
- Area code: +54 2245

Dolores is a town in Buenos Aires Province, Argentina. It is the administrative centre for Dolores Partido. The town settlement was officially founded by Ramón Lara on 21 August 1817.

== 2008 March train disaster ==
On March 9, 2008 an intercity bus from the company El Rápido Argentino collided with a Ferrobaires passenger train with 250 passengers on board at a level crossing on the Provincial Highway 63 on the outskirts of Dolores, killing seventeen people and injuring at least twenty-five. The bus driver disregarded the railroad crossing signals, which at the time of the accident were operating properly.

== Climate ==
Dolores has an Oceanic climate (Köppen Cfb) closely bordering on a Humid subtropical climate (Köppen Cfa).

Climate data for Dolores, Buenos Aires (1991–2020, extremes 1961–present)
Month	Jan	Feb	Mar	Apr	May	Jun	Jul	Aug	Sep	Oct	Nov	Dec	Year
Record high °C (°F)	42.0 (107.6)	40.3 (104.5)	38.2 (100.8)	33.0 (91.4)	29.7 (85.5)	27.3 (81.1)	30.2 (86.4)	31.5 (88.7)	31.7 (89.1)	35.0 (95.0)	35.4 (95.7)	39.7 (103.5)	42.0 (107.6)
Mean daily maximum °C (°F)	28.5 (83.3)	27.5 (81.5)	25.6 (78.1)	21.8 (71.2)	17.9 (64.2)	14.5 (58.1)	13.6 (56.5)	15.9 (60.6)	17.7 (63.9)	20.7 (69.3)	24.0 (75.2)	27.3 (81.1)	21.2 (70.2)
Daily mean °C (°F)	21.8 (71.2)	21.0 (69.8)	19.0 (66.2)	15.2 (59.4)	11.8 (53.2)	8.8 (47.8)	8.0 (46.4)	10.0 (50.0)	11.9 (53.4)	14.9 (58.8)	17.8 (64.0)	20.5 (68.9)	15.1 (59.2)
Mean daily minimum °C (°F)	15.4 (59.7)	14.9 (58.8)	13.2 (55.8)	9.9 (49.8)	7.1 (44.8)	4.3 (39.7)	3.8 (38.8)	5.3 (41.5)	6.7 (44.1)	9.7 (49.5)	11.9 (53.4)	13.9 (57.0)	9.7 (49.5)
Record low °C (°F)	2.6 (36.7)	1.9 (35.4)	0.5 (32.9)	−4.2 (24.4)	−5.6 (21.9)	−9.6 (14.7)	−7.2 (19.0)	−6.9 (19.6)	−5.8 (21.6)	−2.7 (27.1)	−2.4 (27.7)	−0.6 (30.9)	−9.6 (14.7)
Average precipitation mm (inches)	109.2 (4.30)	94.2 (3.71)	96.3 (3.79)	99.4 (3.91)	58.7 (2.31)	62.1 (2.44)	62.1 (2.44)	73.2 (2.88)	64.3 (2.53)	93.9 (3.70)	91.4 (3.60)	81.8 (3.22)	986.6 (38.84)
Average precipitation days (≥ 0.1 mm)	8.0	7.5	8.0	7.9	6.8	6.7	7.4	6.6	6.9	9.2	8.5	8.0	91.5
Average snowy days	0.0	0.0	0.0	0.0	0.0	0.0	0.0	0.1	0.0	0.0	0.0	0.0	0.1
Average relative humidity (%)	72.7	76.5	79.5	82.0	84.7	85.2	84.7	81.8	79.6	78.0	74.5	74.1	79.4
Mean monthly sunshine hours	213.9	194.9	164.3	141.0	127.1	102.0	114.7	130.2	120.0	158.1	183.0	195.3	1,844.5
Mean daily sunshine hours	6.9	6.9	5.3	4.7	4.1	3.4	3.7	4.2	4.0	5.1	6.1	6.3	5.1
Source 1: Servicio Meteorológico Nacional
Source 2: Deutscher Wetterdienst (sun 1961–1990)

== Gallery ==
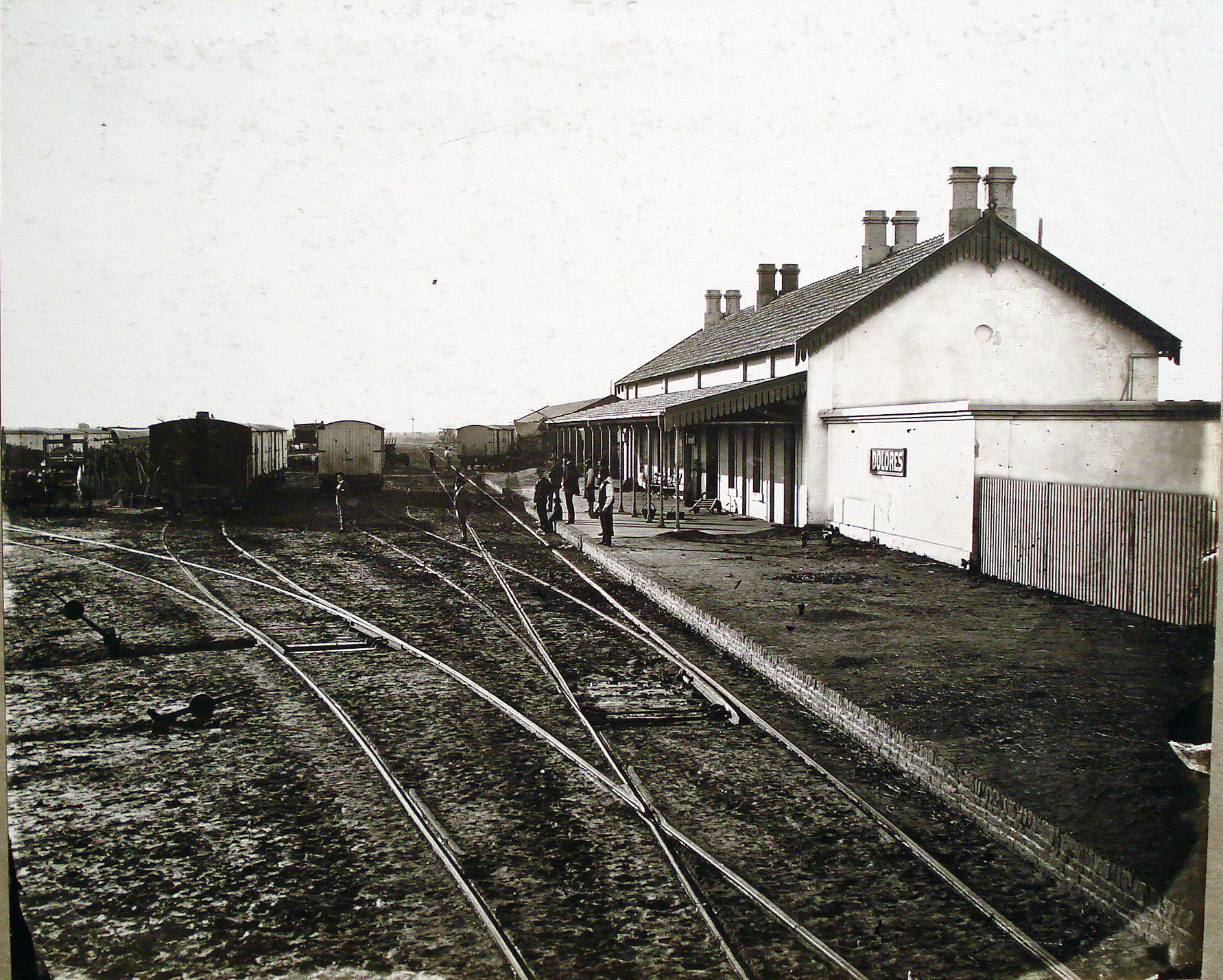
Train station (1880s)

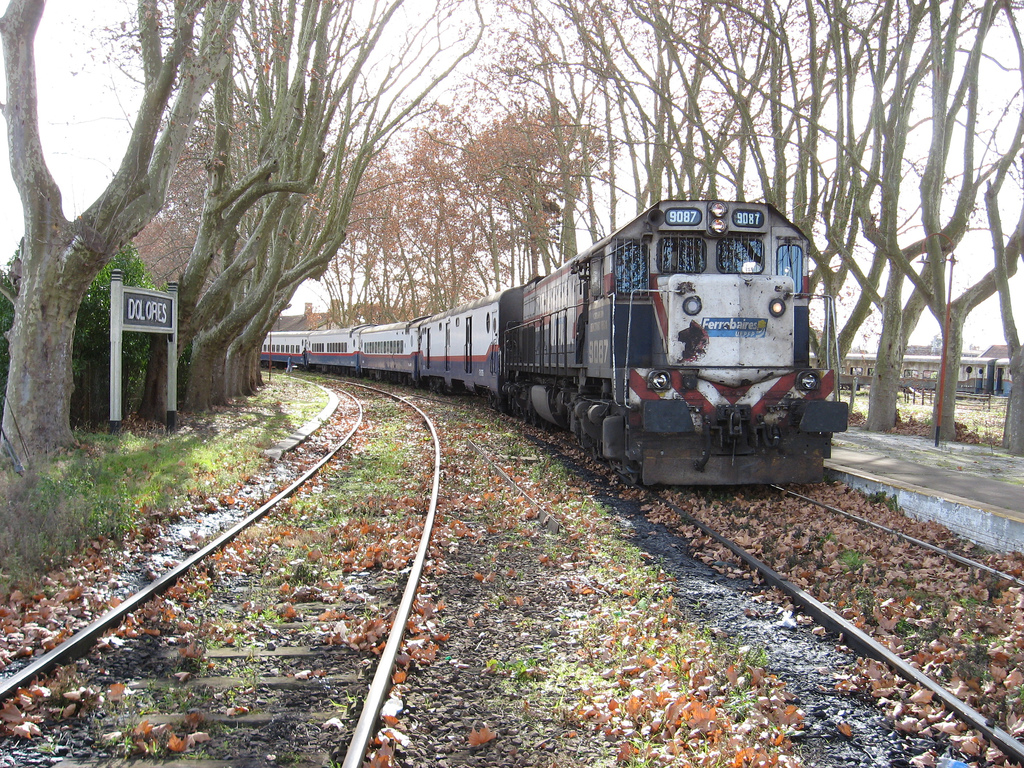
Train station (2007)

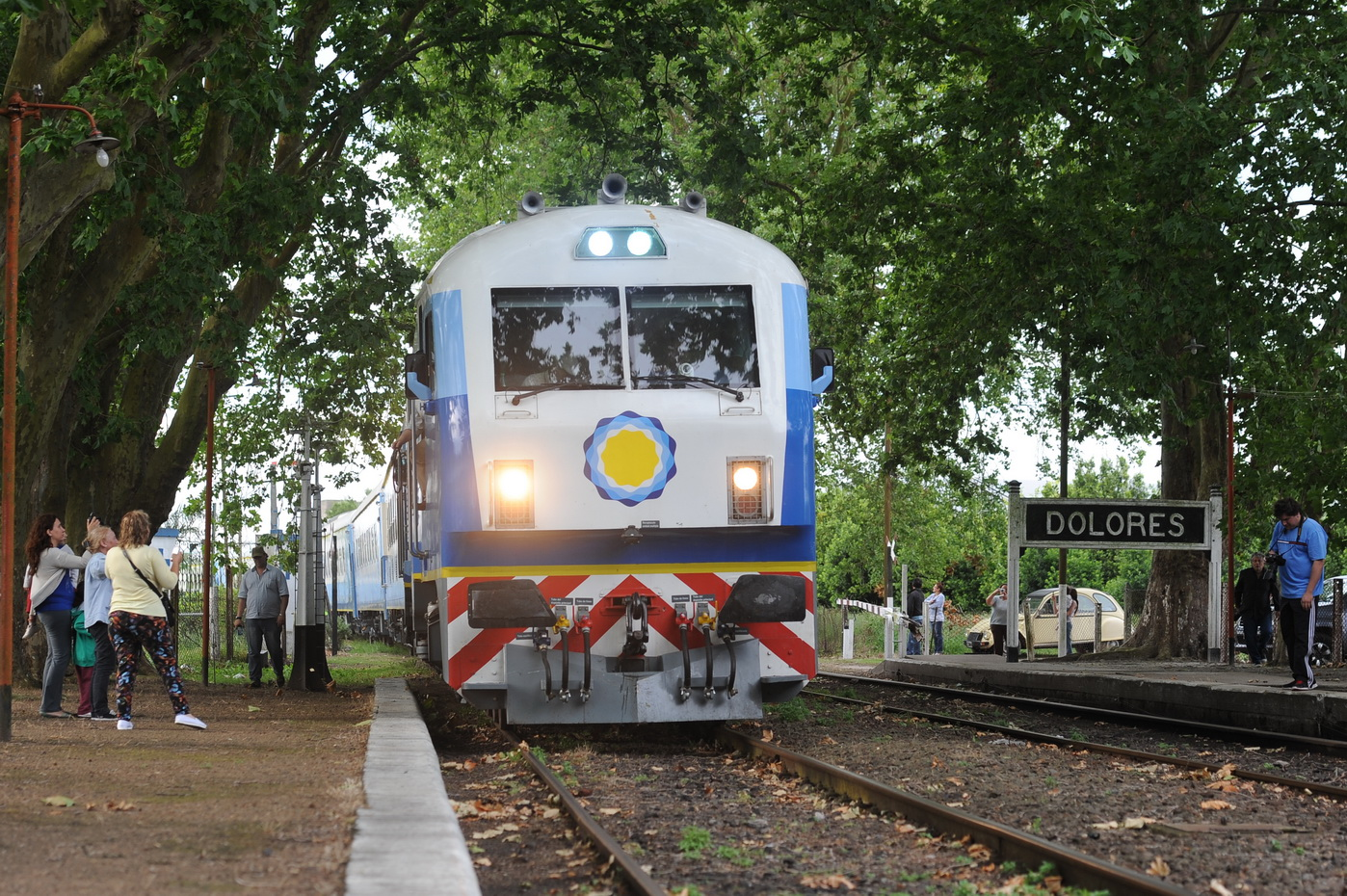
Train station (2014)

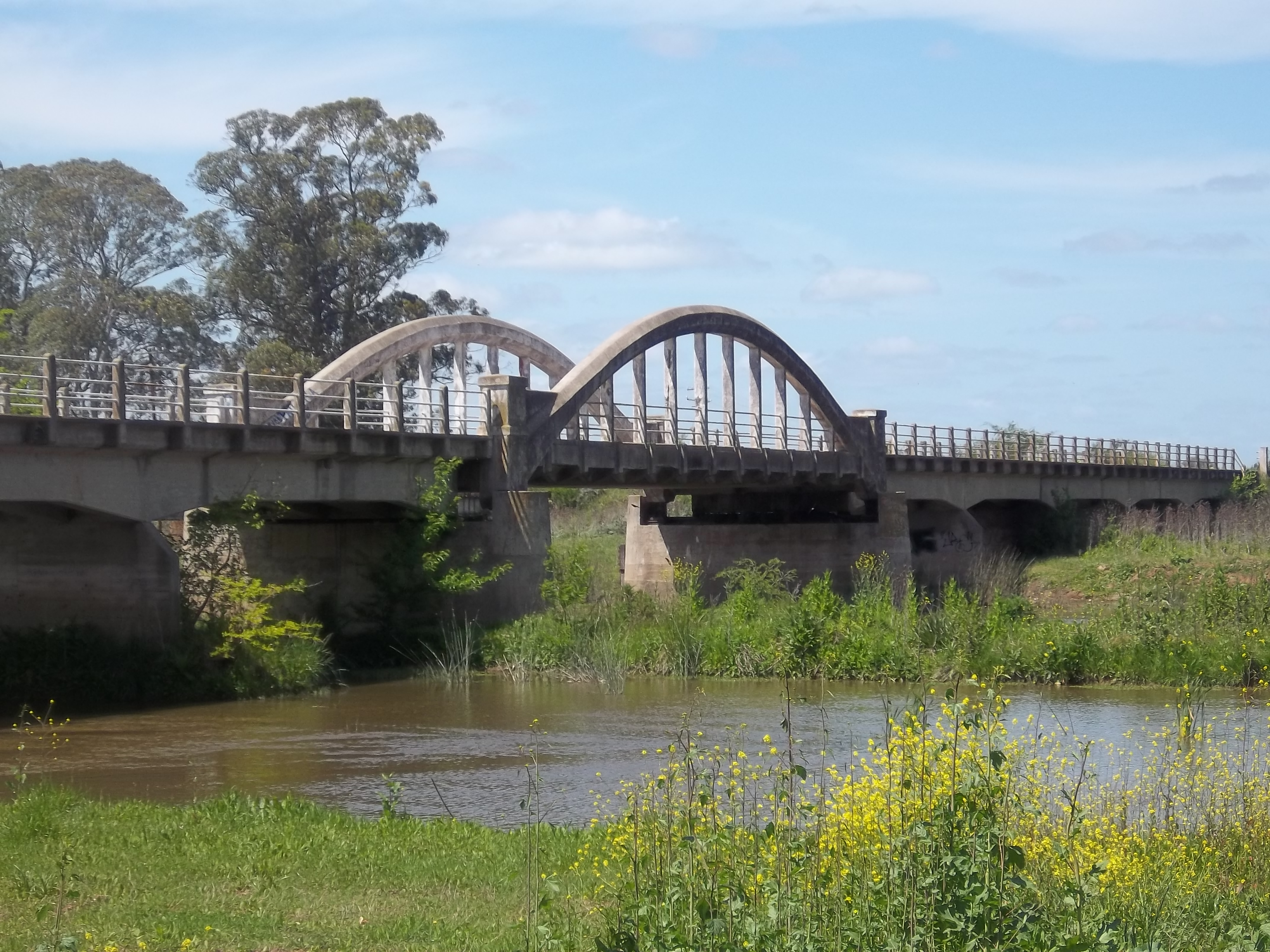
Old bridge

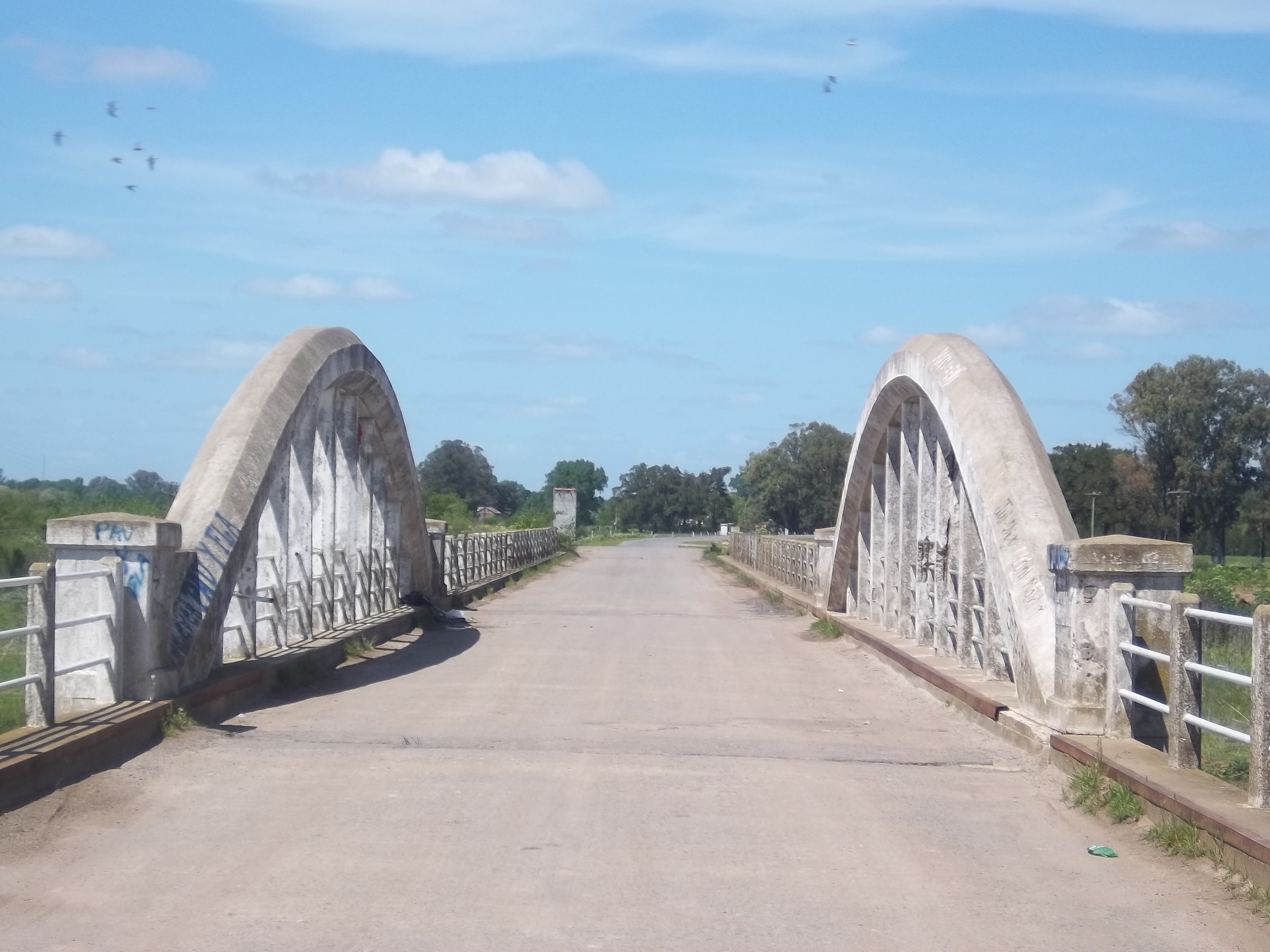
Old bridge (Route 2)
