= Tordillo Partido =

Tordillo Partido de Tordillo
- Department
- location of Tordillo Partido in Buenos Aires Province
- Coordinates: 36°30′S 57°19′W
- Country: Argentina

Government
  - Intendant: Héctor Aníbal Olivera (PJ)
- Postal Code: B7101
- IFAM: BUE124
- Patron saint: Eliot Lamas

Tordillo Partido is a partido of Buenos Aires Province in Argentina.
