= General Guido Partido =

General Guido Partido de General Guido
- Department
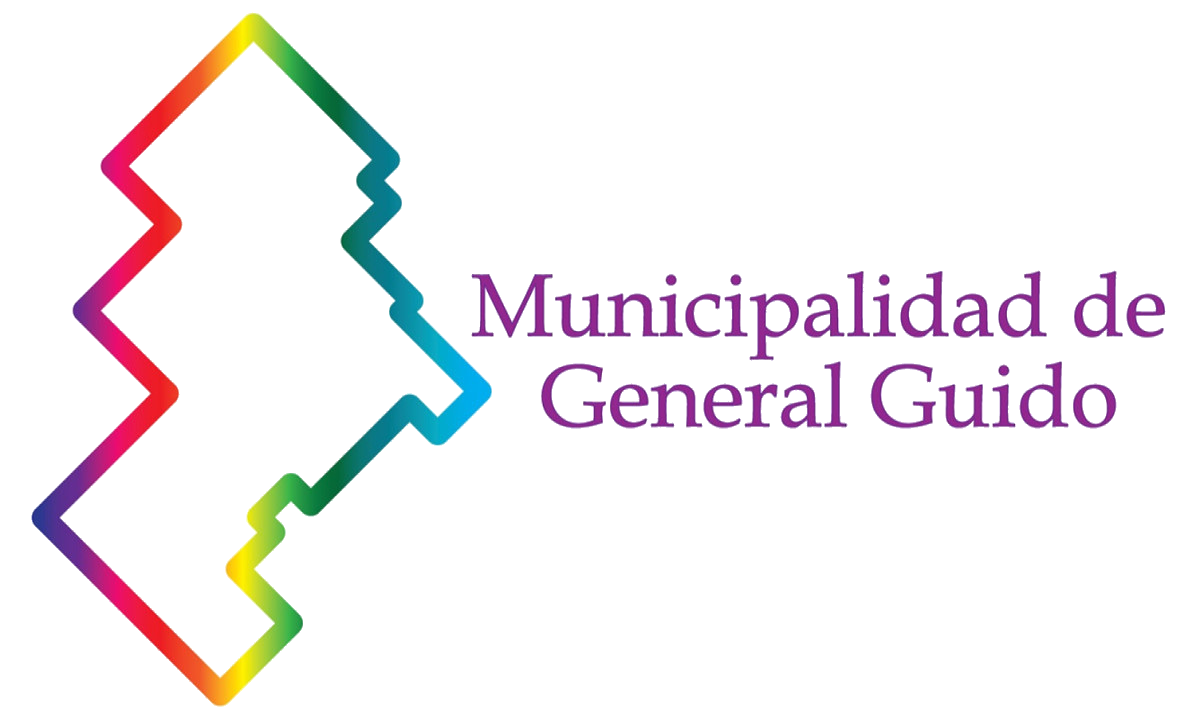

- location of General Guido Partido in Buenos Aires Province
- Coordinates: 36°39′S 57°47′W
- Country: Argentina
- Established: December 25, 1839; 186 years ago
- Founder: provincial law 441 Juan Manuel de Rosas
- Seat: General Guido

Government
  - Intendant: Carlos Rocha (Justicialist Party)

Area
  - Total: 2,340 km^{2} (900 sq mi)

Population
  - Total: 2,771
  - Density: 1.18/km^{2} (3.07/sq mi)
- Demonym: guidense
- Postal Code: B7118
- IFAM: BUE046
- Area Code: 02268
- Patron saint: Nuestra Señora de la Merced
- Website: generalguido.gob.ar

General Guido Partido is a partido in the eastern part of Buenos Aires Province in Argentina.

The provincial subdivision has a population of about 3,000 inhabitants in an area of 2,340 km^{2} (903 sq mi), and its capital city is General Guido.

== Settlements ==
- General Guido
- Labardén
- La Posta
- La Unión
