= Castelli Partido =

Castelli Partido de Castelli
- Department
- Logo

- location of Castelli partido in Buenos Aires Province
- Coordinates: 36°06′S 57°47′W
- Country: Argentina
- Seat: Castelli

Government
  - Intendant: Francisco Echarren (PJ)

Area
  - Total: 2,100 km^{2} (810 sq mi)

Population
  - Total: 7,852
  - Density: 3.7/km^{2} (9.7/sq mi)
- Demonym: castellino
- Postal Code: B7114
- IFAM: BUE023
- Area Code: 02245
- Website: castelli.gob.ar

Castelli Partido is a partido on the east coast of Buenos Aires Province in Argentina.

The provincial subdivision has a population of about 8,000 inhabitants in an area of 2,100 km^{2} (810 sq mi), and its capital city is Castelli, which is 180 km (110 mi) from Buenos Aires.

== Settlements ==
- Castelli
- Guerrero
- Cerro de La Gloria
