= General Guido =

- Location in Argentina
- Coordinates: 36°40′S 57°46′W
- Country: Argentina
- Province: Buenos Aires
- Partido: General Guido
- Elevation: 7 m (23 ft)

Population (2001 census [INDEC])
  - Total: 1,149
- CPA Base: B 7118
- Area code: +54 2268

General Guido is a town in Buenos Aires Province, Argentina. It is the administrative headquarters for General Guido Partido.
