= Maipú, Buenos Aires =

Maipú
- Location in Argentina
- Coordinates: 36°52′S 57°52′W
- Country: Argentina
- Province: Buenos Aires
- Partido: Maipú
- Founded: 1875
- Elevation: 19 m (62 ft)

Population (2001 census [INDEC])
  - Total: 8,865
- CPA Base: B 7160
- Area code: +54 2268

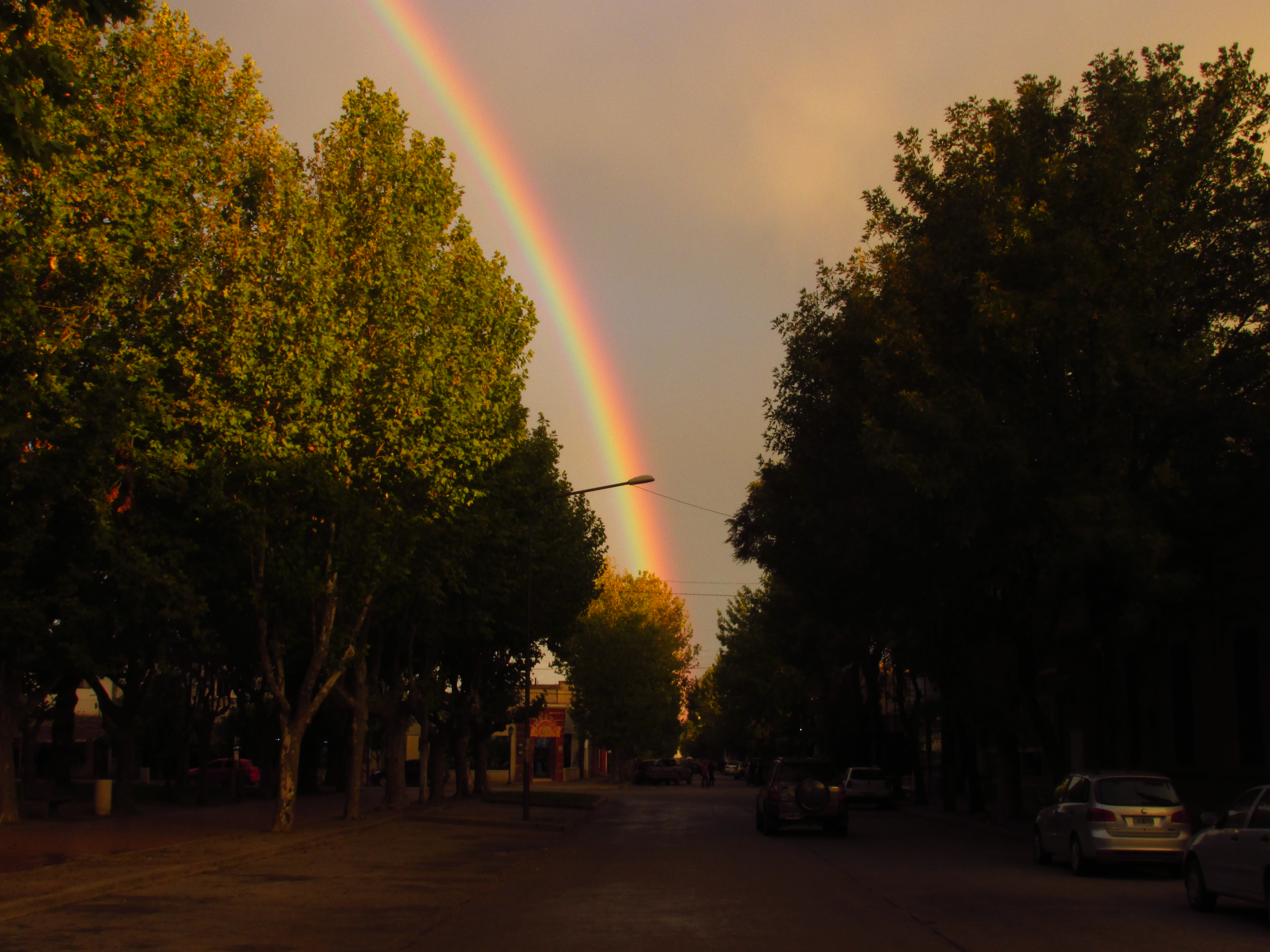
Rainbow in the city of Maipú, Province of Buenos Aires

Maipú is a town in Buenos Aires Province, Argentina. It is the administrative seat of Maipú Partido. It has a population of 8,865. Located in the Pampa, the land is low and swampy. The predominant activity in its catchment area is cattle breeding. It is a central service provider to the rural area.

Maipú is along Route 2. It is 264 kilometres (164 mi) from the Buenos Aires and 113 kilometres (70 mi) from Mar del Plata. The town was founded in 1875 by Francisco Bernabé Madero.

== History ==
The village that later became known Maipú was founded in 1864. On 17 April 1866, the Justice of the Peace Party, with headquarters at the Mari-Huincul, Don Enrique Sundbland, the only public land reserves remaining at the site, southeast of the current site for the foundation of a people. The land they had settled, the fledgling village, belonged to Francisco Bernabé Madero, bordering with the current party of General Guido. As of April 1, 1875 approving the route and the name requested by Madero, which was to Maipu. The work was completed on September 26, 1878, and decree declaring that date partido head, accepting the donations made by Madero land for the building of the court, municipality, school, church, square and cemetery.

== Sports ==
- Liga Maipuense de fútbol

== Notable people ==
- Francisco Bernabé Madero, politician, lawyer and an Argentine businessman, vice president of the nation between 1880 and 1886. He founded the city of Maipú.
- Oscar Alende, Argentine physician and politician, governor of the Province of Buenos Aires in 1958–1962, member of the nation on several occasions (1952–1955 and 1985–1996) and founder of the PI.
- Julian Camino, football player, champion Estudiantes de La Plata in the Metropolitan National 1982 and 1983. Argentina football team during the period 1983–1985. He was part of the coaching staff by Alejandro Sabella who led Estudiantes de La Plata (Libertadores champion 2009 and Opening 2010)

== Milestones ==
- In 1929 Juan Manuel Fangio dispute his first race as a companion Manuel Ayerza, on a '28 four-cylinder Chevrolet. The competition is played between Coronel Vidal and Maipú.
