= Maipú Partido =

Maipú Partido de Maipú
- Department
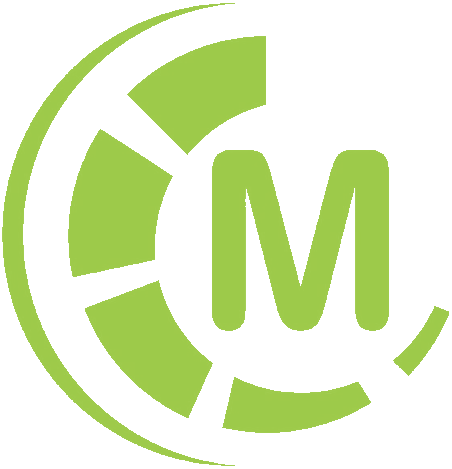

- location of Maipú Partido in Buenos Aires Province
- Coordinates: 36°52′S 57°52′W
- Country: Argentina
- Established: September 26, 1878
- Founder: provincial law 441
- Seat: Maipú

Government
  - Intendant: Matías Rappallini (UCR)

Area
  - Total: 2,640 km^{2} (1,020 sq mi)

Population
  - Total: 10,193
  - Density: 3.86/km^{2} (10.0/sq mi)
- Demonym: maipuense
- Postal Code: B7160
- IFAM: BUE077
- Area Code: 02268
- Website: maipu-gba.gob.ar

Maipú Partido is a partido in the east-central part of Buenos Aires Province in Argentina.

The provincial subdivision has a population of about 10,000 inhabitants in an area of 2,640 km^{2} (1,019 sq mi), and its capital city is Maipú.

== Economy ==
The economy of Maipú Partido is dominated by agriculture, the mainstays of the agricultural production being arable crops, cattle, and dairy products.

== Settlements ==
- Maipú (capital)
- Las Armas
- Monsalvo
- Santo Domingo
- Segurola
