= Capilla del Señor =

City in Buenos Aires Province, Argentina

- City
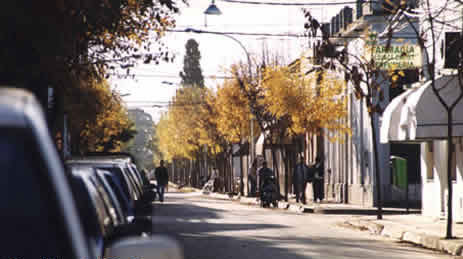
- A classical Capilla del Señor Street. The Church tower can be seen in the background.

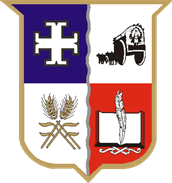
- Coat of arms
- Nickname: Cañada de la Cruz
- Location in Argentina
- Coordinates: 34°17′S 59°06′W
- Country: Argentina
- Province: Buenos Aires
- Partido: Exaltación de la Cruz
- Elevation: 15 m (49 ft)

Population (2010 census [INDEC])
  - Total: 9,244
- CPA Base: B 2812
- Area code: +54 2323
- Website: http://www.exaltaciondelacruz.gov.ar/ (in Spanish)

Capilla del Señor (Chapel of the Lord) is a city in the northern part of Buenos Aires Province, Argentina. It is the administrative seat of Exaltación de la Cruz Partido; which is bounded by the Zárate, Campana, Pilar, Luján, San Antonio de Areco, San Andrés de Giles partidos. It has been designated by the former president Carlos Saúl Menem as the "First National Historical Town" in Argentina. It is located 82 kilometres (51 mi) from Buenos Aires, 24 km (15 mi) from Zárate, 27 km (17 mi) from Pilar, 30 km (19 mi) from Campana and Luján, 47 km (29 mi) from San Antonio de Areco, and 49 km (30 mi) from San Andrés de Giles.
