= Los Cardales =

- Location in Argentina Los Cardales (Buenos Aires Province)
- Coordinates: 34°20′S 59°00′W
- Country: Argentina
- Province: Buenos Aires
- Partido: Exaltación de la Cruz
- Elevation: 25 m (82 ft)

Population (2001 census [INDEC])
  - Total: 5,342
- CPA Base: B 2814
- Area code: +54 2322

Los Cardales is a village in Buenos Aires Province, Argentina, belonging to Exaltación de la Cruz Partido, of which capital is Capilla del Señor. Exaltación de la Cruz Partido is located between the Zárate, Campana, San Antonio de Areco, San Andrés de Giles, Luján, and Pilar partidos.

== Population ==
The local population includes 5,342 (2001 census [INDEC]) inhabitants, which represents an increase of 51.41% against the 3,528 (1991 census [INDEC]) inhabitants of the previous census. In the 2001 census it was considered an urban area within the Alto Los Cardales in the Campana Partido and increased to 7,705 citizens(2001 census [INDEC]).

== Railway ==
Los Cardales contains a section of railway belonging to the Ferrocarril General Bartolomé Mitre. Rail schedules include 7 trains traveling via Victoria and Capilla del Señor. The concessionaire is the company Trenes de Buenos Aires, though since 1995 the station has been a train stop only.

== Fogata de San Juan (Saint John's Eve) ==
Since 1994, the bonfire is lit every June 21, which is the winter solstice day, Fogata de San Juan.
