= Facundo Manes =

Argentine neurologist and politician

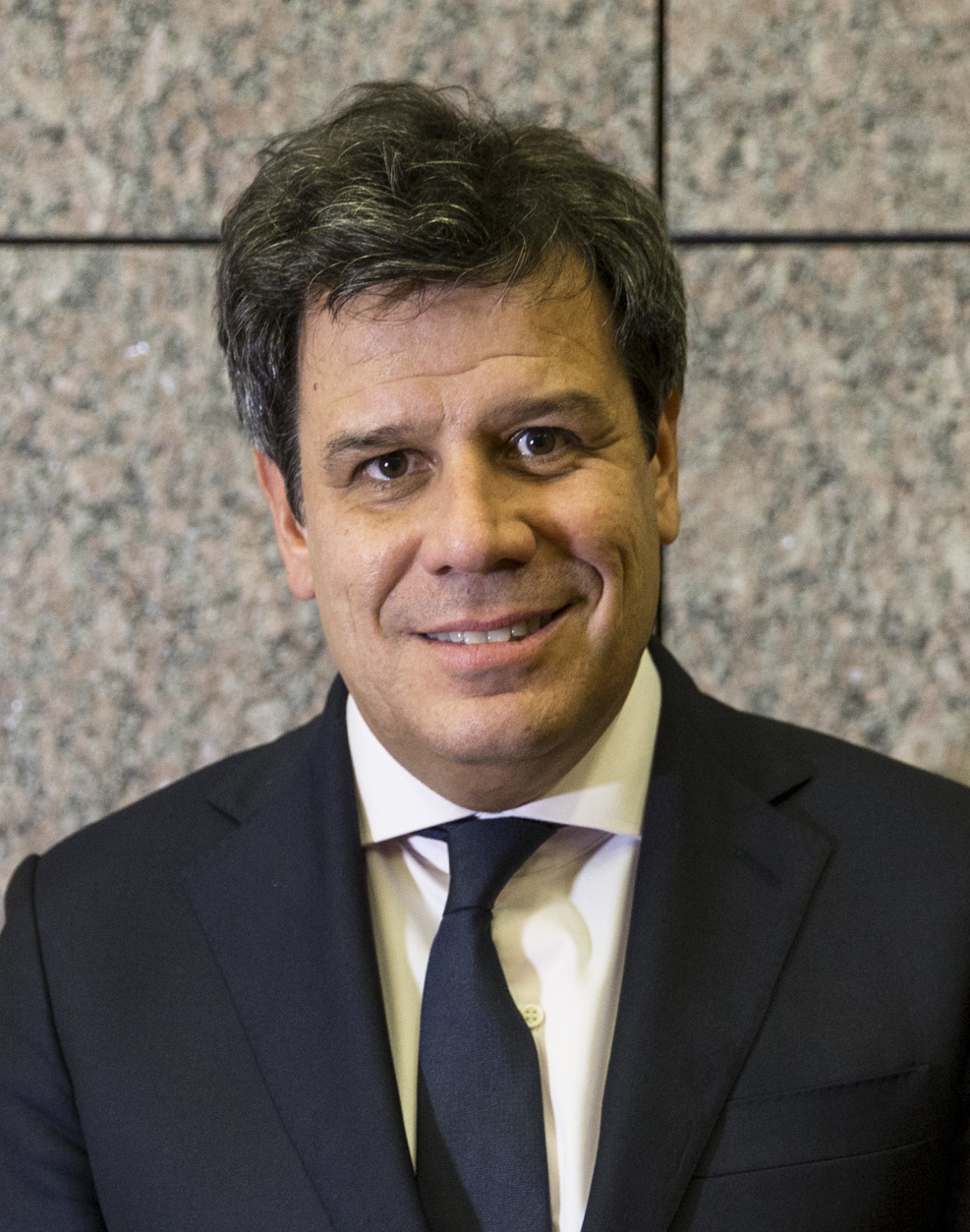

National Deputy
- Incumbent
- Assumed office 10 December 2021
- Constituency: Buenos Aires

Personal details
- Born: 11 January 1969 (age 57) Quilmes, Argentina
- Party: Radical Civic Union
- Education: University of Buenos Aires
- Occupation: Neurologist • politician

Facundo Manes (born 11 January 1969) is an Argentine neurologist and politician. Since 2021, he has been a National Deputy of Argentina elected in Buenos Aires Province. He is a member of the Radical Civic Union (UCR).

== Biography ==
Manes was born on 11 January 1969 in Quilmes, in the Greater Buenos Aires. He grew up in Arroyo Dulce, a rural town in the Salto Partido of Buenos Aires Province. His father, Pablo Manes, was a rural doctor from Tucumán, while his mother, Dora Blazevich, was a native of Salto.

Manes studied at the University of Buenos Aires Faculty of Medical Sciences.

== Electoral history ==
Electoral history of Facundo Manes
| Election | Office | List | # | District | Votes | | | Result | Ref. |
| Election | Office | List | # | District | Total | % | P. | Result | Ref. |
|---|---|---|---|---|---|---|---|---|---|
| 2021 | National Deputy | Juntos por el Cambio | 3 | Buenos Aires Province | 3,550,321 | 39.77% | 1st (Note: Presented on an electoral list. The data shown represents the share of the vote the entire party/alliance received in that constituency.) | Elected | |
