= San Cayetano =

San Cayetano (Saint Cajetan in English) was a Catholic saint (1480-1547), and may refer to:

- San Cayetano, Buenos Aires, capital of San Cayetano Partido
  - San Cayetano Partido, Buenos Aires Province, Argentina
- San Cayetano, Norte de Santander, Colombia
- San Cayetano, Cundinamarca, Colombia
- San Cayetano (Asunción), a neighborhood of Asunción, Paraguay
