= Cucullú =

- Town
- Location within Buenos Aires Province
- Coordinates: 34°27′S 59°21′W
- Country: Argentina
- Province: Buenos Aires
- Partidos: San Andrés de Giles
- Established: May 24, 1889
- Elevation: 34 m (112 ft)

Population (2001 Census)
  - Total: 435
- Time zone: UTC−3 (ART)
- CPA Base: B 6723
- Climate: Dfc

Cucullú is a town located in the San Andrés de Giles Partido in the province of Buenos Aires, Argentina. The town consists of 10 blocks.

== Geography ==
Cucullú is located 10 km (6.2 mi) from the town of San Andrés de Giles and 98 km (61 mi) from the city of Buenos Aires.

== History ==
Cucullú was founded on May 24, 1889 upon the inauguration of a railway station in what would become the town. Construction of the station was led by Federico Lacroze, a railway entrepreneur. The town is named after Don Juan Simón de Cucullú, a Basque settler who donated the land. The Club Atlético Cucullú, an athletic organization, was founded in 1929. A chapel was constructed in the town in 1960. With the exception of the town's main road, no streets in Cucullú are paved. Rail service to Cucullú ended in 1998.

== Economy ==
In addition to ceramics, the town is a center for agricultural production due to its location in the rural Pampas.

== Culture ==
Cucullú is a center for artisan pottery production in Argentina, with several clay statues and various brick ovens located in the town. A yearly holiday, the Fiesta del Hornero, is celebrated in honor of the artisans of the town. The festival was first celebrated in 2006 and is held every October 30. There are around 20 furnaces located in the town.

== Population ==
According to INDEC, which collects population data for the country, the town had a population of 435 people as of the 2001 census.
