= Pila =

Pila may refer to:

== Architecture ==
- Pila (architecture), a type of veranda in Sri Lankan farm houses

== Places ==
- Pila, Buenos Aires, a town in Buenos Aires Province, Argentina
- Pila Partido, a country subdivision in Buenos Aires Province, Argentina
- Pila, Croatia, a village in Croatia
- Pila (Karlovy Vary District), a municipality in the Czech Republic
- Pila, Aosta Valley, a ski resort in Italy
- Pila, Piedmont, a municipality in Italy
- Pila, a Barangay in San Pascual, Batangas, Philippines
- Pila, Laguna, a municipality in the Philippines
- Piła (disambiguation), various towns in Poland
- Píla (disambiguation), several villages in Slovakia

== Latin ==
- Pila, a flat type of tile, used in Pilae stacks
- Pila, the plural of pilum, a heavy javelin used in ancient Rome

== Other uses ==
- Pila (gastropod), a genus of African and Asian apple snails containing around 30 species
