= Arenales =

Arenales may refer to:

- Arenales, Aguadilla, Puerto Rico
- Arenales River (Spanish: Río Arenales), a river of Argentina
- Cerro Arenales, a volcano in Chile
- Juan Antonio Álvarez de Arenales also known as General Arenales (1770-1831), Argentinian general of Spanish origin
- Bryan Arenales (born 1996), American financial accountant, influencer and winner of Love Island USA

== See also ==
- General Arenales, a town in Argentina, administrative centre of the General Arenales Partido
- General Arenales Partido, a partido on the northern border of Buenos Aires Province in Argentina
- Arenales de San Gregorio, a municipality in the province of Ciudad Real, Castile-La Mancha, Spain
