= Berdier =

- Town
- Location within Buenos Aires Province
- Coordinates: 34°24′S 60°16′W
- Country: Argentina
- Province: Buenos Aires
- Partidos: Salto
- Established: February 15, 1910
- Elevation: 49 m (161 ft)

Population (2001 Census)
  - Total: 161
- Time zone: UTC−3 (ART)
- CPA Base: B 2743
- Climate: Dfc

Berdier is a town located in the Salto Partido in the province of Buenos Aires, Argentina.

== Geography ==
Berdier is located 10 km (6.2 mi) from the town of Salto, and 95 km (59 mi) from the city of Buenos Aires.

== History ==
Berdier was founded on February 15, 1910, on land donated by a pair of sisters, who had chosen to do so after a rail line was built a year earlier in 1909. The town was named after the father of the two donors. Berdier itself was primarily settled by immigrants of Spanish and Italian origin. The design of the town was overseen by Valentín Virasoro, an engineer.

Rail service to the town ended in the 1990s, leading to a major decline in the town's population, although local plans have been proposed to reverse this.

== Population ==
During its peak years, the town had a population of around 2,000. According to INDEC, which collects population data for the country, the town had a population of 161 people as of the 2001 census.
