= USS LST-964 =

Tank landing ship in the United States Navy

History

United States
- Name: LST-964
- Builder: Bethlehem-Hingham Shipyard, Hingham, Massachusetts
- Yard number: 3434
- Laid down: 24 October 1944
- Launched: 22 November 1944
- Commissioned: 16 December 1944
- Decommissioned: 27 June 1946
- Stricken: 15 August 1946
- Identification: Hull symbol: LST-964; Code letters: NKGA
- Fate: Sold for conversion to merchant service, 17 January 1947

Argentina
- Name: San Juan Bosco
- Owner: Compania Naviera SA and Commercial Perez Companc
- Route: Belém, Pará, Brazil to Ushuaia, Tierra del Fuego, Argentina
- Fate: Sold
- Name: Ionian Sea
- Owner: The Carrier Co.
- Fate: Sold, 1974

Brazil
- Owner: Dalmine Deguara Siderca Company, Campana, Brazil
- Status: Fate unknown

General characteristics
- Class & type: LST-542-class tank landing ship
- Displacement: 1,625 long tons (1,651 t) (light); 4,080 long tons (4,145 t) (full (seagoing draft with 1,675 short tons (1,520 t) load); 2,366 long tons (2,404 t) (beaching)
- Length: 328 ft (100 m) oa
- Beam: 50 ft (15 m)
- Draft: Unloaded: 2 ft 4 in (0.71 m) forward; 7 ft 6 in (2.29 m) aft; Full load: 8 ft 3 in (2.51 m) forward; 14 ft 1 in (4.29 m) aft; Landing with 500 short tons (450 t) load: 3 ft 11 in (1.19 m) forward; 9 ft 10 in (3.00 m) aft; Limiting 11 ft 2 in (3.40 m); Maximum navigation 14 ft 1 in (4.29 m)
- Installed power: 2 × 900 hp (670 kW) Electro-Motive Diesel 12-567A diesel engines; 1,800 shp (1,300 kW)
- Propulsion: 1 × Falk main reduction gears; 2 × Propellers
- Speed: 11.6 kn (21.5 km/h; 13.3 mph)
- Range: 24,000 nmi (44,000 km; 28,000 mi) at 9 kn (17 km/h; 10 mph) while displacing 3,960 long tons (4,024 t)
- Boats & landing craft carried: 2 x LCVPs
- Capacity: 1,600–1,900 short tons (3,200,000–3,800,000 lb; 1,500,000–1,700,000 kg) cargo depending on mission
- Troops: 16 officers, 147 enlisted men
- Complement: 13 officers, 104 enlisted men
- Armament: Varied, ultimate armament; 2 × twin 40 mm (1.57 in) Bofors guns; 4 × single 40 mm Bofors guns; 12 × 20 mm (0.79 in) Oerlikon cannons

Service record
- Part of: LST Flotilla 31
- Awards: China Service Medal; American Campaign Medal; Asiatic–Pacific Campaign Medal; World War II Victory Medal; Navy Occupation Service Medal w/Asia Clasp

USS LST-964 was an LST-542-class tank landing ship in the United States Navy. Like many of her class, she was not named and is properly referred to by her hull designation.

== Construction ==
LST-964 was laid down on 24 October 1944, at Hingham, Massachusetts, by the Bethlehem-Hingham Shipyard; launched on 22 November 1944; sponsored by Mrs. Ailene Borland; and commissioned on 16 December 1944.

== Service history ==
Following the war, she performed occupation duty in the Far East and saw service in China until early April 1946. She returned to the United States and was decommissioned on 27 June 1946, and struck from the Navy list on 15 August, that same year. On 17 January 1947, the ship was sold to Campania Naviera y Commercial Perez Compano S.A. for operation.

She was later sold to the Carrier Company and renamed Ionian Sea. In 1974, she was again sold, to Dalmine Deguara Siderca Company at Campana, Brazil, on the Paraná River.

== Bibliography ==
Online resources

- "LST-964". Dictionary of American Naval Fighting Ships. Naval History and Heritage Command. 4 August 2015. This article incorporates text from this source, which is in the public domain.
- "Bethlehem-Hingham, Hingham MA". www.ShipbuildingHistory.com. 11 August 2011.
- "USS LST-964". NavSource. 22 March 2013.
