= Diego Gaynor =

- Town
- Location within Buenos Aires Province
- Coordinates: 34°17′S 59°14′W
- Country: Argentina
- Province: Buenos Aires
- Partidos: Exaltación de la Cruz
- Established: 1894
- Elevation: 35 m (115 ft)

Population (2001 Census)
  - Total: 198
- Time zone: UTC−3 (ART)
- CPA Base: B 2812
- Climate: Dfc

Diego Gaynor is a town located in the Exaltación de la Cruz Partido in the province of Buenos Aires, Argentina.

== Geography ==
Diego Gaynor is located 99 km (62 mi) from the city of Buenos Aires.

== History ==
Diego Gaynor was founded in 1894 following the construction of a rail station with service under the Ferrocarril Central Argentino. The town was named after the father of the founder. The Gaynor family, who founded the town, lived in the area until 1892. Rail service to the town ended in 1992.

== Population ==
According to INDEC, which collects population data for the country, the town had a population of 198 people as of the 2001 census.
