= Ascensión, Buenos Aires =

Ascensión
- Town
- Location within Buenos Aires Province
- Coordinates: 34°13′S 61°07′W
- Country: Argentina
- Province: Buenos Aires
- Partidos: General Arenales
- Established: February 1, 1890
- Elevation: 88 m (289 ft)

Population (2001 Census)
  - Total: 4,109
- Time zone: UTC−3 (ART)
- CPA Base: B 6003
- Climate: Dfc

Ascensión is a town located in the General Arenales Partido in the province of Buenos Aires, Argentina.

== History ==
Ascensión was founded on February 1, 1890, when the town's establishment was approved by the government. A school was built in 1895, and rail service began in 1911.

== Population ==
According to INDEC, which collects population data for the country, the town had a population of 4,109 people as of the 2001 census.
