= General Rivas =

- Town
- Location within Buenos Aires Province
- Coordinates: 34°37′S 59°46′W
- Country: Argentina
- Province: Buenos Aires
- Partidos: Suipacha
- Established: 1875
- Elevation: 52 m (171 ft)

Population (2001 Census)
  - Total: 472
- Time zone: UTC−3 (ART)
- CPA Base: B 6614
- Climate: Dfc

General Rivas is a town located in the Suipacha Partido in the province of Buenos Aires, Argentina.

== Geography ==
General Rivas is located 152 km (94 mi) from the city of Buenos Aires.

== History ==
The region that now makes up the town was likely first explored by the Spanish in either the 1790s or the early 1800s.

General Rivas was founded in 1875. Rivas was established on lands belonging to Don Francisco Alori. The town was named after Ignacio Rivas, a general who fought in the Battle of Caseros. A church, the San Roque Chapel, was constructed in Rivas in 1898. A railway station in the town was completed in 1890.

== Population ==
According to INDEC, which collects population data for the country, the town had a population of 427 people as of the 2001 census.
