= Arboleda (disambiguation) =

Arboleda is a town and municipality in Colombia. Arboleda may also refer to

- Arboledas, municipality in Colombia
- Arboledas, Argentina
- Adriana Arboleda, Colombian model and presenter
- Danilo Arboleda, Colombian footballer
- Harold Arboleda, Filipino basketball player
- Manuel Arboleda, Colombian footballer
- Mireya Arboleda, Colombian classical pianist
- Níver Arboleda, Colombian footballer
- Robert Arboleda, Ecuadorian footballer
- William Arboleda, Colombian footballer
- Wynne Arboleda, Filipino basketball player
- Yazmany Arboleda, Colombian-American artist
