= General Paz =

General Paz may refer to

- The Argentine military leader José María Paz
- The Avenida General Paz avenue of Buenos Aires
- The General Paz Partido from the province of Buenos Aires
- The General Paz Department from the province of Corrientes
- The football team General Paz Juniors
