= Exaltación de la Cruz Partido =

Exaltación de la Cruz Partido de Exaltación de la Cruz
- Department
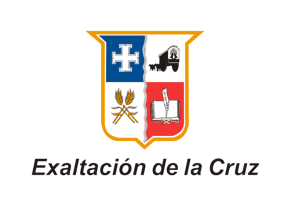
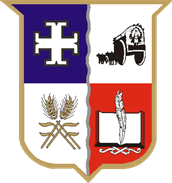
- Flag Coat of arms

- location of Exaltación de la Cruz Partido in Buenos Aires Province
- Coordinates: 36°19′S 57°40′W
- Country: Argentina
- Established: October 25, 1864
- Founder: provincial law 422
- Seat: Capilla del Señor

Government
  - Intendant: Diego Nanni (Union for the Homeland)

Area
  - Total: 662 km^{2} (256 sq mi)

Population
  - Total: 29,805
  - Density: 45.0/km^{2} (117/sq mi)
- Postal Code: B2763, B2764, B2812, B2814, B6703
- IFAM: BUE038
- Area Code: 02323, 02322
- Patron saint: Nuestra Señora. de los Dolores
- Website: www.exaltaciondelacruz.gov.ar

Exaltación de la Cruz Partido is a partido in the north-east part of Buenos Aires Province in Argentina.

The provincial subdivision has a population of 29,805 inhabitants in an area of 662 km^{2} (256 sq mi), and its capital city is Capilla del Señor, which is 80 km (50 mi) from Buenos Aires.

It is bounded by the Zárate, Campana, Pilar, San Antonio de Areco, San Andrés de Giles and Luján partidos.

== Population ==
The latest information obtained in the 2010 census points out that the partido has a population of 29,805 inhabitants.

- 1991 population : 17,072 inhabitants
- 2001 population : 24,167 inhabitants

== History ==
1527 — Don Sebastián Gaboto, discoverer of the lands that are now the Exaltación de la Cruz Partido, baptizes the Paraná de las Palmas river as such on Palm Sunday that year, due to the existence of many palm trees on its banks which were used in that celebration.

1536 — Don Pedro de Mendoza founds the city of Buenos Aires for the first time.

1580 — Don Juan de Garay, from Asunción of Paraguay, founds Buenos Aires for the second time to reaffirm the rights of the Spanish Crown against the Lusitanians' expansionist intentions. One of the measures used in implementing this territorial defense, on October 24 of this year, is the distribution of land and many small farms among 25 neighbors who had accompanied Garay in the final founding of Buenos Aires. The same year, near the second foundation of Buenos Aires, the fields of the partido are used to make up "Pago de la Cañada de la Cruz".

1614 — The Compañía de Jesús establishes itself on the lands of the present districts of Exaltación de la Cruz and Zárate, initiating livestock resource exploitation and control of goods from the north. In addition to a small farm, the Jesuits found a harbor and a school.

1730 — Don Francisco Casco de Mendoza, the first in his family to settle in these places, builds a chapel for private devotion in one of his fields along the Arroyo de la Cruz (Cross Creek). It was located in the present yard and parsonage.

1735 — On September 14, the day the Catholic Church celebrates the feast of the Exaltation of the Cross, the ecclesiastical authority raises the Casco de Mendoza's chapel to viceparish status, opening it up for public worship in 1750.

1750–1760 — The town of Capilla del Señor is established around the viceparish, fulfilling the Real Pragmatic of King Charles III which mandated that "all inhabitants rurally dispersed should be near a religious centre so their children can be educated in Christianity and in the first few letters".

1772 — Casco sells the land surrounding the church, where the town of Capilla del Señor, the capital of Exaltación de la Cruz Partido, exists today.

1784 — The Illustrious Cabildo "Justice and Regiment" orders the creation of Cañada de la Cruz Partido, the former name of this area. The boundaries of this district would become those of the Capilla del Señor Parish.

1785 — On January 1, the district's own ruler is designated. The designation falls on Don Francisco Remigio Casco de Mendoza, grandson of the owner of the original oratory.

1854 — Zárate gets autonomy.

1855 — Campana gets autonomy. As a result of the creation of these new partidos, Exaltación de la Cruz becomes an interior territory of Buenos Aires Province, no longer collecting taxes on merchandise entering via Zárate and Campana harbors.

== Localities of the partido ==
1. 1st Cuartel Capilla del Señor
2. 2nd Cuartel Los Cardales
3. 3rd Cuartel Pavón
4. 3rd Cuartel Arroyo de la Cruz
5. 3rd Cuartel Parada Orlando
6. 4th Cuartel Parada Robles
7. 4th Cuartel El Remanso - Parque Sakura
8. 4th Cuartel Etchegoyen
9. 5th Cuartel Parada La Lata - La Loma
10. 6th Cuartel Diego Gaynor
11. 7th Cuartel Gobernador Andonaegui
12. 7th Cuartel Chenaut
