= Parada Robles =

- Town
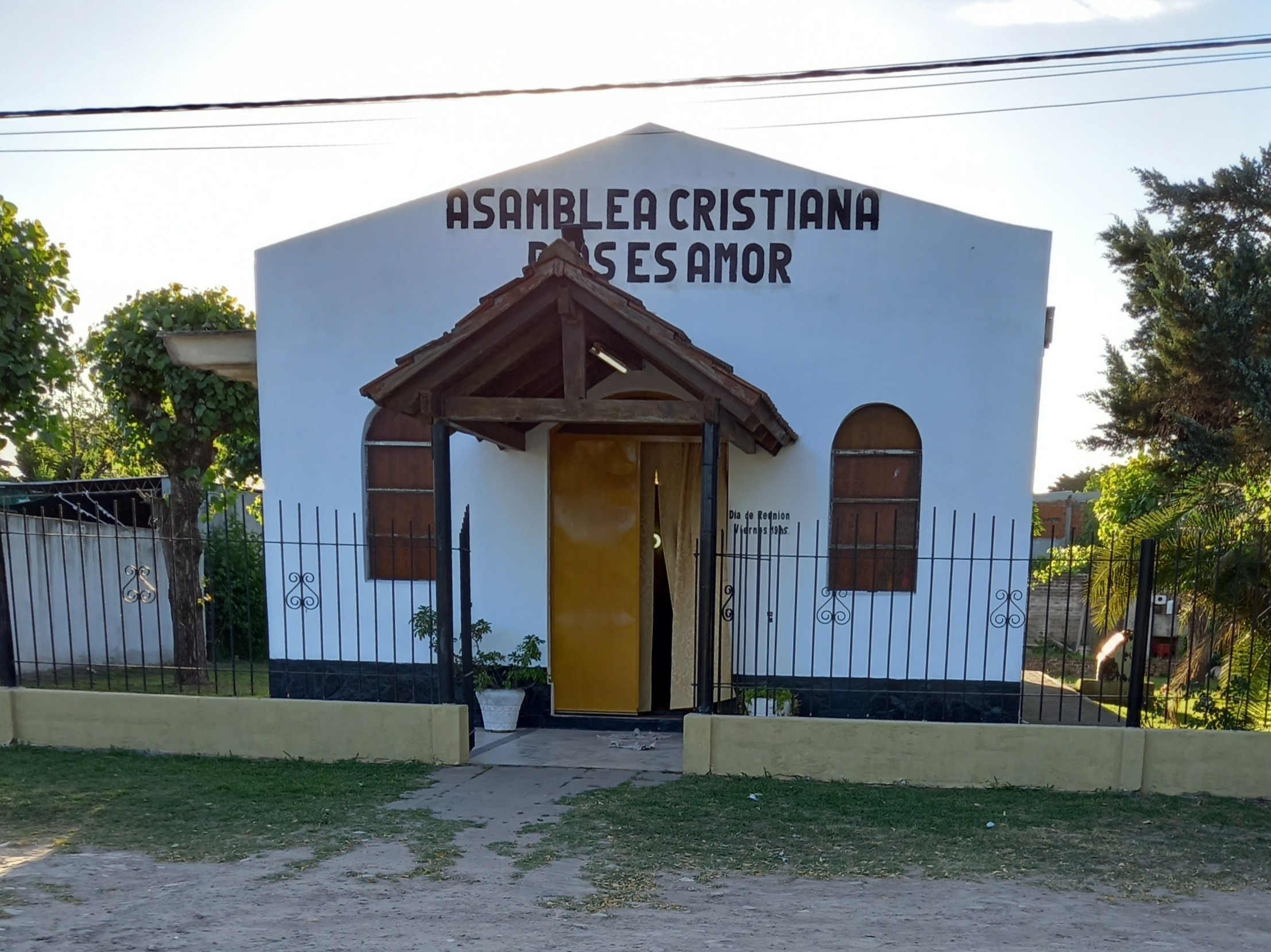
- Church in the town

- Location within Buenos Aires Province
- Coordinates: 34°22′34″S 59°07′23″W
- Country: Argentina
- Province: Buenos Aires
- Partidos: Exaltación de la Cruz
- Established: 1940
- Elevation: 27 m (89 ft)

Population (2001 Census)
  - Total: 4,761
- Time zone: UTC−3 (ART)
- CPA Base: B 6753
- Climate: Dfc

Parada Robles is a town located in the southern edge of the Exaltación de la Cruz Partido in the province of Buenos Aires, Argentina.

== History ==
Parada Robles was founded in 1940.

== Population ==
According to INDEC, which collects population data for the country, the town had a population of 4,761 people as of the 2001 census.
