= Azcuénaga, Buenos Aires =

Azcuénaga
- Town
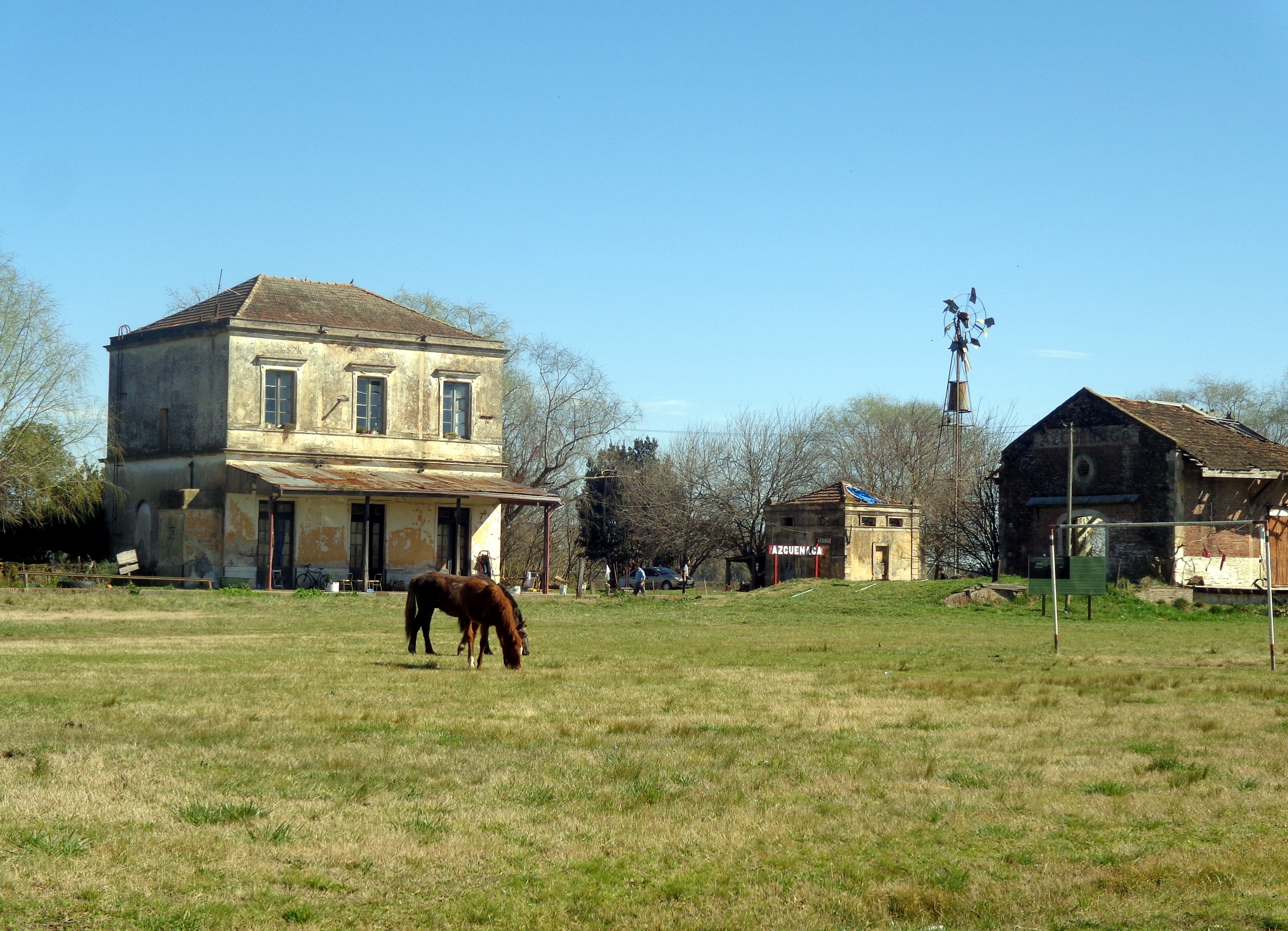

- Location within Buenos Aires Province
- Coordinates: 34°21′54″S 59°22′27″W
- Country: Argentina
- Province: Buenos Aires
- Partidos: San Andres de Giles
- Established: April 1, 1880
- Elevation: 39 m (128 ft)

Population (2001 Census)
  - Total: 357
- Time zone: UTC−3 (ART)
- CPA Base: B 6721
- Climate: Dfc

Azcuénaga is a town located in the San Andres de Giles Partido in the province of Buenos Aires, Argentina.

== History ==
Azcuénaga was founded on April 1, 1880 after the construction of a railway station in the area. The town was named after Miguel de Azcuénaga, an Argentine general. Azcuénaga became a military center during the Revolution of 1880. The town was settled by significant numbers of Spanish, Italian and French origin. Passenger rail service to the town ended in 1978.

== Population ==
According to INDEC, which collects population data for the country, the town had a population of 827 people as of the 2001 census.
