= Solis =

Solis is a Spanish name derived from the Latin sol, literally meaning sun.

Solis, Solís, de Solís, or de Solis may refer to:

- Solis (film), a 2018 film directed by Carl Strathie
- Solís, a fictional country in the 2018 video game Just Cause 4
- Synoptic Optical Long-term Investigations of the Sun, a solar telescope

== People ==
- Alonso Solís (born 1978), Costa Rican footballer
- Alonso de Solís, Spanish explorer and governor of Florida in 1576
- Antonio de Solís y Ribadeneyra (1610–1686), Spanish dramatist and historian
- Daniel Solis, U.S. politician, Chicago alderman (25th Ward), 1996–2019
- Fermín Solís, Spanish cartoonist
- Fulgencio García de Solís, acting Governor of Florida from 1752 to 1755, and Governor of Honduras from 1757 to 1759
- Gerardo Octavio Solís Gómez, Mexican politician, member of the National Action Party who has served as substitute Governor of Jalisco.
- Guillermo Scholz Solis (born 1947), Chilean chess master
- Hilda Solis, U.S. Secretary of Labor (2009-2013), former Congresswoman for the 32nd District of California (D)
- Javier Solís (1931-1966), Mexican singer
- Jeanne Cady Solis (1867-1947), American neurologist
- Juan Díaz de Solís, Spanish navigator and explorer
- Jose Solis, Filipino politician
- Magdalena Solís, Mexican serial killer
- Marco Antonio Solís (born 1959), Mexican musician, singer, composer, and record producer
- Mauricio Solís, Costa Rican footballer
- Merced Solis, better known as Tito Santana (born 1953), American professional wrestler
- Odlanier Solís, Cuban professional boxer
- Oscar Solis, Filipino-American prelate of the Roman Catholic Church, bishop of Salt Lake City
- Ottón Solís, Costa Rican politician and former presidential candidate
- Patti Solis Doyle, American political operative in the 2008 Clinton and Obama campaigns
- Virgil Solis, 16th century German draughtsman and printmaker in engraving, etching and wood

== Fictional characters ==
- Elio Solis, a fictional character from the 2025 Disney movie Elio
- Gabrielle Solis, a fictional character on the American TV drama Desperate Housewives
- Solis (comics), a fictional character from DC Comics

== Places ==
- Solís, Buenos Aires, a town in Argentina

== See also ==
- Soliz, a surname
