= Arribeños =

- Town
- Location within Buenos Aires Province
- Coordinates: 34°13′S 61°22′W
- Country: Argentina
- Province: Buenos Aires
- Partidos: General Arenales
- Established: November 13, 1904
- Elevation: 72 m (236 ft)

Population (2001 Census)
  - Total: 2,794
- Time zone: UTC−3 (ART)
- CPA Base: B 6007
- Climate: Dfc

Arribeños is a town located in the General Arenales Partido in the province of Buenos Aires, Argentina.

== Name ==
Arribeños was named after an infantry regiment which fought against the British in the early 19th century.

== History ==
The land now making up Arribeños was formerly owned by two different companies, the Kenny Company and, later, the Stroeder Company. Rail service began in the area in 1902 under what is now the Ferrocarril General San Martin, and a town began to develop around it. Arribeños is considered to have been founded on November 13, 1904. Rail service ended in the 1990s.

In recent years, the water and sewage system in the town has been modernized through a government project.

== Population ==
According to INDEC, which collects population data for the country, the town had a population of 2,794 people as of the 2001 census.
