= Villanueva, Buenos Aires =

Villanueva
- Town
- Location within Buenos Aires Province
- Coordinates: 35°40′S 58°26′W
- Country: Argentina
- Province: Buenos Aires
- Partidos: General Paz
- Established: 1903
- Elevation: 19 m (62 ft)

Population (2001 Census)
  - Total: 572
- Time zone: UTC−3 (ART)
- CPA Base: B 7225
- Climate: Dfc

Villanueva is a town located in the General Paz Partido in the province of Buenos Aires, Argentina.

== Geography ==
Villanueva is located around 150 km (93 mi) from the city of Buenos Aires. It is located along the Salado River, where a spa is present in the town.

== History ==
In 2015, the town suffered a severe flood as a result of the overflowing of the Salado River. Provincial Route 29, which connected the town to the outside world, was cut off by water, leaving residents stranded in the town with the exception of trucks able to bring supplies. The Argentine government declared the region an emergency zone in response to the flooding.

== Population ==
According to INDEC, which collects population data for the country, the town had a population of 572 people as of the 2001 census.
