= South American Energy Council =

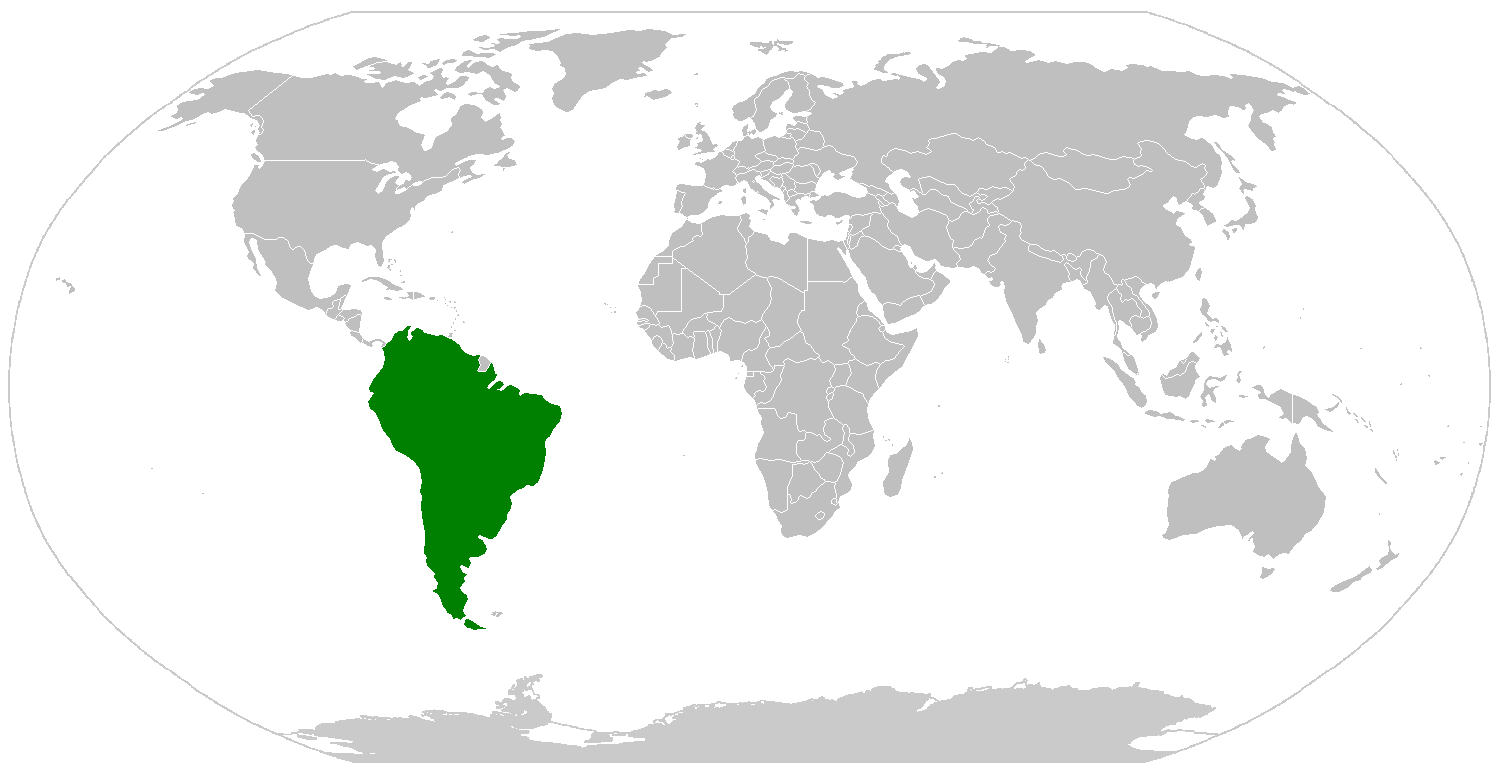
Union of South American Nations

The South American Energy Council is a body set up to co-ordinate the regional energy policy of the Union of South American Nations (UNASUR).

== History ==
Its establishment was agreed at the first South American Energy Summit, which took place on April 16–17 2007 on Isla Margarita in the Venezuelan state of Nueva Esparta. It was officially created in May 2010 during the UNASUR's Extraordinary Summit in Los Cardales, Argentina.

In 2012, the Council started to draft a South American Energy Treaty. Before drafting this treaty, the Council coordinated the creation of an energy balance and a 15-point strategy.

== See also ==
- South American Organization of Gas Producers and Exporters
