= Daireaux Partido =

Daireaux Partido de Daireaux
- Department
- Coat of arms

- location of Daireaux Partido in Buenos Aires Province
- Coordinates: 36.60°S 60.75°W
- Country: Argentina
- Established: June 5, 1910
- Founder: Pablo Guglieri
- Seat: Daireaux

Government
  - Intendant: Esteban Alejandro Acerbo (Homeland Force)

Area
  - Total: 3,820 km^{2} (1,470 sq mi)

Population
  - Total: 15,857
  - Density: 4.15/km^{2} (10.8/sq mi)
- Demonym: deroense
- Postal Code: B6555
- IFAM: BUE033
- Area Code: 02316
- Website: www.deroweb.com.ar

Daireaux Partido is a partido in the central west of Buenos Aires Province in Argentina.

The provincial subdivision has a population of about 16,000 inhabitants in an area of 3,820 km^{2} (1,475 sq mi), and its capital city is Daireaux, 410 km (255 mi) from Buenos Aires.

== Settlements ==
- Andant
- Arboledas
- Daireaux
- Enrique Lavalle
- Freyre
- La Copeta
- La Larga
- La Manuela
- Mouras
- Salazar
