= Salliqueló =

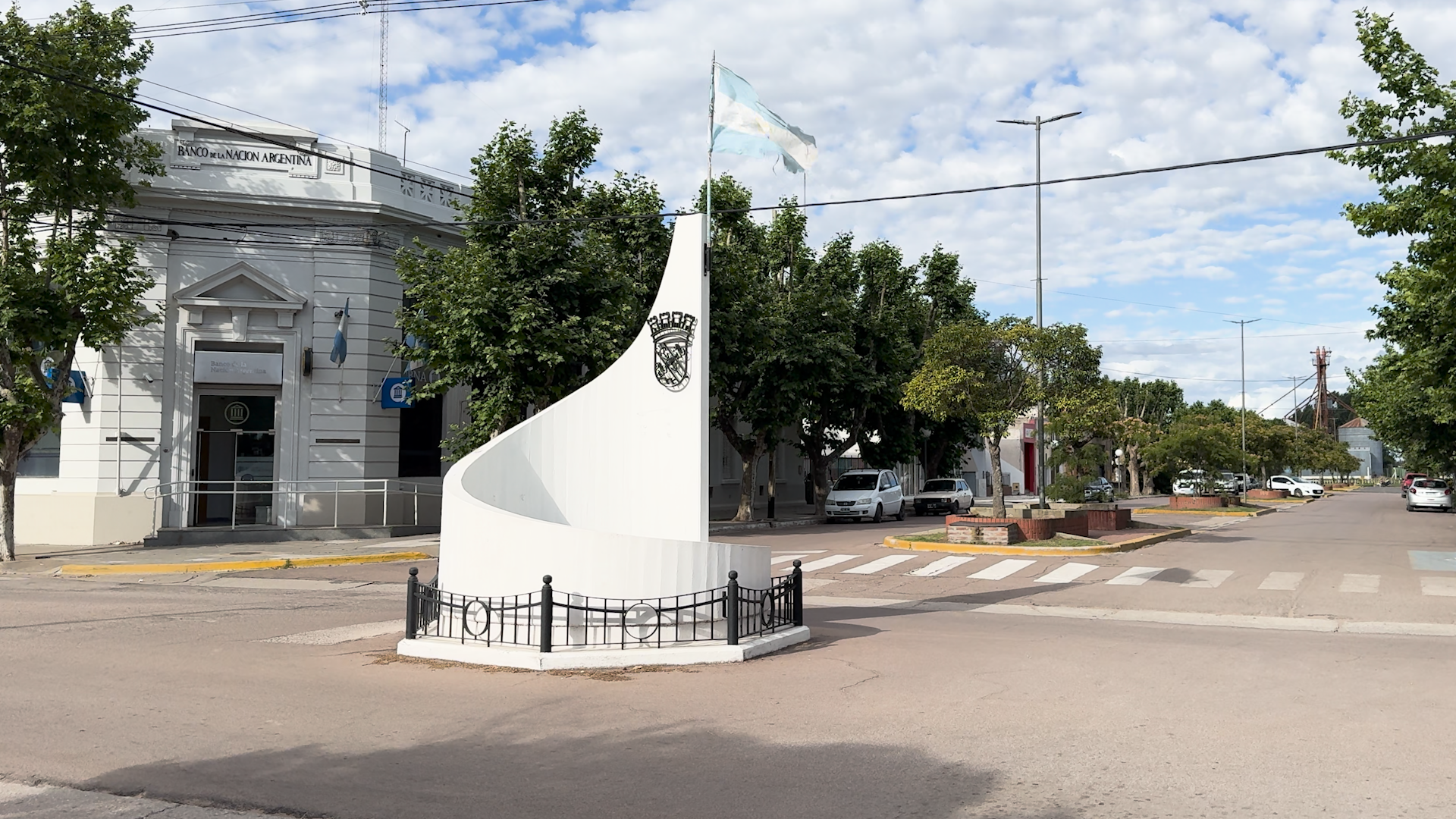

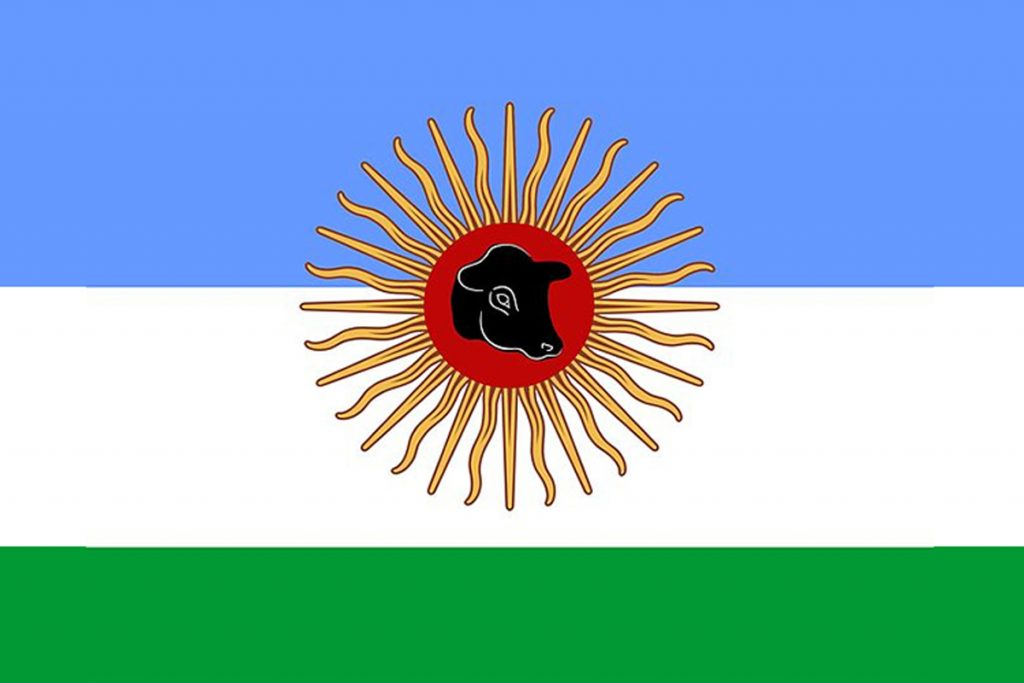
- Flag Coat of arms

- Location in Argentina
- Coordinates: 36°45′S 62°55′W
- Country: Argentina
- Province: Buenos Aires
- Partido: Salliqueló
- Founded: 3 June 1903
- Elevation: 120 m (390 ft)

Population (2001 census [INDEC])
  - Total: 7,522
- CPA Base: B 6339
- Area code: +54 2394

Salliqueló is a town in Buenos Aires Province, Argentina. It is the administrative headquarters for Salliqueló Partido.
