= Colón, Buenos Aires =

City in Buenos Aires Province, Argentina

Colón
- City
- Location in Argentina
- Coordinates: 33°53′S 61°06′W
- Country: Argentina
- Province: Buenos Aires
- Partido: Colón
- Founded: 1892
- Elevation: 82 m (269 ft)

Population (2001 census [INDEC])
  - Total: 23,171
- CPA Base: B 2720
- Area code: +54 2473

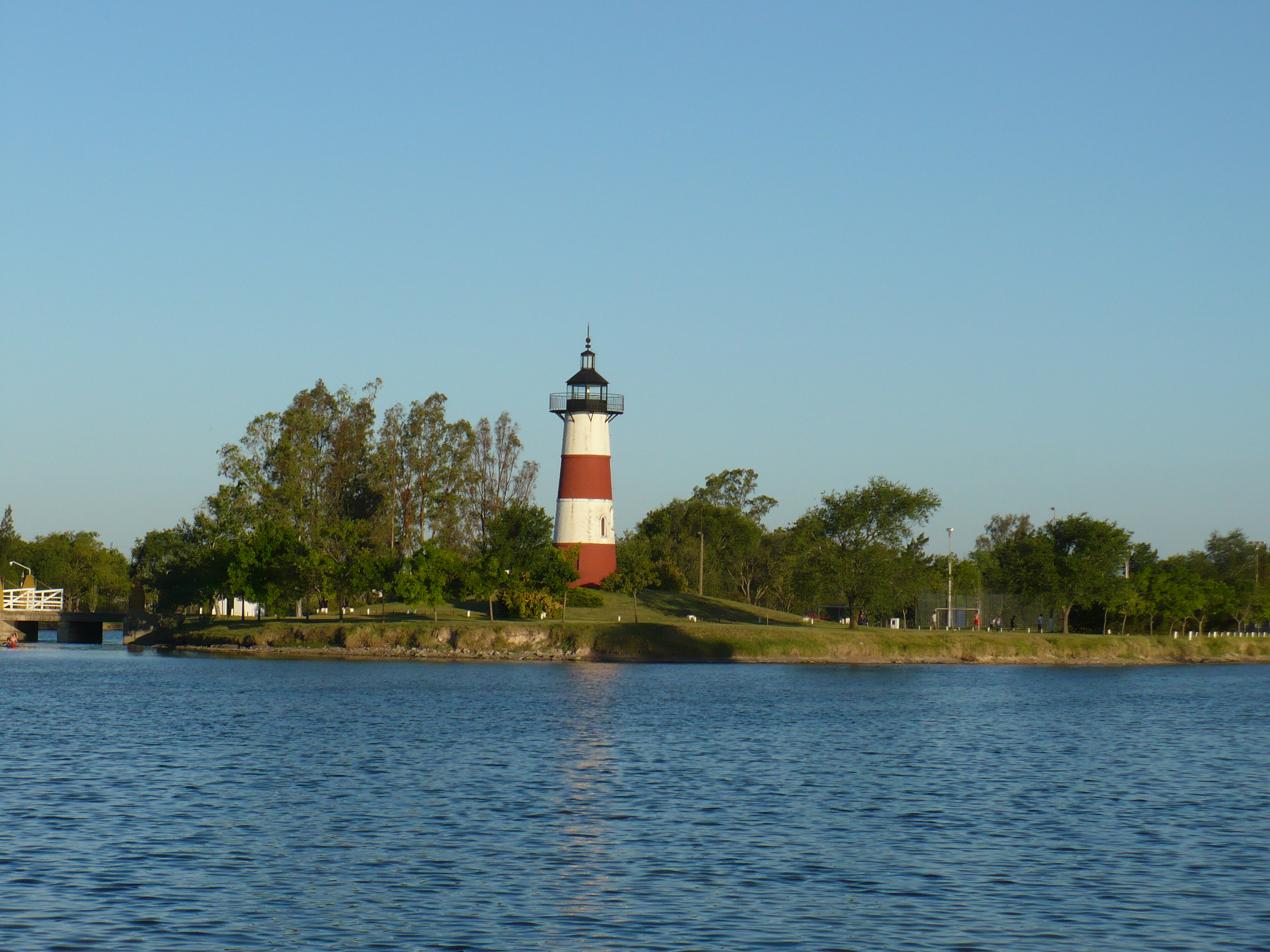
A lighthouse on an island in the town's Municipal Lake Complex.

Colón is a small city in Buenos Aires Province, Argentina. It is the administrative centre for Colón Partido.

The town is located in an agricultural area, the main areas of employment are in agriculture, the production of agricultural machinery and textiles.

The local museum is housed at the former Ferrocarril General Bartolomé Mitre railway station and has a display of old photographs and artifacts.
