= South American Energy Summit =

Union of South American Nations meeting

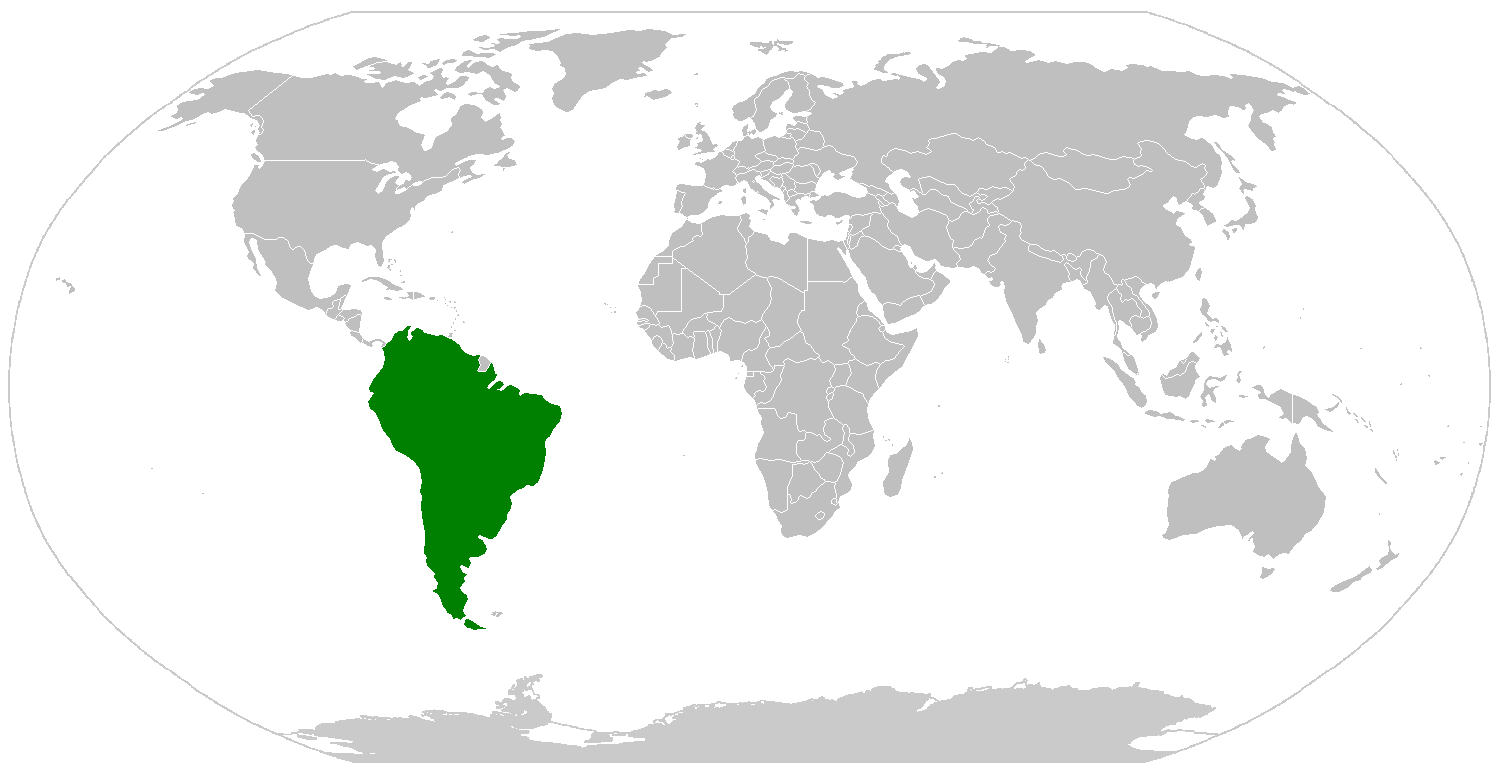
Union of South American Nations

The South American Energy Summit is the name for one of a sequence of summits bringing together delegations from the countries of the Union of South American Nations to discuss energy related issues.

== First South American Energy Summit ==
The first South American Energy Summit took place on April 16–17 2007, on Isla Margarita, in the Venezuelan state of Nueva Esparta. Among the issues discussed was the production of ethanol fuel in the region, over which the countries have differing views. It was agreed that a new South American Energy Council, headed by the energy ministers of the 12 countries, would be created to co-ordinate energy policy, while the prospect of a future South American Energy Treaty was also raised.

On non-energy topics, the presidents also agreed that the South American Community of Nations should be renamed the Union of South American Nations.

== See also ==
- South American Organization of Gas Producers and Exporters
