= Suipacha =

- Location in Argentina
- Coordinates: 34°46′S 59°41′W
- Country: Argentina
- Province: Buenos Aires
- Partido: Suipacha
- Elevation: 44 m (144 ft)

Population (2001 census [INDEC])
  - Total: 7,149
- CPA Base: B 6612
- Area code: +54 2324

Suipacha is a town in Buenos Aires Province, Argentina. It is the administrative centre for Suipacha Partido. Both are named after the first battle won by patriot forces in the Independence War from Spain. The battle took place near the present day location of the city of Tupiza, Bolivia.
