= Ranchos, Buenos Aires =

Ranchos
- Location in Argentina
- Coordinates: 35°30′59″S 58°19′8″W
- Country: Argentina
- Province: Buenos Aires
- Partido: General Paz
- Founded: January 15, 1781
- Elevation: 18 m (59 ft)

Population (2001 census [INDEC])
  - Total: 7,333
- CPA Base: B 1987
- Area code: +54 2241

Ranchos is a town in Buenos Aires Province, Argentina. It is the administrative centre for General Paz Partido.

The settlement was established on January 15, 1871 by provincial law number 422.

== Attractions ==
- The town lies near "Laguna Ranchos" lake, which features three islands and a range of flora and fauna.
- Replica Fort, in 1967 a replica of the original fort built in 1781.
- Ranchos Historical Museum.
- Festival de Fortines, a festival that takes place on the central island of Lake Ranchos.
- Church of Nuestra Señora del Pilar, built in 1863.
