= Salliqueló Partido =

Salliqueló Partido de Salliqueló
- Department
- Coat of arms

- location of Salliqueló Partido in Buenos Aires Province
- Coordinates: 36°45′S 62°50′W
- Country: Argentina
- Established: November 13, 1961
- Founder: provincial law
- Seat: Salliqueló

Government
  - Intendant: Ariel Succurro (PJ)

Area
  - Total: 800 km^{2} (310 sq mi)

Population
  - Total: 8,682
  - Density: 11/km^{2} (28/sq mi)
- Demonym: salliquelense
- Postal Code: B6339
- IFAM: BUE109
- Area Code: 02394
- Website: www.salliquelo.gov.ar

Salliqueló Partido is a partido of Buenos Aires Province in Argentina.

The provincial subdivision has a population of about 9,000 inhabitants in an area of 800 km^{2} (309 sq mi) and its capital city is Salliqueló, 568 km (353 mi) from Buenos Aires.

== Settlements ==
- Estación Graciarena
- Quenumá
- Salliqueló
