= Tapalqué Partido =

Tapalqué Partido de Tapalqué
- Department
- location of Tapalqué Partido in Buenos Aires Province
- Coordinates: 38°06′S 62°13′W
- Country: Argentina
- Established: July 19, 1865
- Founder: provincial law
- Seat: Tapalqué

Government
  - Intendant: Gustavo Cocconi (P.J.)

Area
  - Total: 4,149 km^{2} (1,602 sq mi)

Population
  - Total: 8,296
  - Density: 2.000/km^{2} (5.179/sq mi)
- Demonym: tapalquense
- Postal Code: B7303
- IFAM: BUE122
- Area Code: 02283
- Patron saint: Archangel Gabriel
- Website: municipiodetapalque.gob.ar

Tapalqué Partido is a central partido of Buenos Aires Province in Argentina.

The provincial subdivision has a population of about 8,000 inhabitants in an area of 4,149 km^{2} (1,602 sq mi), and its capital city is Tapalqué, which is around 273 km (170 mi) from Buenos Aires.

== Settlements ==
- Tapalqué
- Crotto
- Velloso
