= Tres Lomas =

- Location in Argentina
- Coordinates: 36°27′S 62°51′W
- Country: Argentina
- Province: Buenos Aires
- Partido: Tres Lomas
- Founded: 1906
- Elevation: 112 m (367 ft)

Population (2001 census [INDEC])
  - Total: 6,685
- CPA Base: B 6409
- Area code: +54 2392

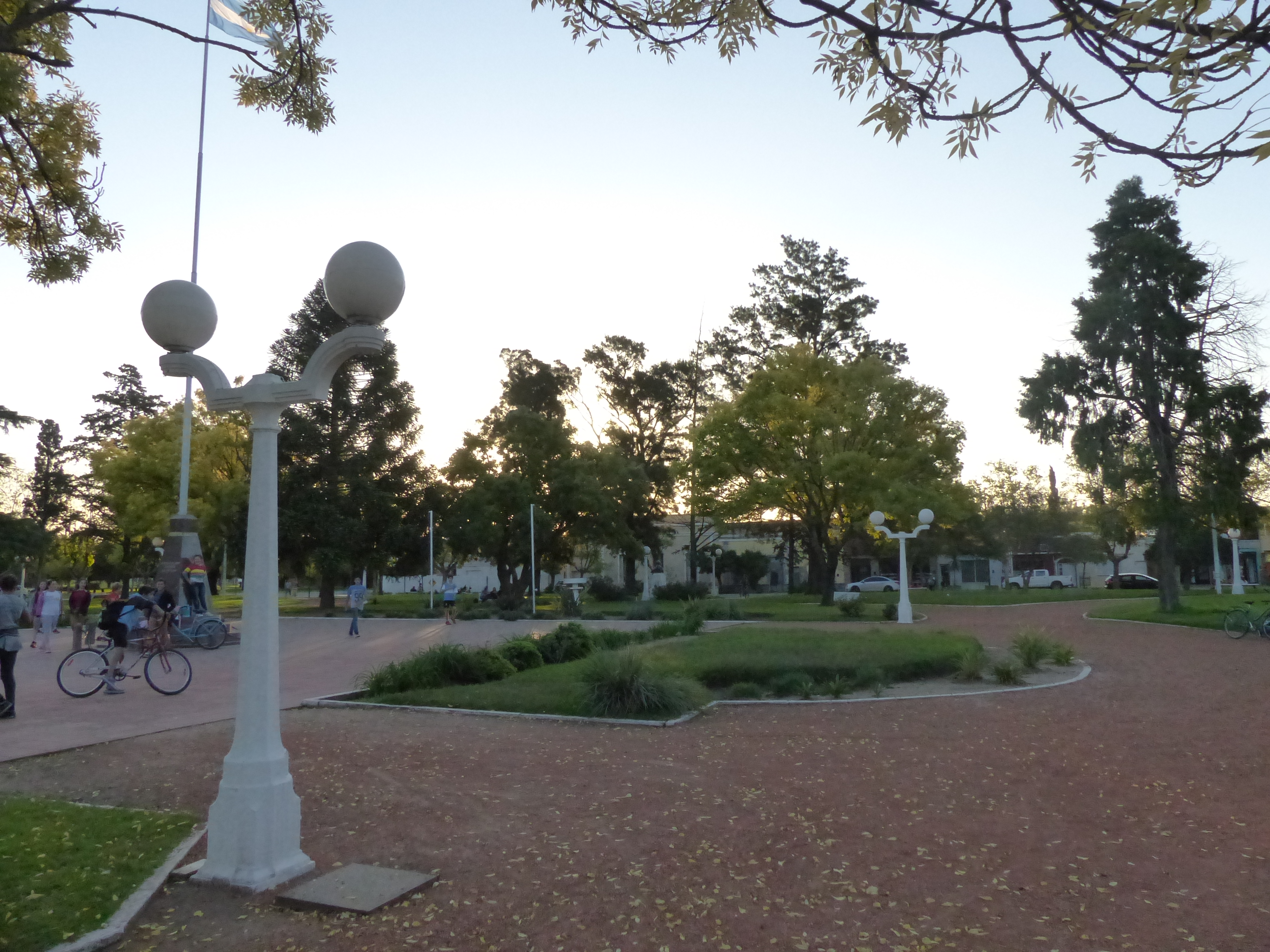
Leandro N Alem Square in Tres Lomas

Tres Lomas is a town in Buenos Aires Province, Argentina. It is the head town of the Tres Lomas Partido.
