= Guernica, Argentina =

- Location in Greater Buenos Aires
- Coordinates: 34°55′S 58°23′W
- Country: Argentina
- Province: Buenos Aires
- Partido: Presidente Perón
- Founded: November 25, 1993
- Elevation: 25 m (82 ft)

Population (2001 census [INDEC])
  - Total: 52,529
- CPA Base: B 1862
- Area code: +54 2224

Guernica is a localidad in Presidente Perón Partido of Buenos Aires Province, Argentina. It is the administrative centre for the partido. Guernica is situated on the outskirts of the Greater Buenos Aires urban conurbation around 30 km from the autonomous city of Buenos Aires.

Guernica has a theatre called "Anfiteatro Municipal Homero Manzi", named after Homero Manzi.
