= Colón Partido =

Department in Argentina

Colón Partido de Colón
- Department
- location of in Buenos Aires Province
- Coordinates: 33.8973°S 61.0994°W
- Country: Argentina
- Established: October 31, 1892
- Founder: provincial law 2474
- Seat: Colón

Government
  - Intendant: Waldemar Giordano (PJ)

Area
  - Total: 1,022 km^{2} (395 sq mi)

Population
  - Total: 23,179
  - Density: 22.68/km^{2} (58.74/sq mi)
- Demonym: colonense
- Postal Code: B2720
- IFAM: BUE027
- Area Code: 02473
- Website: http://www.colonbaires.com.ar/

Colón Partido is a partido on the northern border of Buenos Aires Province in Argentina.

The provincial subdivision has a population of about 23,000 inhabitants in an area of 1,022 km^{2} (395 sq mi), and its capital city is Colón, which is around 260 km (160 mi) from Buenos Aires.

== Settlements ==
- Colón
- Pearson
- Sarasa
- Villa Manuel Pomar
