= Piła (disambiguation) =

Piła is a city in Greater Poland Voivodeship, west Poland, known as Schneidemühl from 1772 to 1945 while under Prussian or German rule.

Piła may also refer to the following places in Poland:

- Piła, Kuyavian-Pomeranian Voivodeship (north-central Poland)
- Piła, Łódź Voivodeship (central Poland)
- Piła, Jędrzejów County in Świętokrzyskie Voivodeship (south-central Poland)
- Piła, Końskie County in Świętokrzyskie Voivodeship (south-central Poland)
- Piła, Subcarpathian Voivodeship (south-east Poland)
- Piła, Gmina Sośnie, Ostrów County in Greater Poland Voivodeship (west-central Poland)
- Piła, Pleszew County in Greater Poland Voivodeship (west-central Poland)
- Piła, Szamotuły County in Greater Poland Voivodeship (west-central Poland)
- Piła, Pomeranian Voivodeship (north Poland)

== See also ==
- Pila (disambiguation)
