= Presidente Perón Partido =

Presidente Perón Partido de Presidente Perón
- Department
- location of Presidente Perón Partido in Gran Buenos Aires
- Coordinates: 34°28′S 58°55′W
- Country: Argentina
- Established: November 25, 1993
- Founder: provincial law
- Seat: Guernica

Government
  - Intendant: Blanca Cantero (FR)

Area
  - Total: 120.73 km^{2} (46.61 sq mi)

Population
  - Total: 60,191
  - Density: 498.56/km^{2} (1,291.3/sq mi)
- Demonym: peronense
- Postal Code: B1862
- IFAM: BUE098
- Area Code: 02224
- Patron saint: ?
- Website: www.peron.mun.gba.gov.ar

Presidente Perón Partido is a partido located in the Greater Buenos Aires urban area in Buenos Aires Province, Argentina.

The provincial subdivision has a population of about 60,000 inhabitants in an area of 120.73 km^{2} (46.61 sq mi), and its capital city is Guernica, which is located around 38 km (24 mi) from Buenos Aires. The partido is mostly rural and has an increasing affluence with the construction of new gated communities and golf clubs in the area.

== Name ==
The partido is named in honour of Juan Domingo Perón (1895-1974), who served as President of Argentina, he served two terms between 1946 and 1955, but he was removed from office by a military coup. He served a third term between 1973 and 1974 but died in office.

== Districts ==
- Guernica (capital)
- América Unida
- Villa Numancia
