= Solís, Buenos Aires =

Solís
- Town
- Location within Buenos Aires Province
- Coordinates: 34°18′S 59°20′W
- Country: Argentina
- Province: Buenos Aires
- Partidos: San Andres de Giles
- Elevation: 37 m (121 ft)

Population (2001 Census)
  - Total: 862
- Time zone: UTC−3 (ART)
- CPA Base: B 2764
- Climate: Dfc

Solís is a town located in the northeastern edge of the San Andres de Giles Partido in the province of Buenos Aires, Argentina.

== History ==
Solís was founded on July 16, 1894, upon the construction of a rail station of the same name by the Ferrocarril Central Argentino, a rail company. Solís would eventually be founded as a company town. The date of the town's founding is celebrated yearly in its central town square.

== Population ==
According to INDEC, which collects population data for the country, the town had a population of 862 people as of the 2001 census.
