= Tres Lomas Partido =

Tres Lomas Partido de Tres Lomas
- Department
- location of Tres Lomas Partido in Buenos Aires Province
- Coordinates: 36°27′32″S 62°51′41″W
- Country: Argentina
- Established: July 20, 1907
- Founder: ?
- Seat: Tres Lomas

Government
  - Intendant: Luciano Spinolo Sayago (Radical Civic Union)

Area
  - Total: 1,253 km^{2} (484 sq mi)

Population
  - Total: 7,439
  - Density: 5.937/km^{2} (15.38/sq mi)
- Demonym: ?
- Postal Code: B6409
- IFAM: BUE129
- Area Code: 02394
- Website: treslomas.gob.ar

Tres Lomas Partido is a western partido of Buenos Aires Province in Argentina.

The provincial subdivision has a population of about 7,500 inhabitants in an area of 1,253 km^{2} (484 sq mi), and its capital city is Tres Lomas, which is around 520 km (320 mi) from Buenos Aires.

== Settlements ==
- Tres Lomas
- Ingeniero Thompson

== Economy ==
The economy of Tres Lomas is dominated by agriculture, the main crops are Sunflower, wheat and maize. There are around 150,000 head of cattle in the district and there are a number of dairy farms producing around 70,000 litres of milk per day.
