= Tapalqué =

- Location in Argentina
- Coordinates: 36°21′S 60°01′W
- Country: Argentina
- Province: Buenos Aires
- Partido: Tapalqué
- Founded: 7 November 1863
- Elevation: 95 m (312 ft)

Population (2001 census [INDEC])
  - Total: 6,605
- CPA Base: B 7303
- Area code: +54 2283

Tapalqué is a town in the central region of Buenos Aires Province, Argentina. It is the administrative headquarters for Tapalqué Partido.

== Etymology ==
The name "Tapalqué" is a name derived from the nearby Tapalquén stream, which means "water with reeds" in the Mapudungun language.

== See also ==
- Tapalqué Partido
