= Píla =

Píla may refer to:

- Píla, Pezinok District, Slovakia
- Píla, Lučenec District, Slovakia
- Píla, Žarnovica District, Slovakia

== See also ==
- Pila (disambiguation)
