= Soliz =

Soliz or Solíz is a surname. Notable people with the surname include:

- Hermán Solíz (born 1982), Bolivian football defender
- Jacqueline Solíz (born 1964), Bolivian sprinter
- Nelvin Solíz (born 1989), Bolivian football midfielder
- Óscar Soliz (born 1985), Bolivian road racing cyclist
- Steve Soliz (born 1971), American baseball player and coach

== See also ==
- Solis (disambiguation)
- Soliz-Baca House
