= Campana, Buenos Aires =

City in Buenos Aires Province, Argentina

Campana
- City and Port
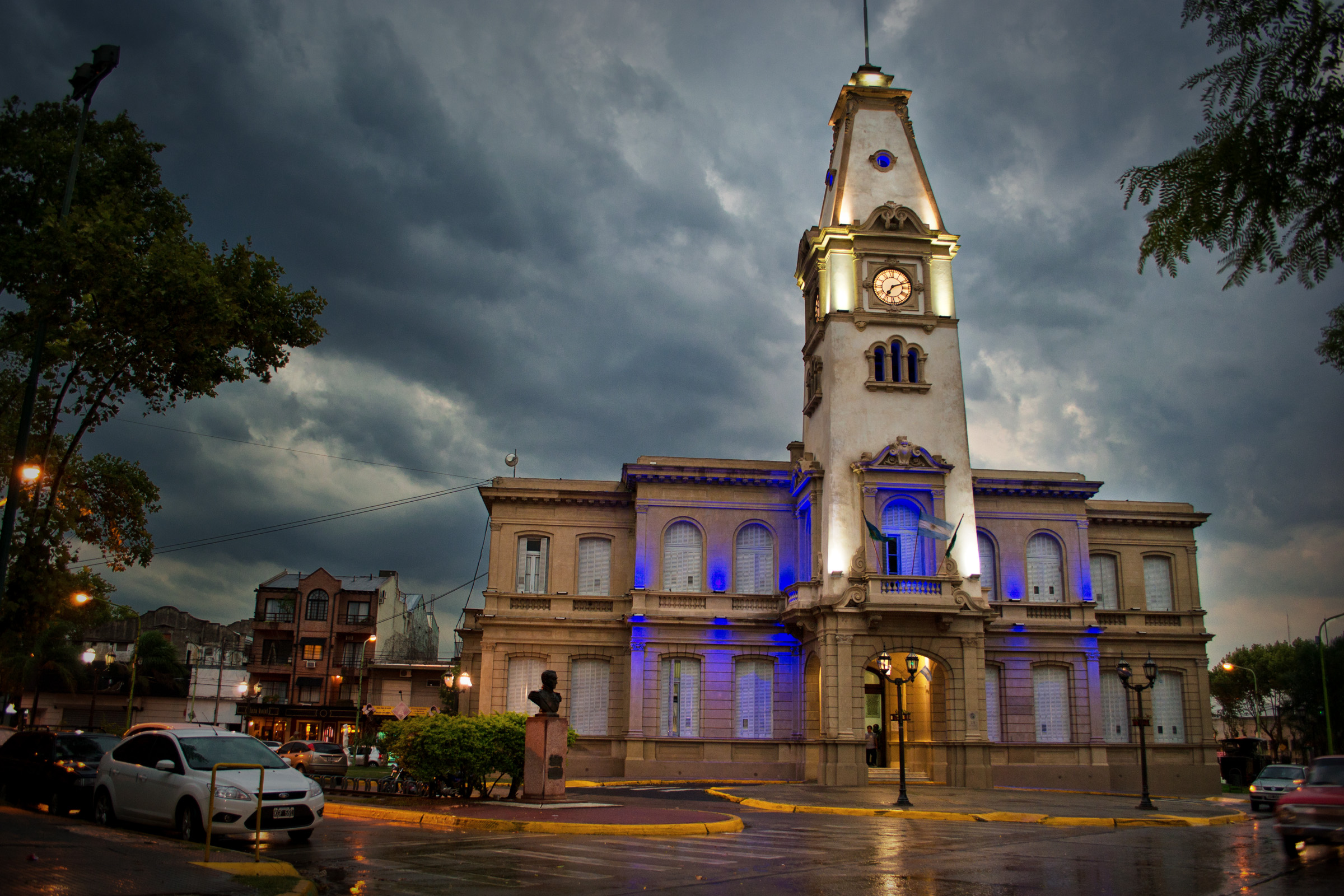
- City Hall, Campana

- Coat of arms
- Nickname: Mánchester argentina (Argentine Manchester)
- Location in Buenos Aires Province
- Coordinates: 34°10′S 58°55′W
- Country: Argentina
- Province: Buenos Aires
- Partido: Campana
- Founded: July 6, 1885
- Elevation: 20 m (66 ft)

Population (2010 census [INDEC])
  - Total: 94,333
- CPA Base: B 2804
- Area code: +54 3489
- Climate: Cfa

Campana is a city in the province of Buenos Aires, Argentina. It is the seat of the Campana Partido. It is located about 75 km (47 mi) from the Autonomous City of Buenos Aires, on the right-hand margin of the Paraná River. Its population is 94,333 inhabitants as per the 2010 census [INDEC].

Campana and Zárate make up an important industrial region. The city is linked to Zárate and the Zárate-Brazo Largo Bridge (and from there to Mesopotamia) by Provincial Route 6. The Pan-American Highway (Route 9) links Campana to Buenos Aires, Rosario, Córdoba and the north of Argentina.

== History ==
The village of Campana was officially created in 1875. It was on July 6, 1885 that Campana Partido was created as an offshoot of the Exaltación de la Cruz Partido.

Prior the arrival of the railways, Campana had begun to grow as a trading port for the meat packing industries. The Buenos Aires to Rosario railway, running through Campana, opened on 1 February 1876. This was the start of a huge influx of immigrants to work in new industries there. These included meat packing, milling, and a distillery.

Campana has been since late 19th century and to a lesser degree today an important shipyard and port for passengers traveling to the remote Ibicuy Islands of the Paraná Delta.

Japanese automobile manufacturer Honda opened a factory in 2011, where it has built the Honda City and Honda HR-V.

== Demographics ==
Campana has a total of 94,333 inhabitants (INDEC, 2010).

=== Population origins ===
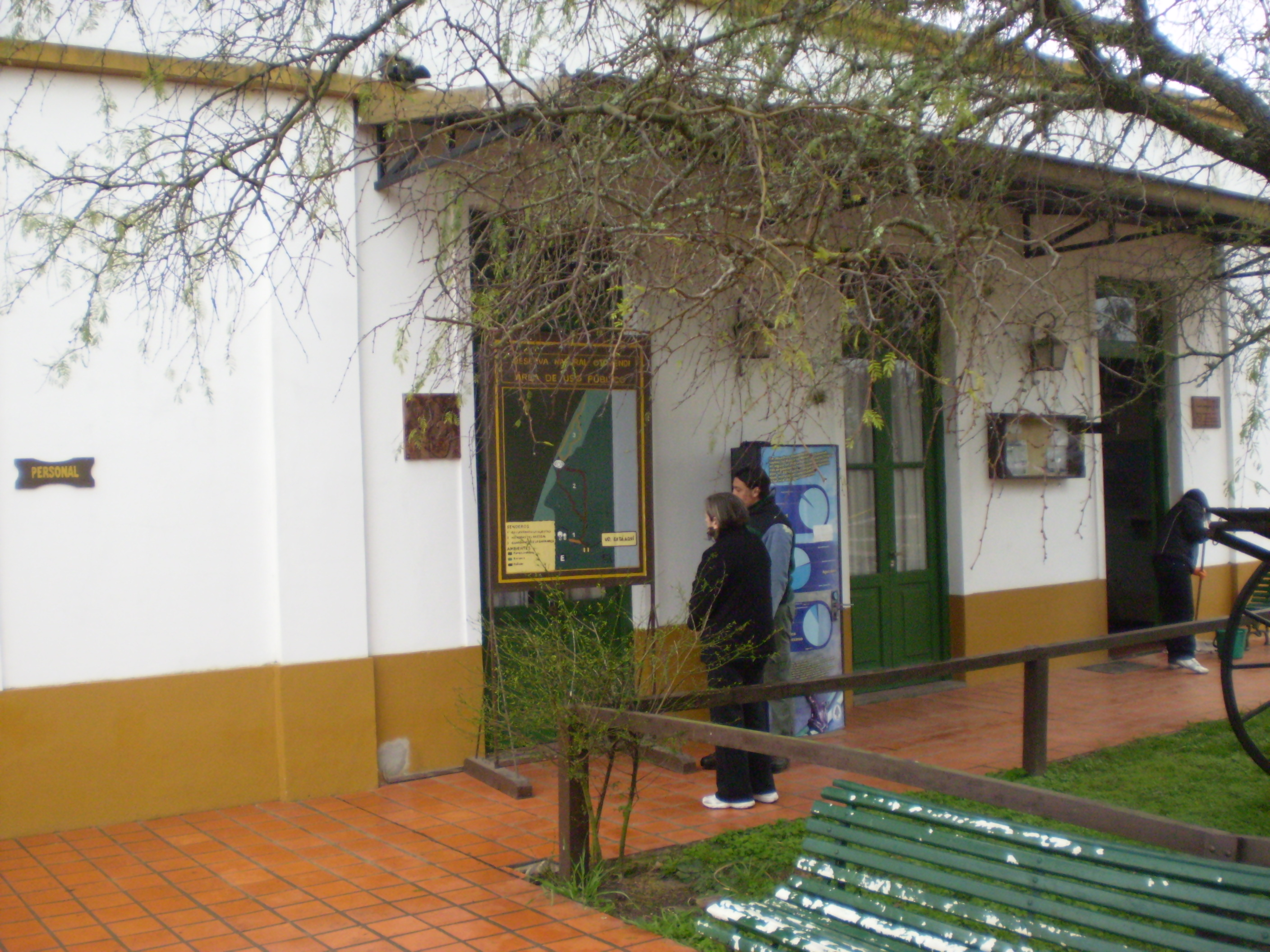
Welcome Centre at the Otamendi Natural Reserve, outside Campana.

The city's population consists mostly of Italian and Spanish (mostly Galicians) immigrants, although there are other minorities such as Germans, British, French and Romani. In recent years there has been a slight increase in population from East Asia (China and South Korea) and Latin American countries like Bolivia, Paraguay and Peru.

== Sports ==
Campana is home to Club Villa Dálmine, a football club that plays in Argentina's regionalised 2nd division, and to Puerto Nuevo, an older club that plays in 5th division.
