= General Arenales Partido =

General Arenales Partido de General Arenales
- Department
- location of General Arenales Partido in Buenos Aires Province
- Coordinates: 34°18′S 61°18′W
- Country: Argentina
- Established: 6 September 1889
- Named for: Juan Antonio Álvarez de Arenales
- Seat: General Arenales

Government
  - Intendant: Erica Silvana Revilla (UCR)

Area
  - Total: 1,522 km^{2} (588 sq mi)

Population
  - Total: 14,876
  - Density: 9.774/km^{2} (25.31/sq mi)
- Demonym: arenalense
- Postal Code: B6005
- IFAM: BUE044
- Area Code: 02353
- Website: generalarenales.gob.ar

General Arenales Partido is a partido on the northern border of Buenos Aires Province in Argentina.

The provincial subdivision has a population of about 15,000 inhabitants in an area of 1,522 km^{2} (588 sq mi), and its capital city is General Arenales, which is located 320 km (199 mi) from Buenos Aires.

== Economy ==
The economy of General Arenales Partido is dominated by agriculture. The main products are arable crops, beef, pork, honey and dairy products.

There are also small scale metal and textile industries as well as numerous small businesses.

== Settlements ==
- General Arenales
- Arribeños
- Ascensión
- Delgado
- Ferré
- Ham
- La Angelita
- La Pinta
- La Trinidad
