= General Arenales, Buenos Aires =

General Arenales
- Location in Argentina
- Coordinates: 34°17′S 61°17′W
- Country: Argentina
- Province: Buenos Aires
- Partido: General Arenales
- Elevation: 69 m (226 ft)

Population (2001 census [INDEC])
  - Total: 3,973
- CPA Base: B 6005
- Area code: +54 2352

General Arenales is a town in Buenos Aires Province, Argentina. It is the administrative centre for General Arenales Partido.
