= San Cayetano, Buenos Aires =

San Cayetano
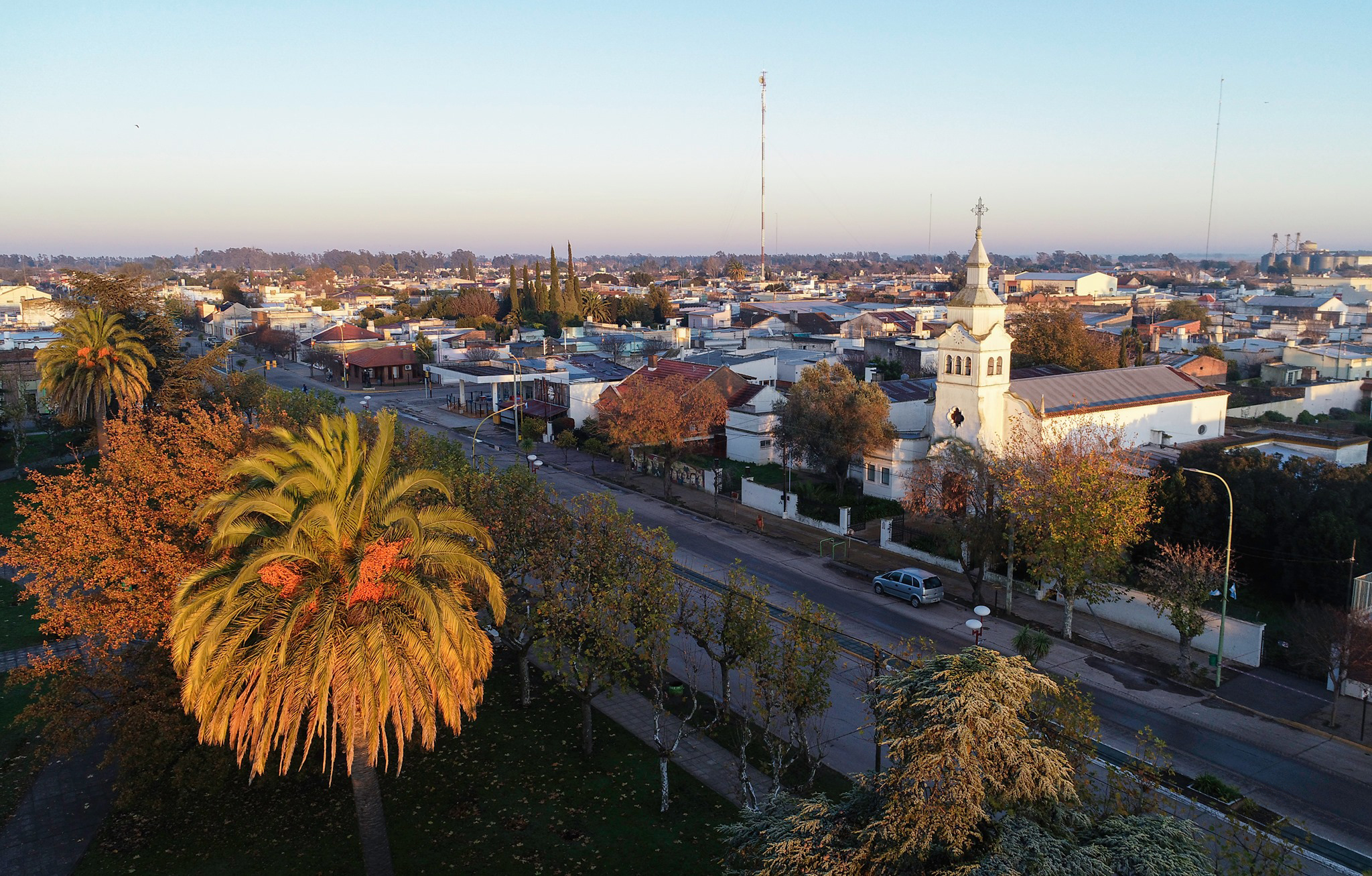

- Location in Argentina
- Coordinates: 38°20′48″S 59°36′34″W
- Country: Argentina
- Province: Buenos Aires
- Partido: San Cayetano
- Founded: 13 March 1911
- Elevation: 98 m (322 ft)

Population (2010 census [INDEC])
  - Total: 8,399
- CPA Base: B 7521
- Area code: +54 2983

San Cayetano is a small town of about 8,000 people in Buenos Aires Province, Argentina. It is the administrative center for San Cayetano Partido. The settlement was established on 13 March 1911 by provincial law.

== Demographics ==
The population of the municipality of San Cayetano decreased from 8,687 in 2001 to 8,399 in 2010, while the population of the town increased 9% from the 2001 census of 6,757 to 7,354 in 2010.

== History ==
In 1903, Victorio de la Canal, whose estancia was named "San Cayetano" after San Cayetano, a Catholic Saint (1480–1547), donated land for a British-owned railway company to build a railroad through the area. On 14 February 1907, the San Cayetano station opened. Pedro Nolasco Carrera, a local landowner with considerable political influence, requested permission to found a town near the railway station on his own land, for which official authorization was received from the provincial governor, Inocencio Arias, on 13 March 1911. Six days later, on 19 March, auctioneer Ramon Tristany conducted the first public auction of lots, both residential and agricultural. The partido, of which it is now a part, was not created until 1958.
