= Salto Partido =

Salto Partido de Salto
- Department
- location of Salto partido in Buenos Aires Province
- Coordinates: 34°18′S 60°15′W
- Country: Argentina
- Established: October 25, 1864
- Founder: provincial law 422
- Seat: Salto

Government
  - Intendant: Ricardo Alessandro (Partido Justicialista)

Area
  - Total: 4,455 km^{2} (1,720 sq mi)

Population
  - Total: 29,189
  - Density: 6.552/km^{2} (16.97/sq mi)
- Demonym: saltense
- Postal Code: B2741
- IFAM: BUE110
- Area Code: 02474
- Patron saint: San Pablo Apóstol
- Website: www.salto.gov.ar

Salto Partido is a partido of Buenos Aires Province in Argentina.

The provincial subdivision has a population of about 29,000 inhabitants in an area of 4,455 km^{2} (1,720 sq mi), and its capital city is Salto, which is around 200 km (120 mi) from Buenos Aires.

== Settlements ==
- Arroyo Dulce
- Inés Indart
- Salto
- Gahan
- Berdier
- La Invencible
- Monroe
- Coronel Isleño
