= General Paz Partido =

General Paz Partido de General Paz
- Department
- location of General Paz Partido in Buenos Aires Province
- Coordinates: 35°32′S 58°17′W
- Country: Argentina
- Established: October 25, 1864
- Founder: provincial law 422
- Seat: Ranchos

Government
  - Intendant: Juan Manuel Álvarez (PJ)

Area
  - Total: 1,197 km^{2} (462 sq mi)

Population
  - Total: 10,319
  - Density: 8.621/km^{2} (22.33/sq mi)
- Demonym: pacense
- Postal Code: B1987
- IFAM: BUE051
- Area Code: 02241
- Website: municipalidaddegeneralpaz.gob.ar

General Paz Partido is a partido in the northeast of Buenos Aires Province in Argentina.

The provincial subdivision has a population of about 10,000 inhabitants in an area of 1,197 km^{2} (462 sq mi), and its capital city is Ranchos, which is 110 km (68 mi) from Buenos Aires.

The partido is named in honour of Brigadier General José María Paz, a veteran of the Argentine War of Independence.

== Settlements ==
- Ranchos (pop. 7,333)
- Loma Verde (pop. 596)
- Villanueva (pop. 572)
- Barrio Río Salado (pop. 60)
- Alegre

== See also ==
- Río Salado (Buenos Aires)
