= Arboledas, Argentina =

Coordinates: 36°53′S 61°29′W

Arboledas is a town in Buenos Aires Province, Argentina, located 42 km south-east from the city of Daireaux. According to the 2010 census, the population was 632 inhabitants. The town was settled mainly by Volga Germans and other European immigrants.
