= San Cayetano Partido =

San Cayetano Partido de San Cayetano
- Department
- Flag

- location of San Cayetano Partido in Buenos Aires Province
- Coordinates: 38°22′S 60°16′W
- Country: Argentina
- Province: Buenos Aires Province
- Established: October 24, 1954
- Founder: provincial law 5921
- Seat: San Cayetano

Government
  - Intendant: Miguel Ángel Gargaglione (UCR)

Area
  - Total: 2,757.5 km^{2} (1,064.7 sq mi)

Population
  - Total: 8,399
  - Density: 3.046/km^{2} (7.889/sq mi)
- Demonym: cayenatense
- Postal Code: B7521
- IFAM: BUE113
- Area Code: 02983
- Patron saint: ?
- Website: www.sancayetano.gov.ar

San Cayetano Partido is a partido of Buenos Aires Province in Argentina.

The provincial subdivision has a population of about 8,399 inhabitants in an area of 2,757.5 km^{2} (1,064.7 sq mi). Its capital city is San Cayetano, which is around 628 km (390 mi) from Buenos Aires.

== Name ==
The partido and its cabecera (capital) are named after San Cayetano, a Catholic Saint (1480-1547). In Argentina, he is known as patrón del trabajo, translated as the patron saint of work in English.

== Settlements ==
- Balneario San Cayetano
- Cristiano Muerto
- El Carretero
- San Cayetano
- Lumb
- Deferrari
- Ochandio
