= Pila Partido =

Pila Partido de Pila
- Department
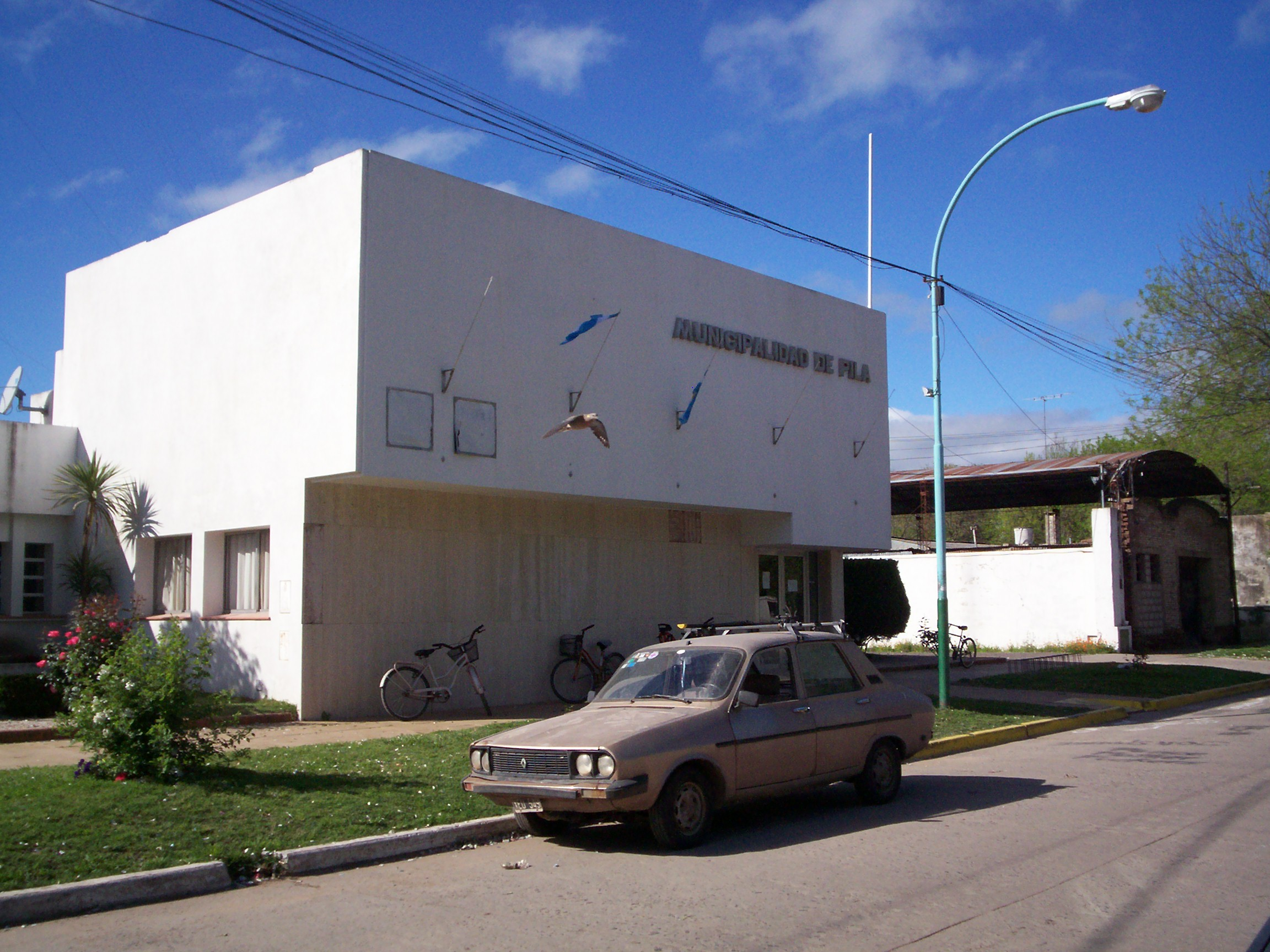

- location of Pila Partido in Buenos Aires Province
- Coordinates: 36°01′S 58°07′W
- Country: Argentina
- Established: December 21, 1839
- Founder: Juan Manuel de Rosas
- Seat: Pila

Government
  - Intendant: Gustavo Sebastián Walker (PJ)

Area
  - Total: 3,453 km^{2} (1,333 sq mi)

Population
  - Total: 3,318
  - Density: 0.9609/km^{2} (2.489/sq mi)
- Demonym: pilense
- Postal Code: B7116
- IFAM: BUE095
- Area Code: 02242
- Website: www.pila.gov.ar

Pila Partido is a partido of Buenos Aires Province in Argentina.

The provincial subdivision has a population of about 3,000 in an area of 3,453 km^{2} (1,333 sq mi), making it one of the most sparsely populated partidos in Buenos Aires Province.

The capital city is Pila, which is around 188 km (117 mi) from Buenos Aires.

== Settlements ==
- Casalins
- La Florida
- La Luz
- La Victoria
- Pila
- Real Audiencia
