= San Andrés de Giles Partido =

San Andrés de Giles Partido de San Andrés de Giles
- Department
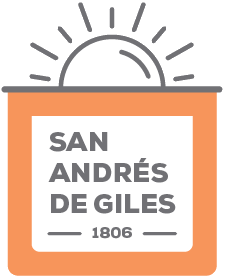

- location of San Andres de Giles Partido in Buenos Aires Province
- Coordinates: 34°26′S 59°26′W
- Country: Argentina
- Established: November 30, 1806
- Founder: Presbítero Vicente Piñero
- Seat: San Andrés de Giles

Government
  - Intendant: Miguel Gesualdi (Union for the Homeland)

Area
  - Total: 1,135 km^{2} (438 sq mi)

Population
  - Total: 23,027
  - Density: 20.29/km^{2} (52.55/sq mi)
- Demonym: gilense
- Postal Code: B6720
- IFAM: BUE111
- Area Code: 02325
- Patron saint: San Andrés Apóstol
- Website: sanandresdegiles.gob.ar

San Andres de Giles Partido is a partido of Buenos Aires Province in Argentina. The capital of the partido is San Andrés de Giles, 103 kilometres (64 mi) west of Buenos Aires and 170 kilometres (110 mi) west of the provincial capital La Plata. The provincial subdivision has a population of 20,829 inhabitants (2001) in an area of 1,132 square kilometres (437 sq mi).

It is bordered by Exaltación de la Cruz in the northeast, Mercedes in the south, Luján in the southeast, Suipacha in the southeast, Carmen de Areco in the east and San Antonio de Areco in the northeast.

== Places ==
=== Cities and towns ===
- San Andrés de Giles (partido seat), (population: 13941)
- Solís, (population: 864)
- Villa Ruiz (population: 465)
- Cucullu (population: 435)
- Azcuénaga (population: 357)
- Villa Espil (population: 167)
- Franklin (population: 71)

=== Other settlements ===
- Espora
- Heavy
- Tuyutí
- La Florida
- San Alberto
- Barrio El Candil
- La Rosada
- Km 108
- Km 125 Paraje El Cóndor
