= Pila, Buenos Aires =

Pila
- Location in Argentina
- Coordinates: 36°01′S 58°07′W
- Country: Argentina
- Province: Buenos Aires
- Partido: Pila
- Founded: December 21, 1839

Population (2001 census [INDEC])
  - Total: 2,085
- CPA Base: B 7116
- Area code: +54 2242

Pila is a small town in Buenos Aires Province, Argentina. It is the administrative centre for Pila Partido.
