= Daireaux =

Town in Buenos Aires Province, Argentina

- Town
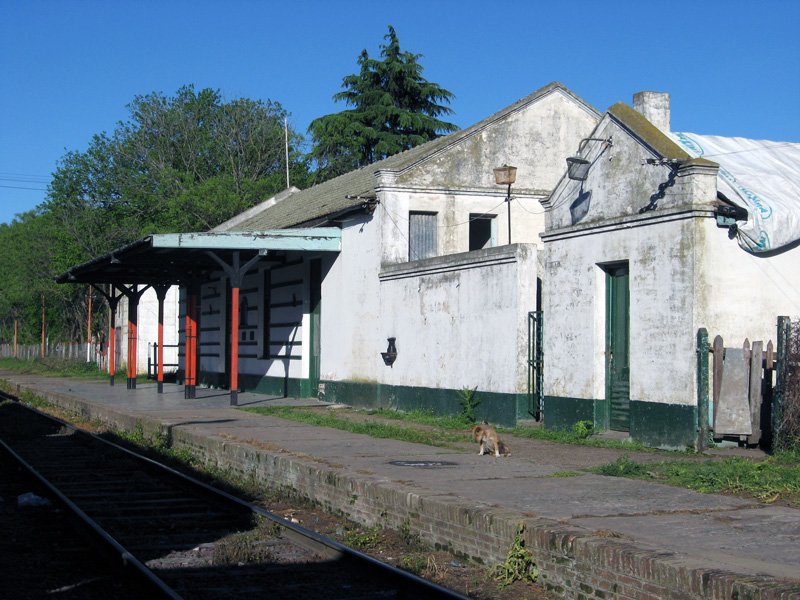

- Coat of arms

- Location in Argentina
- Coordinates: 36°36′S 61°45′W
- Country: Argentina
- Province: Buenos Aires
- Partido: Daireaux
- Founded: July 5, 1910
- Elevation: 112 m (367 ft)

Population (2010 census [INDEC])
  - Total: 16,804
- CPA Base: B 6555
- Area code: +54 2316

Daireaux (Spanish pronunciation: [deˈɾo]) is a town in Buenos Aires Province, Argentina. It is the administrative seat of Daireaux Partido.
