= Zárate, Buenos Aires =

City in Buenos Aires Province, Argentina

Zárate
- City and port
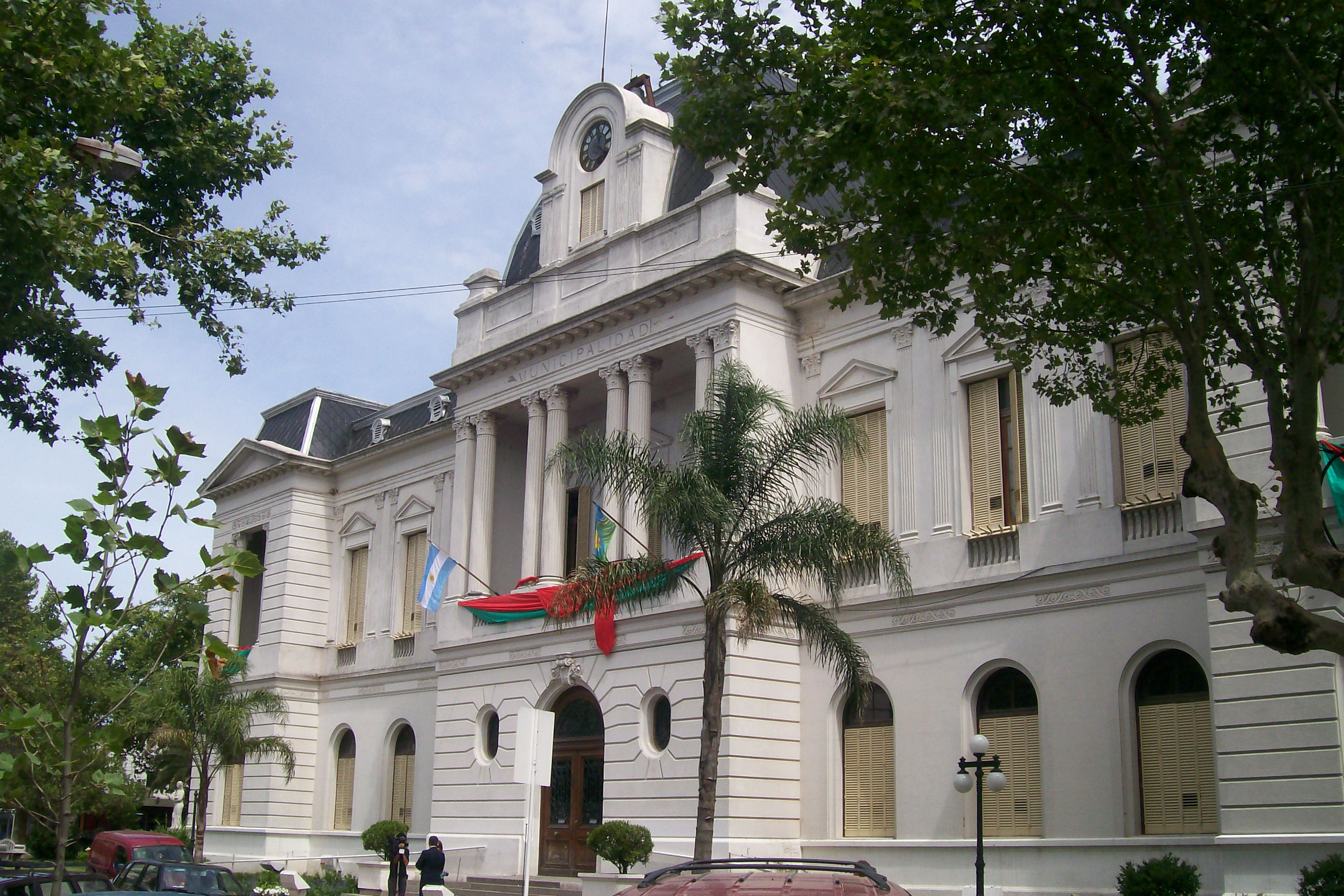

- Coat of arms

- Location in Argentina
- Coordinates: 34°05′S 59°02′W
- Country: Argentina
- Province: Buenos Aires
- Partido: Zárate
- Founded: 1854 (Partido)
- Elevation: 27 m (89 ft)

Population (2010 census)
  - Total: 86,686
- CPA Base: B 2800
- Area code: +54 3487

Zárate is a city and the administrative capital of the Zárate Partido, located in the northern region of the Buenos Aires Province, Argentina. Situated on the right bank of the Paraná River, approximately 60 kilometers northwest of the city of Buenos Aires, it serves as a prominent industrial hub and a critical transport link within the Greater Buenos Aires corridor. As of the 2022 census, the city has a population of 138,022.

Originally established on January 31, 1827, by brothers Pedro and José Antonio Anta, the settlement grew from a colonial port village into an active railway town during the late 19th-century economic modernization. The community officially celebrates its anniversary on 19 March 1854, marking its historic political separation from Exaltación de la Cruz.

== Description ==
It is the administrative capital of the Zárate Partido, located in the north of the Buenos Aires Province, Argentina. Situated on the right bank of the Paraná River, approximately 60 kilometers northwest of the city of Buenos Aires. The city is connected to the Argentine Pampas, the Mesopotamia litoral region, and Mercosur. As of the 2022 census, the city has a population of 138,022 inhabitants.

== History ==
Before Spanish colonization, the coast and islands of the Paraná Delta were inhabited by various indigenous groups, including the Guaraní and Guaycurú. The settlement grew from a small colonial village and shipping port known as "Puerto de Zárate." On January 31, 1827, the town was formally established by the brothers Pedro and José Antonio Anta, who donated and subdivided the land. The settlement experienced rapid development during the 1880s, driven by national economic modernization policies that integrated the coastal port city with the expanding Rail transport in Argentina. While the town was established in 1827, the local community traditionally celebrates its anniversary on 19 March 1854, the date marking the official political creation of the Zárate Partido. 19 March 1854 is the date when they are separated from Exaltación de la Cruz.

== Economy and infrastructure ==
Zárate hosts manufacturing facilities for multinational corporations such as Toyota, Eastman Chemical and Protisa, Quilmes beer, and Isenbeck. It serves as the southern terminus of the National Route 12, and hence the Zárate–Brazo Largo Bridges, which spans the Paraná River.

== Notable residents ==
- Victoria Torni – de facto First Lady of Argentina between 1944 and 1946 as wife of Edelmiro Julián Farrell.

== Gallery ==
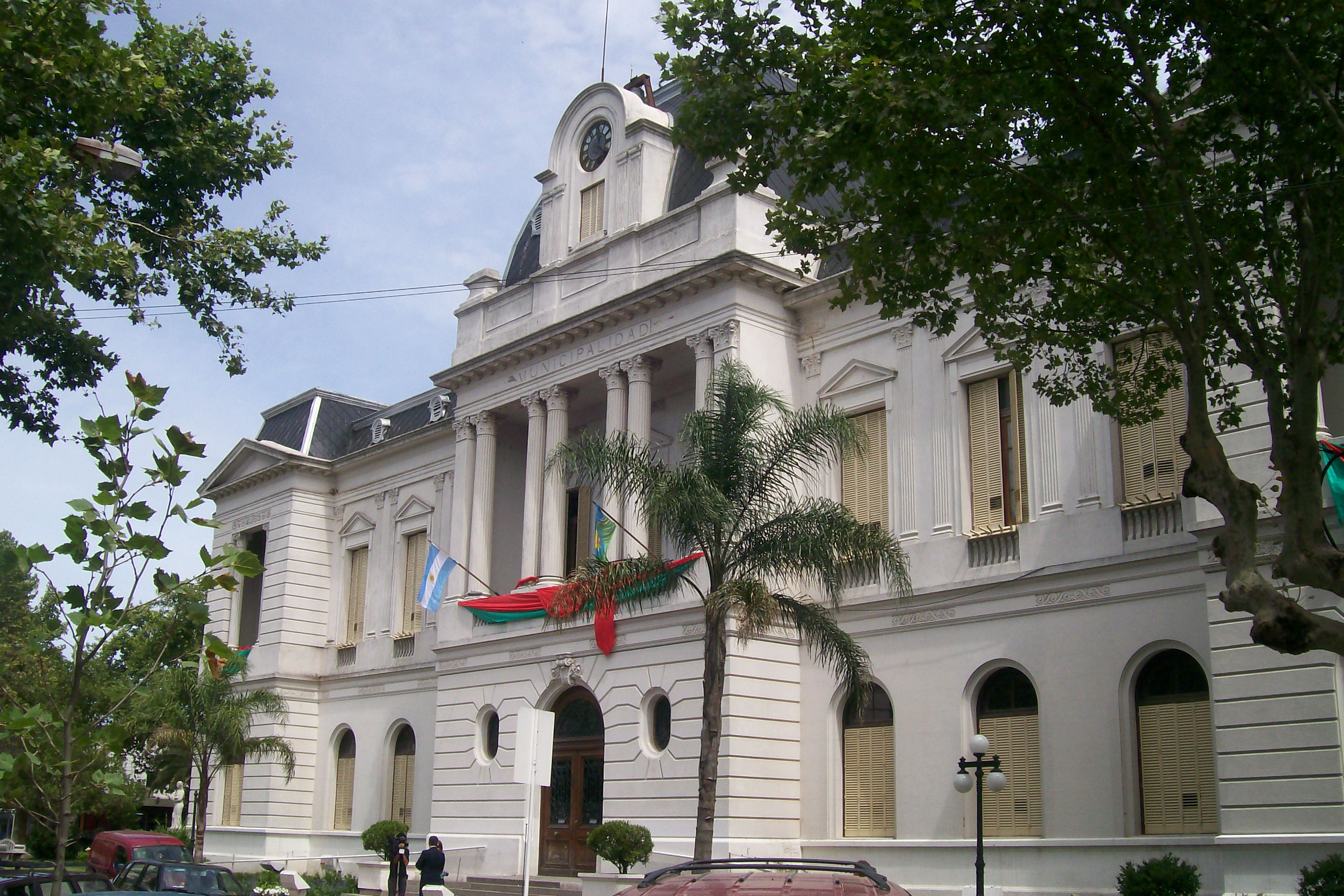
Municipality building.

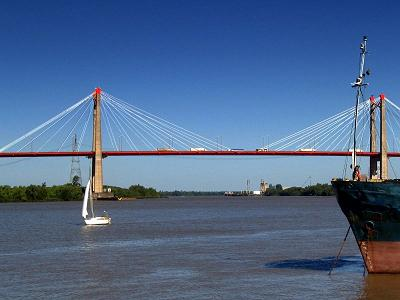
The General Bartolomé Mitre Bridge, part of the Zárate-Brazo Largo bridge complex.

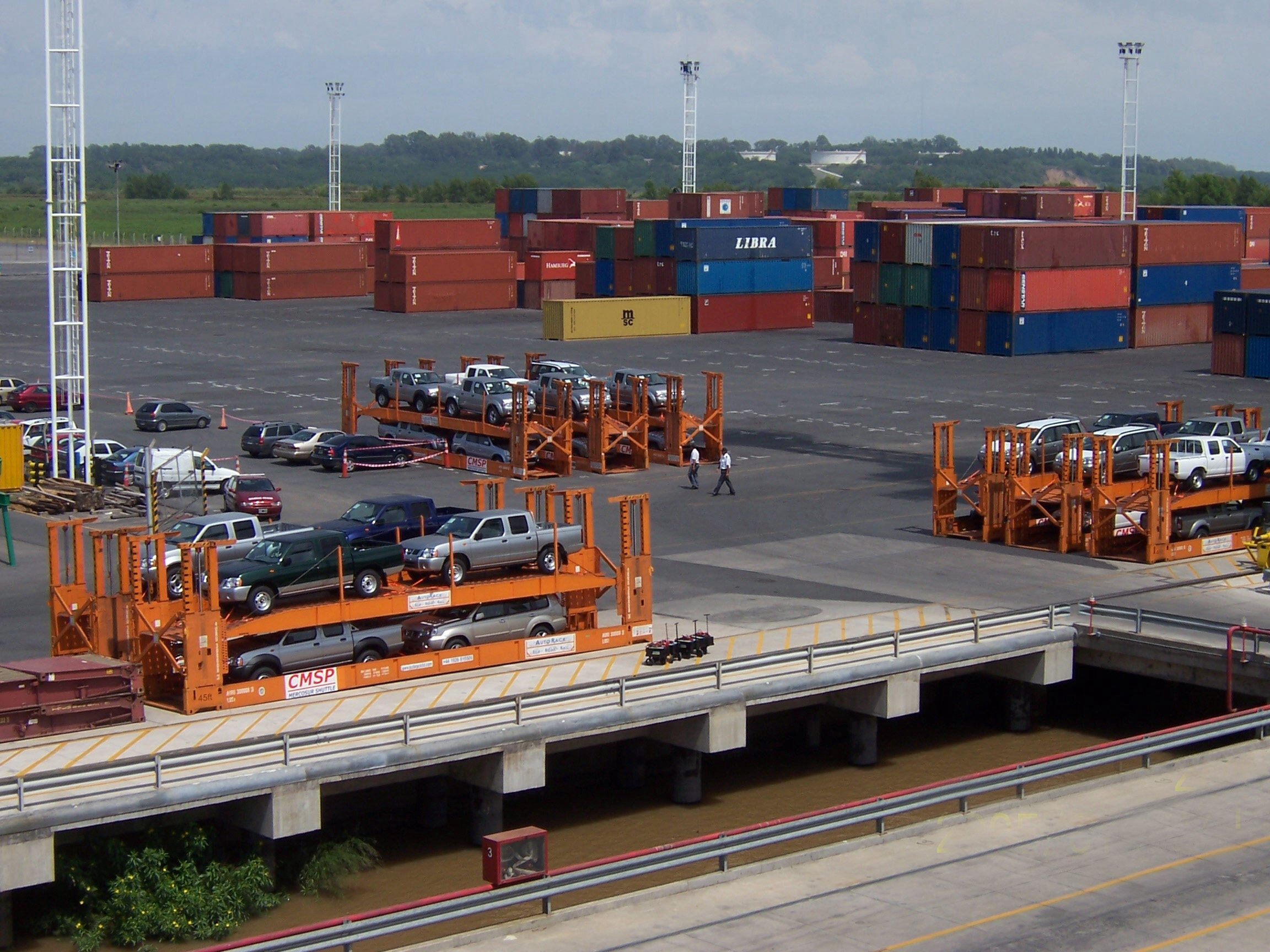
Partial view of private commercial docks in Zárate.

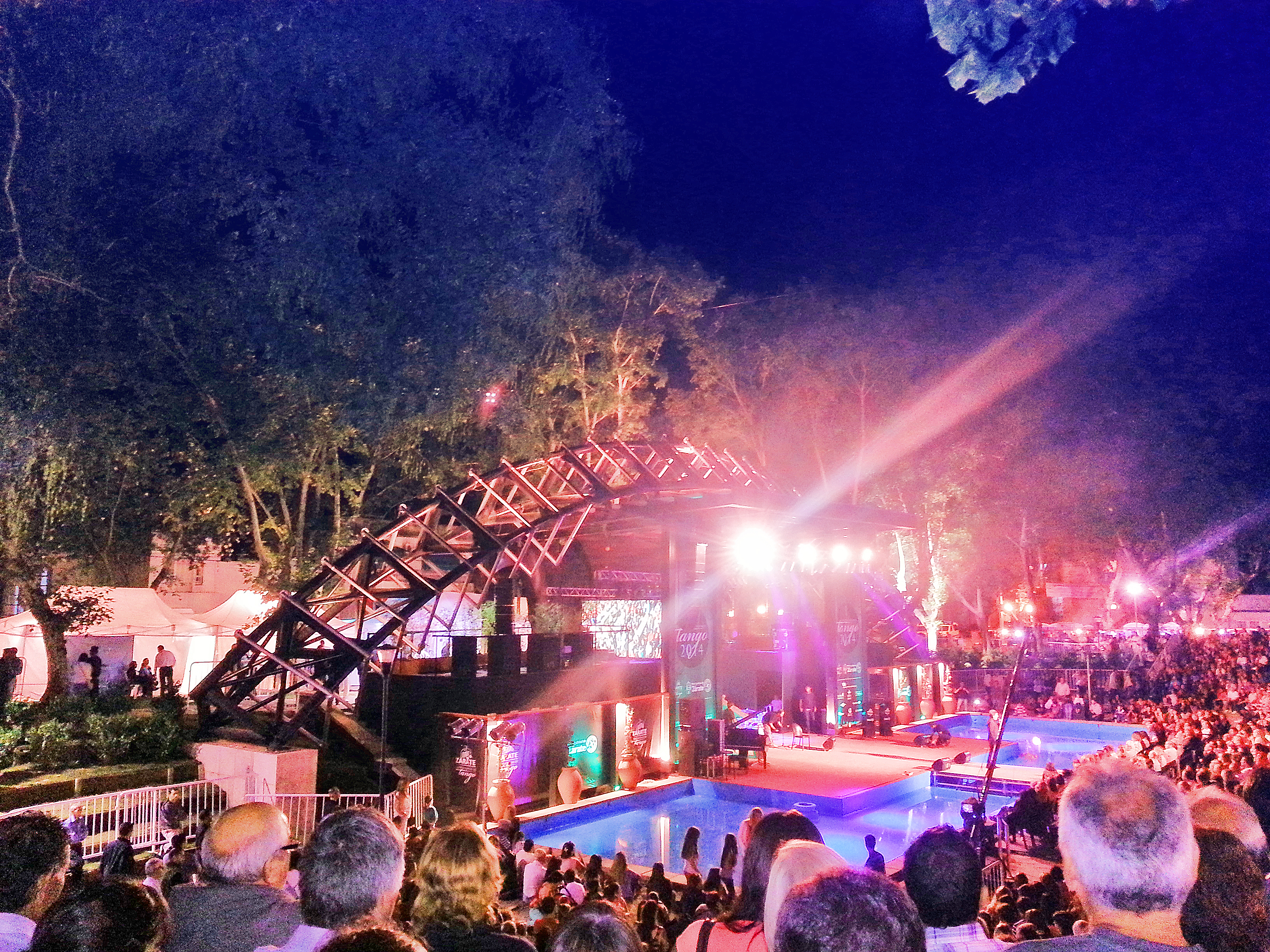
The "Homero Exposito" Amphitheater, located in the "Italia" Square.
