= Salto, Buenos Aires =

Salto
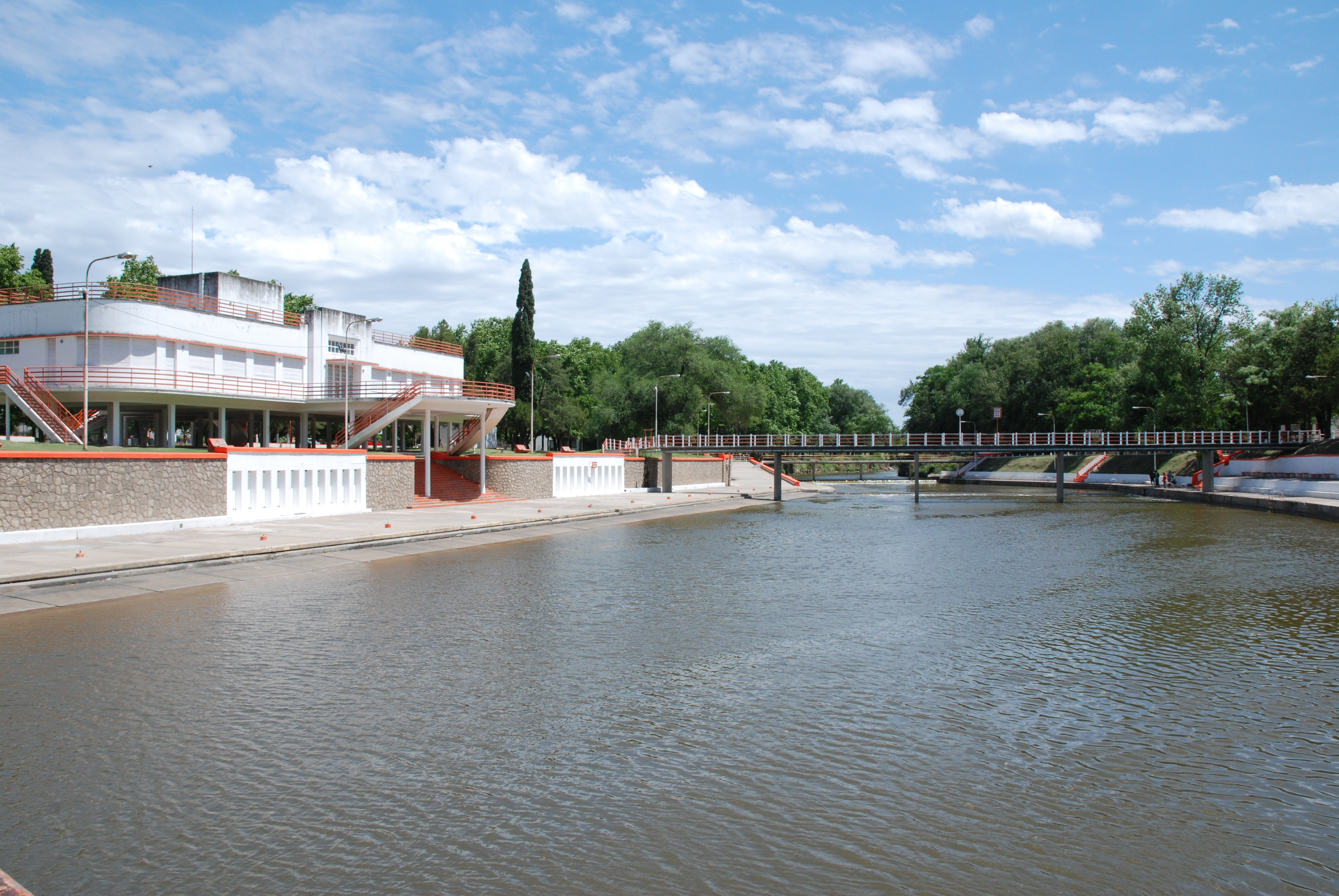
- Salto(BA) Balneario

- Location in Argentina
- Coordinates: 34°17′S 60°14′W
- Country: Argentina
- Province: Buenos Aires
- Partido: Salto
- Elevation: 33 m (108 ft)

Population (2010)
  - Total: 32 653
- CPA Base: B 2741
- Area code: +54 2474

Salto is a city in Buenos Aires Province, Argentina. It is the administrative headquarters for Salto Partido. It is about 200 km (124 mi) from Buenos Aires and 55 km ( 34 mi) from Pergamino. Salto is an agricultural community, crossed by a river, that has some of the best fields of the province. Its main crops are soybean, corn and sorghum. It also has some important factories such as Arcor, Pioneer Hi-Bred, Metrive and Soychú.
