= Campana Partido =

Campana Partido Partido de Campana
- Partidos of Buenos Aires Province
- Coat of arms

- Campana Partido in Buenos Aires Province
- Coordinates: 34°08′S 58°52′W
- Country: Argentina
- Established: July 6, 1885
- Founder: Eduardo Costa
- Seat: Campana

Government
  - Intendant: Sebastián Abella (Cambiemos)

Area
  - Total: 982 km^{2} (379 sq mi)

Population
  - Total: 83,698
  - Density: 85.2/km^{2} (221/sq mi)
- Demonym: campanense
- Postal Code: B2804
- IFAM: BUE017
- Area Code: 03489
- Patron saint: Santa Florentina
- Website: campana.gov.ar

Campana Partido (Spanish: Partido de Campana) is a partido in the north-east of Buenos Aires Province in Argentina.

The provincial subdivision has a population of around 84,000 inhabitants in an area of 982 km^{2} (379 sq mi), and its capital city is Campana, which is 75 km (47 mi) from Buenos Aires.

== Economy ==
The economy of Campana went through significant decline in the late 20th century, but the town and its partido are going through an economic and cultural resurgence, which is reflected by its recent growth in population.

== Attractions ==
- Museo del Automóvil "Manuel Iglesias", display of antique cars, including the oldest car in Argentina.
- Museo Ferroviario "Víctor Capusso", museum of the Central Argentino and Mitre railway lines.
- Teatro Municipal "Pedro Barbero", Theatre.
- Salón de Exposiciones "Ronald Nash", exhibition and conference centre.
- Centro Cultural La Rosa, cultural centre and theatre.
- Librería El Garage, book store and display of local arts.

== Sports ==
Campana is home to Club Villa Dálmine, a football club that currently plays in Argentina's regionalised 3nd division, and to Puerto Nuevo, an older club that plays in 4th division.

== Locations ==
- Campana
- Alto Los Cardales
- Lomas del Río Luján
