= Zárate Partido =

Zárate Partido de Zárate
- Department
- Coat of arms

- location of Zárate Partido in Buenos Aires Province
- Coordinates: 34°06′S 59°02′W
- Country: Argentina
- Established: March 19, 1854
- Founder: ?
- Seat: Zárate

Government
  - Intendant: Marcelo Matzkin (PRO)

Area
  - Total: 1,202 km^{2} (464 sq mi)

Population
  - Total: 101,271
  - Density: 84.25/km^{2} (218.2/sq mi)
- Demonym: zarateña/o
- Postal Code: B2800
- IFAM: BUE134
- Area Code: 03487
- Patron saint: ?
- Website: www.zarate.gov.ar

Zárate Partido is a partido of Buenos Aires Province in Argentina.

The provincial subdivision has a population of about 101,000 inhabitants in an area of 1,202 km^{2} (464 sq mi), and its capital city is Zárate, which is around 86 km (53 mi) from Buenos Aires.
