= San Andrés de Giles =

- Town
- Location in Argentina
- Coordinates: 34°26′S 59°26′W
- Country: Argentina
- Province: Buenos Aires
- Partido: San Andrés de Giles
- Elevation: 46 m (151 ft)

Population (2001 census [INDEC])
  - Total: 13,941
- CPA base: B6720
- Area code: +54 2325

San Andrés de Giles is a town in the Buenos Aires Province of Argentina. It serves as the administrative seat of the San Andrés de Giles Partido.
