= Partidos of Buenos Aires =

Administrative territorial entity of Buenos Aires Province, Argentina

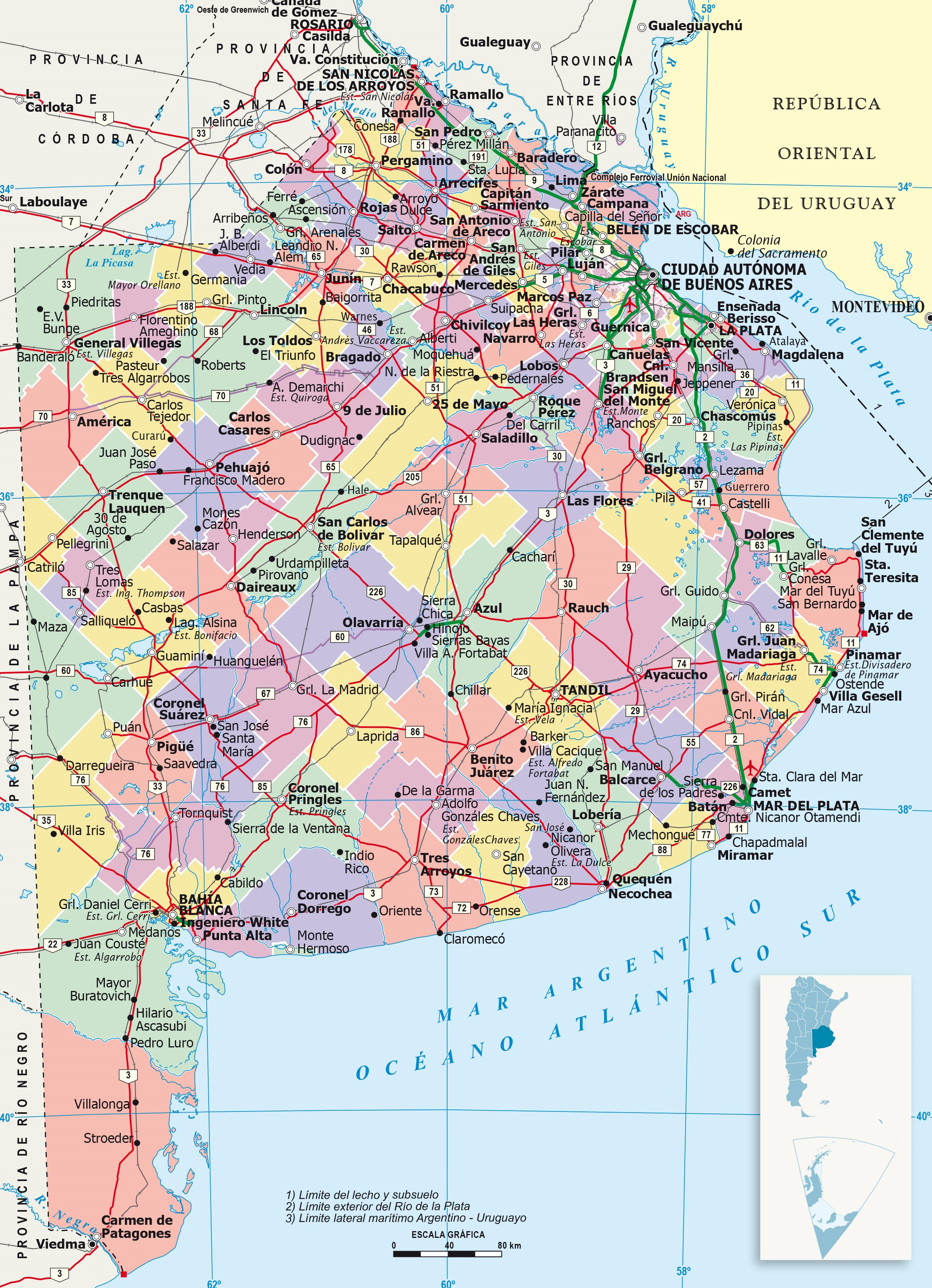
Political division of the province

A partido is the second-level administrative subdivision used only in the province of Buenos Aires, Argentina. They are formally considered to be a single administrative unit, usually contain one or more population centers (i.e., towns and cities), and are divided into localidades. The subdivision in partidos in Buenos Aires Province is distinct from all other provinces of Argentina, which call their second-level subdivisions departamento and are further subdivided into distinct municipalities.

== History ==
By the end of 18th century the town council (cabildo) of Buenos Aires established the first partidos in the countryside: San Isidro del Pago de la Costa (San Isidro) in 1779 and San Vicente, Quilmes, Magdalena, La Matanza, Cañada de Morón (Morón), Las Conchas (Tigre) and San Pedro in 1784.

At the head of every partido, the cabildo appointed a rural judge called Alcalde de la Santa Hermandad. The judge, or alcalde, had the mission to maintain the law and order in the surrounding rural area of Buenos Aires, fighting against cattle raiders. The alcalde was helped by a constabulary called Santa Hermandad (Holy Brotherhood) created in the late 15th century by the Catholic Monarchs and transplanted to the colonies.

In 1821 the Governor Martín Rodríguez and his minister Bernardino Rivadavia dissolved the cabildos and since then was the governor itself who appointed the judges, now called Juez de Paz (Justice of the Peace), his administrative territory was called Partido judicial (Judicial district) hence the name of the subdivision.

In 1856 the office of Juez de Paz was replaced by a Presidente de la Municipalidad, or Municipal President. It was appointed by the Governor from a list of three candidates presented by the Municipales, or councillors, who were elected by the citizens of the different partidos.

Since 1890 the head of the government is called Intendente (Intendant), or Mayor, and is directly elected by the citizens.

On October 24, 1864 the Legislature of the Province of Buenos Aires sanctioned law № 422, dividing the province into 45 partidos: Arrecifes, Baradero, Barrancas al Sud (Avellaneda), Belgrano (Barrio Belgrano), Cañuelas, Carmen de Areco, Chacabuco, Chascomús, Chivilcoy, del Pilar, Ensenada, Exaltación de la Cruz, General las Heras, General San Martín, Giles, Junín, Matanza, Las Conchas (Tigre), Lobos, Lomas de Zamora, Luján, Magdalena, Mercedes, Merlo, Monte, Moreno, Morón, Navarro, Pergamino, Quilmes, Ramallo, Ranchos, Rivadavia, Rojas, Salto, San Antonio, San Fernando, San Isidro, San José de Flores (Barrio Flores), San Nicolás, San Pedro, San Vicente, Suipacha, Viedma and Zárate.

== Government ==
Population	Councillors
at most 5,000	6
5,000-10,000	10
10,000-20,000	12
20,000-30,000	14
30,000-40,000	16
40,000-80,000	18
80,000-200,000	20
more than 200,000	24

Every partido is administered by an executive and a legislative branch, respectively, the mayor (intendente) and a council (concejo deliberante), similar to a county council. It is considered a strong mayor-council form of government.

The mayor is elected to four-year terms and can be reelected for a new term. If they have been re-elected, they can not be re-elected in the same position, but with an interval of one period.

The council is a unicameral body, one-half of whose members are elected every two years to serve four-year terms and can be reelected for a new term. If they have been re-elected, they can not be re-elected in the same position, but with an interval of one period.

The number of councillors depends on the population of every partido. According to decret-law 6769/58 the number of councillors varies as follows:

== List of partidos ==
Buenos Aires Province is divided into 135 partidos.

Name	Capital	Area (km^{2})	Population	Flag	Coat of Arms / Logos	Map
Adolfo Alsina	Carhué	5,882	17,552			
Adolfo Gonzáles Chaves	Adolfo Gonzales Chaves	3,789	12,914			
Alberti	Alberti	1,123	12,982			
Almirante Brown	Adrogué	129	584,827			
Arrecifes	Arrecifes	1,244	32,215			
Avellaneda	Avellaneda	56	367,554			
Ayacucho	Ayacucho	6,756	21,977			
Azul	Azul	6,638	75,905			
Bahía Blanca	Bahía Blanca	2,240	336,574			
Balcarce	Balcarce	4,120	48,982			
Baradero	Baradero	1,530	40,002			
Benito Juárez	Benito Juárez	5,336	22,292			
Berazategui	Berazategui	220	358,712			
Berisso	Berisso	145	100,930			
Bolívar	San Carlos de Bolívar	4,935	37,594			
Bragado	Bragado	2,199	46,504			
Brandsen	Brandsen	1,114	32,448			
Campana	Campana	986	110,566			
Cañuelas	Cañuelas	1,186	70,684			
Capitán Sarmiento	Capitán Sarmiento	549	15,965			
Carlos Casares	Carlos Casares	2,532	23,100			
Carlos Tejedor	Carlos Tejedor	3,912	14,079			
Carmen de Areco	Carmen de Areco	1,061	17,499			
Castelli	Castelli	2,113	9,594			
Chacabuco	Chacabuco	2,290	52,731			
Chascomús	Chascomús	3,159	42,452			
Chivilcoy	Chivilcoy	2,059	70,839			
Colón	Colón	1,001	27,504			
Coronel Dorrego	Coronel Dorrego	5,845	15,968			
Coronel Pringles	Coronel Pringles	5,257	24,420			
Coronel Rosales	Punta Alta	1,290	67,503			
Coronel Suárez	Coronel Suárez	5,984	42,110			
Daireaux	Daireaux	3,823	18,422			
Dolores	Dolores	1,978	32,032			
Ensenada	Ensenada	114	63,997			
Escobar	Belén de Escobar	301	256,268			
Esteban Echeverría	Monte Grande	121	338,480			
Exaltación de la Cruz	Capilla del Señor	637	40,159			
Ezeiza	Ezeiza	238	201,511			
Florencio Varela	Florencio Varela	190	496,433			
Florentino Ameghino	Florentino Ameghino	1,813	10,790			
General Alvarado	Miramar	1,628	45,526			
General Alvear	General Alvear	3,366	13,031			
General Arenales	General Arenales	1,486	16,350			
General Belgrano	General Belgrano	1,858	20,791			
General Guido	General Guido	2,326	3,174			
General La Madrid	General La Madrid	4,814	11,618			
General Las Heras	General Las Heras	751	18,022			
General Lavalle	General Lavalle	2,705	4,870			
General Madariaga	General Juan Madariaga	2,982	22,624			
General Paz	Ranchos	1,200	14,207			
General Pinto	General Pinto	2,558	12,941			
General Pueyrredón	Mar de Plata	1,462	667,082			
General Rodríguez	General Rodríguez	367	142,709			
General San Martín	San Martín	57	450,575			
General Viamonte	Los Toldos	2,140	22,649			
General Villegas	General Villegas	7,262	35,251			
Guaminí	Guaminí	4,824	11,801			
Hipólito Yrigoyen	Henderson	1,645	10,661			
Hurlingham	Hurlingham	36	185,641			
Ituzaingó	Ituzaingó	38	180,232			
José C. Paz	José C. Paz	50	326,992			
Junín	Junín	2,255	103,787			
La Costa	Mar del Tuyú	234	100,689			
La Matanza	San Justo	327	1,841,247			
La Plata	La Plata	893	768,470			
Lanús	Lanús	50	461,267			
Laprida	Laprida	3,448	11,646			
Las Flores	Las Flores	3,341	27,239			
Leandro N. Alem	Vedia	1,606	17,266			
Lezama	Lezama	1,047	6,221			
Lincoln	Lincoln	5,778	45,506			
Lobería	Lobería	4,720	18,243			
Lobos	Lobos	1,726	41,760			
Lomas de Zamora	Lomas de Zamora	89	690,323			
Luján	Luján	771	111,008			
Magdalena	Magdalena	1,850	26,830			
Maipú	Maipú	2,604	11,323			
Malvinas Argentinas	Los Polvorines	63	350,674			
Mar Chiquita	Coronel Vidal	3,089	33,110			
Marcos Paz	Marcos Paz	422	67,011			
Mercedes	Mercedes	1,050	72,980			
Merlo	Merlo	174	582,486			
Monte	San Miguel del Monte	1,876	24,868			
Monte Hermoso	Monte Hermoso	200	8,465			
Moreno	Moreno	186	576,632			
Morón	Morón	55	331,183			
Navarro	Navarro	1,620	19,899			
Necochea	Necochea	4,566	102,110			
Nueve de Julio	Nueve de Julio	4,291	52,607			
Olavarría	Olavarría	7,666	125,751			
Patagones	Carmen de Patagones	13,564	37,646			
Pehuajó	Pehuajó	4,523	44,783			
Pellegrini	Pellegrini	1,821	7,143			
Pergamino	Pergamino	3,005	115,340			
Pila	Pila	3,449	4,642			
Pilar	Pilar	385	394,754			
Pinamar	Pinamar	66	39,449			
Presidente Perón	Guernica	122	102,106			
Puan	Puan	6,376	16,613			
Punta Indio	Verónica	1,605	12,297			
Quilmes	Quilmes	92	633,391			
Ramallo	Ramallo	1,048	39,730			
Rauch	Rauch	4,313	16,635			
Rivadavia	América	3,955	19,849			
Rojas	Rojas	2,060	25,627			
Roque Pérez	Roque Pérez	1,556	13,977			
Saavedra	Pigüé	3,546	22,537			
Saladillo	Saladillo	2,706	35,656			
Salliqueló	Salliqueló	796	9,427			
Salto	Salto	1,611	39,425			
San Andrés de Giles	San Andrés de Giles	1,129	26,510			
San Antonio de Areco	San Antonio de Areco	862	26,897			
San Cayetano	San Cayetano	2,997	8,994			
San Fernando	San Fernando de la Buena Vista	993	171,616			
San Isidro	San Isidro	52	297,282			
San Miguel	San Miguel	83	328,835			
San Nicolás	San Nicolás de los Arroyos	681	167,824			
San Pedro	San Pedro	1,357	68,613			
San Vicente	San Vicente	661	98,215			
Suipacha	Suipacha	943	11,786			
Tandil	Tandil	4,855	145,575			
Tapalqué	Tapalqué	4,169	10,783			
Tigre	Tigre	394	446,949			
Tordillo	General Conesa	1,334	2,542			
Tornquist	Tornquist	4,160	14,810			
Trenque Lauquen	Trenque Lauquen	5,498	49,309			
Tres Arroyos	Tres Arroyos	5,927	62,426			
Tres de Febrero	Caseros	45	364,176			
Tres Lomas	Tres Lomas	1,252	9,164			
Veinticinco de Mayo	Veinticinco de Mayo	4,789	35,563			
Vicente López	Olivos	35	282,281			
Villa Gesell	Villa Gesell	164	37,463			
Villarino	Médanos	10,399	32,717			
Zárate	Zárate	1,185	132,221			

== See also ==
- Communes of Buenos Aires – second-level administrative divisions in the Autonomous City of Buenos Aires
- Departments of Argentina – second-level administrative divisions elsewhere in Argentina

Spanish language page has more data on more of the partidos: https://es.wikipedia.org/wiki/Anexo:Partidos_de_la_provincia_de_Buenos_Aires
