= Mario Meoni =

Argentine politician (1965–2021)

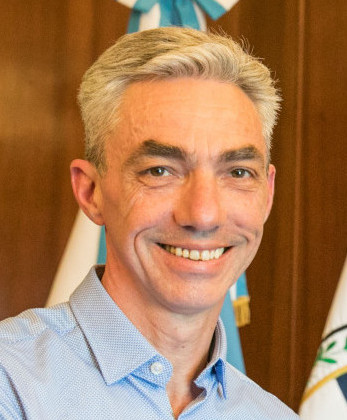
- Meoni in 2019

Minister of Transport
- In office 10 December 2019 – 23 April 2021
- President: Alberto Fernández
- Preceded by: Guillermo Dietrich
- Succeeded by: Alexis Guerrera

Mayor of Junín
- In office 10 December 2003 – 10 December 2015
- Preceded by: Abel Paulino Miguel
- Succeeded by: Pablo Petrecca

Provincial Deputy of Buenos Aires
- In office 10 December 1999 – 10 December 2003
- Constituency: Fourth Electoral Section

Personal details
- Born: Mario Andrés Meoni; 22 January 1965 Ascensión, General Arenales, Buenos Aires Province, Argentina
- Died: 23 April 2021 (aged 56) San Andrés de Giles Partido, Argentina
- Party: UCR (1983–2007; 2010–2013); Renewal Front (2013–2021)
- Other political affiliations: Plural Consensus (2006–2008); UDESO (2011–2012); United for a New Alternative (2015–2017); Frente de Todos (2019–2021)
- Spouse: Laura Oliva (m. 1991)
- Children: 2

Mario Andrés Meoni (Spanish pronunciation: [ˈmaɾjo anˈdɾes meˈoni]; 22 January 1965 – 23 April 2021) was an Argentine politician who served as Minister of Transport from 2019 until his death in 2021. He had previously served as intendente (mayor) of Junín, a partido in Buenos Aires Province, from 2003 to 2015.

== Early and personal life ==
Mario Andrés Meoni was born in 1965 in a road camp in Ascensión, a small town in General Arenales Partido in northern Buenos Aires Province. His father was a roadway maintenance worker, and he was of Italian descent through his grandfather, who worked as a smith. His family moved to Junín when he was six years old.

He became interested in political activism after the return of democracy to Argentina in 1983, being drawn to the Radical Civic Union (UCR) inspired by President Raúl Alfonsín. Meoni's political career began as private secretary to then-UCR senator Leopoldo Moreau.

Meoni married Laura Oliva in 1991 and together they had twin sons.

== Political career ==
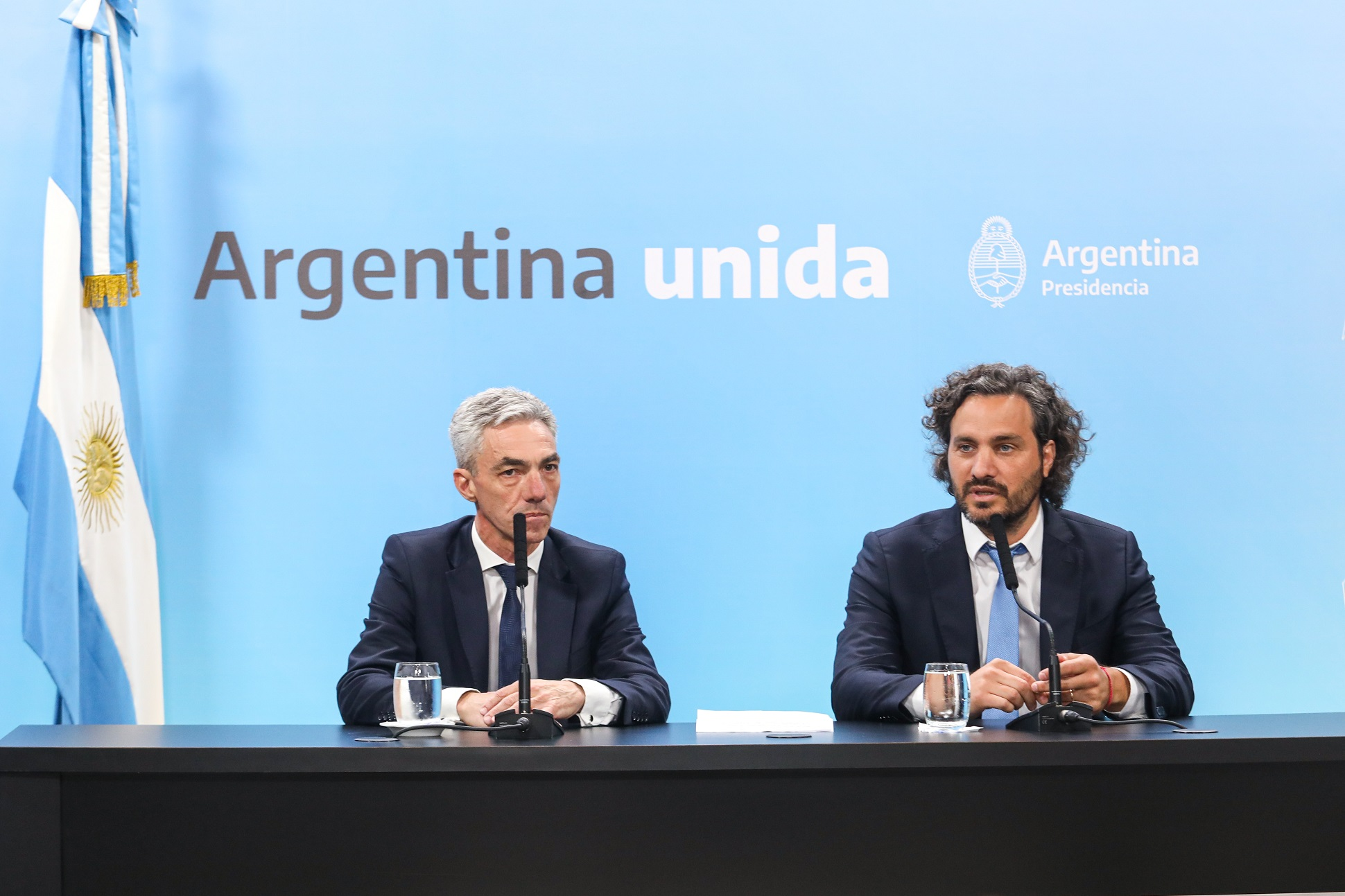
Meoni (left) as Minister of Transport and Chief of Cabinet Santiago Cafiero during a joint press conference in February 2020

In 1987, Meoni was hired to work in the Plan Alimentario Nacional (PAN) of the Ministry of Social Action, during the presidency of Raúl Alfonsín. From 1991 to 1995 he was a local councillor in Junín, then going on to work as secretary of the UCR parliamentary bloc in the Argentine Chamber of Deputies from 1995 to 1999.

In 1999 Meoni was elected to the Buenos Aires Province Chamber of Deputies in the UCR list, representing the fourth electoral district; he was the parliamentary bloc's vice president.

=== Intendencia of Junín ===
In 2003, after several unsuccessful runs, Meoni won the UCR primary to the intendencia (mayoralty) of Junín. He was elected mayor on 14 September 2003 with 38.34% of the vote.

Ahead of the 2007 general election, Meoni left the ranks of the UCR and joined the dissident "Radicales K" who supported the Kirchnerist government and the presidential candidacy of Cristina Fernández de Kirchner; thus he ran for re-election in the provincial list of the Plural Consensus coalition.

During his second term as intendente, Meoni became a major collaborator of the OAS-based MuNET local development and transparency programme.

Following the 2008 conflict between the government and farmers, in 2010 Meoni joined other radicales K who followed Vice President Julio Cobos in abandoning the Plural Consensus front and petitioning the UCR to allow them back into the party. Meoni went on to call for a public referendum to validate Cobos's permanency in his post following his controversial vote against Resolution 125, an idea that never materialized.

Meoni ran for a third term in 2011, this time forming part of Unión Social para el Desarrollo (UDESO), the electoral alliance that backed the presidential candidacy of Ricardo Alfonsín. On that occasion, Meoni won with 41.27% against the candidate from the Front for Victory. During his third term and starting in 2013, Meoni became close to Sergio Massa's Renewal Front.

In 2015, Meoni ran for a fourth term, this time under the United for a New Alternative coalition of which the Renewal Front was part. Meoni lost against the PRO candidate, Pablo Petracca, by over 7 thousand votes.

=== Banco Provincia and Ministry of Transport ===
On 14 January 2016, Meoni was appointed one of the members of the directive board of the Bank of the Province of Buenos Aires (Banco Provincia) by the Provincial Senate of Buenos Aires, representing the Renewal Front and in replacement of Daniel Arroyo. At the 2019 general election, Meoni ran again for the mayoralty of Junín against incumbent Petracca, but failed to regain the district and lost by a wide margin.

On 6 December 2019, President-elect Alberto Fernández announced the composition of his incoming cabinet, in which Meoni was touted to be the next Minister of Transport, succeeding Guillermo Dietrich. He took office alongside the rest of the cabinet on 10 December 2019.

== Death ==
Just before 10 p.m. on 23 April 2021, Meoni died when his Ford Mondeo lost control and overturned on Route 7 near San Andrés de Giles, a town in Buenos Aires Province. He was 56 years old. He was heading towards Junín, the city he had previously served in and where his family lives.

Political offices
Preceded by Abel Paulino Miguel	Mayor of Junín; 2003–2015	Succeeded by Pablo Petracca
Preceded by Guillermo Dietrich	Minister of Transport; 2019–2021	Succeeded by Alexis Guerrera
