= Death and state funeral of Raúl Alfonsín =

2009 state funeral in Argentina

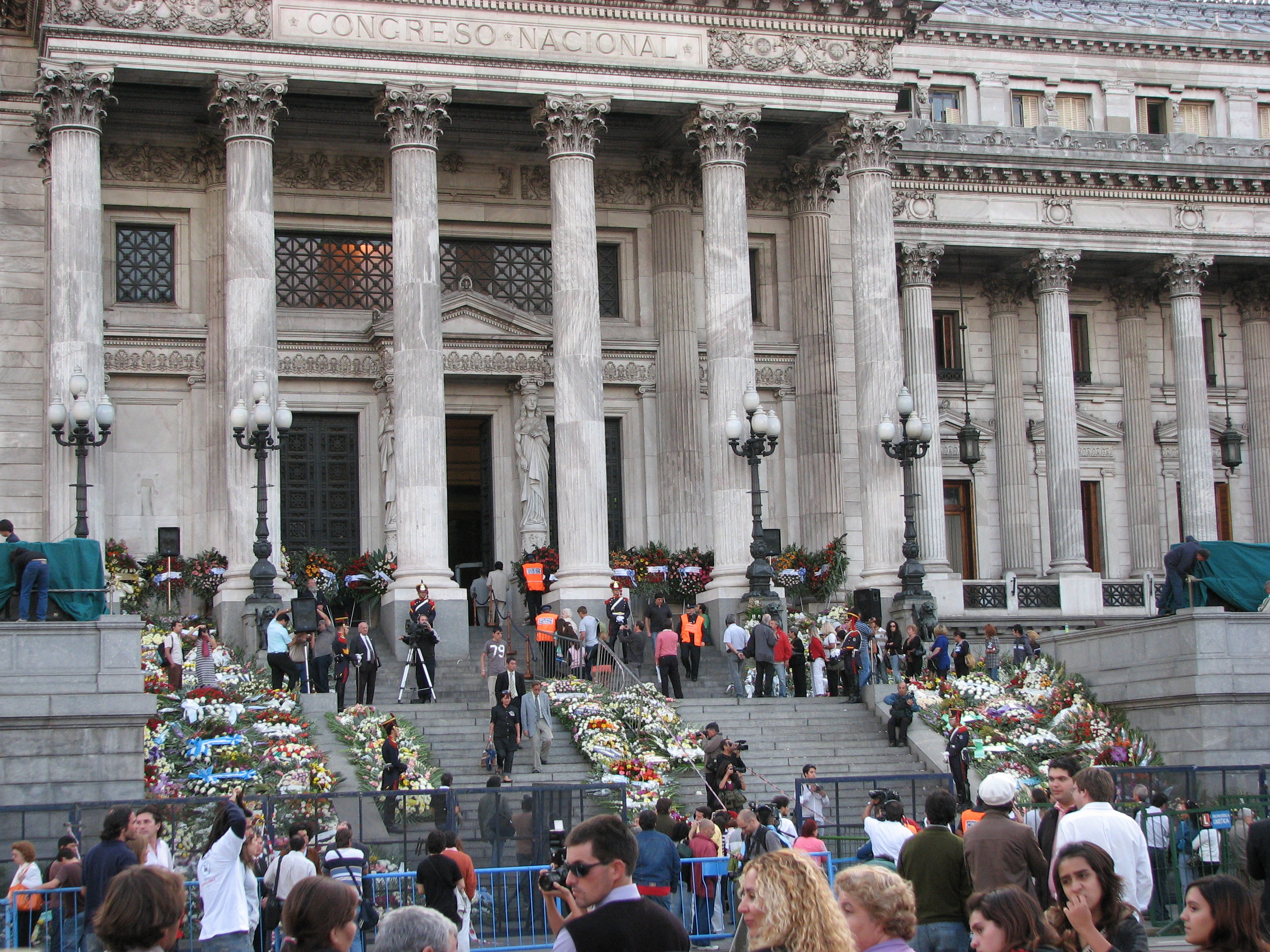
- People during the funeral of Alfonsín, at the Argentine Congress
- Date: March 31, 2009
- Duration: 3 days
- Venue: Palace of the Argentine National Congress, La Recoleta Cemetery
- Location: Buenos Aires, Argentina
- Type: State funeral
- Burial: Raúl Alfonsín

Raúl Alfonsín was the president of Argentina from 1983 to 1989. He died on March 31, 2009, aged 82. He had lung cancer and died at his home; a massive candlelight vigil took place in the vicinity of it. Vice President Julio Cobos, the acting president at the time, arranged three days of national mourning and a state funeral at the Palace of the Argentine National Congress. Alfonsín was seen by 40,000 people and the senior politicians of the country; people from other countries also voiced their respect for him. A military escort took his coffin to the La Recoleta Cemetery, and left him at the pantheon for the veterans of the Revolution of the Park.

== Health and death ==
Alfonsín had lung cancer for almost a year before his death, which led to pneumonia. His medic Alejandro Sandler explained that his health had worsened at several points, which were followed by brief recoveries. In his last days he was visited by vice president Julio Cobos and monsignor Justo Laguna, who gave him the Anointing of the Sick. He received home care, as Sandler preferred him to stay with his family. The president Cristina Fernández de Kirchner was out of the country and phoned several times; Ricardo Alfonsín called her at 17:00 and informed her of his father's health. He died on March 31, 2009, at 20:30; Sandler announced it at 21:03. Alfonsín was sleeping at the moment, next to his family. Cobos was the first politician to arrive at his home.

== Funeral ==
When the first news of the death of Alfonsín were released, the vicinity of his house at the Santa Fe avenue was filled by hundreds of people, who started a Candlelight vigil. The multitude included friends, neighbors and political supporters. The politicians Felipe Solá and Ricardo Gil Lavedra attended the meeting as well. The balconies of nearby houses were filled with flowers and banners.

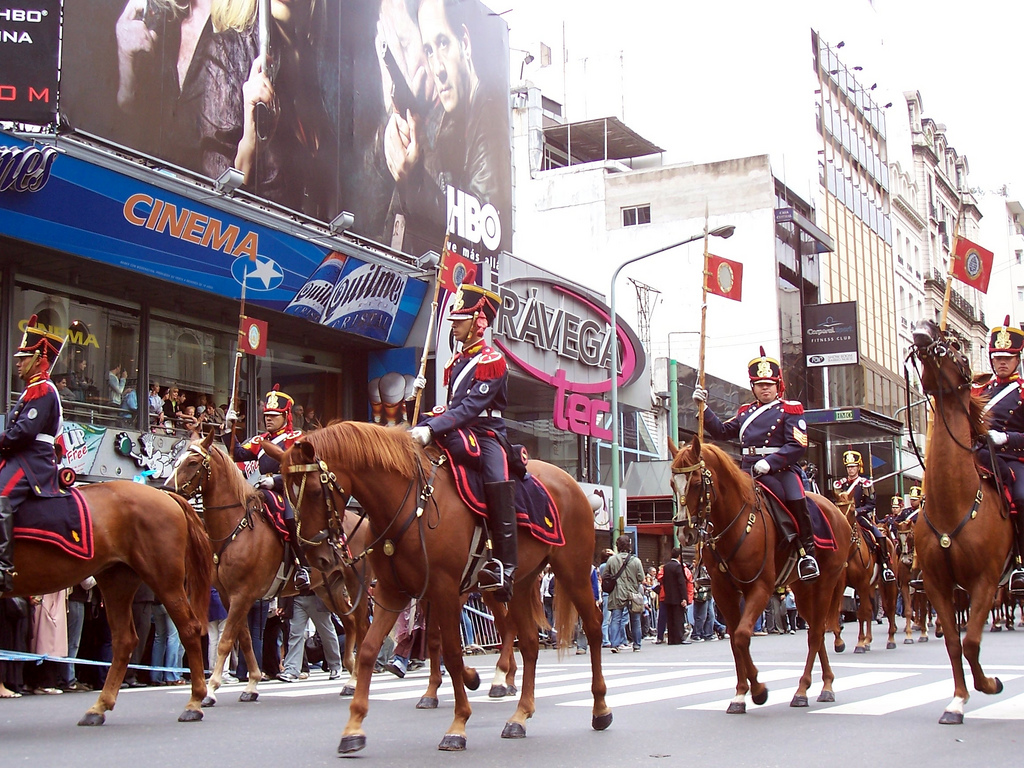
Procession in the Callao Avenue

The president Cristina Fernández de Kirchner was out of the country at the moment, and although she arranged an early return, she could not return to the country in time for the funeral. As a result, the vice president Julio Cobos arranged the state funeral of Alfonsín, alongside Eduardo Fellner (president of the Chamber of deputies) and José Pampuro (acting president of the Senate). His widow, former First Lady María Lorenza Barreneche, was unable to attend her husband's public state funeral due to her own declining health.

As a former Argentine president, his body was displayed at the Blue Hall of the Palace of the Argentine National Congress. He also set three days of national mourning, from March 31 to April 2. Daniel Scioli, governor of the Buenos Aires Province (birthplace of Alfonsín), also announced a provincial mourning. Almost a thousand people attended, and at some moments they sang the Argentine National Anthem.

The people were allowed to enter the Congress on April 1, 10:00. Initially, it was intended to keep the Congress open until 20:00, but the number of people attending it forced to delay it for the morning of April 2. The event was attended by the former presidents Carlos Menem, Fernando de la Rúa, Eduardo Duhalde and Néstor Kirchner, all the members of the Supreme Court of Argentina, mayor Mauricio Macri, governor Daniel Scioli, the president of Uruguay Tabaré Vázquez and several other politicians. The Congress was visited by almost 40,000 people. It was the largest state funeral in Argentina since the death of Juan Perón in 1974.

There was a ceremony afterwards with speeches from politicians from Alfonsín's tenure and from the Kirchner administration. The ceremony was aired in cadena nacional. It was followed by a mass given by José María Arancedo, archbishop of Santa Fe. Finally, a procession in the Callao Avenue with a military escort took the corpse to the La Recoleta Cemetery. People threw flowers to the coffin, flew Argentine and radical flags, and sung the national anthem. He was left in the pantheon for the veterans of the Revolution of the Park, until he got a special one for himself.

Twenty-two Argentine bishops at the Holy See held a mass for Alfonsín as well. It was at the Archbasilica of St. John Lateran, and was attended by the Argentine ambassador Juan Pablo Cafiero, the Italian monsignor Giuseppe Laterza and the Argentine monsignor Guillermo Karcher. The bishops met Pope Benedict XVI the following day.

== Reactions ==
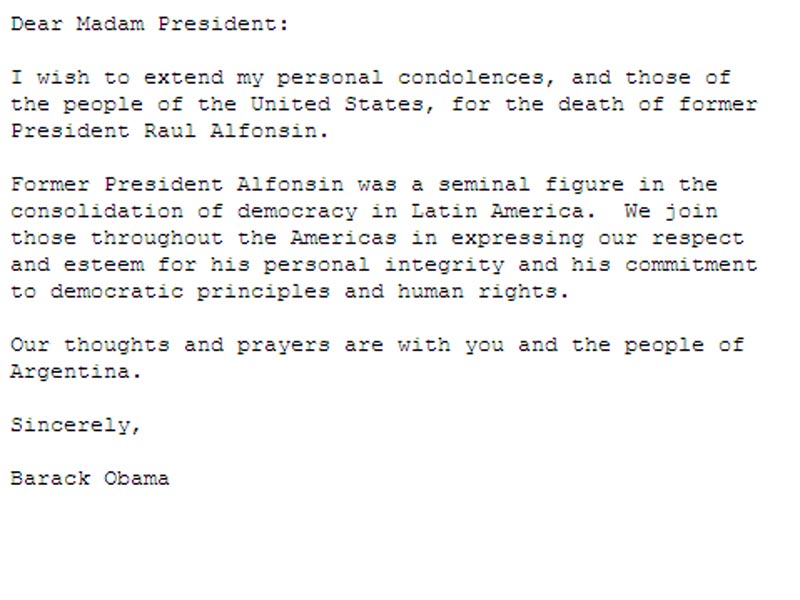
Message of condolences sent by Barack Obama, president of the United States

The living former presidents of Argentina sent their condolences for Alfonsín. Carlos Menem said that his death was a great loss for democracy. He also wrote an editorial for the La Nación newspaper, titled "Un viejo adversario saluda a un amigo" (Spanish: An old adversary salutes a friend), mirroring the famous quotation of the radical leader Ricardo Balbín during the funeral of Perón. Fernando de la Rúa said that "he fought all his life for politics and democracy. He raised up the values of democracy. Respect and affection were always present in him". Eduardo Duhalde described him as a family friend, and said Argentina lost a great man. Néstor Kirchner praised the trial of the Juntas. He also received condolences of José Sarney, Patricio Aylwin and Julio María Sanguinetti, contemporary presidents of Brazil, Chile and Uruguay. The governments of Brazil, Chile, Colombia, France, Mexico, Paraguay, Peru, Spain, United States and Uruguay also sent messages of condolences.

Ricardo López Murphy, minister of economy of president Fernando de la Rúa, said that Alfonsín was "the man who fought for our democracy and the strengthening of institutions, during a time of conflicts and polarizations that our society was merged into". Cristian Ritondo, legislator of the Republican Proposal, said that "Alfonsín was the main actor of the return of democracy to Argentina. He was a synonym of work, responsibility and patriotism". Gerardo Morales said that "when we were young in 1983 and sang 'we are life, we are peace', it was more than a slogan, it was a synthesis of our hopes: do not suffer more persecutions, live in democracy, in freedom and peace. We were part of the collective project led by Alfonsín". Elisa Carrió pointed that she had political disputes with him, but respected him nonetheless. Julio César Strassera, judge of the trial of the juntas, hoped that Alfonsín would be remembered as a great democrat. Daniel Scioli, governor of the Buenos Aires province, praised that he died with a complete peace of mind. Mauricio Macri, mayor of Buenos Aires, considered that he must have died in peace, after fulfilling his goals.
