= Alexis Guerrera =

Argentine lawyer and politician

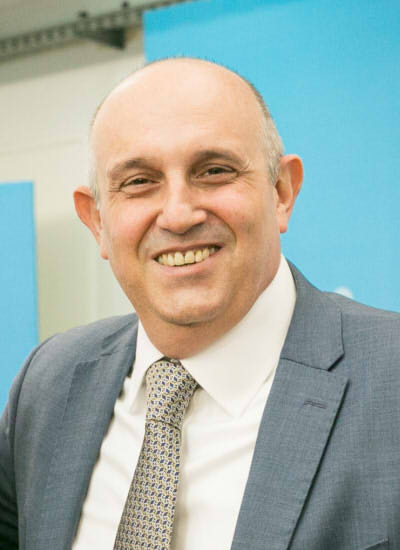

President of the Buenos Aires Province Chamber of Deputies
- Incumbent
- Assumed office 20 December 2023
- Vice President: Enrique Alejandro Dichiara
- Preceded by: Enrique Alejandro Dichiara

Provincial Deputy of Buenos Aires
- Incumbent
- Assumed office 10 December 2023
- Constituency: Fourth Electoral Section
- In office 10 December 2019 – 22 December 2020
- Constituency: Fourth Electoral Section

Minister of Transport
- In office 3 May 2021 – 29 November 2022
- President: Alberto Fernández
- Preceded by: Mario Meoni
- Succeeded by: Diego Giuliano

Mayor of General Pinto
- In office 10 December 2003 – 10 December 2019
- Preceded by: Luis Alberto Bruni
- Succeeded by: Jorge Alfredo Zavatarelli

Personal details
- Born: 2 February 1971 (age 55) General Pinto, Buenos Aires Province, Argentina
- Party: Justicialist Party (until 2016); Renewal Front (2016–present)
- Other political affiliations: Front for Victory (2003–2016); Frente de Todos (2019–2023); Union for the Homeland (2023–present)

Alexis Raúl Guerrera (Spanish pronunciation: [aˈleksis raˈul ɡeˈreɾa]; born 2 February 1971) is an Argentine teacher and politician. Since 2023, he has been a member of the Buenos Aires Province Chamber of Deputies, a position he previously held from 2019 to 2020. Since 2024 he has also served as the Chamber's president.

He was Minister of Transport of Argentina from 2021 to 2022, in the cabinet of President Alberto Fernández; he was appointed following the death of his predecessor, Mario Meoni, in a car accident on 23 April 2021.

Guerrera also previously served as intendente (mayor) of his hometown of General Pinto from 2003 to 2019, and as president of Trenes Argentinos Infraestructura, a state-owned subsidiary of Ferrocarriles Argentinos. A former member of the Justicialist Party and the Front for Victory, Guerrera joined the Renewal Front in 2016.

== Early life and career ==
Guerrera was born on 2 February 1971 in General Pinto, a partido in the North-west of Buenos Aires Province. In his youth he joined the Justicialist Party's Peronist Youth, becoming the secretary-general of the General Pinto Peronist Youth aged 25. He served as a member of the General Pinto city council and, in 2003, Guerrera became intendente (mayor) of General Pinto as a member of the Front for Victory coalition.

In 2016, Guerrera joined the Renewal Front led by Sergio Massa. In 2019, as a member of the newly formed Frente de Todos (of which the Renewal Front is part), Guerrera was elected as a member of the Buenos Aires Province Chamber of Deputies in the Fourth Electoral Section.

In 2020, Guerrera was appointed president of Trenes Argentinos Infraestructura (also known as ADIF, a state-owned train infrastructure company), succeeding Ricardo Lissalde. Following the death of Transport Minister Mario Meoni in a car accident on 23 April 2021, Guerrera was appointed as the new Minister of Transport of Argentina on 3 May 2021.

=== Minister of Transport ===
Guerrera has stated his opposition to the nationalization of the Paraná-Paraguay riverway.

In November 2022, Guerrera announced he would step down from his position in the ministry for health reasons. He was replaced by Diego Giuliano, also of the Renewal Front.

== Personal life ==
Guerrera is openly gay. During his first term as member of the Provincial Chamber of Deputies, Guerrera presided the parliamentary commission on gender and diversity and sponsored one of the province's anti-discrimination bills.

== Electoral history ==
=== Executive ===
Electoral history of Alexis Guerrera
Election	Office	List	Votes			Result	Ref.
Election	Office	List	Total	%	P.	Result	Ref.
2003	Mayor of General Pinto	Justicialist Party	3,209	52.20%	1st	Elected	
2007	Mayor of General Pinto	Front for Victory	3,998	62.14%	1st	Elected	
2011	Mayor of General Pinto	Front for Victory	4,697	71.02%	1st	Elected	
2015	Mayor of General Pinto	Front for Victory	4,354	66.78%	1st	Elected	

=== Legislative ===
Electoral history of Alexis Guerrera
Election	Office	List	#	District	Votes			Result	Ref.
Election	Office	List	#	District	Total	%	P.	Result	Ref.
2001	Councillor	Justicialist Party	1	General Pinto Partido	2,577	49.51%	1st (Note: Presented on an electoral list. The data shown represents the share of the vote the entire party/alliance received in that constituency.)	Elected	
2019	Provincial Deputy	Frente de Todos	5	Fourth Electoral Section	182,459	44.72%	2nd	Elected	
2023	Provincial Deputy	Union for the Homeland	3	Fourth Electoral Section	136,438	37.66%	1st	Elected	

Political offices
Preceded by Luis Alberto Bruni	Mayor of General Pinto; 2003–2019	Succeeded by Jorge Alfredo Zavatarelli
Preceded by Mario Meoni	Minister of Transport; 2021–2022	Succeeded by Diego Giuliano
Preceded by Enrique Alejandro Dichiara	President of the Buenos Aires Province Chamber of Deputies; 2024–present	Incumbent
