= Germania, Buenos Aires =

Germania
- Town
- Location within Buenos Aires Province
- Coordinates: 34°34′13″S 62°03′04″W
- Country: Argentina
- Province: Buenos Aires
- Partidos: General Pinto
- Established: August 15, 1905
- Elevation: 83 m (272 ft)

Population (2001 Census)
  - Total: 1,433
- Time zone: UTC−3 (ART)
- CPA Base: B 6053
- Climate: Dfc

Germania is a town located in the General Pinto Partido in the province of Buenos Aires, Argentina.

== Geography ==
Germania is located 429 km (267 mi) from the provincial capital of La Plata, and 30 km (19 mi) from the town of General Pinto.

== History ==
The land that would become Germania was originally the site of a ranch built in 1897. A train station would be built a decade later in 1905. Service was operated by the General San Martín Railway and service ran to the town of Chacabuco. The town was founded on August 15, 1905. Germania was primarily settled by immigrants from Europe. Rail service to the town ended in the 1970s. The town was surveyed in 1909, and the first school was built in 1911.

== Architecture ==
Most buildings in the town are European in style.

== Population ==
According to INDEC, which collects population data for the country, the town had a population of 1,433 people as of the 2001 census.
