= Hernán Maidana =

Argentine association football referee

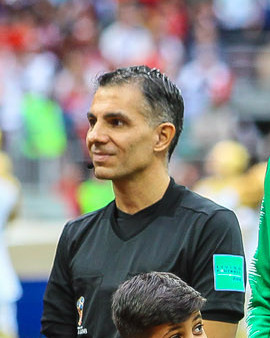
- Full name: Hernán Pablo Maidana
- Born: 14 February 1972 (age 54); General Pinto, Argentina

International
Years	League	Role
2007–2019	FIFA	Assistant referee

Hernán Maidana (born 14 February 1972) is an Argentine former assistant football referee. He officiated at three FIFA World Cups and was an assistant referee in the 2018 FIFA World Cup final between France and Croatia.

== Career ==
Maidana represented Argentina at a number of international tournaments. He took part in the football tournament at the 2008 Summer Olympics in Beijing and later worked at the 2010 FIFA World Cup in South Africa, where he was part of a refereeing team with Héctor Baldassi and Ricardo Casas.

At the 2014 FIFA World Cup in Brazil, Maidana served as an assistant to Néstor Pitana, alongside Juan Pablo Belatti. The Argentine team officiated four matches at the tournament, including the quarter-final between France and Germany.

Maidana, Pitana and Belatti also worked together at the 2015 Copa América in Chile. Their assignments included the opening match between Chile and Ecuador and the group-stage match between Colombia and Peru.

In 2016, Maidana returned to the Olympic Games for the football tournament in Rio de Janeiro. By that time, his international experience included two World Cups, two Olympic tournaments and the 2011 and 2015 editions of the Copa América.

His third World Cup came in 2018. Maidana and Belatti assisted Pitana in the opening match between Russia and Saudi Arabia at the Luzhniki Stadium in Moscow. The trio also officiated Mexico–Sweden, Croatia–Denmark and the quarter-final between Uruguay and France.

They were later appointed to the 2018 FIFA World Cup final between France and Croatia, also held at the Luzhniki Stadium. Maidana was the first assistant referee and Belatti the second. France won the match 4–2.
