= Redelén dos Santos =

Brazilian track and field athlete

Personal information
- Born: 24 April 1976 (age 50) São Paulo, Brazil

Sport
- Sport: Track and field
Medal record
Men's athletics
Representing Brazil
South American Championships
Gold medal – first place	2003 Barquisimeto	110 m hurdles
Gold medal – first place	2005 Cali	110 m hurdles
Silver medal – second place	2001 Manaus	110 m hurdles

Redelén Melo dos Santos (born 24 April 1976) is a Brazilian former track and field athlete who specialised in the 110 metres hurdles. His personal best of 13.29 seconds for the event is the South American record. He is a two-time South American Champion in the hurdles (2003 and 2005) and also won a silver medal in 2001.

He represented Brazil twice at both the World Championships in Athletics and the IAAF World Indoor Championships. He missed the 2004 Athens Olympics due to injury. In other competitions, he was fourth at the 2003 Pan American Games and won two silver medals at the Ibero-American Championships in Athletics. His time of 6.57 seconds for the seldom-held 50 metres hurdles is also a continental record mark.

== Career ==
His first international medal came at the age of 24 when he was the silver medallist at the 2000 Ibero-American Championships in Athletics in Rio de Janeiro. He improved his personal best time to 13.59 seconds that year and took second place at the Brazilian Championships. He made a breakthrough at continental level the year after with a runner-up finish behind his compatriot Márcio de Souza at the 2001 South American Championships in Athletics in Manaus. Later in the season he was a semi-finalist in the hurdles at the 2001 Summer Universiade. After a low-key 2002 he competed extensively in 2003, winning his first Brazilian title in June and then taking the gold medal at the 2003 South American Championships in Athletics a week later, breaking the championship record with a personal best run of 13.45 seconds. In August he recorded a time of 13.48 seconds to take fourth in the final at the 2003 Pan American Games, then made his first senior global appearance at the 2003 World Championships in Athletics, where he was a semi-finalist. Returning to his native São Paulo, he broke Márcio de Souza's South American record in September with a time of 13.34 seconds.

Dos Santos competed indoors for the first time in 2004 and managed to reach the semi-finals of the 60 metres hurdles at the 2004 IAAF World Indoor Championships. At the Grande Prêmio Brasil Caixa de Atletismo he improved his outdoor record by one hundredth of a second in May. He ran 13.30 seconds in Iriarte later that month, defended his national hurdles title in June, then became the first South American under 13.3 with his run of 13.29 seconds in Lisbon. Dos Santos continued to compete in Europe that summer and won at the Athens Grand Prix Tsiklitiria meet. He was selected for Brazil at the 2004 Summer Olympics, but an injury in the warm-up before the first heat led to his withdrawal from the competition.

Having recovered from injury, he returned in good form in 2005 and came third at the Doha Grand Prix with a run of 13.30 seconds. He was narrowly defeated by Mateus Inocêncio at the Brazilian Championships, but he beat all opposition at the 2005 South American Championships in Athletics to defend his continental title. Representing Brazil, he reached the semi-finals at the 2005 World Championships in Athletics and finished sixth in his race. He began 2006 with a South American indoor record of 6.57 seconds in the 50 metres hurdles, but was eliminated in the first round of the 60 m hurdles at the 2006 IAAF World Indoor Championships. For the second time in his career, he won a silver medal at the Ibero-American Championships. He ran a season's best of 13.69 seconds in August in São Paulo and this marked the start of a downturn in his career. He never ran under 14 seconds again in the seasons following this and was reduced to national level competition until his retirement in 2009.
