= Secretariat of Transport (Argentina) =

- Secretaría de Transporte
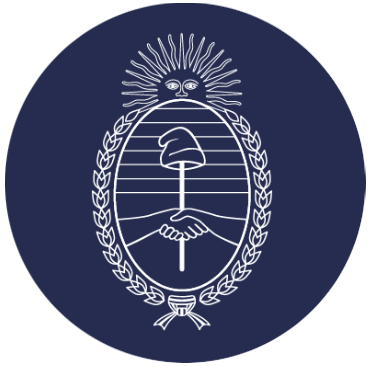

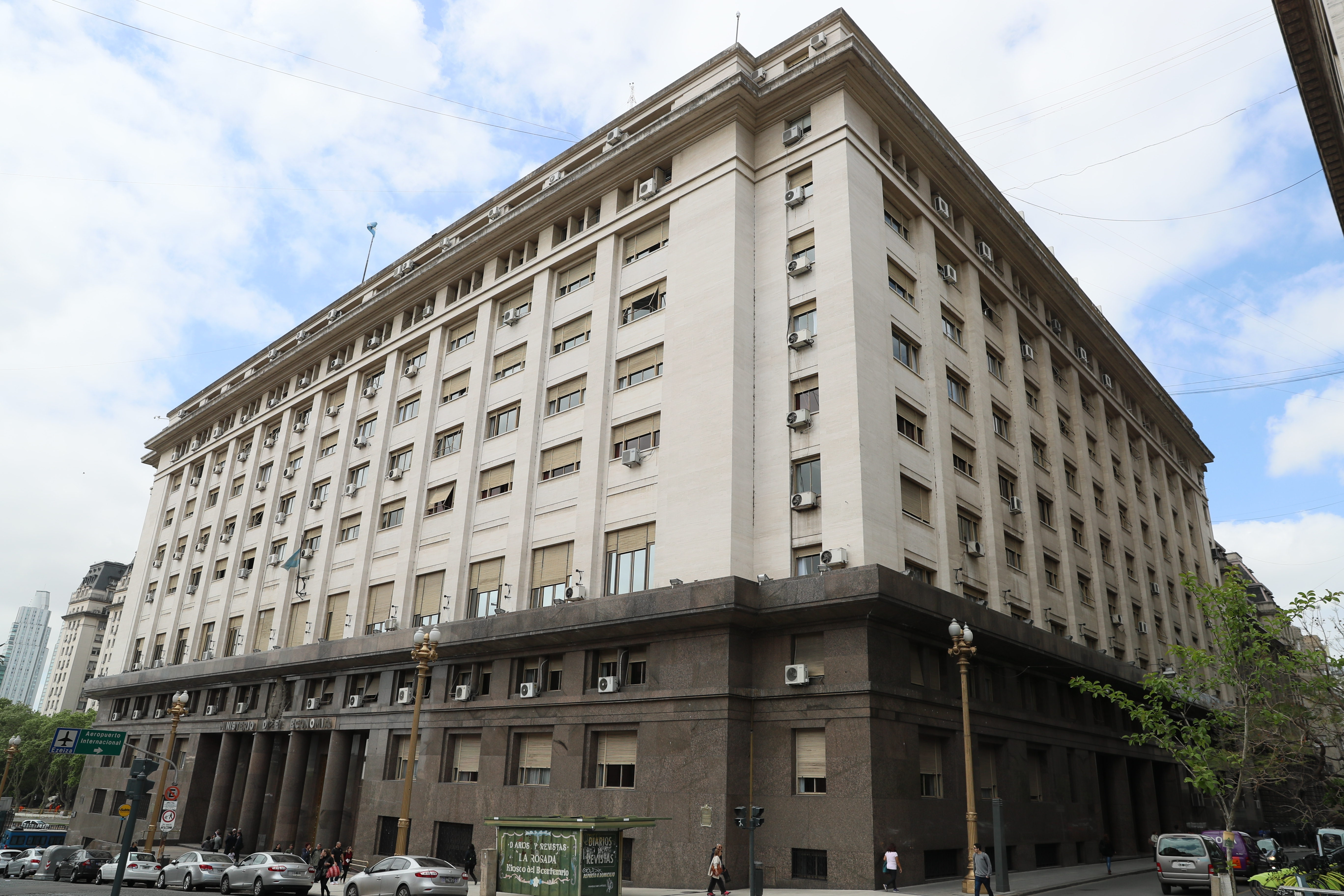
- Palacio de Hacienda, headquarters

Secretariat overview
- Formed: 1949; 77 years ago
- Superseding Secretariat: Ministry of Economy
- Jurisdiction: Government of Argentina
- Headquarters: Palacio de Hacienda, Buenos Aires
- Annual budget: $ 97,797,000 (2018)
- Secretariat executive: Franco Mogetta, Secretary
- Child agencies: ANAC; Ferrocarriles Argentinos SE; Aerolíneas Argentinas
- Website: argentina.gob.ar/transporte

The Secretariat of Transport (Spanish: Secretaría de Transporte, formerly, the Ministry of Transport) of Argentina is a national executive agency that managed transportation issues, including land, air, and sea transportation within the country.

The Ministry was founded in 1949 and was previously part of the Ministry of the Interior and Transport until 2015. The ministry was dissolved following a presidential decree from President Javier Milei, and turned into a Secretariat. It is controlled by the Ministry of Economy.

The Secretariat supervises several government agencies such as the National Road Safety Agency (ANSV), National Transport Regulation Commission (CNRT), National Civil Aviation Administration (ANAC), and transport companies such as Ferrocarriles Argentinos SE, and Aerolíneas Argentinas, among others.

== History ==
The first Ministry of Transport was formed in 1949 during the presidency of Juan Domingo Perón. The first minister responsible was army colonel Juan Francisco Castro, who was in office until 1952. During the governments of Eduardo Lonardi and Pedro Eugenio Aramburu, the Ministry of Transport was retained, but in 1958, it was downgraded to a secretariat under the Ministry of Public Works.

In 2012, during the presidency of Cristina Fernández de Kirchner, the Ministry of Transport became part of the Ministry of the Interior, which was renamed the Ministry of the Interior and Transport.. The presidency of Mauricio Macri saw the Transport portfolio upgraded to ministerial status once again; the first minister responsible this time was Guillermo Dietrich.

== Structure and dependencies ==
The Ministry of Transport counted with a number of centralized and decentralized dependencies. The centralized dependencies, as in other government ministers, were known as secretariats (secretarías) and undersecretariats (subsecretarías):

- Secretariat of Transport Management (Secretaría de Gestión de Transporte)
  - Undersecretariat of Rail Transport (Subsecretaría de Transporte Ferroviario)
  - Undersecretariat of Automotive Transport (Subsecretaría de Transporte Automotor)
  - Undersecretariat of Ports, Waterways and Merchant Navy (Subsecretaría de Puertos, Vías Navegables y Marina Mercante)
- Secretariat of Transport Planning (Secretaría de Planificación de Transporte)
  - Undersecretariat of Transport Planning and Coordination (Subsecretaría de Planificación y Coordinación de Transporte)
- Secretariat of Interjurisdictional Articulation (Secretaría de Articulación Interjurisdiccional)
  - Undersecretariat of Transport Economic and Financial Policy (Subsecretaría de Política Económica y Financiera de Transporte)
  - Undersecretariat of Strategic Projects and Technologic Development (Subsecretaría de Proyectos Estratégicos y Desarrollo Tecnológico)

Several decentralized agencies also reported to the Ministry of Transport, such as the National Road Safety Agency (ANSV), the National Transport Regulation Commission (CNRT), the Transport Safety Board, the National Civil Aviation Administration (ANAC), the Civil Aviation Accident Investigation Board, the National Airports System Regulatory Body (ORSNA), the Argentine National Transport Institute, and the General Ports Administration (AGP). Several state-owned enterprises were also overseen by the Ministry of Transport, such as Argentina's flag carrier Aerolíneas Argentinas, Operadora Ferroviaria S.E., Ferrocarriles Argentinos, ADIFSE, and Trenes Argentinos Cargas.

== Headquarters ==
The Secretariat of Transport is headquartered in the Palacio de Hacienda in Buenos Aires, which had also been the headquarters of other ministries, including the Ministries of the Treasury, Public Works, and Production.

The Ministry's headquarters was built in two stages between 1937 and 1950 and is located on Hipólito Yrigoyen street, across from the Casa Rosada and Plaza de Mayo.

== List of ministers and secretaries ==
No.	Minister	Party	Term	President
Ministry of Transport (1949–1958)
1	Juan Francisco Castro	Peronist Party	11 March 1949 – 4 June 1952	Juan Domingo Perón
2	Juan Eugenio Maggi	Peronist Party	4 June 1952 – 29 June 1955	Juan Domingo Perón
3	Alberto Iturbe	Peronist Party	30 June 1955 – 21 September 1955	Juan Domingo Perón
4	Juan José Uranga	Independent (Military)	23 September 1955 – 13 November 1955	Eduardo Lonardi
5	Sadi Bonnet	Independent (Military)	13 November 1955 – 1 May 1958	Pedro Eugenio Aramburu
Ministry of the Interior and Transport (2012–2015)
6	Florencio Randazzo	Justicialist Party	6 June 2012 – 10 December 2015	Cristina Fernández de Kirchner
Ministry of Transport (2015–2023)
7	Guillermo Dietrich	Republican Proposal	10 December 2015 – 10 December 2019	Mauricio Macri
8	Mario Meoni	Renewal Front	10 December 2019 – 23 April 2021	Alberto Fernández
9	Alexis Guerrera	Renewal Front	3 May 2021 – 29 November 2022	Alberto Fernández
10	Diego Giuliano	Renewal Front	29 November 2022 – 10 December 2023	Alberto Fernández
Secretary of Transport (2023–)
11	Franco Mogetta	Unidos por Córdoba	Dec 2023 – present	Javier Milei
