= Chascomús =

City in Buenos Aires Province, Argentina

- City
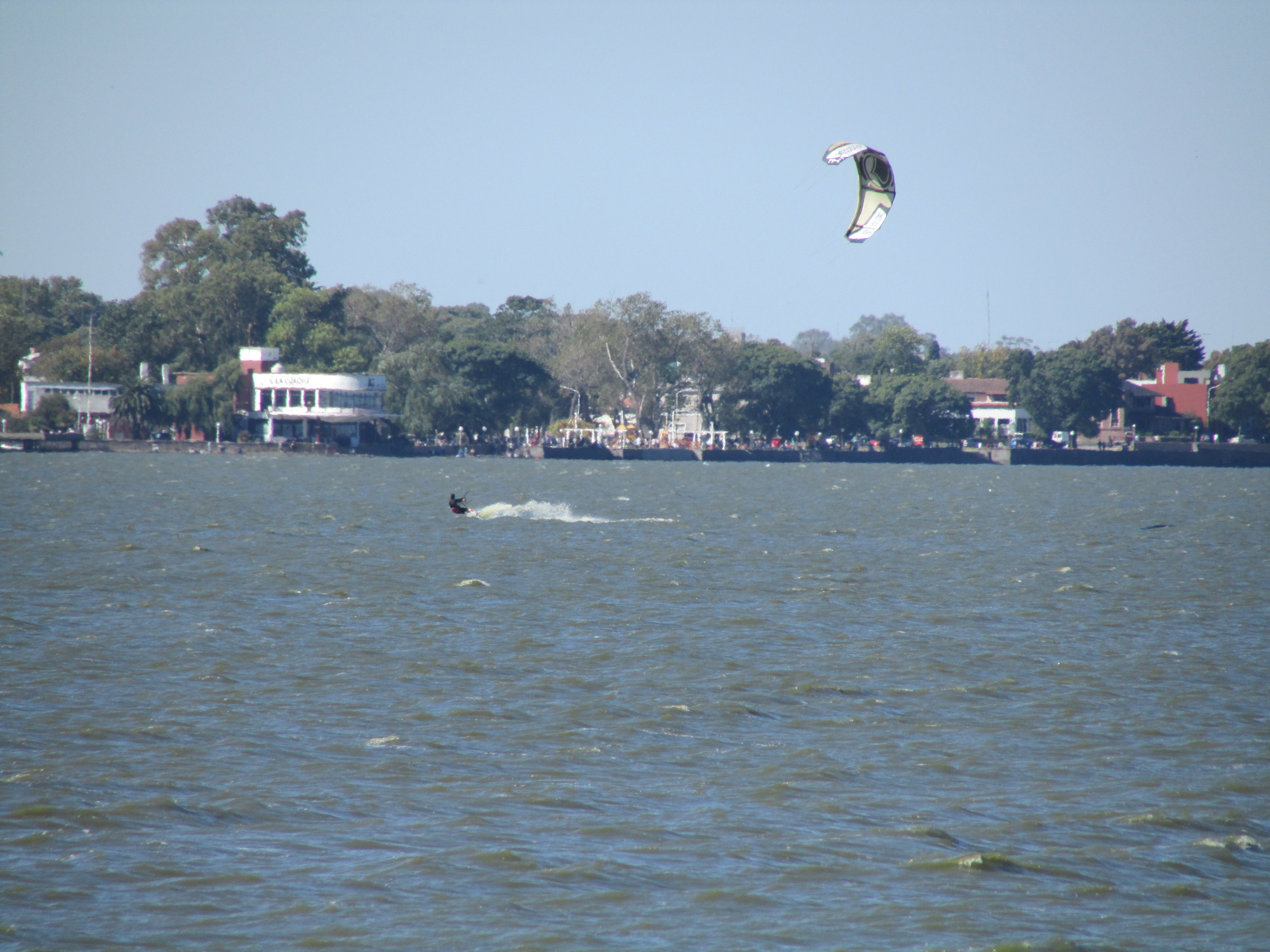
- Chascomús Lake

- Location in Argentina Chascomús (Argentina)
- Coordinates: 35°34′30″S 58°00′32″W
- Country: Argentina
- Province: Buenos Aires
- Partido: Chascomús
- Intendant: Javier "Chapa" Gaston
- Founded: May 30, 1779
- Elevation: 16 m (52 ft)

Population (2010 census)
  - Total: 33,607
- CPA Base: B 7130
- Area code: +54 2241

Chascomús is the principal city in Chascomús Partido in eastern Buenos Aires Province of Argentina, located 123 km (76 mi) south of the capital Buenos Aires. In 2001, the city had a population of 30,670.

The name comes from Guaraní but has an uncertain meaning perhaps simply -the area with the lagoons.

== History ==
The city was founded as a fort (the Fortín de San Juan Bautista) on May 30, 1779, by Captain Pedro Nicolás Escribano, head of the Blandengues Cavalry. The city was the site of an 1839 rebellion against the dictatorial regime of Governor Juan Manuel de Rosas; the uprising, known as the Libres del Sur ("Freemen of the South") ended in defeat following a battle on November 7. The Buenos Aires Great Southern Railway line arrived at the town in 1865, and Chascomús was recognized as a city and department by the Provincial Legislature in 1873.

== Notable people ==
Former Argentine President Raúl Alfonsín and his wife, former First Lady María Lorenza Barreneche, and their son Ricardo Alfonsín were all born in the city. Other natives include the interim military President Alfredo Oscar Saint Jean, professional tennis player Carlos Berlocq, 2020 world champion of poker Damian Salas, as well as the cyclists Juan José Haedo and Lucas Sebastián Haedo.

== Gallery ==
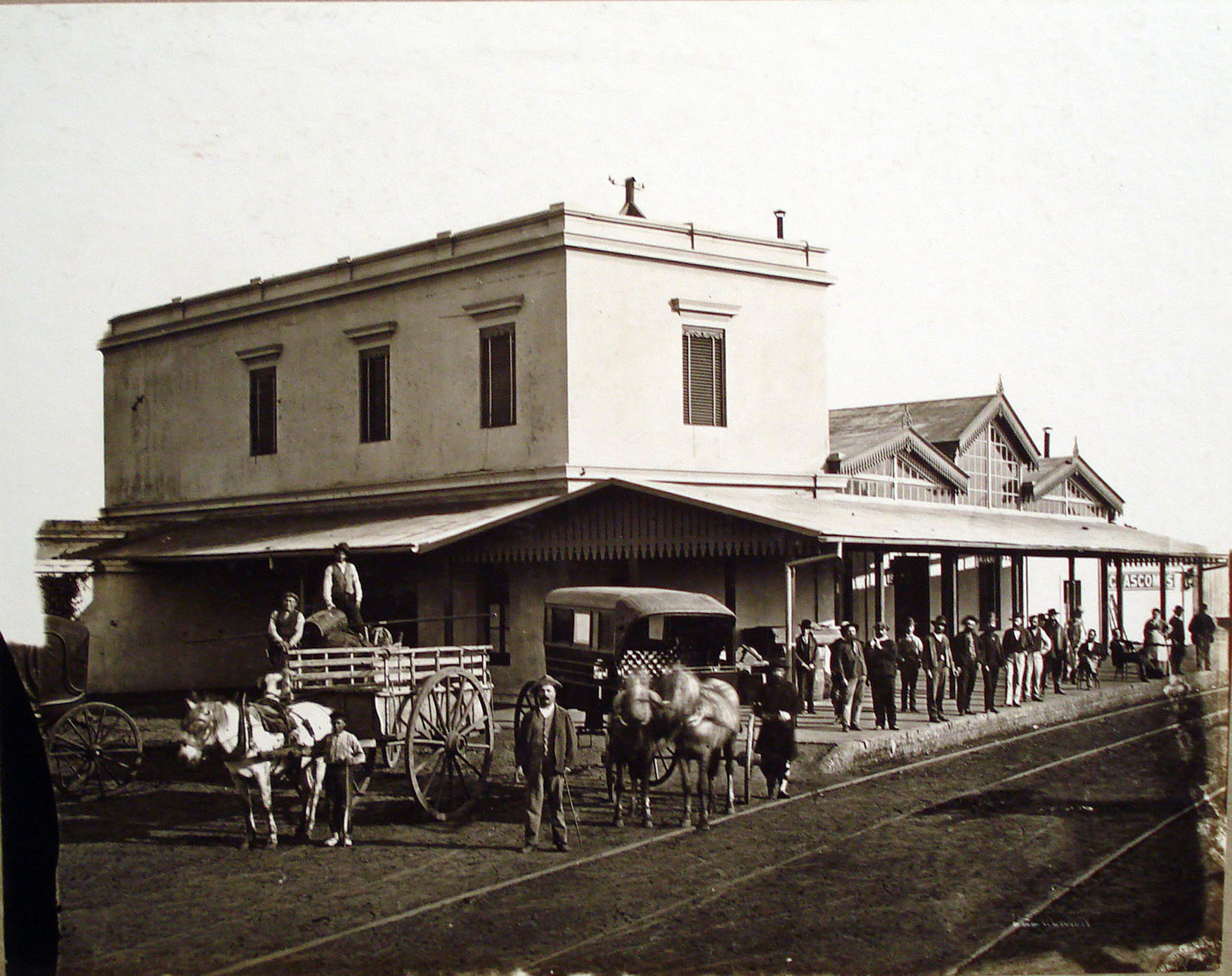
Railway station (1875)

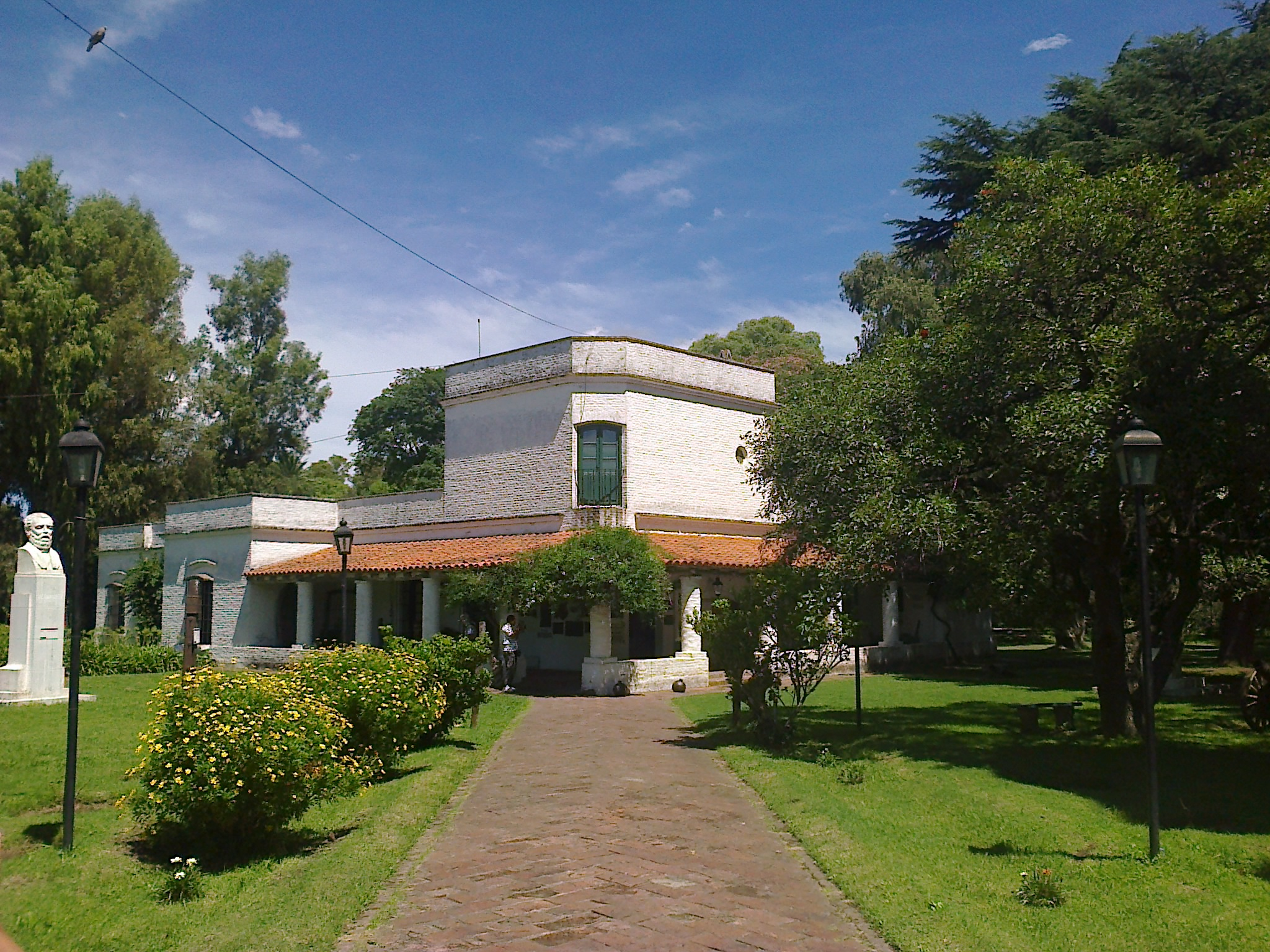
Museo Pampeano

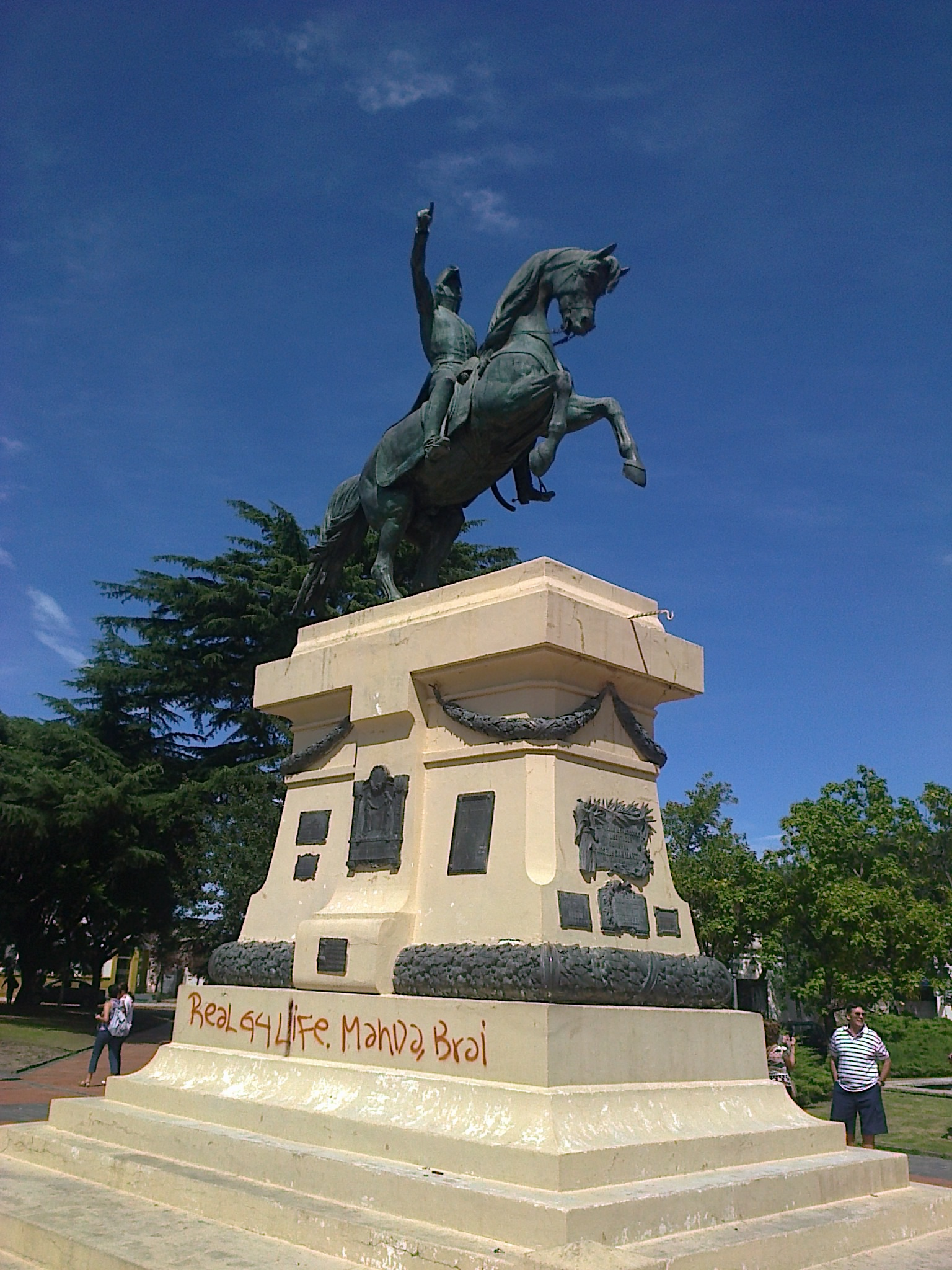
Statue of José de San Martín

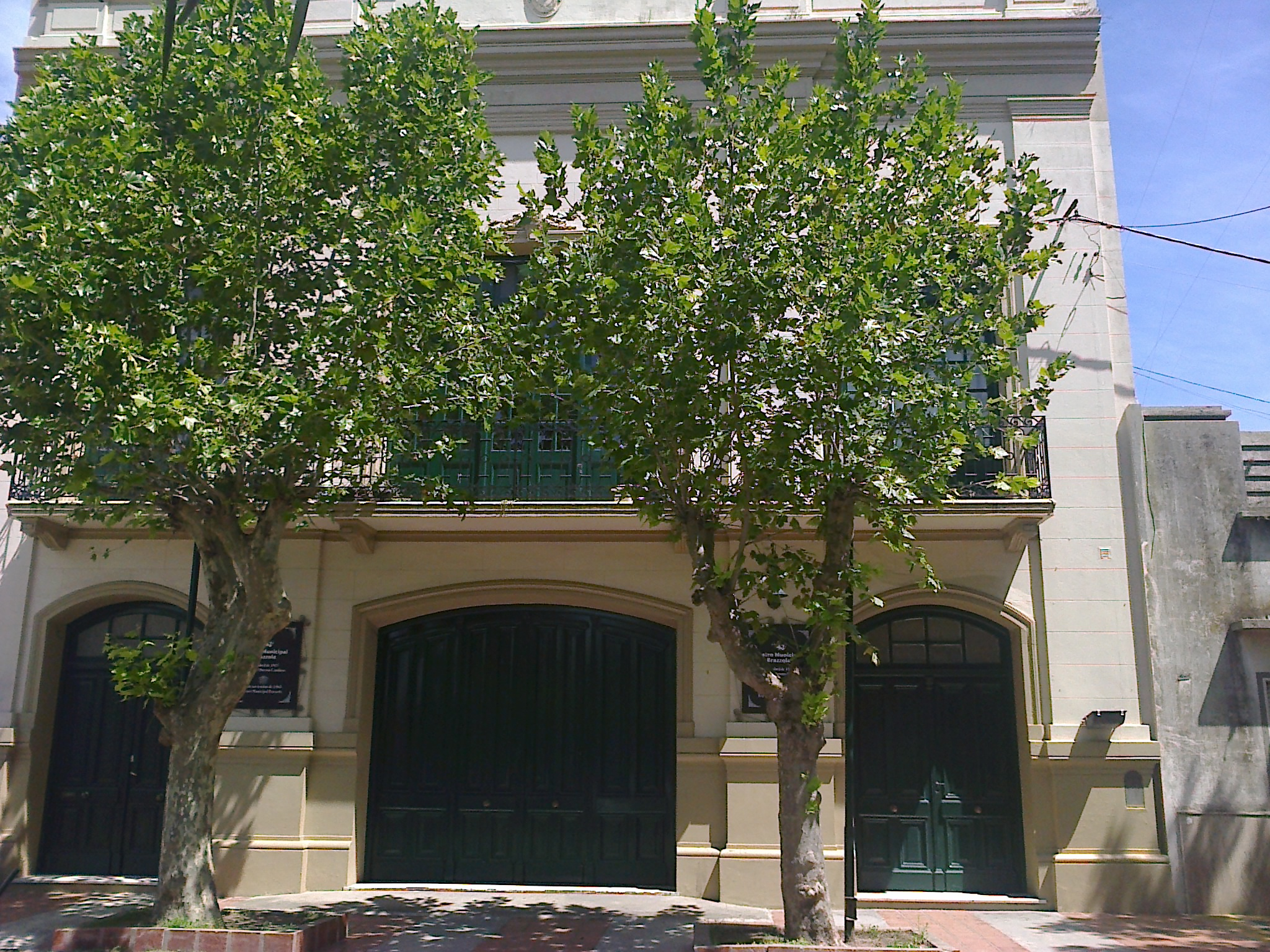
Theater

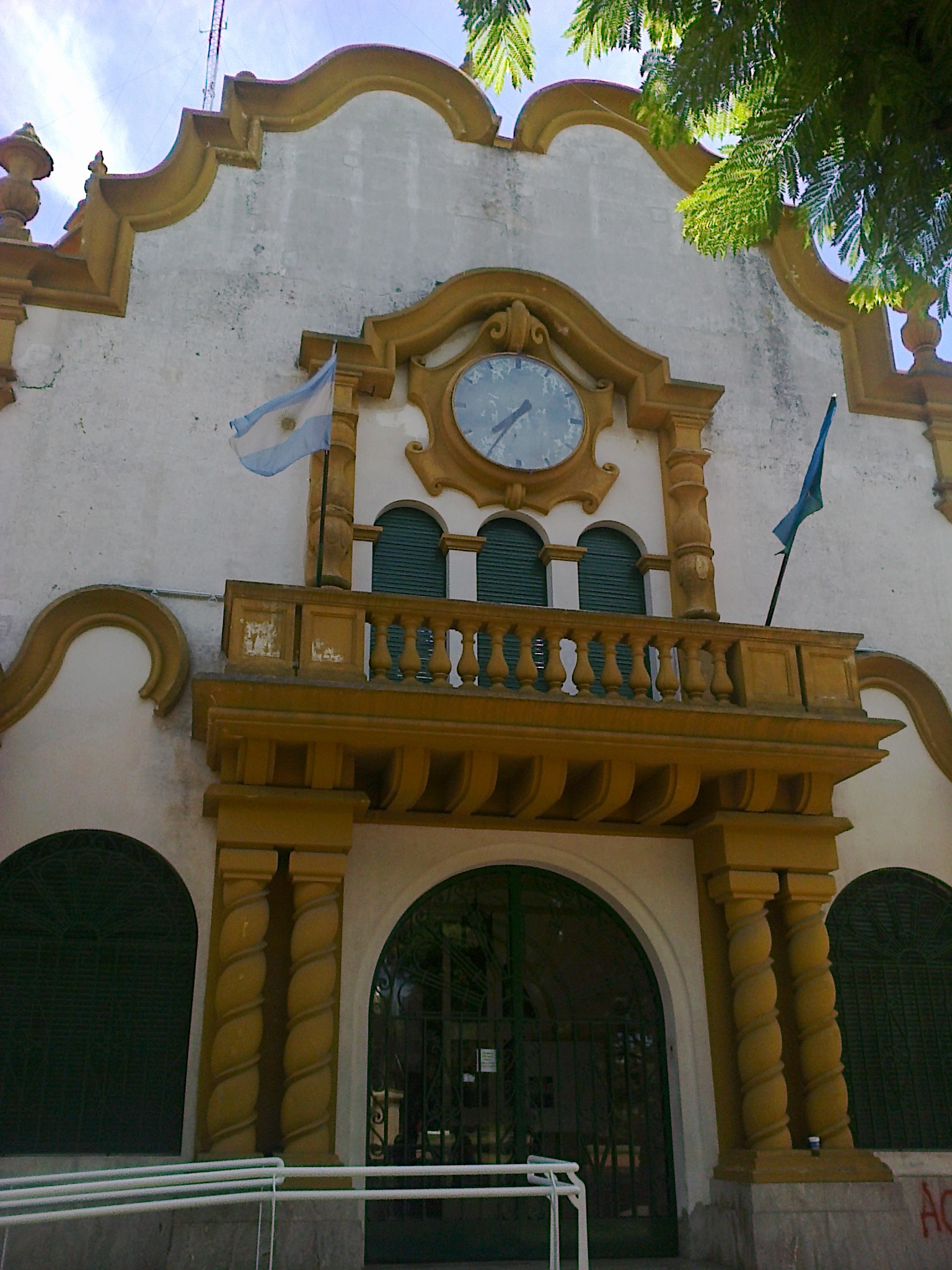
Municipality

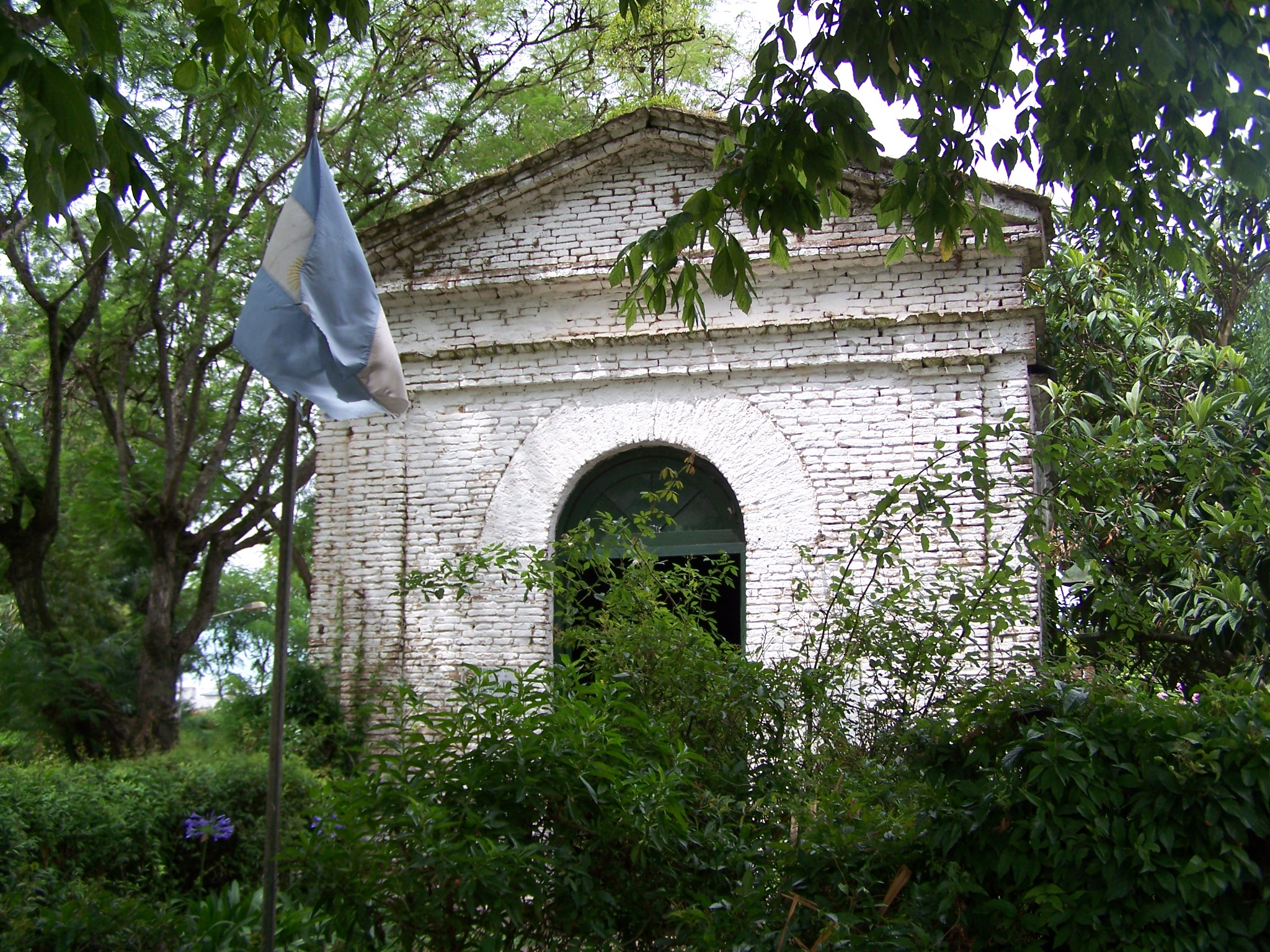
Capilla de los Negros

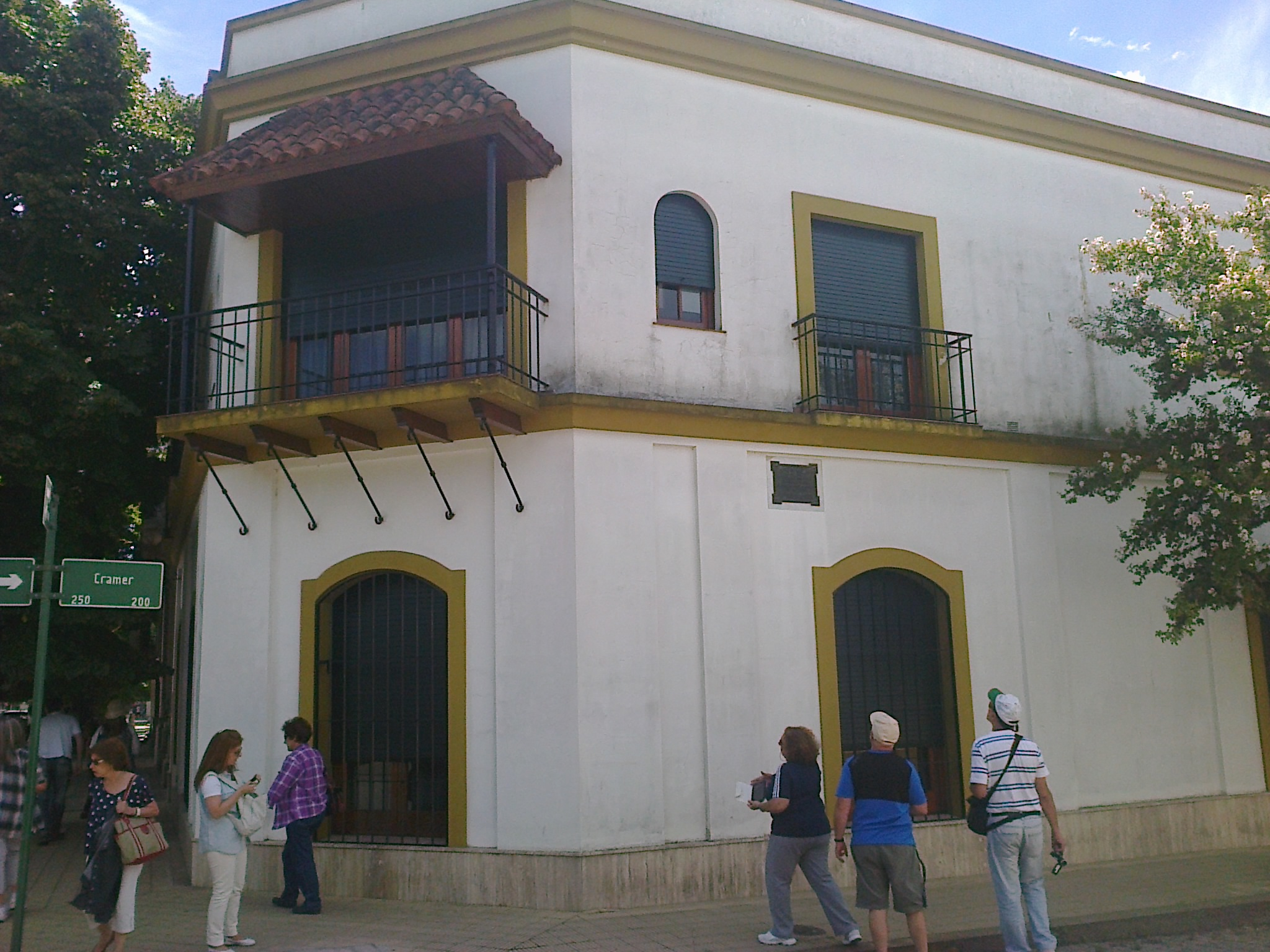
Raúl Alfonsín's house

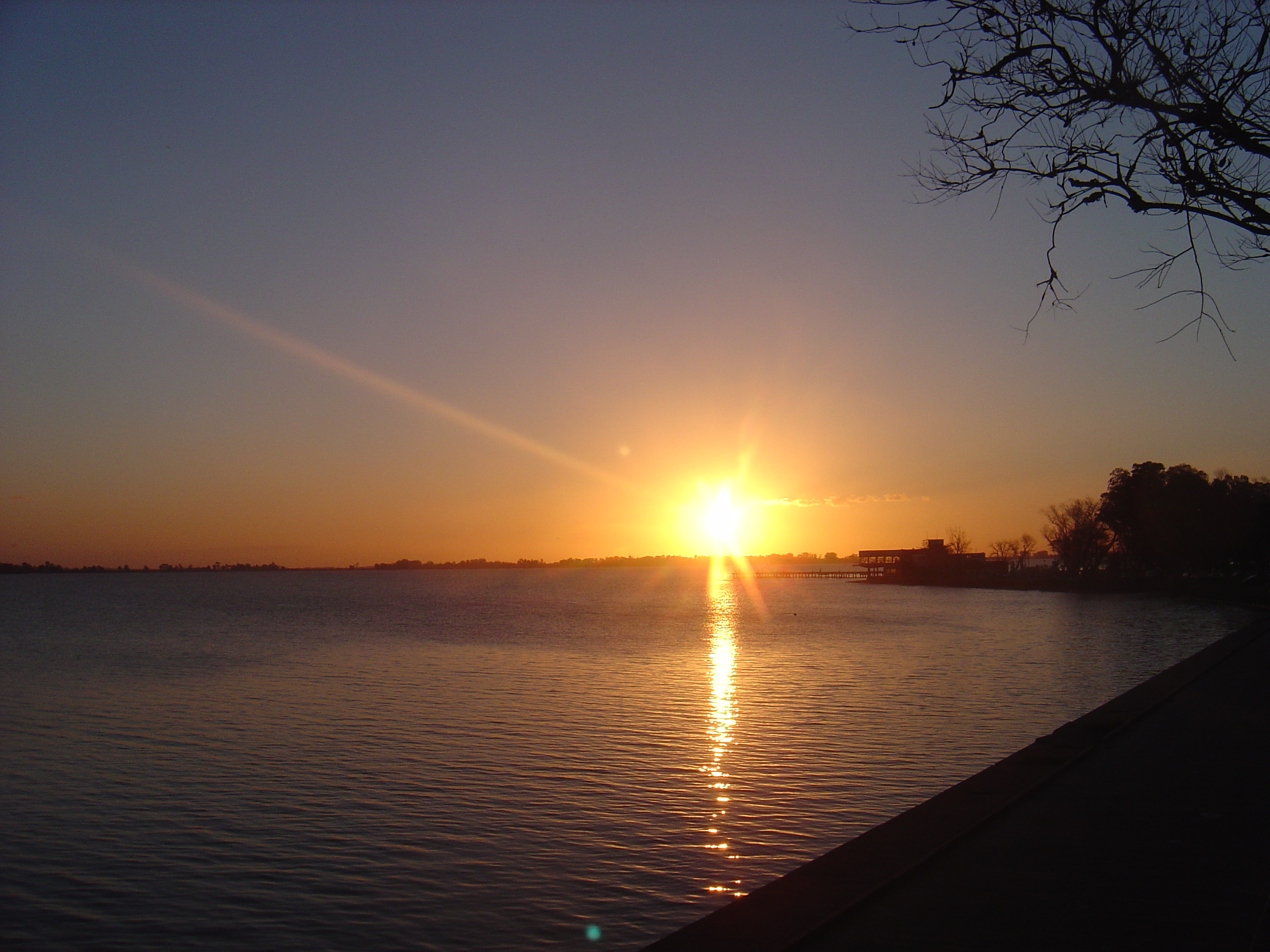
Lake at nightfall

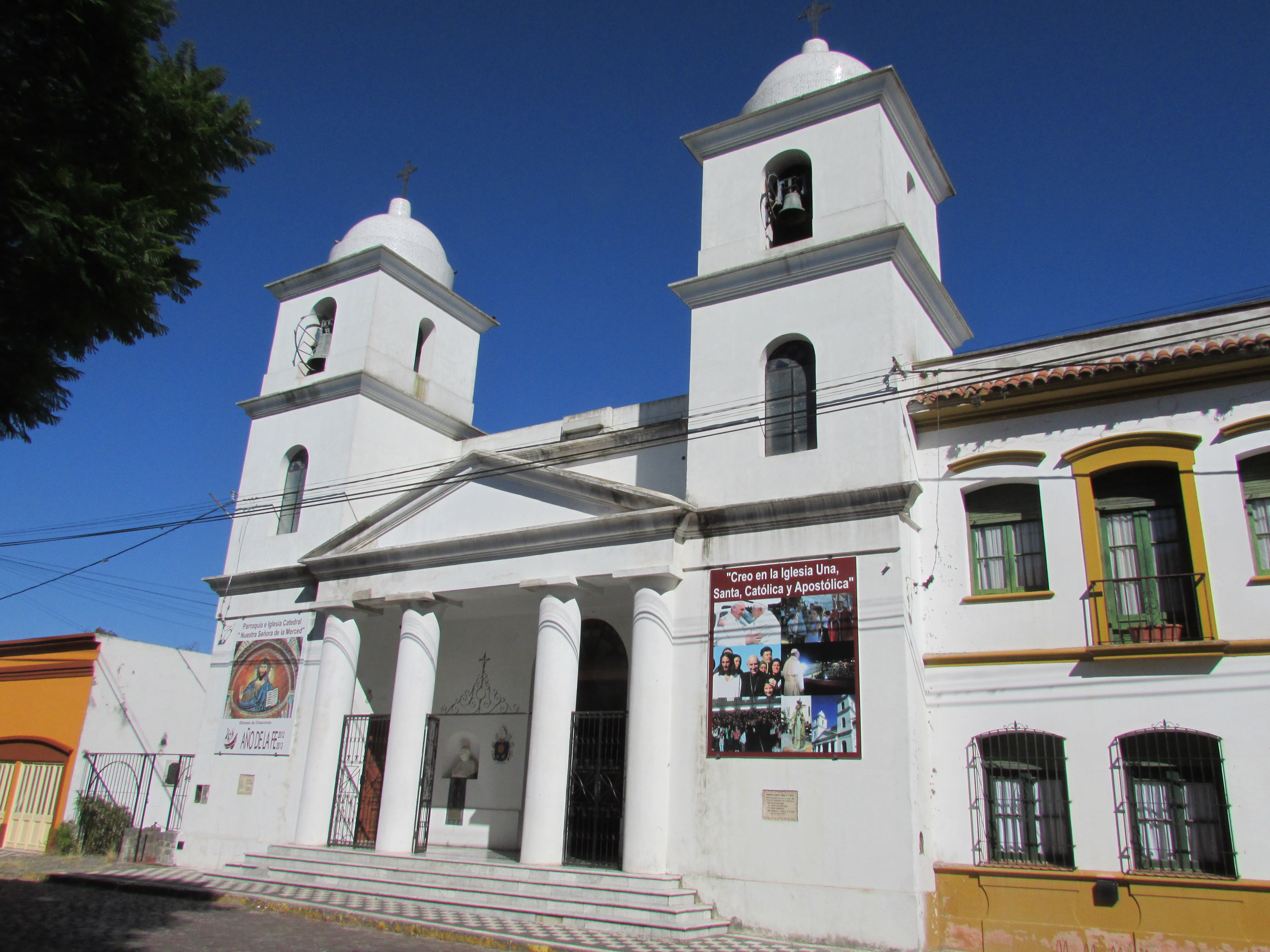
Cathedral
