= Ricardo Alfonsín =

Argentine politician

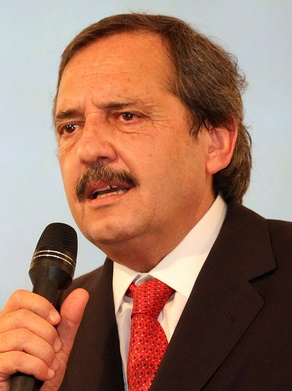

Argentine Ambassador to Spain
- In office 31 August 2020 – 10 December 2023
- Nominated by: Alberto Fernández
- Preceded by: Ramón Puerta

National Deputy
- In office 10 December 2009 – 10 December 2017
- Constituency: Buenos Aires

Provincial Deputy of Buenos Aires
- In office 10 December 1999 – 10 December 2003
- Constituency: Fifth Electoral Section

Personal details
- Born: Ricardo Luis Alfonsín; 2 November 1953 (age 72) Chascomús, Argentina
- Party: Radical Civic Union
- Other political affiliations: Broad Progressive Front (2011–2013); Broad Front UNEN (2013–2015); Cambiemos (2015–2019); Frente de Todos (2020–2023); Union for the Homeland (2023)
- Spouse: Cecilia Plorutti
- Parents: Raúl Alfonsín (father); María Lorenza Barreneche (mother)
- Education: University of Buenos Aires
- Profession: Lawyer

Ricardo Luis Alfonsín (born 2 November 1953) is an Argentine lawyer, academic and politician prominent in the Radical Civic Union. His father, Raúl Alfonsín, was the President of Argentina from 1983 to 1989. He was Argentina's ambassador to Spain from 2020 to 2023.

== Early life and education ==
Ricardo Luis Alfonsín was born in Chascomús son of María Lorenza Barreneche and Raúl Alfonsín; the latter was at the time a local lawyer and councilman active in the centrist Radical Civic Union (UCR). Ricardo Alfonsín earned a degree in education at the Chascomús Teachers College, and taught civics in local secondary schools, later earning a law degree at the University of Buenos Aires.

He married Cecilia Plorutti, and the couple had four children during the 1980s; though his father had been elected president in 1983, they avoided involvement in politics at the time.

== Political career ==
He first actively entered politics in 1993, and was elected delegate to the UCR leadership convention, during which his father was returned to the party's presidency after being turned out in 1991. He first rose to elected office in 1999, as a Buenos Aires Provincial Deputy, and remained in the post until 2003. The UCR in tatters following the 2001 resignation of President Fernando de la Rúa, Alfonsín was named head of the party's foreign policy office following the end of his term in the legislature.

On 7 September 2004, his youngest daughter, Amparo, suffered a deep cut from broken glass at the parochial school she attended in Buenos Aires, and lost her life at age 15. The tragedy led Alfonsín to retire from politics for a time, though in 2007, he made a surprise bid for the office of Governor of Buenos Aires Province, naming veteran actor Luis Brandoni as his running mate. The move was unconventional because the UCR, on which ticket he ran, had endorsed independent candidate Roberto Lavagna in the 2007 presidential race, and Lavagna, in turn, backed Congressman Jorge Sarghini for governor. Ultimately, none of the three won their respective races.

Alfonsín lost his father on 31 March 2009, when three days of national mourning were declared. A month earlier, he formed an alliance with former fellow UCR lawmaker Margarita Stolbizer (who had established her own party, GEN) and accepted the second spot in the GEN/UCR party list ahead of the 28 June 2009 mid-term elections. The list came in third in the Province of Buenos Aires, though it secured enough votes to elect both to the Lower House of Congress, where they would be seated on 10 December. As part of a compromise with the ruling Front for Victory caucus (representing Kirchnerism), the latter would retain the Presidency of the Lower House, and Alfonsín was elected 1st Vice President of the body on 4 December.

Alfonsín clinched his party's nomination for the 2011 presidential elections when Senator Ernesto Sanz withdrew on 28 April. The Civic and Social Agreement alliance with GEN and the Socialist Party was broken in June, so he endorsed the Federal Peronism candidate Francisco de Narváez for Governor of Buenos Aires and appointed former Central Bank President Javier González Fraga as running mate. They placed third with 11% of the vote.

On 8 September 2014, his list 27 won in internal elections the leadership of the Buenos Aires radicalism after triumphing against Daniel Salvador's 2015 list from 59.01% to 40.99% (Salvador had already held the presidency of the Provincial Committee UCR 2008-2010). After the victory Alfonsín announced that he would resist the agreement with the PRO since he wanted to maintain the Frente Amplio UNEN. Between 2014 and 2016 he was accompanied on the Committee: Héctor Luis Baldo as vice president, Ricardo Sánchez as general secretary and Graciela San Martín as treasurer.

In August 2020, he was appointed as ambassador to Spain and joined the ruling Frente de Todos coalition. His accreditation is extended to Andorra in February 2021.
