= Osvaldo Mércuri =

Argentine politician (died 2021)

President of the Buenos Aires Province Chamber of Deputies
- In office 7 December 2001 – 10 December 2005
- Preceded by: Aldo San Pedro
- Succeeded by: Ismael Pasaglia
- In office 8 December 1989 – 7 December 1997
- Preceded by: Luis Rodolfo Almar
- Succeeded by: Francisco José Ferro

Provincial Deputy of Buenos Aires
- In office 10 December 1985 – 10 December 2005
- Constituency: Third Electoral Section

Personal details
- Born: 1944 or 1945 Lomas de Zamora, Argentina
- Died: 6 February 2021 (aged 76) San Isidro, Buenos Aires Province, Argentina
- Party: Justicialist Party
- Spouse: Maria Elena

Osvaldo Mércuri (1944/1945 – 6 February 2021) was an Argentine politician, based in Buenos Aires Province, and member of the Justicialist Party. He was a longtime member of the Buenos Aires Province Chamber of Deputies from 1985 to 2005. This included two tenures as the President of the Buenos Aires Province Chamber of Deputies: 7 December 1989, to 8 December 1997, and again from 7 December 2001, until 10 December 2005. Mércuri also chaired the national 1994 Constitutional Reform Convention and the Justicialist Party conference.

== Biography ==
Mércuri was born in Lomas de Zamora, Buenos Aires Province, Argentina.

At the time of his death, Mércuri was serving as a member of the Mercosur Parliament (Parlasur). His term in Parlasaur was scheduled to expire on 31 December 2021.

Mércuri died from COVID-19 at a hospital in San Isidro, Buenos Aires Province, where he had been hospitalized for three weeks, on 6 February 2021, at the age of 76. He was survived by his wife, Maria Elena, and their children. Former President of Argentina Eduardo Duhalde, a friend and close political ally, paid tribute to Mércuri on Twitter following his death.
