= Horacio Ramiro González =

Argentine politician

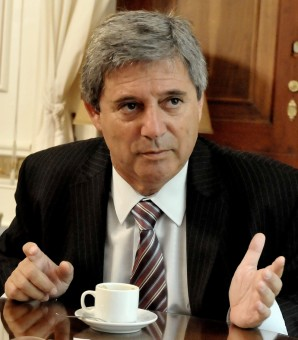

President of the Buenos Aires Province Chamber of Deputies
- In office 10 December 2007 – 10 December 2015
- Preceded by: Ismael Passaglia
- Succeeded by: Jorge Sarghini

Personal details
- Born: 7 August 1956 (age 69) Buenos Aires Province
- Party: Front for Victory
- Profession: Certified Public Accountant

Horacio Ramiro González (born 7 August 1956) is an Argentine politician. From 2007 to 2015 he was president of the Chamber of Deputies of Buenos Aires Province.

== Biography ==
He enrolled at the University of Morón and graduated as Certified Public Accountant.

== Political career ==
In 1995 he was elected councilman at Ituzaingó district of the Province of Buenos Aires. By choice of his peers he was elected president of the Deliberative Council, a position he held from 1995 to 1999.

In 1999 he was elected deputy for the Province of Buenos Aires, representing the first electoral section, a position he held for four years.

In 2003 he was elected provincial deputy again for a further period of four years, being appointed by his peers as vice president of the Chamber of Deputies of the Province of Buenos Aires.

In the year 2007 is elected provincial deputy again for another four years and elected by his peers as president of the Chamber of Deputies of Buenos Aires Province, the highest authority of the institution.

In December 2009 he was again elected president of the Chamber of Deputies of Buenos Aires Province unanimously by the entire Legislature.

== Recognitions ==
On November 12, 2009 he received from the Government of Portugal the Order of Infante Dom Henrique in the Grade of Commander, in recognition of his civic and political work.
In addition, in July 2010 he was distinguished by the Bishop of the Diocese of Zárate-Campana, Oscar Sarlinga in recognition of his "Christian attitude and his work in social charity"

== Party Activity ==
In the area of party activity, he is provincial and national elector for Justicialist Party.
