= Guillermo Dietrich =

Argentine economist and politician

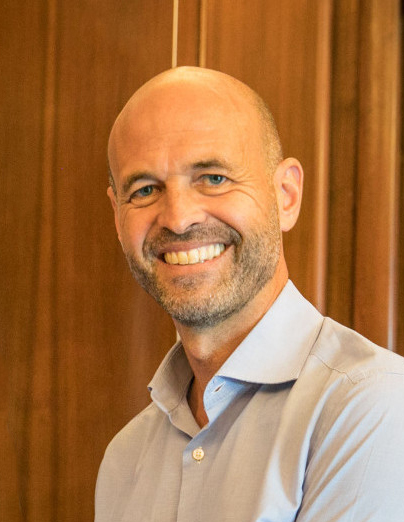

Minister of Transport
- In office 10 December 2015 – 10 December 2019
- President: Mauricio Macri
- Preceded by: Florencio Randazzo
- Succeeded by: Mario Meoni

Personal details
- Born: 5 March 1969 (age 57) Buenos Aires, Argentina
- Party: Republican Proposal
- Other political affiliations: Cambiemos (2015–present)
- Education: Pontifical Catholic University of Argentina

Guillermo Dietrich (born March 5, 1969) is an Argentine economist and politician. He served as the Minister of Transport of Argentina in the Mauricio Macri cabinet from 2015 to 2019.

== Life and education ==
Guillermo Dietrich was born in Buenos Aires, Argentina of German descent. He received a degree in economics from the Pontifical Catholic University of Argentina in 1993 with a postgraduate degree in negotiation and an MBA magna cum laude from the IAE Business School of Austral University.

He led the Dietrich Company, an automotive retailer founded by his father, Guillermo Dietrich Sr. in 1964. undertook various businesses related to the automotive industry and technology.

== Politics ==
He is founder and leader of G25 along with Esteban Bullrich, of the Republican Proposal (PRO) created in 2008 and is a member of the board of directors of Fundación Pensar belonging to PRO.

In 2009, he was named head of Transport and Transit by Mayor Mauricio Macri, where he developed the Metrobús system of lanes for collectives suspected and investigated for surcharges.

At the end of November 2015, Mauricio Macri, as President-elect of Argentina, appointed him to head the Ministry of Transport.

== Ministry of Transport ==
He promoted the "Revolution of the airplanes": the takeoff of the low cost market, the modernization of airports and connections were added. Therefore, 2018 was the best year in history for flights with 29.1 million passengers.

In 2017 the Rosario Metrobus was inaugurated, becoming the first metrobus in the interior of the country.

During its management the underground of the Sarmiento Railroad was reactivated, with the participation of Odebrecht and IECSA.

== Personal life ==
He is married to Javiera Álvarez Echagüe and is the father of two children.
