= Diego Giuliano =

Politician in Argentina

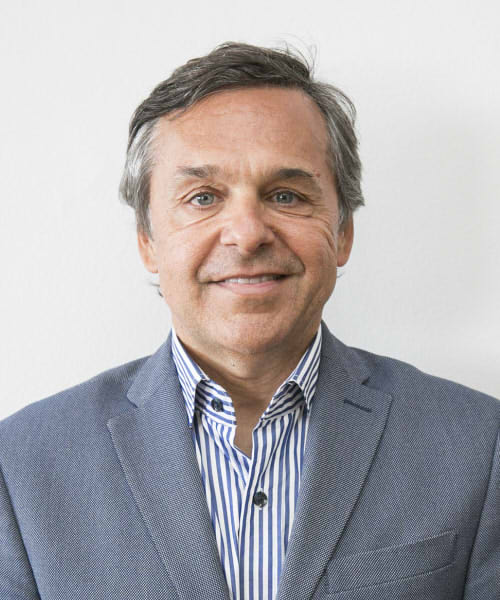

National Deputy
- Incumbent
- Assumed office 10 December 2023
- Constituency: Santa Fe

Minister of Transport
- In office 29 November 2022 – 8 December 2023
- President: Alberto Fernandez
- Preceded by: Alexis Guerrera
- Succeeded by: Office disestablished

Personal details
- Born: 14 January 1965 (age 61) Rosario, Argentina
- Party: Renewal Front; Union for the Homeland
- Occupation: Lawyer and professor

Diego Alberto Giuliano (Spanish pronunciation: [ˈdjeɣo alˈβeɾto ʝuˈljano]; born 14 January 1965) is an Argentine politician who is a member of the Chamber of Deputies of Argentina. Previously, he served as Minister of Transport designated by President Alberto Fernández between 2022 and 2024.

Since 2024 he is president of the Renewal Front.

== Biography ==
He was born in Rosario. He earned the degree of Lawyer at the National University of Rosario and then a specialization on Constitutional Law on the Pontifical Catholic University of Argentina. He worker as professor on the National University of Rosario.

Initially, he started his first steps in the public sector on the Peronist provincial government of Santa Fe as an advisor until his election as member of the city council of Rosario in 2007 as member of a local party, he was re-elected in 2013 and was part of the council until 2017. During that time he started supporting the new Renewal Front of Sergio Massa.

With Alexis Guerrera as Minister of Transport, he was designated as Deputy Director of the National Commission of Transport Regulation in 2020. As Minister of Transport he wanted to create a system of self-renounce to public founds for train and bus tickets in the middle of the presidential campaign of Massa in 2023, an action which was criticized as part of a government program to create fear to the voters of Javier Milei.

In December 2023 he was elected National Deputy representing Santa Fe Province in the alliance Union for the Homeland.
