= María Lorenza Barreneche =

First lady of Argentina (1926–2016)

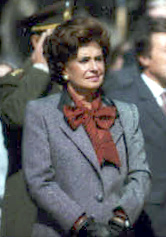

First Lady of Argentina
- In role 10 December 1983 – 8 July 1989
- President: Raúl Alfonsín
- Preceded by: Nilda Raquel Belén
- Succeeded by: Zulema Yoma

Personal details
- Born: María Lorenza Barreneche Iriarte; 3 July 1926 Chascomús, Buenos Aires Province, Argentina
- Died: 5 January 2016 (aged 89) Buenos Aires, Argentina
- Spouse: Raúl Alfonsín (m. 1949; died 2009)
- Children: Raúl Felipe; Ana María; Ricardo Luis; Marcela; María Inés; Javier Ignacio

María Lorenza Barreneche Iriarte (3 July 1926 – 5 January 2016) was an Argentine public figure and First Lady of Argentina from 1983 until 1989 as the wife of the late President Raúl Alfonsín.

Barreneche was born in 1926 in Chascomús, Buenos Aires Province, to Felipe Barreneche Echaide (1896–1984) and María Lorenza Iriarte Hospital (1898–1989). She was of Basque descent. She met her husband, Raúl Alfonsín, a law student who was also born in Chascomús, at a masquerade ball during the 1940s. The couple who married in 1948, had six children namely Raúl Felipe (b. 1949), Ana María (b. 1951), Ricardo (b. 1953), Marcela (b. 1955), María Inés (b. 1957) and Javier Ignacio (b. 1959). Barreneche, who disliked politics, focused on raising their children during her husband's political career.

Former President Raúl Alfonsín died on 31 March 2009. Barreneche was unable to attend his state funeral due to her own poor health. Barreneche had suffered from declining health during her later life, including loss of eyesight and decreased mobility. She died in Buenos Aires on 5 January 2016, at the age of 89. Her remains were cremated at La Chacarita Cemetery. She was buried in La Recoleta Cemetery in Buenos Aires. President Mauricio Macri tweeted his condolences to her family.

Honorary titles
Preceded by Nilda Raquel Belén	First Lady of Argentina; 1983–1989	Succeeded by Zulema Yoma
