= National Civil Aviation Administration =

- Administración Nacional de Aviación Civil
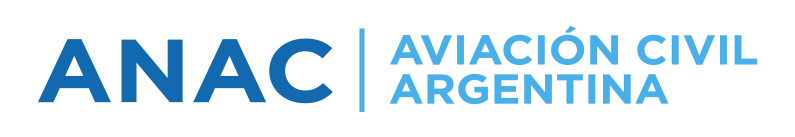

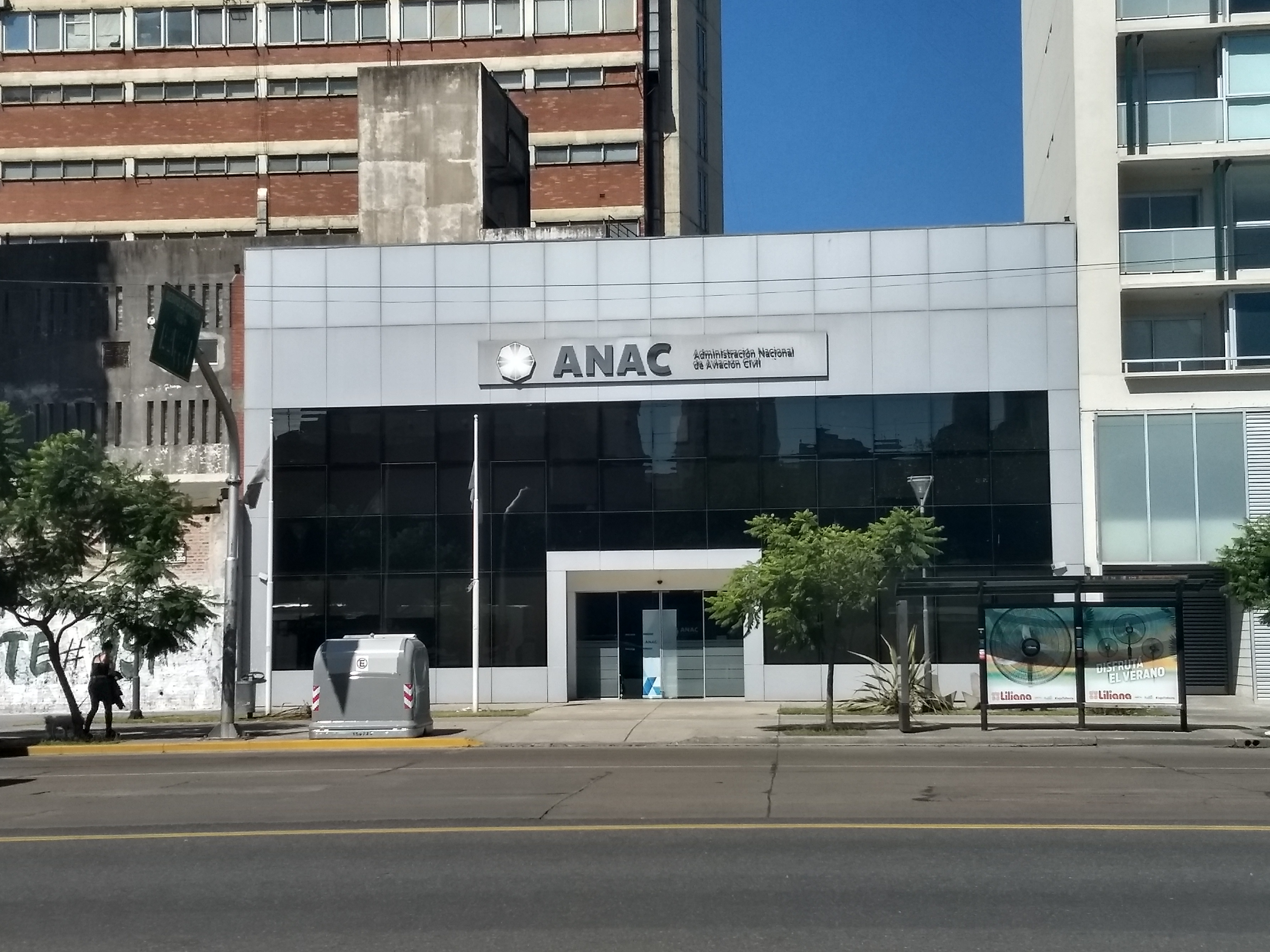
- ANAC headquarters

Agency overview
- Formed: 15 March 2007
- Jurisdiction: Government of Argentina
- Headquarters: Buenos Aires, Argentina
- Agency executive: Paola Tamburelli, National Administrator
- Parent department: Ministry of Transport
- Website: argentina.gob.ar/anac

Footnotes
- Sources: ANAC

The National Civil Aviation Administration (Spanish: Administración Nacional de Aviación Civil), otherwise known by its local initialism ANAC, is the civil aviation authority of Argentina. It was created by a presidential decree on 15 March 2007 to succeed the Argentine Air Force regarding its functions of overseeing all aspects of civil aviation in Argentina. The body is divided into five Directorates, as well as several operative dependencies. It has its headquarters in Buenos Aires.

== See also ==
- International Civil Aviation Organization
- List of civil aviation authorities
