= Jorge Sarghini =

Argentine politician

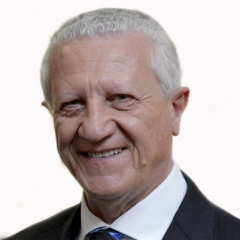

National Deputy
- In office 19 December 2019 – 10 December 2021
- Constituency: Buenos Aires
- In office 10 December 2005 – 10 December 2009
- Constituency: Buenos Aires

President of the Buenos Aires Province Chamber of Deputies
- In office 5 December 2015 – 21 December 2016
- Preceded by: Horacio Ramiro González
- Succeeded by: Manuel Mosca

Provincial Deputy of Buenos Aires
- In office 10 December 2013 – 10 December 2017
- Constituency: Capital Electoral Section

Secretary of Communications
- In office 5 March 2002 – 3 May 2002
- President: Eduardo Duhalde
- Preceded by: Oscar Félix González
- Succeeded by: Eduardo Marcelo Kohan

Minister of Economy of Buenos Aires Province
- In office 10 December 1997 – 13 February 2002
- Governor: Eduardo Duhalde; Carlos Ruckauf; Felipe Solá
- Preceded by: Jorge Remes Lenicov
- Succeeded by: Gerardo Otero

Personal details
- Born: 11 June 1953 (age 73) Benito Juárez, Argentina
- Party: Justicialist Party (until 2013); Renewal Front (until 2019)
- Other political affiliations: United for a New Alternative (2015–2017); 1País (2017–2019); Federal Consensus (2019–present)
- Education: National University of La Plata

Jorge Emilio Sarghini (born 11 June 1953) is an Argentine economist and politician. Historically a member of the Justicialist Party, Sarghini has served in a number of political posts throughout his career, most notably as a member and president of the Buenos Aires Province Chamber of Deputies, as Minister of Economy of Buenos Aires Province during the successive administrations of Eduardo Duhalde and Carlos Ruckauf, and briefly as Secretary of Communications during Duhalde's interim presidency in 2002.

In 2013, Sarghini left the Justicialist Party and joined the Renewal Front, led by Sergio Massa. After having served in the Chamber of Deputies from 2005 to 2009, Sarghini became once again a member of the lower house of Congress in 2019, replacing the vacancy left by Daniel Arroyo.

== Early life and career ==
Jorge Sarghini was born on 11 June 1953 in Benito Juárez, a minor town in Southern Buenos Aires Province. He studied economics at the National University of La Plata, graduating in 1976.

== Political career ==
Sarghini was appointed Undersecretary of Finances of Buenos Aires Province in 1989, in the administration of economy minister Jorge Remes Lenicov during the governorship of Antonio Cafiero. During that time period, Sarghini also served as representative to the Federal Tax Commission. From 1991 to 1996, he was Chief of Advisors, and from 1996 to 1997, he was Undersecretary of Fiscal Policy and Coordination.

In 1997, he was appointed Minister of Economy of the Province by Governor Eduardo Duhalde. He was kept in the position following the election of Carlos Ruckauf in 1999. Sarghini briefly remained in the position after Ruckauf's resignation in 2002, under Governor Felipe Solá, but resigned from the position on 13 February 2002 due to differences between Sarghini and Solá.

In March 2002, Sarghini was appointed Secretary of Communications of Argentina by then-interim president Duhalde, taking over from Oscar Félix González. He was dismissed just two months later, and was succeeded by Eduardo Marcelo Kohan.

=== National deputy ===
On 15 December 2003, Sarghini was appointed President of the Bank of Buenos Aires Province (Banco Provincia), and served in the position until 15 July 2005, when he resigned to run for a seat in the Argentine Chamber of Deputies. He was the second candidate in the dissident Justicialist Party list (which ran separate from the ruling Front for Victory); the list received 15.17% of the vote, enough for Sarghini to be elected. Sarghini unsuccessfully ran for the governorship of Buenos Aires in the 2007 provincial election, as the Concertación para Una Nación Avanzada (UNA) candidate. Sarghini received 2.90% of the vote and landed fifth in the general election.

Sarghini ran for the Argentine Chamber of Deputies again in 2017, this time the sixth candidate in the 1País list (of which the Renewal Front was part). The list received 11.03%, not enough for Sarghini to be elected. Following the 2019 general election, in which Alberto Fernández was elected president of Argentina, 1País deputy Daniel Arroyo was appointed Social Development Minister and Sarghini was appointed in his stead. He was sworn in as deputy on 19 December 2019, as part of the Federal Consensus parliamentary bloc.

=== Provincial deputy ===
In 2013, Sarghini was elected to the Buenos Aires Province Chamber of Deputies as part of the Renewal Front list in the Capital Electoral District, which encompasses the Greater La Plata. On 5 December 2015, he was elected president of the Chamber.
