= Florencio Randazzo =

Argentine politician

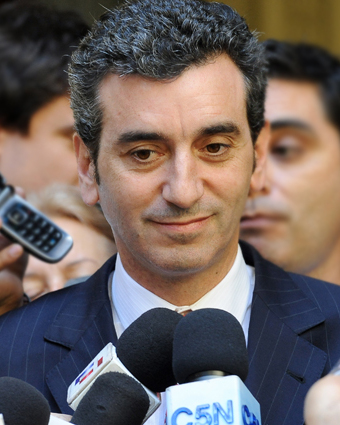

National Deputy
- In office 10 December 2021 – 10 December 2025
- Constituency: Buenos Aires

Minister of the Interior and Transport
- In office 10 December 2007 – 10 December 2015
- President: Cristina Fernández de Kirchner
- Preceded by: Aníbal Fernández
- Succeeded by: Rogelio Frigerio (Interior); Guillermo Dietrich (Transport)

Personal details
- Born: 1 March 1964 (age 62) Chivilcoy, Argentina
- Party: Justicialist Party
- Other political affiliations: Front for Victory (2003–2017); Justicialist Front (2017–2019); Vamos con Vos (2021–present)
- Spouse: Andrea Veronica Pantanali
- Children: 2
- Education: University of Buenos Aires
- Profession: Accountant

Aníbal Florencio Randazzo (born 1 March 1964) in an Argentine Justicialist Party politician. He was Minister of the Interior and Transport during the presidency of Cristina Fernández de Kirchner, from 2007 to 2015. An ally of Kirchner's during most of his political career, Randazzo fell out with her and ran against her for a seat in the Senate in 2017.

From 2021 to 2025 he was a National Deputy elected in Buenos Aires Province as part of the Vamos con Vos alliance.

== Life and times ==
Aníbal Florencio Randazzo was born in Chivilcoy, Buenos Aires Province, in 1964, to Gladys Campagnon and Juan "Togo" Randazzo, whose father emigrated from Sicily to Argentina. The elder Randazzo was an active Peronist organizer in Chivilcoy and first involved his son, Florencio, in political activity in 1981, during an economic crisis precipitated by Argentina's dictatorship at the time. Enrolling at the University of Buenos Aires in 1983, he graduated with a degree in accountancy in 1989.

Randazzo was brought on in 1991 as the executive assistant for Fernando Galmarini, the Minister of Government to the new Governor of Buenos Aires, Eduardo Duhalde. He also accepted a pro bono position in the Provincial Organ Transplant Fund, a post he retained until 2003. Named the Minister of Government's Chief of Staff in 1992, he was elected Chivilcoy City Council President in 1993, a position he accepted ad honorem while retaining a post as Director of the Governor's Rural Development office. Elected to the Buenos Aires Provincial Legislature in 1995, he served in numerous social and economic policy committees and, from 1999, as majority leader before his 2002 appointment as Secretary of Government Modernization by the new Governor, Felipe Solá. Governor Solá named Randazzo Cabinet Chief in 2003, effectively making him his top adviser.

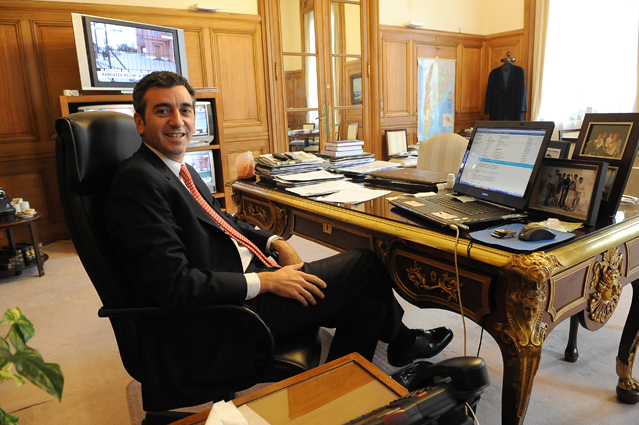
Randazzo at his desk

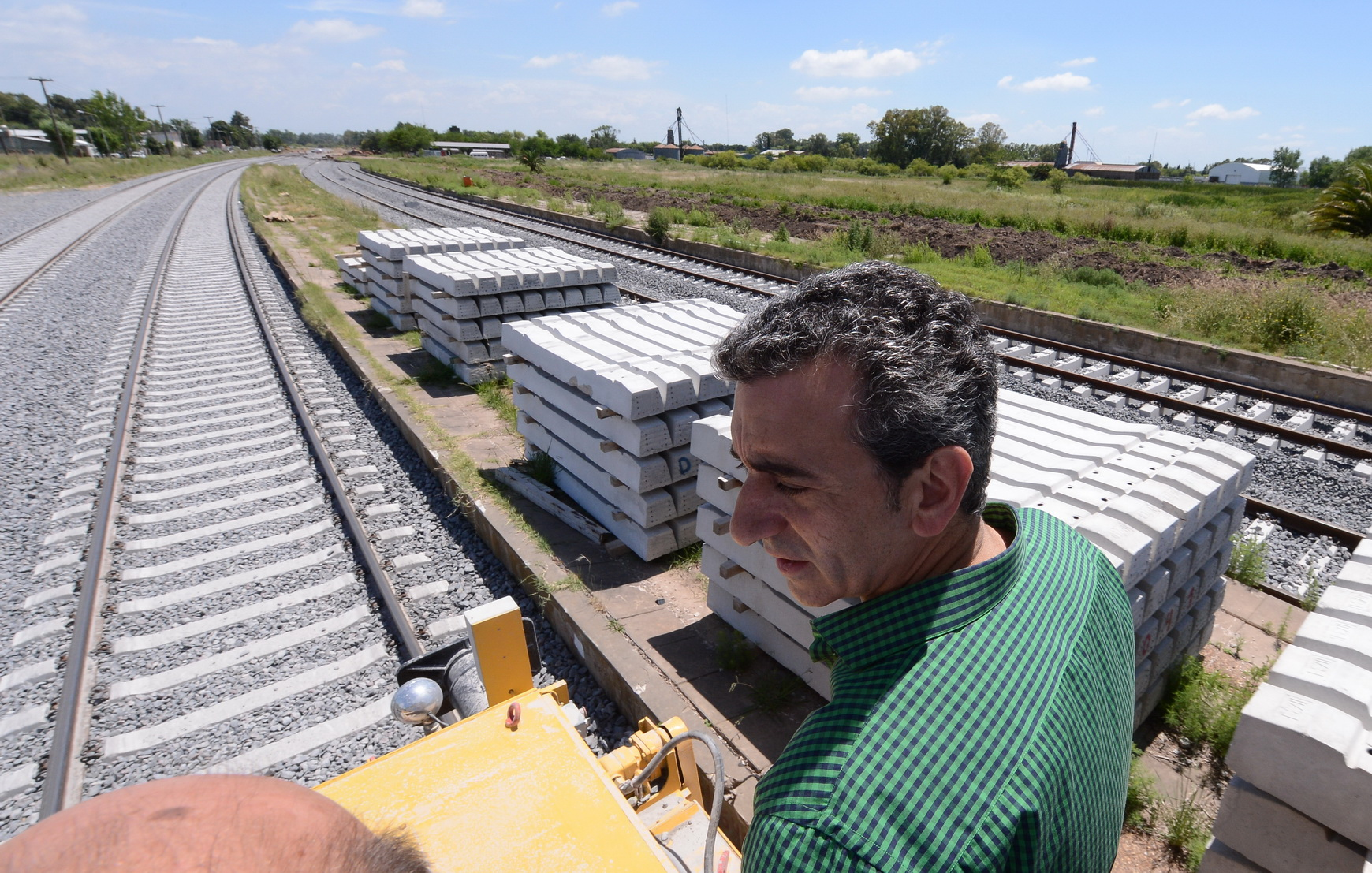
Randazzo overseeing rail constriction on the General Roca Railway.

Opposed by many of the Greater Buenos Aires-area Mayors primarily because Solá broke with tradition by naming a Cabinet Chief from outside the metro area (home to two out of three residents in the Province of Buenos Aires), Randazzo largely limited himself to his role as the Governor's political adviser. The Legislature's rejection of Gustavo Lopetegui as President of the Bank of the Province of Buenos Aires (the nation's second-largest) in December 2005 led Randazzo to recommend the relatively young Martín Lousteau to the powerful post, a decision that reaped Solá benefits when Lousteau successfully negotiated a US$65 million debt the institution owed Spain's Banco Santander.

Following outgoing President Néstor Kirchner's decision to transfer the Interior Ministry's traditional aegis over law enforcement to the Justice Ministry (leaving Interior focused on political affairs), newly elected President Cristina Kirchner, on Governor Solá's recommendation, appointed Randazzo Interior Minister upon taking office on 10 December 2007.

Randazzo ordered Society of St. Pius X Bishop Richard Williamson to leave the country within ten days on February 19, 2009, following recent comments the bishop made to Swedish television, espousing Holocaust denial.

=== 2015 general election candidacy ===
In early 2015, he has announced his intention to run for the 2015 general elections as a precandidate for the presidency of the nation as part of the incumbent Frente para la Victoria party. Deputy Elisa Carrió denounced that he may be in a conflict of interest, as he leads the ministry that organizes the elections, and should either decline his candidacy or resign to his office. In June 2015, he was offered to stand for the position of governor of Buenos Aires Province, a position held by then by Daniel Scioli (who was chosen over Randazzo by the party to be the presidential candidate) and which Randazzo turned down in an open letter.

=== 2017 legislative elections ===
In June 2017 Randazzo announced his intention to run for Senator from the province of Buenos Aires.

== See also ==
- Ministries of the Argentine Republic
- Transport in Argentina
- Rail transport in Argentina
