= Colonia San Ricardo =

- Town
- Location within Buenos Aires Province
- Coordinates: 34°24′51″S 61°55′39″W
- Country: Argentina
- Province: Buenos Aires
- Partidos: General Pinto
- Established: April 13, 1893
- Elevation: 109 m (358 ft)

Population (2001 Census)
  - Total: 809
- Time zone: UTC−3 (ART)
- CPA Base: B 6042
- Climate: Dfc

Colonia San Ricardo is a town located in the General Pinto Partido in the province of Buenos Aires, Argentina.

== Geography ==
Colonia San Ricardo is located 358 km (222 mi) from the city of Buenos Aires.

== History ==
The town was founded on April 13, 1893 by the Alvear family, who bought the land from the Argentine government in 1868. A rail station, named "General Iriarte", was built around the same time by the San Martín Railway. Rail service was halted in 2017, but resumed shortly after.

== Population ==
According to INDEC, which collects population data for the country, the town had a population of 809 people as of the 2001 census.
