= General Pinto Partido =

General Pinto Partido de General Pinto
- Department
- Coat of arms

- location of General Pinto Partido in Buenos Aires Province
- Coordinates: 36°02′S 59°06′W
- Country: Argentina
- Established: 22 October 1891
- Named for: Manuel Guillermo Pinto
- Seat: General Pinto

Government
  - Intendant: Alfredo Zavatarelli (Union for the Homeland)

Area
  - Total: 2,540 km^{2} (980 sq mi)

Population
  - Total: 11,129
  - Density: 4.38/km^{2} (11.3/sq mi)
- Demonym: pintense
- Postal Code: B6050
- IFAM: BUE052
- Area Code: 02356
- Website: pinto.gob.ar

General Pinto Partido is a partido on the northern border of Buenos Aires Province in Argentina.

The provincial subdivision has a population of about 11,000 inhabitants in an area of 2,540 km^{2} (981 sq mi), and its capital city is General Pinto, which is around 355 km (221 mi) from Buenos Aires.

The partido and its district capital are named after General Manuel Guillermo Pinto, who fought in the defence of Buenos Aires against the English and in the Argentine War of Independence. He later went on to serve as Governor of Buenos Aires.

The partido was reduced in size in 1991 due to the creation of Florentino Ameghino Partido.

== Settlements ==
- General Pinto
- Colonia San Ricardo (Estación Iriarte)
- Dos Hermanos
- Dussaud
- El Peregrino
- Günther
- Ingeniero V. Balbín (Villa Roth)
- Los Callejones
- Pazos Kanki
- Villa Francia (Estación Coronel Granada)
- Germania
