= Buenos Aires Province Chamber of Deputies =

Provincial legislature of Argentina

Chamber of Deputies of Buenos Aires Province Cámara de Diputados de la Provincia de Buenos Aires

Type
- Type: Lower house of the Legislature of Buenos Aires Province

Leadership
- President: Alexis Guerrera, UP since 20 December 2024
- Vice President: Enrique Alejandro Dichiara, UP since 20 December 2024

Structure
- Seats: 92
- Political groups: Government (39): FP (39); Opposition (53): LLA (20); PRO (11); UCR (6); Union and Freedom (5); Nuevos Aires (3); CC (3); FIT-U (2); Open Space - Facts (2); Popular Right (1)

Elections
- Last election: 7 September 2025
- Next election: 2027

Meeting place
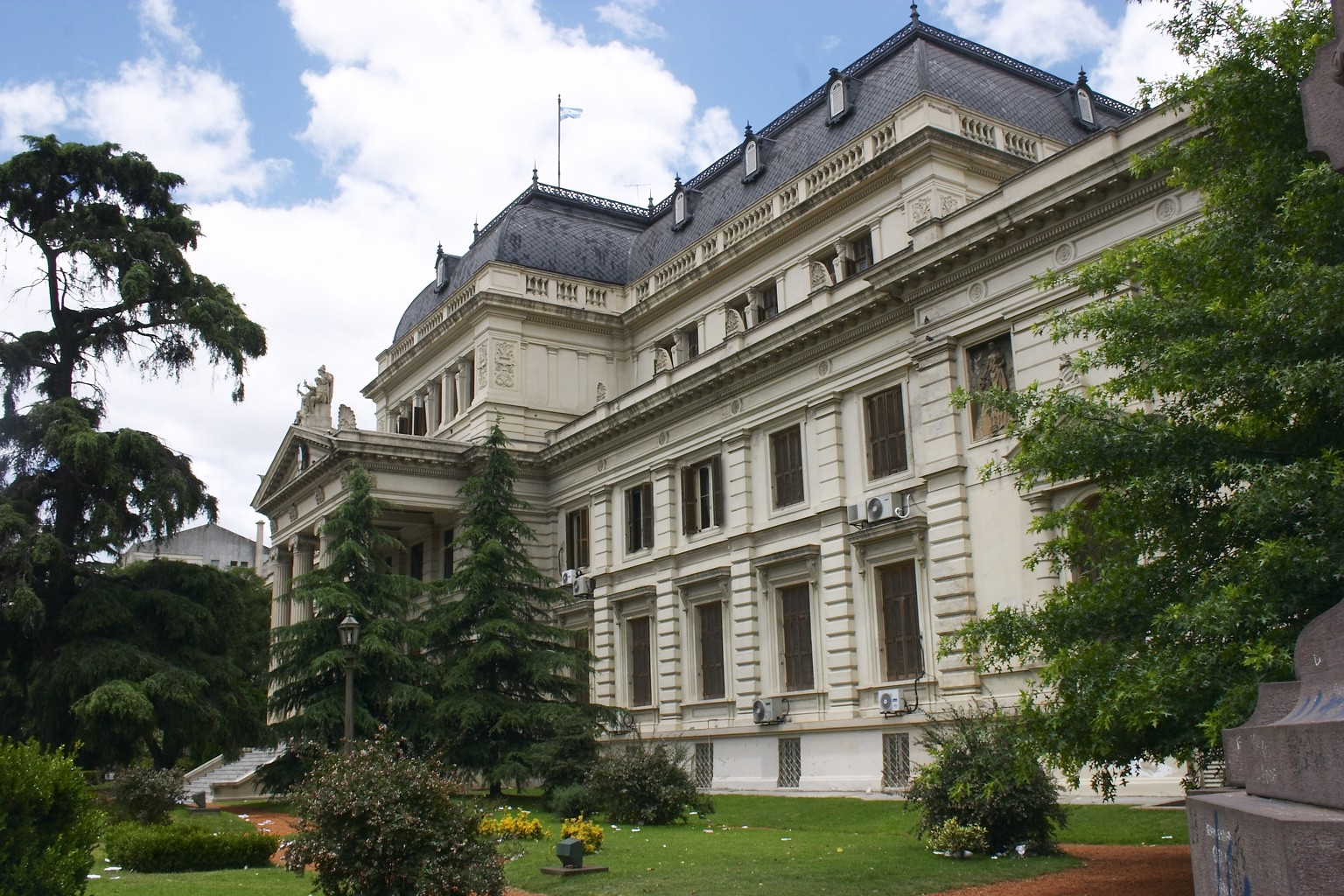
- Legislative Palace of the Province of Buenos Aires; La Plata, Argentina

Website
- http://www.hcdiputados-ba.gov.ar/

The Chamber of Deputies of Buenos Aires Province (Spanish: Cámara de Diputados de la Provincia de Buenos Aires) is the lower house of the Legislature of Buenos Aires Province, the largest and most populous of Argentina's provinces. It is made up of 92 deputies elected in eight multi-member constituencies known as Electoral Sections. The number of deputies that correspond to each of the electoral sections is proportional to their population, as observed in the results of every nationwide census conducted in Argentina every 10 years. Seats may only be added to adjust the proportionality of each section, but never reduced.

As in the National Chamber of Deputies and most other provincial legislatures, elections to the Chamber are held every two years, so that half of its members are up in each election, making it a rare example of staggered elections used in a lower house.

The Chamber was established with the promulgation of the Constitution of the State of Buenos Aires, a short-lived secessionist state, in 1854. Its precursor, the Board of Representatives (Junta de Representantes) was established in 1820 as the province's first functioning legislative lower house. Originally located in the City of Buenos Aires, the provincial legislature was moved to La Plata following that city's establishment in 1882. The body meets in the Legislative Palace, designed by Hannover architects Gustav Heine and Georg Hagemann in 1883 and completed in 1888.

== Presidents of the Chamber ==
The President of the Chamber of Deputies is elected by the absolute majority of its members. The officeholders for this post since 1983 have been:

President	Party	Term start	Term end	Section
Pascual Cappelleri	UCR	10 December 1983	10 December 1987	Third
Luis Rodolfo Almar	UCR	10 December 1987	10 December 1989	Second
Osvaldo Mércuri	PJ	10 December 1989	10 December 1997	Second
Francisco José Ferro	UCR–Alliance	10 December 1989	10 December 1997	Seventh
Alejandro Mosquera	UCR–Alliance	10 December 1998	10 December 1999	
Francisco José Ferro	UCR–Alliance	10 December 1999	10 December 2000	Seventh
Aldo San Pedro	PJ	10 December 2000	10 December 2001	Fourth
Osvaldo Mércuri	PJ	10 December 2001	10 December 2005	Second
Ismael Passaglia	FPV	10 December 2005	10 December 2007	Second
Horacio Ramiro González	FPV	10 December 2007	10 December 2015	First
Jorge Sarghini	FR–UNA	10 December 2015	10 December 2016	Capital
Manuel Mosca	Cambiemos	10 December 2016	10 December 2019	Seventh
Federico Otermín	FDT	10 December 2019	10 December 2023	Third
Enrique Alejandro Dichiara	UP	10 December 2023	20 December 2024	Sixth
Alexis Guerrera	UP	20 December 2024	incumbent	Fourth
