= General Pinto =

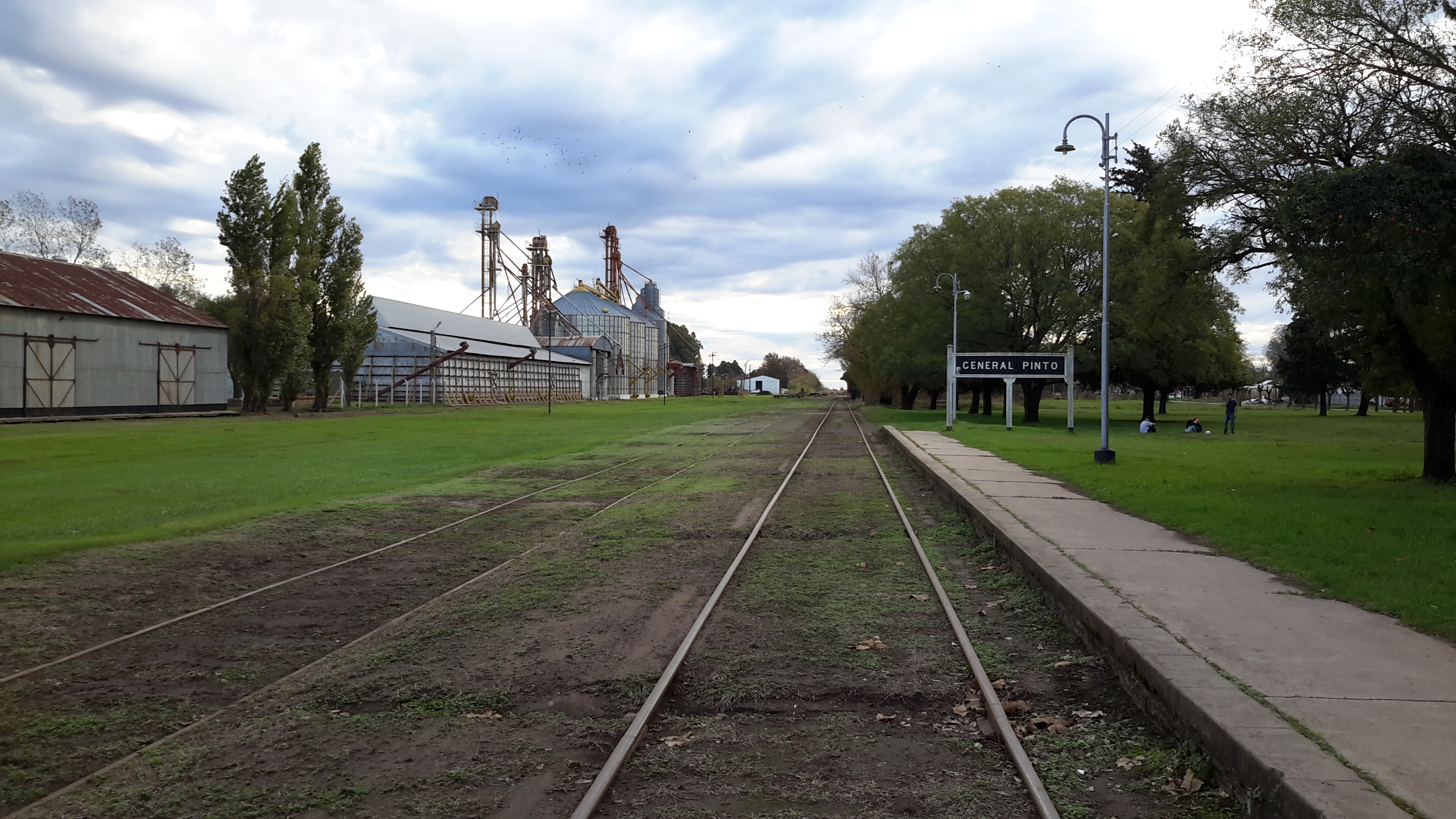

- Coat of arms

- Location in Argentina General Pinto (Buenos Aires Province)
- Coordinates: 34°46′S 61°52′W
- Country: Argentina
- Province: Buenos Aires
- Partido: General Pinto
- Founded: 23 October 1891

Population (2001 census [INDEC])
  - Total: 6,154
- CPA Base: B 6050
- Area code: +54 2356

General Pinto is a town in Buenos Aires Province, Argentina. It is the administrative centre for General Pinto Partido.

The settlement was officially founded on October 23, 1891 by provincial law number 2437. It is purely agricultural. The industrial production comes from her, with creameries, dairy and cheese factories among others.

== Attractions ==
- General Lavalle Museum & Fort
- Martiniano Charras Municipal Park
- Iglesia San José (church)
- Domingo Faustino Sarmiento library

== See also ==
- Manuel Guillermo Pinto
