= Buenos Aires Great Southern Railway =

British railway company in Argentina (1862–1948)

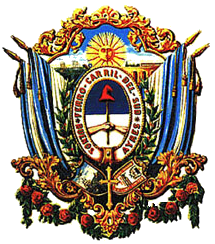

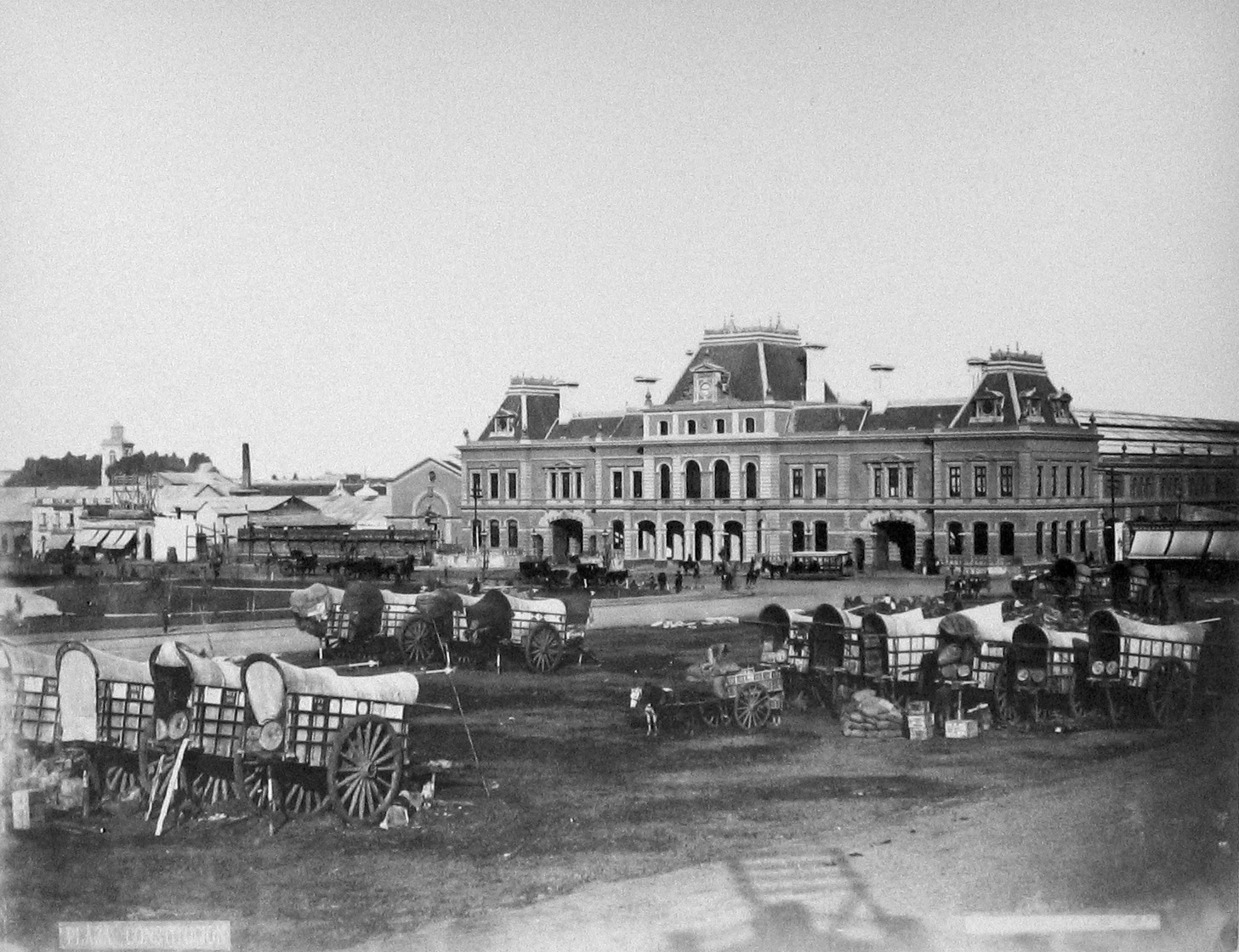
- Constitución station (terminus) in 1885

Overview
- Other name: Ferrocarril del Sud
- Status: Company defunct; some rail lines active
- Owner: Government of Argentina
- Locale: Buenos Aires; La Pampa; Rio Negro; Neuquén
- Termini: Buenos Aires; C. de Patagones Zapala

History
- Opened: 1862
- Closed: 1948; 78 years ago

Technical
- Track gauge: 1,676 mm (5 ft 6 in)

The Buenos Aires Great Southern Railway (BAGS) (Spanish: Ferrocarril del Sud) was one of the Big Four broad gauge, 5 ft 6 in (1,676 mm), British-owned companies that built and operated railway networks in Argentina. The company was founded by Edward Lumb in 1862 and the first general manager was Edward Banfield after whom the Buenos Aires suburban station of Banfield was named, when it opened in 1873. After president Juan Perón nationalised the Argentine railway network in 1948, it became part of the state-owned company Ferrocarril General Roca.

== History ==
=== Preliminary studies ===
The market of Plaza Constitución in Buenos Aires was served by carts coming from the South of the province that crossed the Riachuelo through the "Puente de Gálvez". This transport was too costly besides being slow, thus the products could not be carried on very long distances. In 1860, 7,416 carts with wool and leather had arrived to Constitución (each vehicle had a capacity of 25 100 kg packages).

The state of passenger transport was similar. The carriages made three trips per month to Lobos, Cañuelas, 25 de Mayo, Saladillo and Dolores, two trips per month to Tandil and Lobería and just one to Bahía Blanca. The carriages were accompanied by "cuarteadores" that helped them to cross rivers and streams. There also were intermediate stops such as "La Botica", a grocery store (pulpería) in Lomas de Zamora of Greater Buenos Aires.

This form of transport had several disadvantages. The roads were not in good condition and the rivers forced passengers to stray dozens of kilometers from the path. The carriages covered an average of 80 km per day.

Because of this, Plaza Constitución was the first option to build a terminus station of a great railway that connected the city of Buenos Aires with the south of the province.

=== First steps of the railway ===
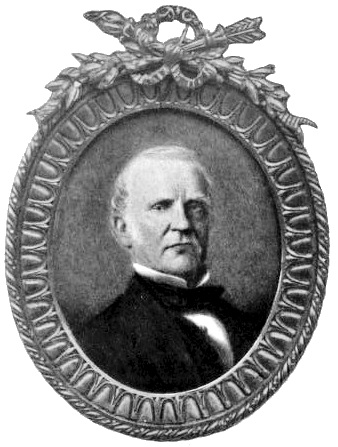
Edward Lumb, founder and first president of the company

In August 1861, Edward Lumb, a British entrepreneur, requested the concession of a railway line that would run from Constitución to the city of Chascomús, 120 km from Buenos Aires. Lumb offered $ 1,000,000 as guarantee to the Government of Buenos Aires. Lumb's initiative was debated in the Chamber of Deputies, where it was concluded that the railroad was necessary for the development of the Argentinian nation. Juan B. Alberdi stated "The railroad will join the Argentine Republic better than all the congresses... without the 'iron road' that connects their extremes, the country will be always divisible and divided against all the Legislative decrees".

Finally, on May 27, 1862, the Buenos Aires Legislature promulgated the Law that authorized President of Argentina, Bartolomé Mitre, to enter into a contract with Edward Lumb. The Government demanded an interest rate of 7% on the costs of construction over 40 years. On the other hand, the company was exempt from paying contributions, taxes and custom fees. The railway company had also to carry the post for free. The Government could expropriate the railway and its assets if the company did not offer an additional 20% of the construction costs as compensation. The rail gauge should be the same as that of the Buenos Aires Western Railway and the company was able to build a tram line to Monserrat and other strategic points in the city of Buenos Aires. The contract was officialized by the Government of Argentina on June 12, 1862.

On November 12 the railroad route was approved, according to the maps proposed by the concession. The Government wanted the railway to cross San Vicente but the landscape was unsuitable. Consequently, the line's route was moved to La Paz (current Lomas de Zamora), where the field was more solid to extend the tracks. The route would extend from La Paz to Samborombón.

Lumb tried to get money in Buenos Aires to finance the construction of the railroad, but his attempts were not successful. As a result, he traveled to London, where bankers Baring and David Robertson agreed to give the company credit to finance the construction of the railroad. The limited liability company Buenos Aires Great Southern Railway was established, whose statutes were approved in 1863. The company requested Samuel Petro & E. Ladd to take over the construction of the whole railroad, including lands, stations, workshops and rolling stock at a cost of GBP 651,000. For GBP 14,000 the company hired the engineer Thomas Rumball to supervise the works.

When the works were about to begin, William Wheelwright (owner of Central Argentine Railway) tried to boycott the works of BAGSR and refused to cooperate with the other British companies that built competitive railways. He also stated that the BAGSR had obtained more benefits than his own company (CAR) to build the line. The Governor of Buenos Aires refused to sign a contract until the issue was solved. Finally Robertson paid a bribe of GBP 22,000. The terms of the new contract determined that the line would be extended to Dolores and Azul.

=== Construction ===
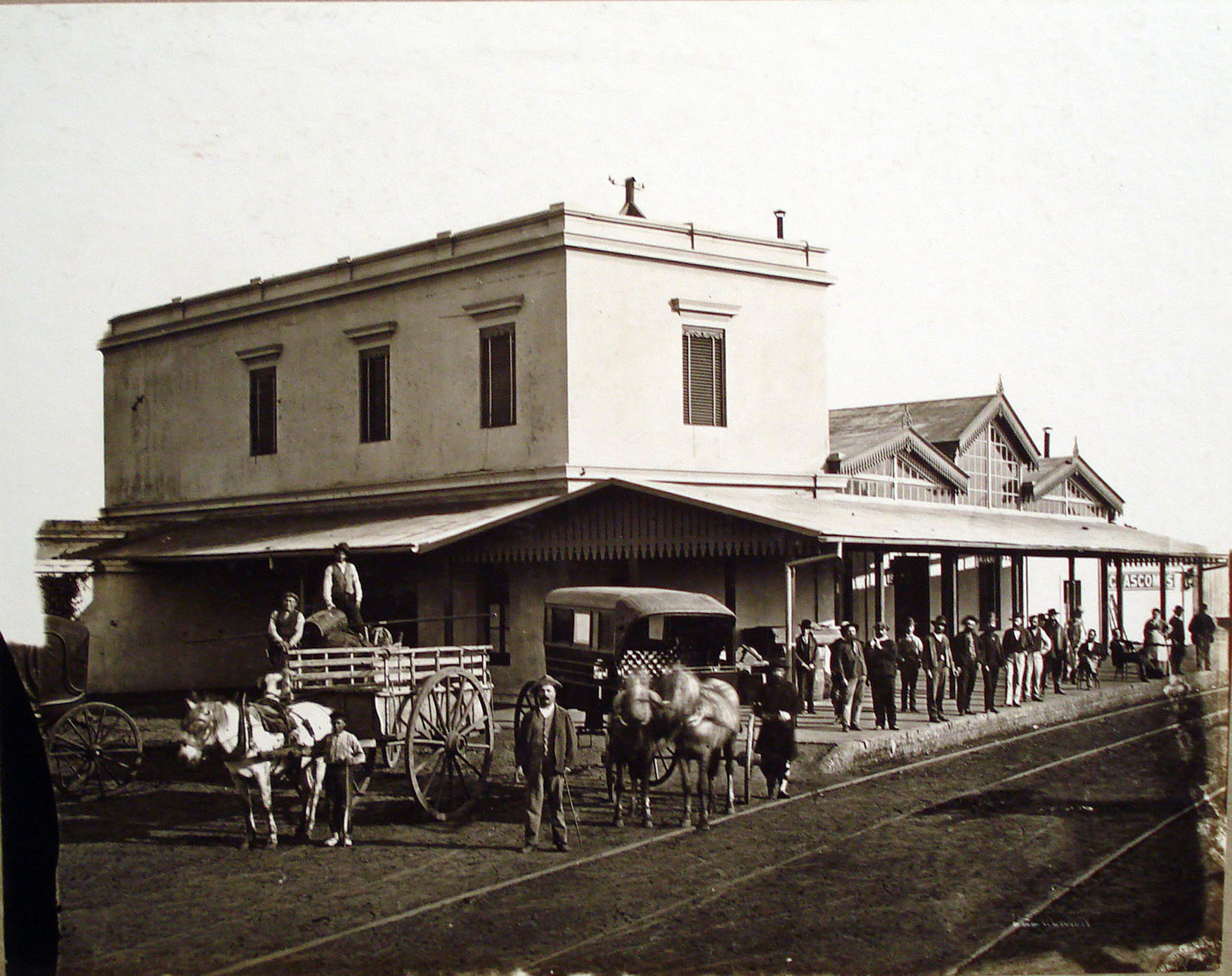
The Chascomús station in 1875

On March 7, 1864, works began where the Constitución railway station is placed nowadays. Previously, a big celebration had been held, with a ceremony attended by President of Argentina Bartolomé Mitre and Governor of Buenos Aires Province, Mariano Saavedra.

The first section of the railroad (77 km from Buenos Aires to Jeppener) was inaugurated on August 14, 1865. By December it had been extended to Chascomús (113 km). A total of 11 estaciones were built on this path: Plaza Constitución, Barracas al Sud (current Avellaneda), Lomas de Zamora, Glew, San Vicente (current Alejandro Korn), Domselaar, Ferrari (then Coronel Brandsen), Jeppener, Facio (then Altamirano), Gándara and Chascomús.

The rolling stock was composed by 8 locomotives (manufactured by Robert Stephenson and Company), 38 first and second class wagons, by Brown, Marshalls and Co. Ltd. and 184 wagons for freight transport.

The line was single track with the exception of the path between Constitución and Barracas, where a double track was built to facilitate the transit of the trains due to the workshops and rolling stock depots operated in Barracas.

As time passed, some station were added, such as Barracas al Norte (current Hipólito Yrigoyen, 1866), Burzaco (1867) and Lanús (1868). The Great Southern Railway did not extend their tracks until 1870 but the profits increased year after year. In 1870 the line carried 516,993 passenger and 54,116 tonnes of freight.

Year	Km	Passengers	Tonnes of freight
1866	114	193.608	14.439
1867	114	363.705	23.636
1868	114	423.834	32.376
1869	114	521.991	47.184

=== The bridge over the Riachuelo ===
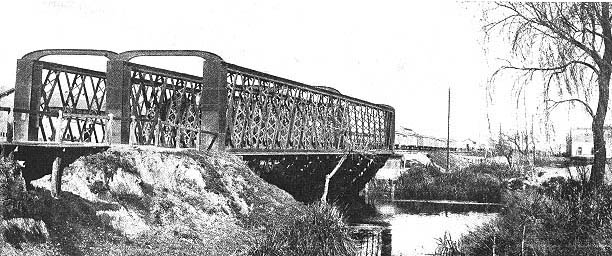
The first bridge over the Riachuelo operated from 1865 to 1909

The first serious obstacle that the engineers found was the Riachuelo, a stream that defines the southern boundary of the Buenos Aires federal district. It was necessary to build a double bridge (because of the double track that ran between Constitución to Barracas) to cross the stream. For that purpose, three iron cylinders were placed in both sides of the stream, filling them with concrete. The bridges were placed on those cylinders.

The first bridge built by the BAGSR over the Riachuelo lasted 44 years, so in 1909 it was replaced by a moveable bridge that operated until 1982, when the line was electrified and a new bridge (built in concrete) replaced the old iron structure.

=== Expansion to Dolores and Azul ===
By 1880 the GSR line reached 562 km built. The contract of concession ruled that the line should be extended to Dolores or any city determined by the National Government. The company built a branch from Altamirano to Río Salado (current General Belgrano Partido) in 1871. One year later the line extended to Las Flores and finally reached the city of Azul in 1876.

Some of the stations built were Ranchos, Villanueva, Bonnement, Salado, Chas, San Pedro (then Newton), Rosas, Las Flores, Colorado (then Dr. D. Harosteguy), Pardo, Cacharí, Parish, Pinedo and Azul.

The branch to Chascomús was extended to Dolores (opening this new section in 1874). The new stations built were Monasterio, Lezama, Guerrero, Taillade (current Castelli), Sevigné and Dolores (km 203).

=== The urban section of Buenos Aires ===
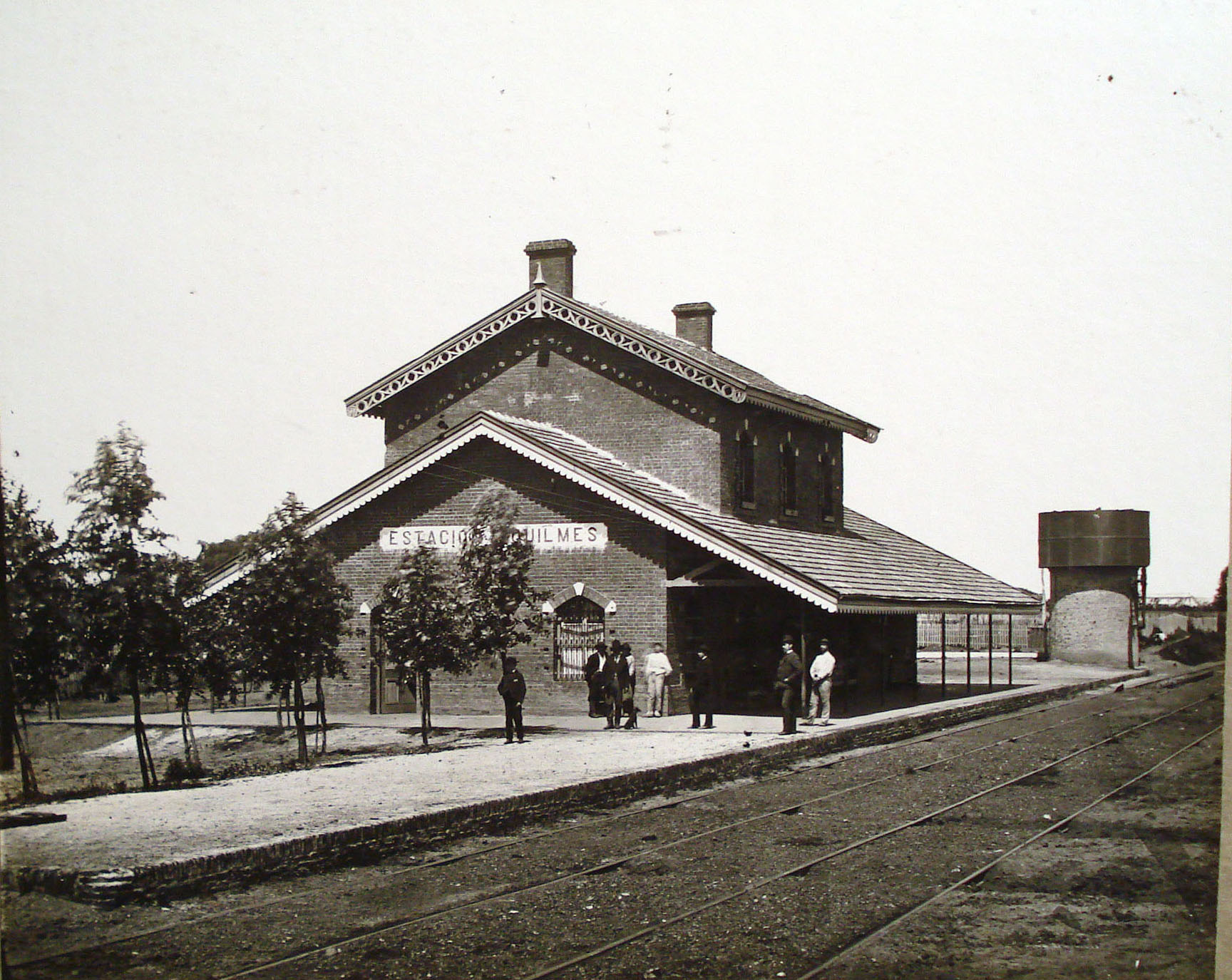
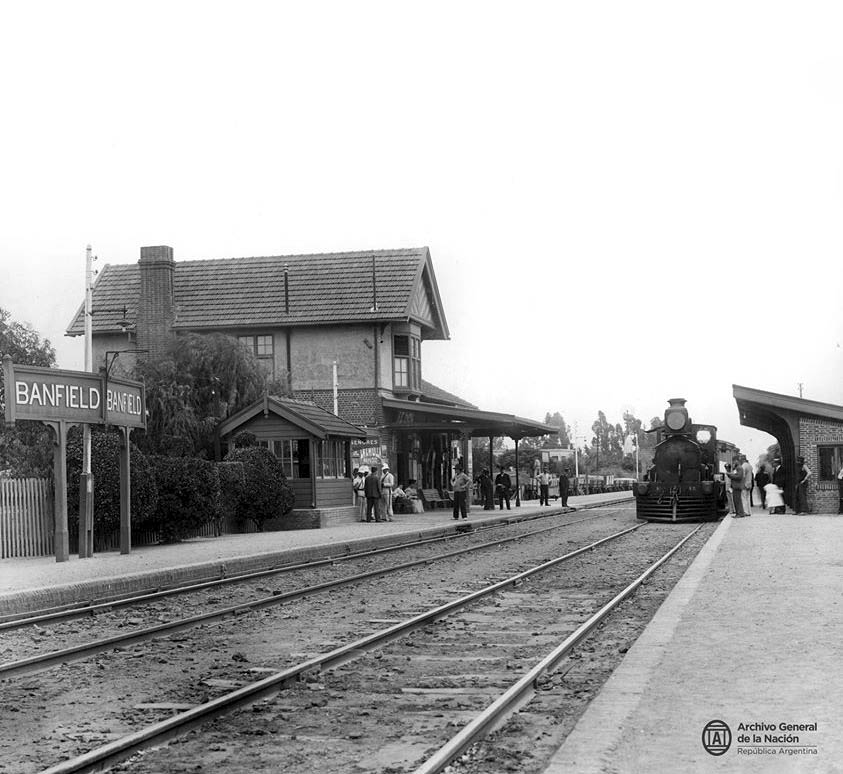
Quilmes (left) and Banfield stations pictured in 1890 and 1900 respectively

The original Lomas de Zamora station building was demolished at the beginning of the 1870s to make way for a more modern structure. The new stations built were: Temperley (1871), Adrogué (1872) and Banfield (1873). Temperley was then a small town with small farms extending from Lanús to Burzaco. The nearest station was Lomas de Zamora where some houses stood alongside the main road (today Pavón Avenue).

Jorge Temperley, who owned many plots of land in the area, expressed his interest in building a train stop for which he donated the field where the station would be built. Therefore, in 1871 the primitive Temperley station was inaugurated. The station would be moved some years later to its current location.

In 1877 the BAGSR built new warehouses for the freight trains in Constitución station and acquired land to build a freight station (Solá, in Buenos Aires). The company also increased the capacity of the Barracas al Sud station's warehouses. In the same year all the tracks were replaced and the double track was extended from Barracas to Altamirano.

=== The train reaches Tandil ===
In 1871 the company began to expand their net, through two main branches. The first extended from Altamirano to Azul (connecting cities as Ranchos and Las Flores) and the other branch from Chascomús to Dolores and Ayacucho (inaugurated in 1880).

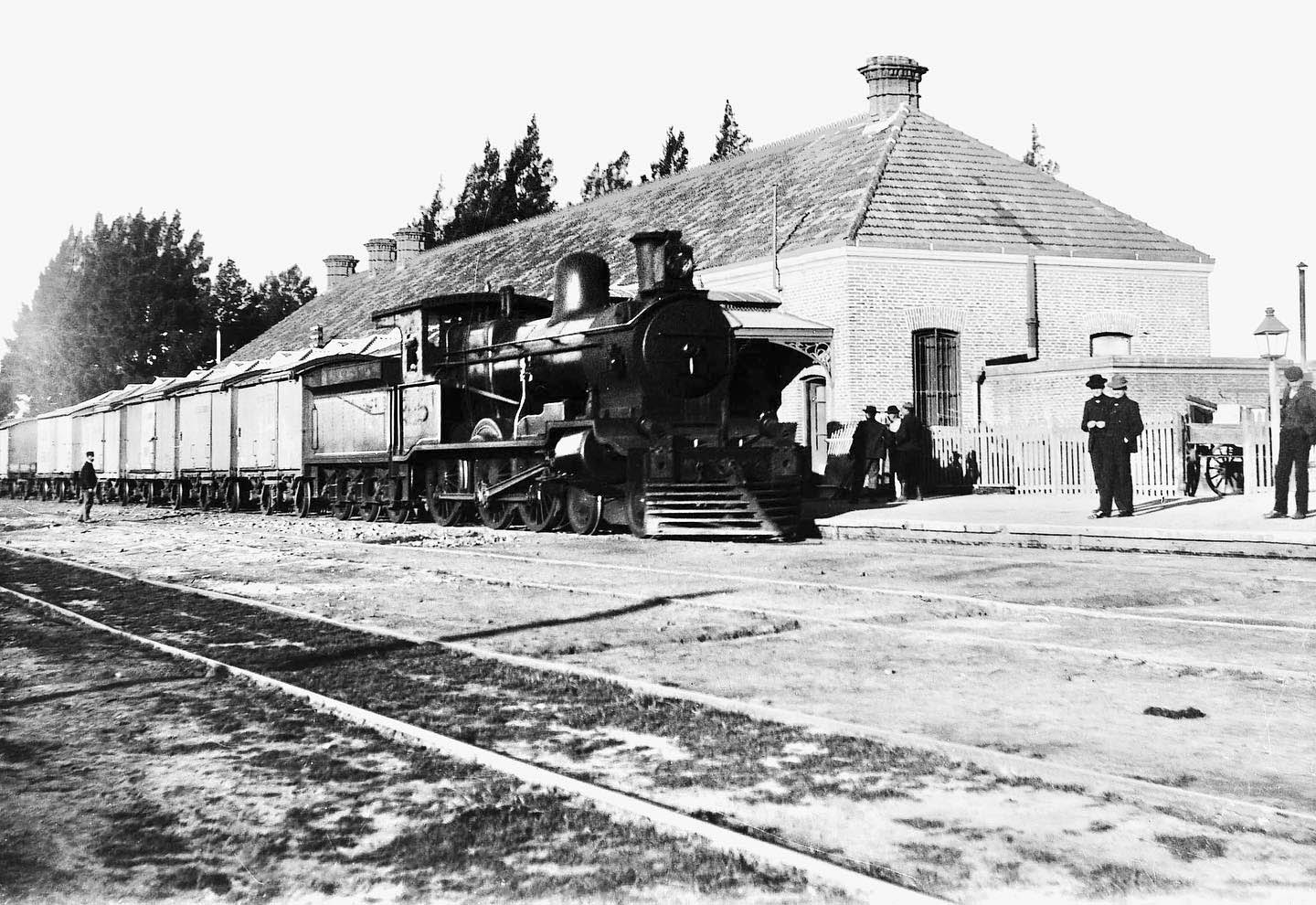
Steam locomotive and train at Tandil station c. 1915

Some rumours referred to a possible expropriation of the company by the Government of Buenos Aires. Because of that, the company directory sent Frank Parish and C.O. Barker (President and Secretary of the company, respectively) to Buenos Aires with the purpose to deal with the Government to avoid cancellation of the concession. The parties finally make an agreement that established BAGSR compromise to build two extensions of the line: one from Azul to Bahía Blanca and the second from Ayacucho to Tandil. The contract signed in October 1881 ruled that the train would reach the city of Tandil within the three subsequent years.

The prolongation of the line from Ayacucho began in 1882. The station was built on a land that had belonged to Mari Blas Dhers, acquired by the company for $200,000.

On May 6, 1883, the first train arrived to Tandil. On September 1 the definitive opening of the line was promulgated.

=== Branches to Bahía Blanca ===
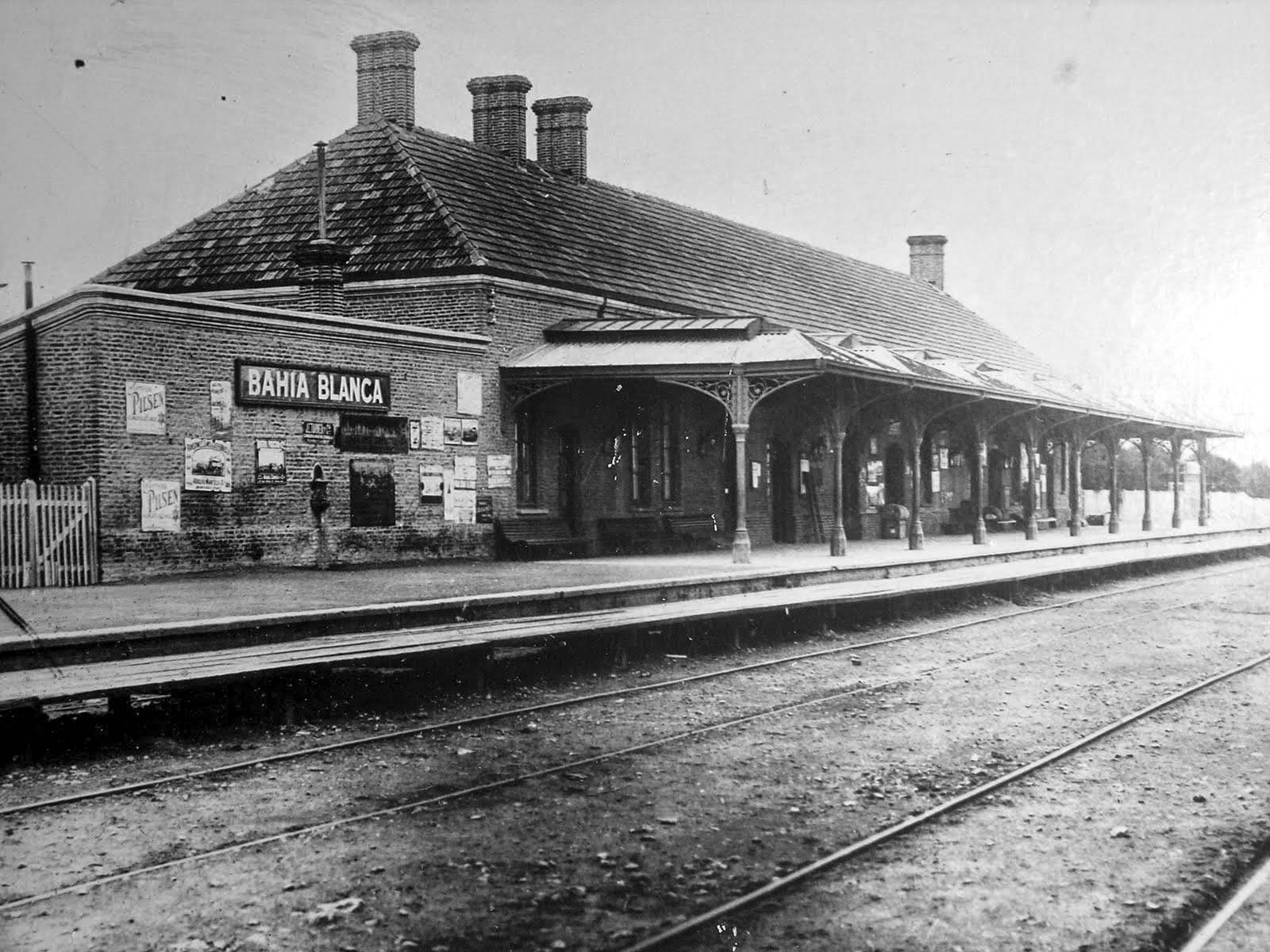
The first Bahía Blanca station in 1906. It would later be demolished to build a new one

By 1884, many towns had been founded in Buenos Aires Province. Some of them were Azul (established 1832), Esperanza (now General Alvear, 1854), Las Flores and 25 de Mayo (both 1856), Tapalqué (1863), Saladillo (1864), Arenales (then Ayacucho, 1866), Olavarría (1867) and Benito Juárez (1874).

Moving among those cities was a real odyssey. In most of cases the vehicle used was the "galera", a big carriage with capacity for many passengers. Those vehicles transport guns to repel malones and assaults, and could cover 80 km in a day.

In 1866 the Government of Argentina and the shipping company Aguirre y Murga signed a deal to establish a passenger and freight service between Buenos Aires, Bahía Blanca and Carmen de Patagones. The contract ruled that the company should make a monthly trip, being granted for its services.

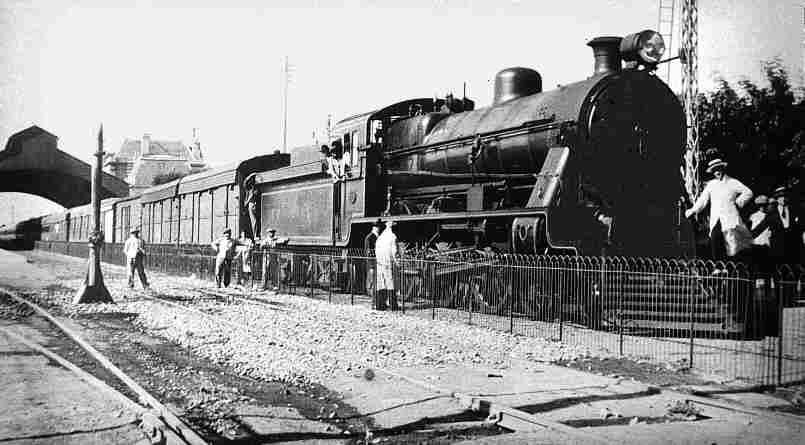
The Vulcan Foundry 12E was used for long-distance services to Mar del Plata, Tandil, Bahía Blanca and other cities

The BAGSR extended the line to Olavarría, opening the service in March 1883. The tracks continued their expansion, reaching General Lamadrid in October. Finally the line reached the city of Bahía Blanca in April 1884, opening the service to passengers on July 7. The travel from Buenos Aires to Bahía Blanca took 24 hours. By 1884 the BAGSR was the largest railroad of Argentina, with 1,025 km operating.

At the same time the line to Bahía Blanca was being built, the company made the arrangements to build a port in that city. The dock was made of steel and finished in 1885. It has 8 cranes, 5 tracks, a length of 300 meters and 200 meters width.

The other branch, extended to Benito Juárez in 1885, reaching the city of Tres Arroyos in April 1886. The company was given approval to extend its tracks from Tres Arroyos to Bahía Blanca. The works were concluded in December 1891.

=== The Ensenada & Port railway ===
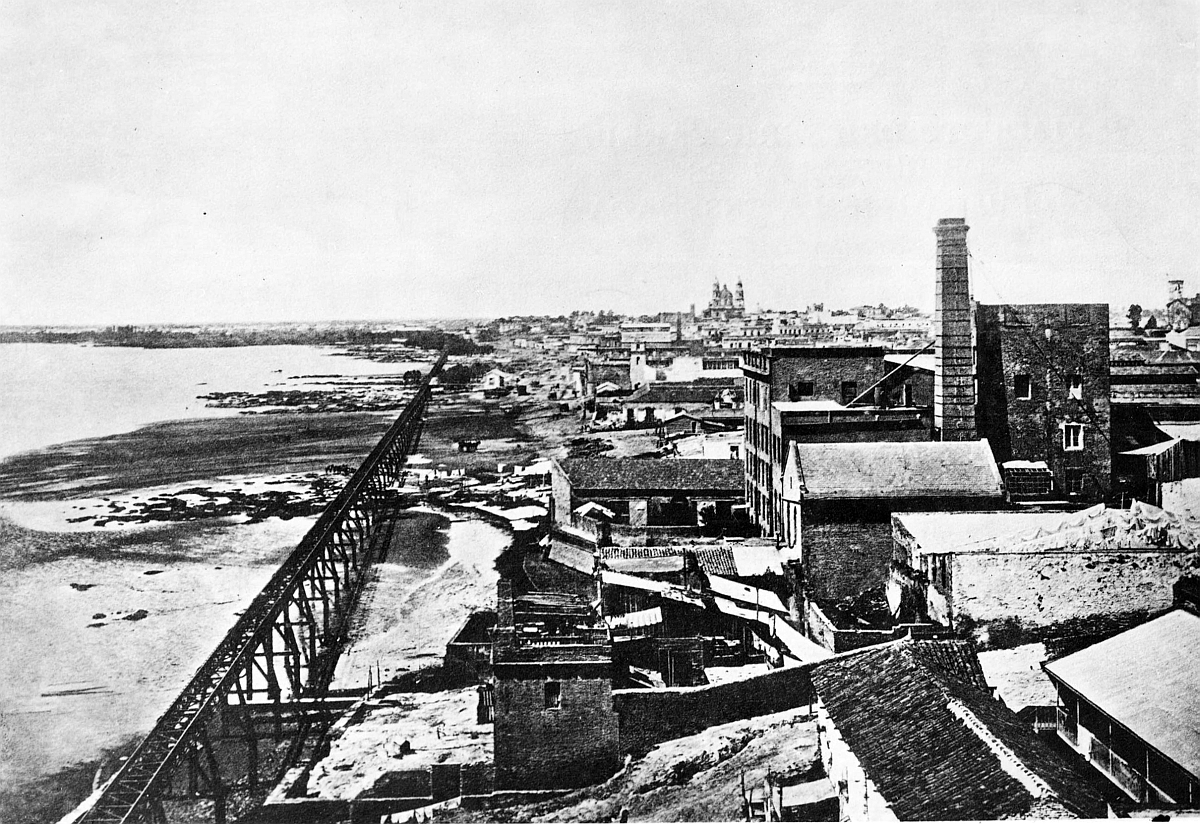
The viaduct over the Paseo Colón Av. of Buenos Aires, 1880.

In 1866 the Buenos Aires and Ensenada Port Railway opened its services to public. The project was to build a new port to replace the Port of Buenos Aires but this project was cancelled and the port never built. The foundation of the city of La Plata in 1882 brought with it the construction of a new railroad with the terminus station in that city. The works were carried out by the Buenos Aires Western Railway, then owned by the Government of Buenos Aires. The construction of a new railroad limited the possibility of expansion of the BAEPR.

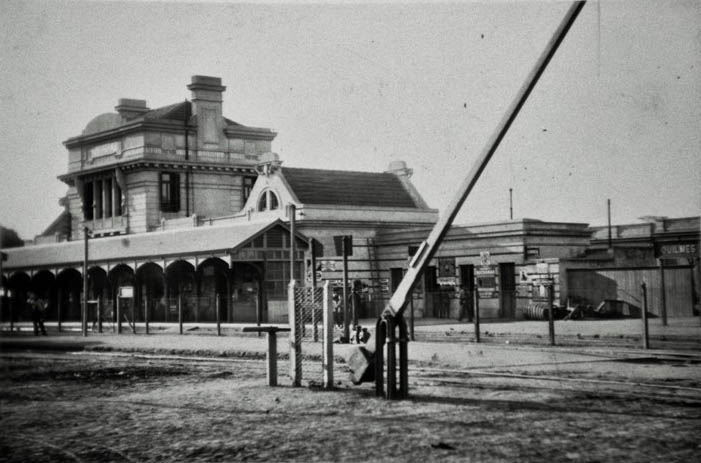
Quilmes station after being remodeled by the BAGSR, c. 1900.

One of the branches built by the BAWR extended from Tolosa to Magdalena, acquired by the BAEPR in 1888. The company also tried to expand its business acquiring the Brandsen-Ringuelet branch. The BAEPR also built a line from Bartolomé Bavio (a small town near to Magdalena, at the South of Buenos Aires Province) to Álvarez Jonte, opened in 1892. The following year the branch extended to Atalaya, Magdalena Partido.

The fire that destroyed the Estación Central of Buenos Aires in 1897, obligated the BAEPR to move the terminus station to Casa Amarilla in La Boca district. As a result, the viaduct used by the BAEPR trains to run over Paseo Colón Avenue was no longer in use (being later dismantled). Therefore, the number of passengers carried by the company (and the profits) decreased considerably.

On July 1, 1898, the Buenos Aires and Ensenada Port Railway was acquired by the Great Southern Railway.

=== Workshops ===
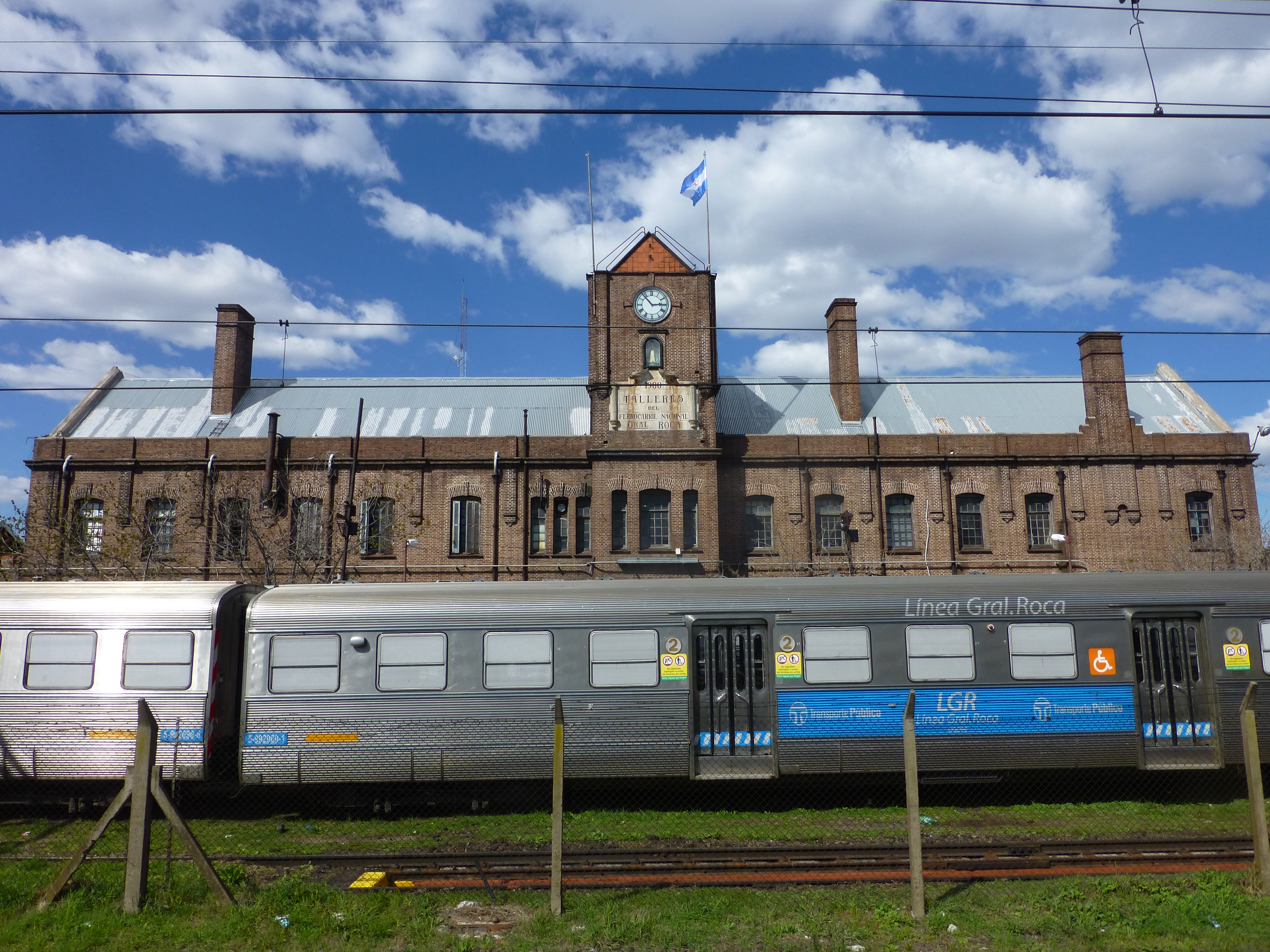
Workshops at Remedios de Escalada.

The railway's repair shops were originally located in Barracas al Sud station and then moved to Sola, where they operated for more than 15 years. The capacity of the workshops was surpassed due to the growth of the line. There was not enough place to enhance the workshop so the company managers considered the possibility of installing new facilities on some point of the line.

Therefore, the new workshops were built in 1901 at Remedios de Escalada, 11 km from the Plaza Constitución, were the largest in South America, and employed nearly 2,700 men. Although primarily for repair work, the shops were equipped to make every part of a locomotive or a railway carriage. When the company took over the working of the Bahía Blanca and North Western Railway from the Buenos Aires and Pacific Railway company in 1925 it acquired the latter's workshops in Bahia Blanca.

At the same time the workshops began their activities in Remedios de Escalada, the company draft a project to build houses for the employees of the workshops. This housing complex was named "Colonia Ferroviaria"

By the end of the 1940s, the workshops of Escalada had become a sort of factories, where all type of components and spare parts for the locomotives and coaches were manufactured.

=== The train arrives to the Atlantic ===
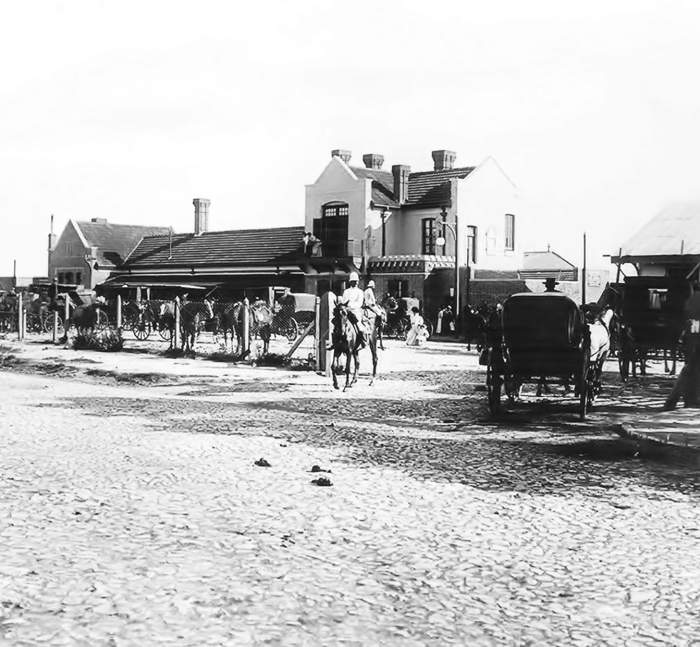
The original Mar del Plata station, where the train arrived for the first time in 1886

On 26 September 1886, the first train arrived to Mar del Plata station, in the homonymous city, which was the main tourist destination during summer seasons.

The BAGSR expanded its business on the Atlantic coast, building lines to other cities. In February 1892 the branch from Ayacucho to Balcarce was opened. On August the line extended to Quequén, a small town next to Necochea. Quequén had one of the main ports of the province.

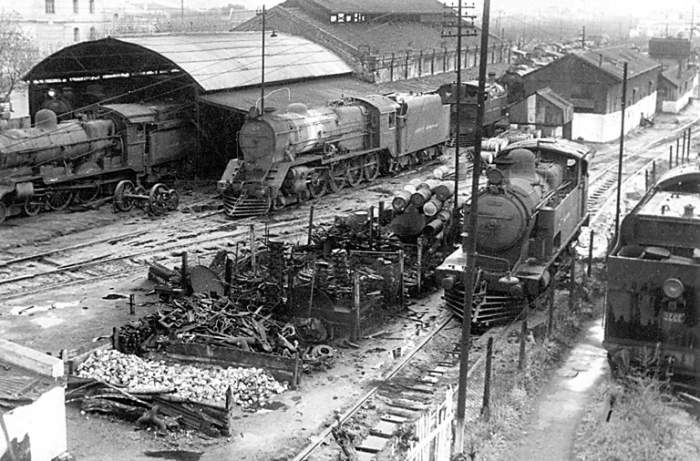
Trains in Mar del Plata station, c. 1910

In 1910 Mar del Plata was the main beach city of Argentina, receiving a huge number of tourists (most of them members of the aristocracy) during the summer. Due to the intense traffic of passengers, the railway station exceeded its capacity and the Municipality demanded the company to increase the facilities. The company had always denied to this request alleging that the station was only overcrowded during two months per year (the period of summer season in Argentina).

During the first decade of the 20th century, the urban development of Mar del Plata moved from the downtown to the South West (nearest to the coast) so the train station was far from the residences and hotels where the tourist were hosted. In June 1908, the Congress promulgated Law 5.535, authorizing the BAGSR to build a new station in Mar del Plata.

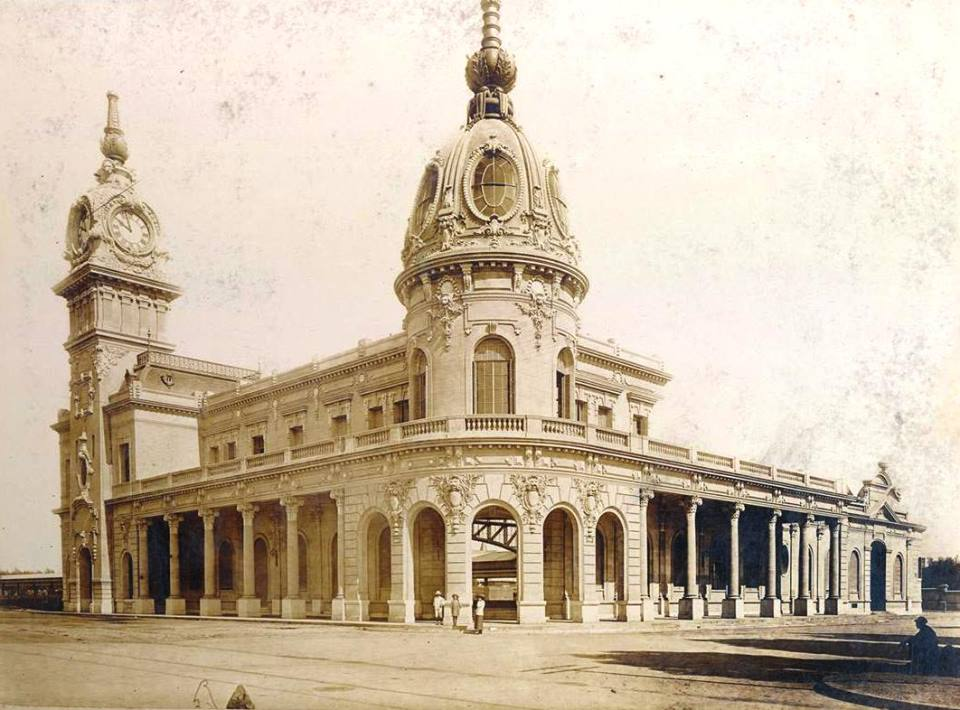
A new station in the city (Mar del Plata Sud) was opened in 1910 and closed in 1949 to serve as bus terminus

Although the construction of a new station had been approved, a neighbours committee (led by Mar del Plata pioneer Pedro Luro) opposed to the old station was demolished, requesting its preservation. Percy Clarke, manager of the company had to accept the neighbours' claim. The other point of conflict with the inhabitants of the city was the path of the new line. While the company wanted to build the new station near to the coast (to reduce costs), the neighbours demanded the station should be located far from the most populated areas of the city. Finally, the BAGSR agreed to build the new station where the neighbours demanded.

The works began in 1909 and were finished one year later, when the station building began to be constructed. The project of the company also included extension of the tracks to the city of Miramar. The new station in Mar del Plata (named "Mar del Plata Sud") was opened On December 1, 1910, although the main building was not still finished so a provisional wooden-structure was opened to the public for the 1910–11 summer season.

As the old station (renamed "Mar del Plata Norte") remained active, the new station would be only used during the summer seasons. It had two large platforms, the main building, a post warehouse, and a signal cabin. When the new station opened, all the trains that arrived to the old station were reprogrammed to make their arrival to the South station. It totalized four services per day, including the two express services. Nevertheless, a few days before the inauguration, the BAGSR requested the Government that only the express services arrived to the new station, due to the other three trains programmed had to end their routes in Miramar and could not change their path to the south station.

The request was approved and therefore only the express services stopped at the new station.

=== Expansion (1865–1899) ===
The expansion of the BAGSR since its inauguration until the 1890s was considerably high. Below are detailed some of the main cities reached by the railroad during this period.

Branch	Opened	Km
Buenos Aires to Jeppener	14 Aug 1865	77
Jeppener to Altamirano	14 Dec 1865	10
Altamirano to Chascomús	14 Dec 1865	26
Altamirano to Ranchos	1 Mar 1871	24
Ranchos to Gral. Belgrano	19 May 1871	32
General Belgrano to Las Flores	1 Jul 1872	64
Chascomús to Dolores	10 Nov 1874	90
Las Flores to Azul	8 Sep 1876	109
Dolores to Maipú	7 Dec 1880	68
Maipú to Ayacucho	7 Dec 1880	62
Azul to Olavarría	15 Mar 1883	43
Ayacucho to Tandil	19 Aug 1883	63
Olavarría to General La Madrid	1 Oct 1883	93
Gral. La Madrid to Bahía Blanca	7 May de 1884	261
Tandil to Benito Juárez	8 May 1885	85
B. Juárez to Tres Arroyos	2 Apr 1886	89
Maipú to Mar del Plata	26 Sep 1886	129
Merlo to Lobos	21 Jun 1890	64
Lobos to Saladillo	21 Jul 1890	87
Temperley to Cañuelas	12 Mar 1890	47
Las Flores to Tandil	1 Aug 1891	151
Tres Arroyos to Bahía Blanca	2 Dec 1891	192
Olavarría to Loma Negra	21 Aug 1893	7
Cañuelas to Las Flores	1 May 1892	114
Ayacucho a Balcarce	24 Feb 1892	88
Balcarce to Quequén	1 Aug 1892	105
Quequén to Necochea	1 Aug 1892	2
Cañuelas to Lobos	1 Aug 1892	33
Saladillo to General Alvear	1 Nov 1897	48
Lobos to Navarro	1 Jan 1898	24
Lobos to 25 de Mayo	10 Jan 1898	108
25 de Mayo to Bolívar	27 Jun 1898	124
Bolívar to Guaminí	27 Jul 1898	155
Guaminí to Saavedra	27 Jul 1898	134
Choele Choel to Cipolletti	1 Jun 1899	214

Since 1884 the BAGSR presented drafts to extend the tracks from Dolores to Mar de Ajó (Atlantic coast of Buenos Aires Province) but this project would not be carried out.

In 1885 the Government granted Dávila y Compañía the construction of a tram line that departing from Olavarría station, ended in the San Jacinto quarry (operated by the same company). This line would be transferred by Dávila to the BAGSR in 1889 and opened to public in 1893.

In 1908 the branch from General Guido to Juancho (with a stop in General Madariaga) that finally reached Vivoratá in 1912. Other lines opened were Bosques-Berazategui, Neuquén-Zapala and Álvarez Jonte-Las Pipinas among others, totalizing 6,082 km until then.

=== Temperley station ===
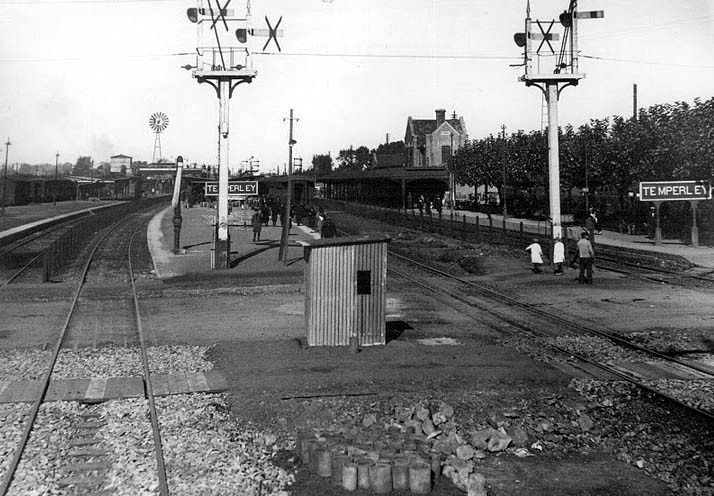
Temperley station in 1925, with the Railway signalling system clearly displayed.

The foundation of the city of La Plata contributed to the development of the railroad system. The Buenos Aires Western Railway built a line from that city to Haedo, crossing the Province from South to West.

The managers of the BAGSR saw the opportunity to make a combination between both railways to connect the Constitución and La Plata stations and enter into competition with the Buenos Aires and Ensenada Port Railway that had a service to La Plata. The managers of Western Railway also showed their interest to connect both lines.

Therefore, in February 1884 a junction between José Mármol and Temperley station was opened. This junction allowed passengers and freight services to run between Constitución and La Plata. A new Temperley building station would be inaugurated in 1888.

=== Extensions ===
In 1906 the BAGS proposed an extension of the line from Zapala, 115 km from the Chilean border, across the Andes to the town of Lonquimay in Chile. Due to lack of funds the line was never built. This would have provided a rail link between the two countries in addition to the Transandine Railway, connecting Mendoza in Argentina with Los Andes in Chile, which was opened in 1910.

Other mainline services included those from Buenos Aires via Bolivar to Carhué, via Maipú to Tandil, via Chas and Ayacucho to Necochea, and services from Bahía Blanca to Toay in La Pampa Province and to Huinca Renanco in Córdoba Province.

=== Partido del Tuyú ===
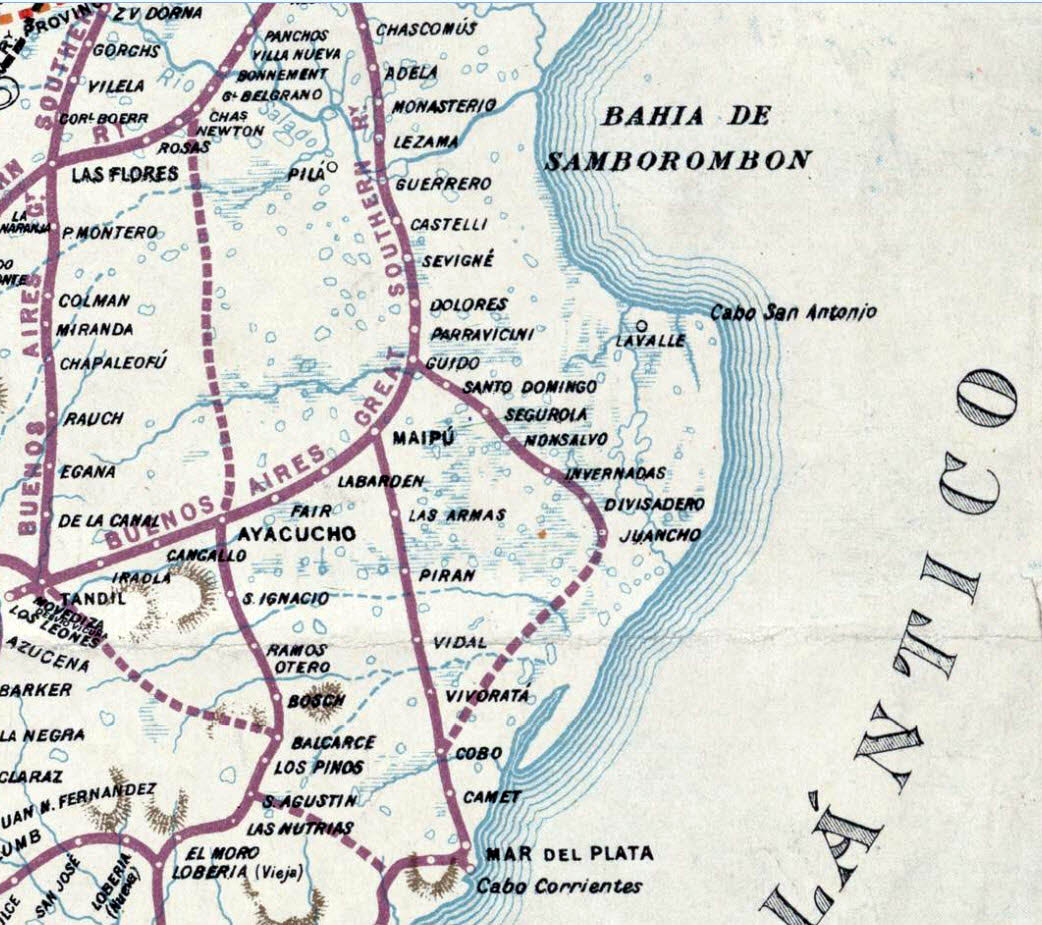
Map from 1911 that shows the Gral. Guido–Juancho branch built by the BAGSR. It dotted line, the project to entend it to Cobo, on the tracks to Mar del Plata, which was not carried out

Although the BAGSR connected Constitución to Mar del Plata, the agricultural producers that lived next to the Atlantic coast were forced to make long trips driving their cattle to the BAGSR stations so there was not any railway line that ran next to the coast. For that reason they requested the BAGSR to build a branch so they could commercialise their goods avoiding so long trips. Furthermore, one of those producers sold part of his lands to the company could build there the "Divisadero" station (today, General Madariaga), located on the km 71,68 of the branch from General Guido.

That branch built from Gral. Guido reached Juancho on November 7, 1907. By 1912 the tracks were extended to Vivoratá (with three intermediate stations built), where it connected with the main line Constituación – Mar del Plata, making it an alternative way for trains between both points in case there was a problem on the main path.

On economic grounds, the coming of the train helped the zone to increase its production. Apart from cattle, producers commercialised apples and firewood, for which some small branches were built. One of those branches reached the point where the intersection of RP 11 and RP 74 is placed today, very close to the entrance to Pinamar. Nevertheless, most of those branches would be lifted in the 1940s.

=== Growth ===
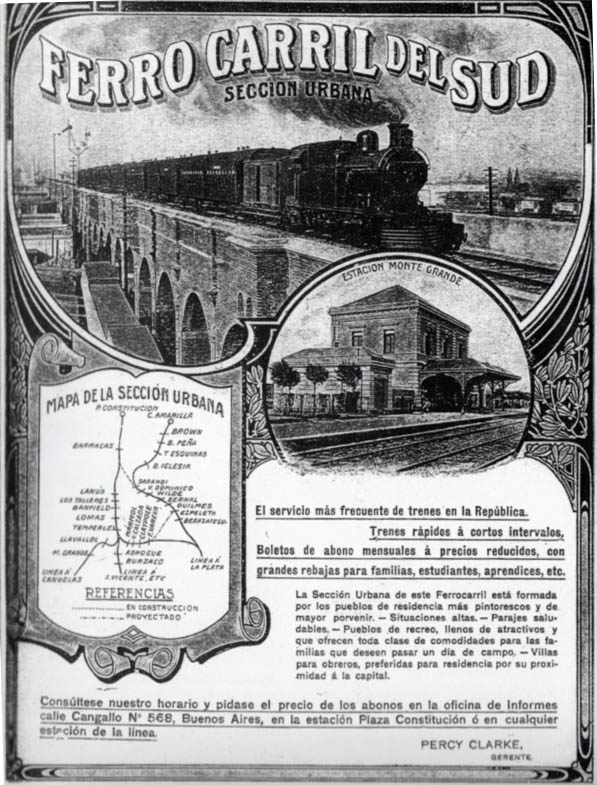
Advertisement for the urban services, c. 1913

By 1930 the company had become a great corporation, probably the largest in the region. Its assets included 8,000 km of tracks, 504 stations, 857 steam locomotives, 955 carriages, 16,602 coaches and more than 30,000 employees. The Ferrocarril del Sud also contributed to the development of several cities of Buenos Aires Province. The railway communicated the suburban areas with the Capital city, carrying agricultural products to the ports of Buenos Aires, Necochea and Bahía Blanca. The company and its subsidiaries also operated a fruit farm in Río Negro Province, an energy station in Bahía Blanca, the Club Hotel of La Ventana and another hotel in Miramar.

The company also built the Ingeniero White port and a dock with capacity for four steamships. Along with other British-owned railroad companies, BAGSR took part in the "Compañía Ferrocarriles de Petróleo" in Comodoro Rivadavia, where the companies were supplied fuel oil for their locomotives.

The BAGSR reached its peak during the last years of the 1920s. Nevertheless, the increase of costs, the devaluation of the Argentine Peso and the increasing in the road traffic, resulted in declining profits for the company.

After then president of Argentina Juan Domingo Perón signed the nationalization of the Argentine railways, the Buenos Aires Great Southern Railway was renamed "Ferrocarril General Roca".

=== Ports ===
Puerto Ingeniero White, one of ports of Bahía Blanca, was built by the company who installed two grain elevators there in 1908 to cope with the increasing grain traffic, and constructed a jetty to provide berthing for four steamships. Together with the other British-owned railways, the company had a financial interest in the Compañía Ferrocarriles de Petróleo in Comodoro Rivadavia whose wells supplied a large proportion of the fuel oil used by these railways. The railway controlled and operated the South Dock in Buenos Aires, at the mouth of the Riachuelo River.

=== Traffic ===
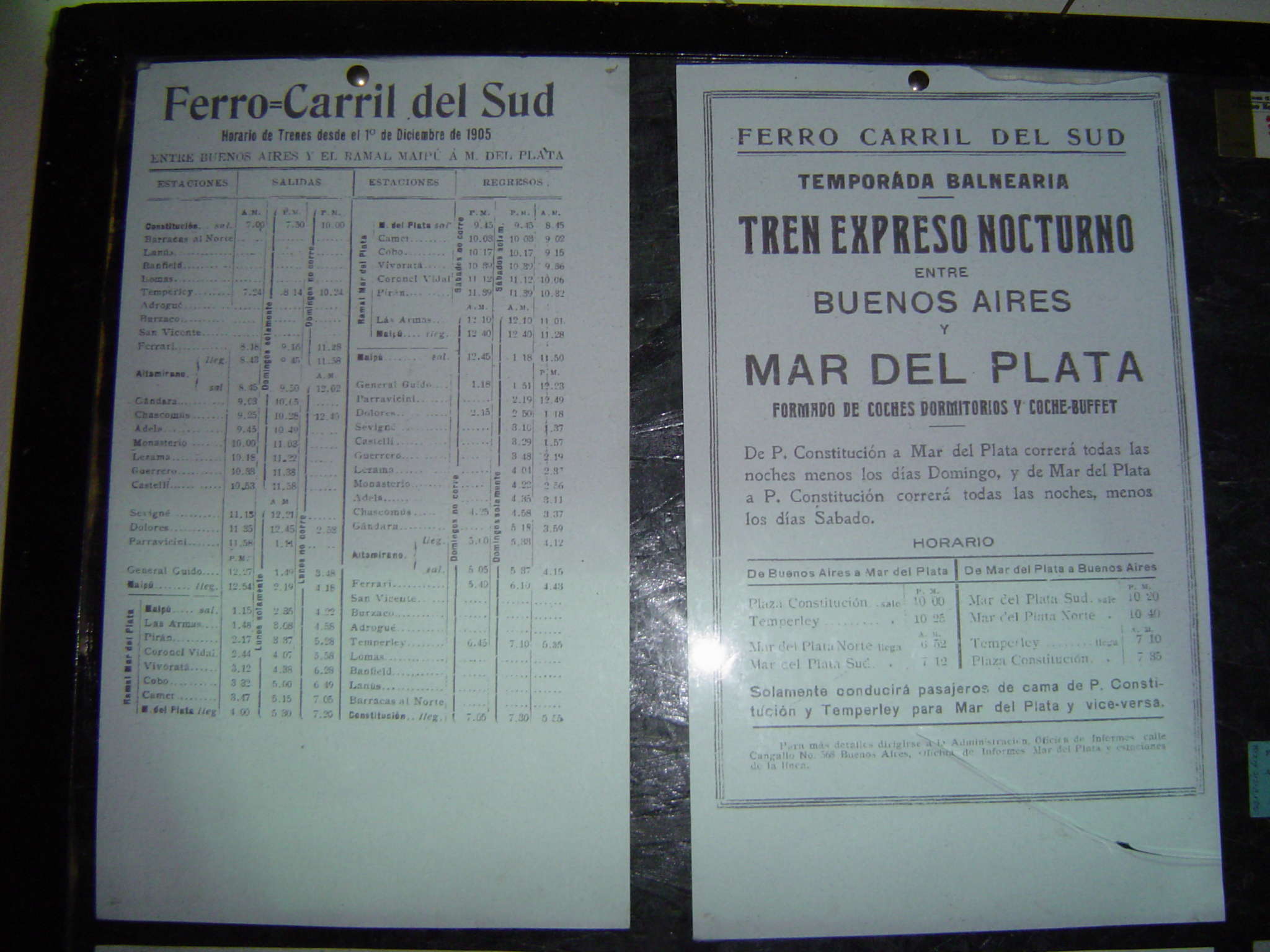
Train schedule between Buenos Aires and Mar del Plata, December 1905.

Much of the goods traffic, including the movement of grain, livestock, fruit from the valley of the Rio Negro, was seasonal, as was the summer tourist traffic to Mar del Plata, Miramar and Necochea. Apart from the suburban services around Buenos Aires and Bahía Blanca, the main traffic flow was between these two cities and beyond by three routes: the direct line via Las Flores, Olavarría and Coronel Pringles; a variant of this from Olavarría through General La Madrid and Saavedra; or finally via Las Flores and Tres Arroyos. Services beyond Bahia Blanca through the Plaza Huincul oilfield to Zapala in Neuquén Province, at first provided by through coaches on trains to Bahía Blanca, soon developed to the point where it became necessary to run separate complete trains from Buenos Aires.

=== Decline ===
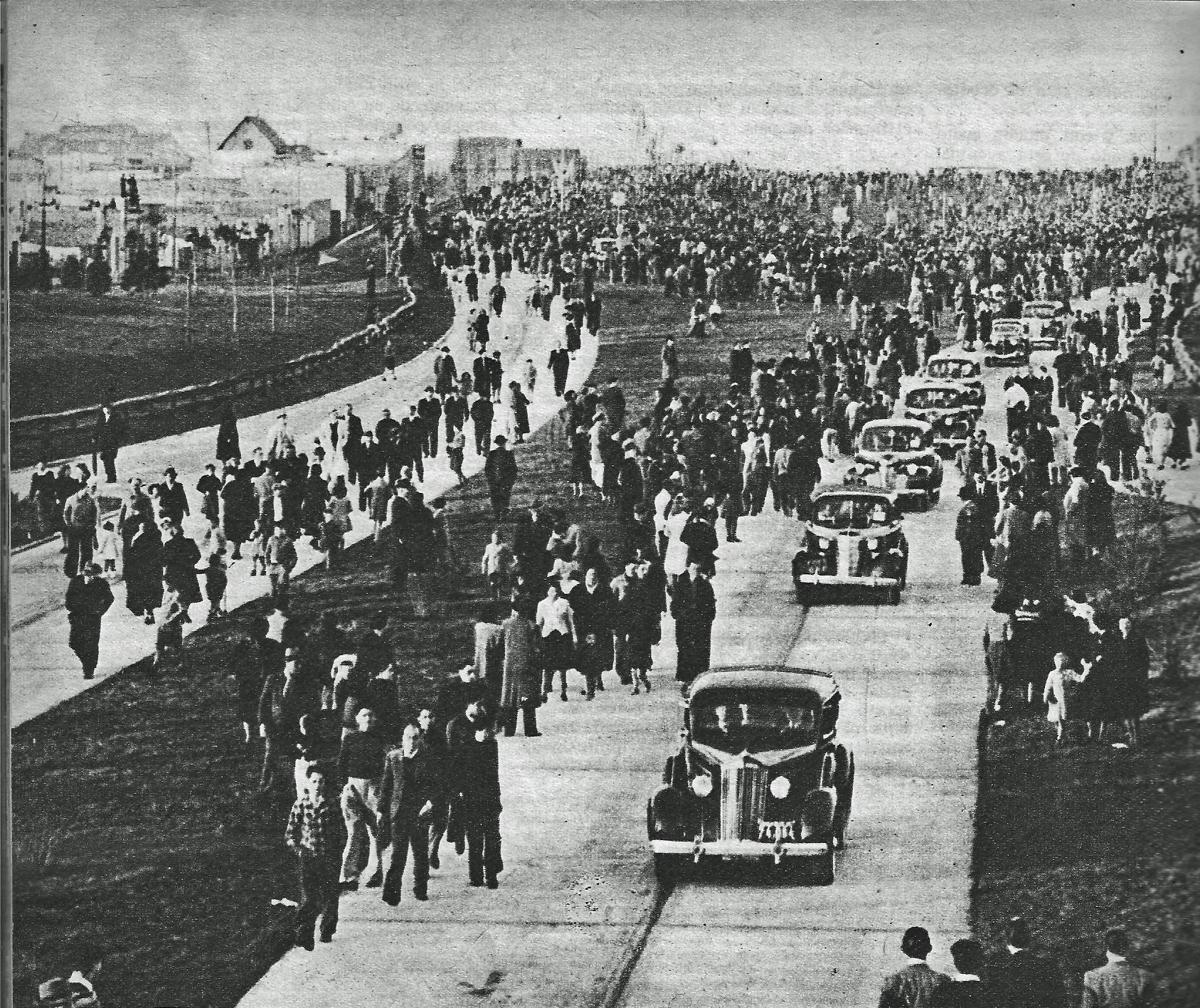
Inauguration of the General Paz Avenue in 1941. The increasing growth of road transport contributed to the decline of railway in Argentina

Between 1907 and 1914 the railroad companies in Argentina had extended their lines an average of 1,800 km per year (more than any European country in the same period), with a total extension of 33,000 km. When the World War I began, the "Golden Age" of Argentine railways ended. Between 1917 and 1922 only 100 km were built.

The British companies also had to deal with the increasing costs, the decrease of the international commerce and the workers syndicates. Marcelo T. de Alvear (elected President of Argentina in 1922) encouraged cooperation with the British companies, which recovered from the great post-war depression and increased their profits 5% per year since 1921 (and 9% since 1924).

Nevertheless, the Great Depression of the 1930s, together with the government's plan to construct an extensive road network for motor transport, created an increasingly difficult environment for the British-owned railway companies in Argentina. To implement the program, the government established the Dirección Nacional de Vialidad, an agency responsible for the development, planning, and maintenance of national roads.

The growth of motor transport led to a substantial decline in railway investment. As new roads were constructed—some running parallel to existing railway lines—cars, buses, and lorries increasingly competed with rail services. The expansion of the road network, promoted by the national government partly to reduce the railways' dominance of the transport sector, placed further pressure on the British-owned companies.

Except during the Second World War, most steam locomotives—nearly all of which had been manufactured in Britain—burned oil, a fuel in which Argentina was largely self-sufficient. Suitable locomotive coal was unavailable domestically and therefore had to be imported. During the harvest season, the heaviest freight trains, weighing more than 2,000 tonnes, were often hauled by three-section articulated Garratt locomotives.

=== Nationalization ===
When the entire Argentine railway network was nationalised in 1948, during Juan Peron's presidency, the BAGS became part of the General Roca Railway, one of the six divisions of State-owned Ferrocarriles Argentinos. At the same time the Roca Railway absorbed the former state-owned Ferrocarriles Patagónicos that included line from Carmen de Patagones to Bariloche, the 750 mm (2 ft 5 1/2 in) narrow gauge line from Ingeniero Jacobacci to Esquel, affectionately known as La Trochita, and the southern half of the French-owned Rosario and Puerto Belgrano Railway.

== See also ==
- General Roca Railway
- Rail transport in Argentina
