= Ayacucho (disambiguation) =

Ayacucho is the capital city of Huamanga Province, Ayacucho Region, Peru

Ayacucho may also refer to:

== Places ==
=== Argentina ===
- Ayacucho, Buenos Aires, a city in Buenos Aires Province
- Ayacucho Partido, an administrative division of Buenos Aires Province
- Ayacucho Department, San Luis, an administrative division of San Luis Province

=== Peru ===
- Ayacucho Region, an administrative division
- Ayacucho District, a district within the region
- Ayacucho Quechua, the Quechua dialect spoken in the Ayacucho Region
- Ayacucho metro station, a rapid transit station in Lima
- Battle of Ayacucho, a decisive battle in the War of Independence, 9 December 1824

=== Elsewhere ===
- Puerto Ayacucho, a city in Venezuela
- Ayacucho (crater), an impact crater on Mars
- Ayacucho Parish, a parish in Guayaquil, Guayas, Ecuador
