= Sebastián Luna =

Argentine footballer (born 1987)

Personal information
- Full name: Sebastián Luna
- Date of birth: 25 December 1987 (age 38)
- Place of birth: General Belgrano, Argentina
- Height: 1.78 m (5 ft 10 in)
- Position: Midfielder

Team information
- Current team: Boca Unidos

Youth career
- Quilmes

Senior career*
Years	Team	Apps	(Gls)
2008–2009	Quilmes	32	(0)
2009–2012	San Lorenzo	35	(0)
2012–2016	Rangers	31	(0)
2014	→ Universitario (loan)	0	(0)
2014–2015	→ Sarmiento (loan)	44	(5)
2016–2021	Belgrano	61	(2)
2021–2022	Boca Unidos	44	(3)
2023	Gimnasia CdU	31	(3)
2024	Juventud Unida	27	(0)
2025–	Boca Unidos		
- * Club domestic league appearances and goals as of 17:45, 11 June 2025 (UTC)

Sebastián Luna (born 25 December 1987) is an Argentine professional footballer who plays as a midfielder for Torneo Federal A side Boca Unidos.

He was born in General Belgrano, Buenos Aires.
