= Brandsen Partido =

Brandsen Partido de Brandsen
- Department
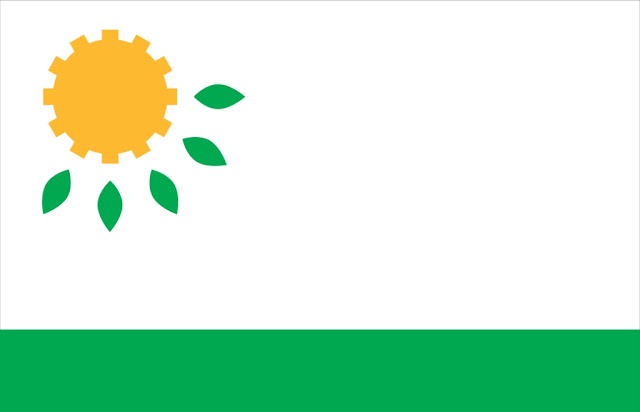
- Flag

- Brandsen Partido in Buenos Aires Province
- Coordinates: 35°09′S 58°16′W
- Country: Argentina
- Established: November 21, 1875
- Founder: Provincial law 994
- Seat: Brandsen

Government
  - Intendant: Fernando Raitelli (PJ)

Area
  - Total: 1,126 km^{2} (435 sq mi)

Population
  - Total: 22,515
  - Density: 20.00/km^{2} (51.79/sq mi)
- Demonym: brandseño
- Postal Code: B1980
- IFAM: BUE028
- Area Code: 02223
- Patron saint: Santa Rita de Cascia
- Website: brandsen.gob.ar

Brandsen is a partido in northeastern Buenos Aires Province, Argentina. In 2001 the city and district had a population of about 22,500 people. It covers an area of 1,126 km^{2} (435 sq mi). The capital is also known as Brandsen.

== History ==
Founded on November 21, 1875 it lies about 70 km (43 mi) from Buenos Aires. The area was named after Argentine colonel, Federico de Brandsen, who was killed in the battle of Ituzaingó in the Cisplatine War.

== Settlements ==
- Brandsen
- Altamirano
- Doyhenard
- El Chaja
- Gobernador Obligado
- Gómez
- Jeppener
- Las Acacias
- Las Golondrinas
- Los Bosquecitos
- Oliden
- Samborombón

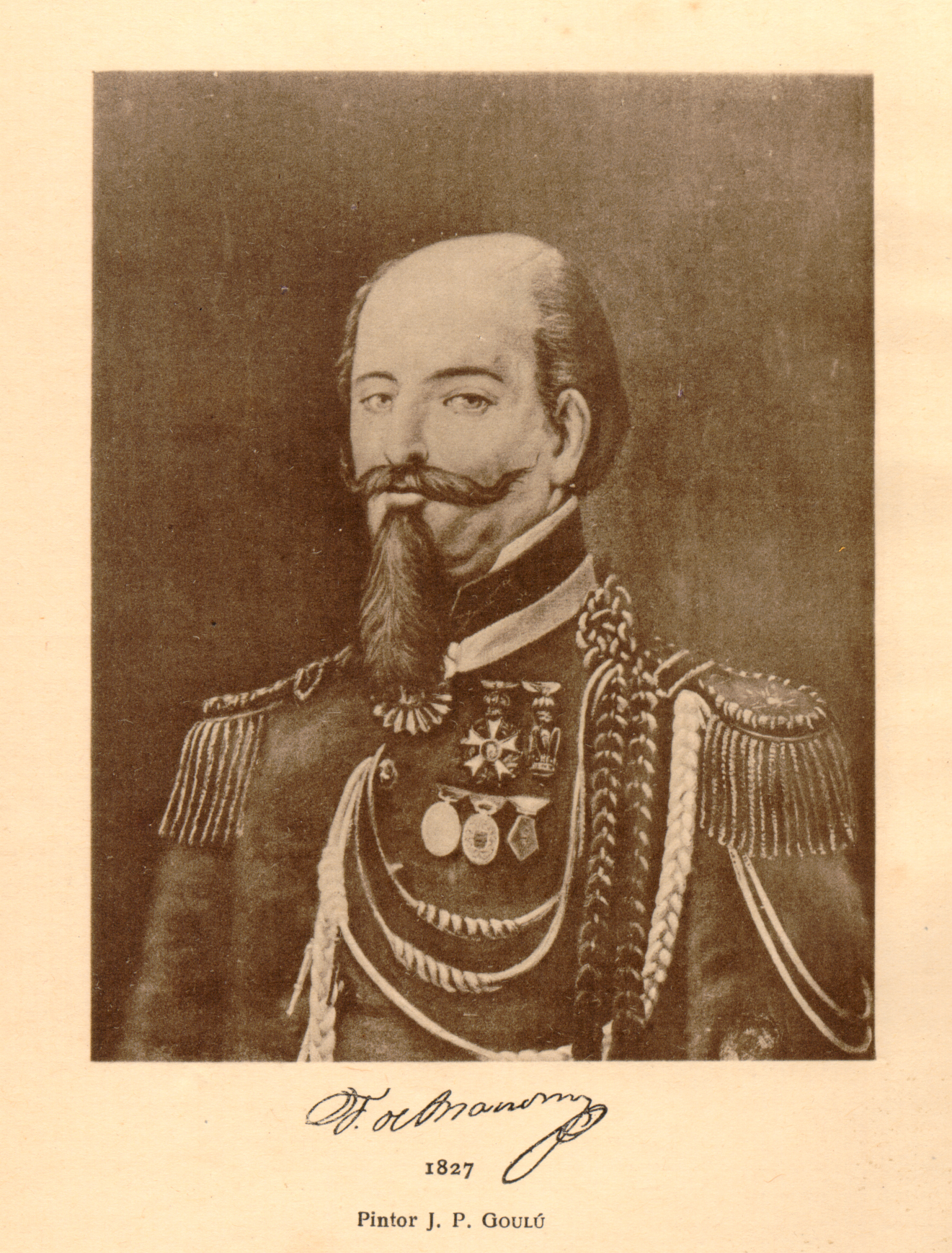
Coronel Brandsen
