= Federico de Brandsen =

French-Argentine colonel (1785–1827)

Carlos Luis Federico de Brandsen
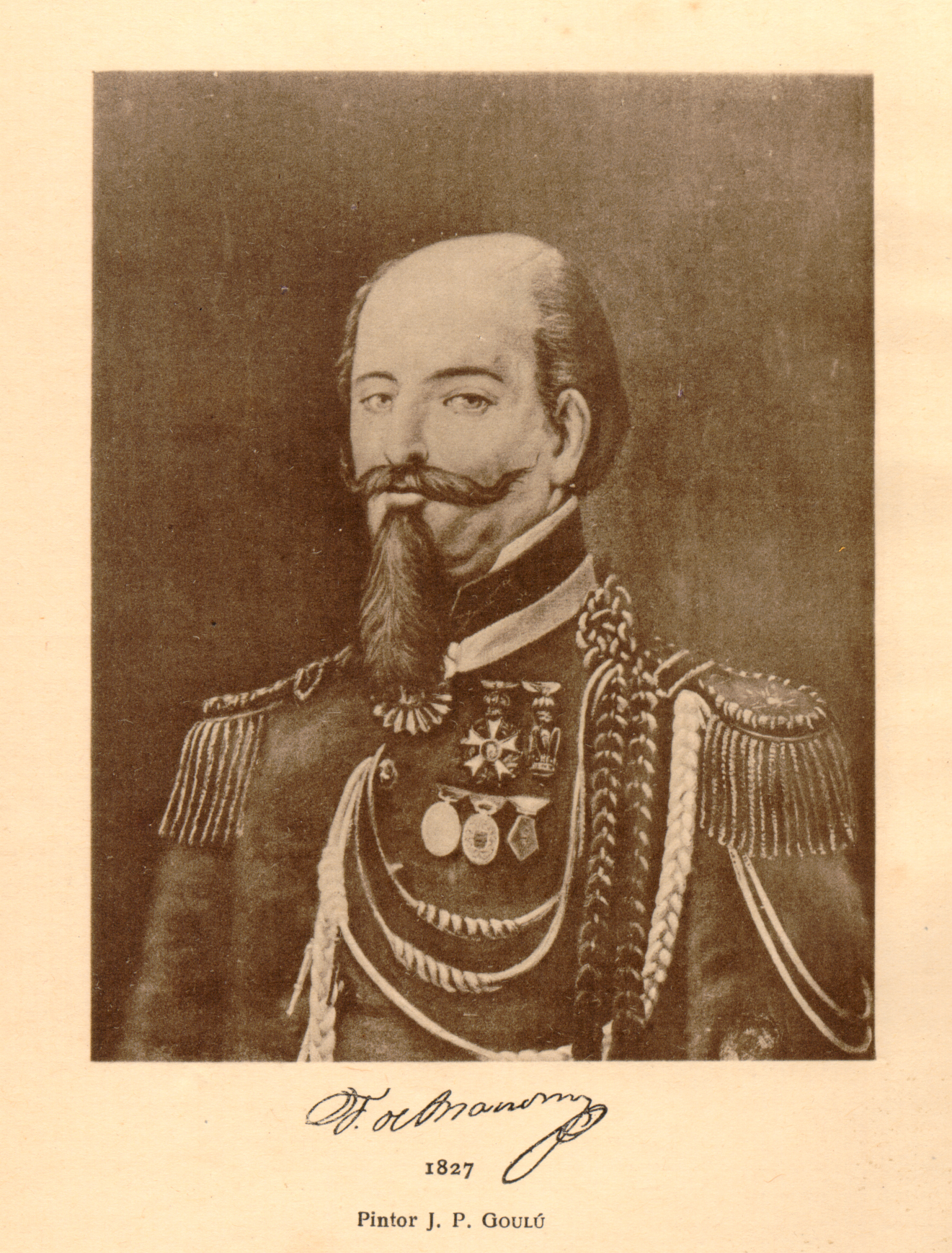
- Born: November 28, 1785; Paris, France
- Died: February 20, 1827 (aged 41); Battle of Ituzaingó (near Passo do Rosário, Brazil)
- Military career
- Allegiance: Italian Kingdom; United Provinces of the Río de la Plata; Chile
- Service years: 1811–1827
- Rank: Colonel
- Unit: Regiment of Mounted Grenadiers
- Conflicts: Argentine War of Independence; Chilean War of Independence; Battle of Ituzaingó

Carlos Luis Federico de Brandsen (Paris, November 28, 1785 – Battle of Ituzaingó, February 20, 1827) was a Colonel of French origin who fought in many of the South American wars of independence and for Argentina in the War with Brazil.

== Napoleonic Wars ==
In 1811 Brandsen joined the army of the Italian Kingdom who fought alongside Napoleon In the Germany campaign he was injured in three separate battles and gained the rank of captain. After the abdication of Napoleon in 1813 and the dissolution of the Italian Kingdom in 1814, Brandsen returned to France where he fought in the Hundred Days, receiving another injury.

== Liberation of Chile and Peru ==
In 1817 the Napoleonic Wars ended. Brandsen met at that time Bernardino Rivadavia (who would later become the President of Argentina in 1826) who convinced him to join the fight to liberate the Americas from the Spanish Empire. He then embarked for Buenos Aires and on December 19, 1817, the United Provinces of South America gave him the rank of Captain of the Regiment of Mounted Grenadiers. Brandsen fought in the Chilean War of Independence under the command of General San Martín. He also fought in the Bío-Bío campaign and the "Expedición Libertadora del Perú".

In the battle of Nazca he distinguished himself alongside Major Juan Lavalle. On November 8, 1820, in Chancay he fought valiantly with a group of 36 men against a force of around 200; after this battle he was made sergeant major.

When San Martín became Protector of Peru, Brandsen was named leader of the regiment of Hussars of the Peruvian Legion of the Guard, with the rank of lieutenant colonel. San Martin had great affection for Brandsen with whom he maintained frequent correspondence. Brandsen was promoted to colonel on September 17, 1822. He commanded his regiment to a victory in Zepita, and as general commander of the Cavalry of the Vanguard of the Army of Peru he fought at Sica-Sica and Ayo-Ayo holding up the hostile pursuit and saving the remainders of the army defeated in those encounters. In 1822 and 1823 he participated actively in the operations against the royal forces.

At the end of 1823 he took the side of President José de la Riva Agüero in the dispute with Antonio José de Sucre. De la Riva Agüero was promoted to brigadier general, but with the dissolution of the army that followed him. Brandsen was put in prison and then Simón Bolívar gave the order for his exile. This order was later rescinded but Brandsen and his wife had already embarked to Chile.

== War with Brazil ==
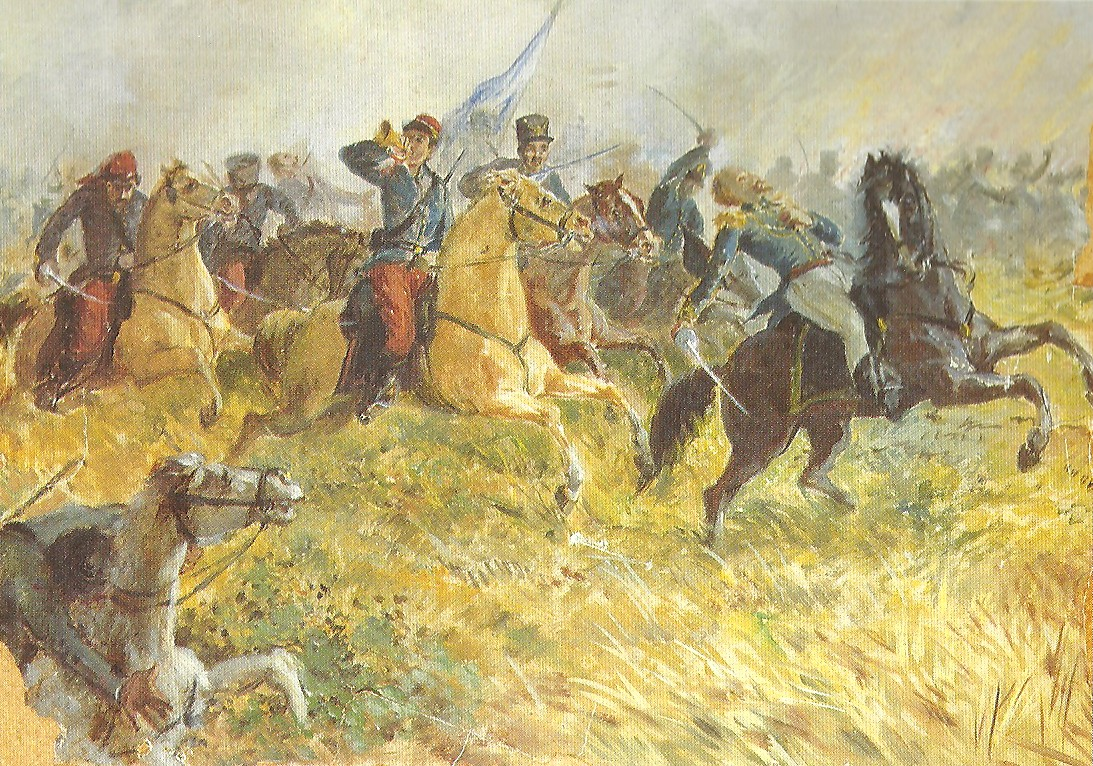
Death of Brandsen at the Battle of Ituzaingó.

At the beginning of March 1825 he embarked with his family on a ship called "Livonia" destined for Chile. After a brief stay in Santiago he returned to the Río de la Plata where the government made him the leader of the 1st Cavalry Regiment with the rank of lieutenant colonel. On February 20, 1827, in the Battle of Ituzaingó his regiment was faced to the Brazilian infantry occupying a fortified position protected by a very deep ditch. General Carlos María de Alvear, ordered him to attack head-on, but Brandsen told him that success was impossible in those conditions. Alvear did not accept his prudent arguments and he charged at the head of his troops, dying heroically. The attack failed, but the battle was won because other colonels such as Tomás de Iriarte, Miguel Estanislao Soler and José María Paz, amended the errors of Alvear. Brandsen was posthumously promoted to colonel; his remains rest in the Cementerio de la Recoleta, in Buenos Aires, in front of the mausoleum of General Alvear.

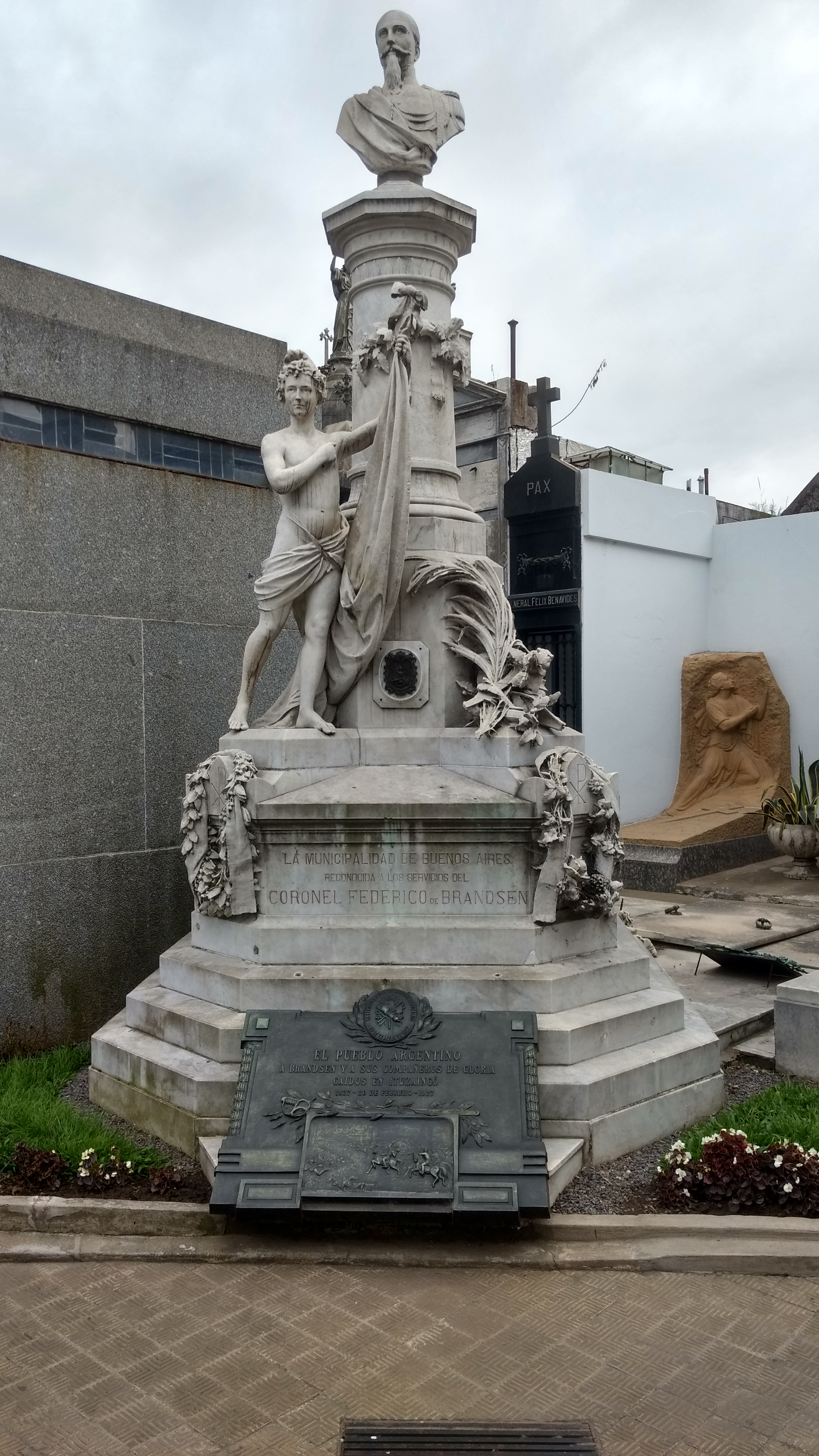
Monument to Federico de Brandsen in Recoleta Cemetery

== Legacy ==
The city of Brandsen and the administrative district Brandsen Partido are named in his honour, there is also a tank regiment named after him and numerous streets in Argentina bear his name. His tomb in Recoleta Cemetery in Buenos Aires is a national monument (No.3039), inaugurated in 1890 with sculpture by Camilo Romairone.

== Bibliography ==
- Aubin, José María. Anecdotario argentino. Buenos Aires: 1910.
- De Gandia, Enrique. Memorias del General Iriarte. Buenos Aires: Compañía General Fabril Editora, 1962.
- Malosetti Costa, Laura. Primeros modernos: arte y sociedad en Buenos Aires a fines del siglo XIX. Buenos Aires: Fondo de Cultura Económica, 2001, p. 128
- Salas. Carlos I. Biografía del Coronel Don Federico Brandsen 1785-1827. Buenos Aires: Compañía Sudamericana de Billetes de Banco, 1909.
- Santa Coloma Brandsen, Federico. Escritos del Coronel Don Federico de Brandsen. Buenos Aires: Compañía Sudamericana de Billetes de Banco, 1910.
