= Chascomús railway station (1865) =

Former railway station in Buenos Aires, Argentina

Coordinates: 35.5709°S 58.0159°W

Chascomús
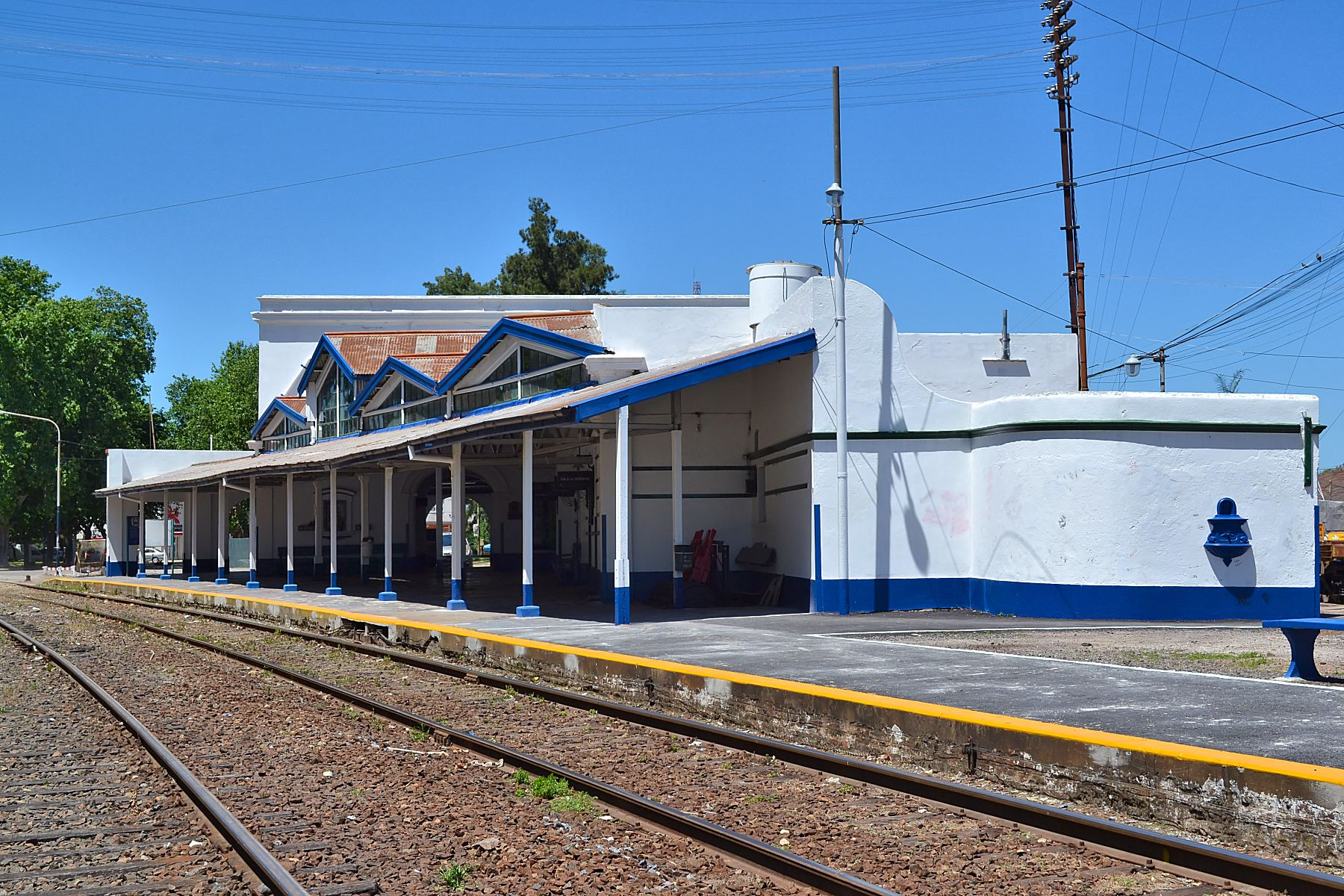
- Chascomús station, North view (2014)

General information
- Location: Belgrano 344, Chascomús, Buenos Aires Province, Argentina
- System: Inter-city
- Owner: Government of Argentina (1865–2016)
- Operator: List: BAGSR (1865–1948); Ferrocarriles Argentinos (1948–1993); Ferrobaires (1993–2014)
- Line: FC Roca
- Distance: 113 km
- Tracks: 2

Construction
- Platform levels: 2

History
- Opened: 1865
- Closed: December 19, 2014; 11 years ago (replaced by Chascomús railway and bus station)
Location

Chascomús is a former railway station in the homonymous city of Buenos Aires Province, Argentina. The station, built and opened in 1865 by the Buenos Aires Great Southern Railway, fell into disuse in December 2014 when new Chascomús railway and bus station was opened.

Nowadays the station building is seat of "Centro Cultural Vieja Estación", a cultural center owned by the Municipality of Chascomús after it was transferred by the Government of Argentina.

== History ==
In August 1861, Edward Lumb, a British entrepreneur, requested the concession of a railway line that would run from Constitución to the city of Chascomús, 120 km from Buenos Aires. Lumb offered $1,000,000 as guarantee to the Government of Buenos Aires. The initiative of Mr. Lumb was debated in the Chamber of Deputies, where it was concluded that railroad was necessary for the development of the Argentina nation. Juan B. Alberdi stated "The railroad will join the Argentine Republic better than all the congresses... without the 'iron road' that connects their extremes, the country will be always divisible and divided against all the Legislative decrees".

Finally, on May 27, 1862, the Buenos Aires Legislature promulgated the Law that authorized President of Argentina, Bartolomé Mitre, to deal a contract with Edward Lumb. The Government demanded an interest rate of 7% on the costs of construction, during 40 years. On the other hand, the company was exempt of paying contributions, taxes and custom fees. The railway company had also to carry the post for free. The Government could expropriate the railway and its assets if the company did not plus a 20% as compensation. The track gauge should be the same than Buenos Aires Western Railway's and the company was able to build a tram line to Monserrat or any other strategic point of the city of Buenos Aires. The contract was officialized by the Government of Argentina on June 12, 1862.

On November 12 the railroad route was approved, according to the maps proposed by the concessionary. The Government wanted the railway to cross San Vicente but the land was not in condition to build a line so the route was moved to La Paz (current Lomas de Zamora), where the field was more solid to extend the tracks. The route would extend from La Paz to Samborombón.

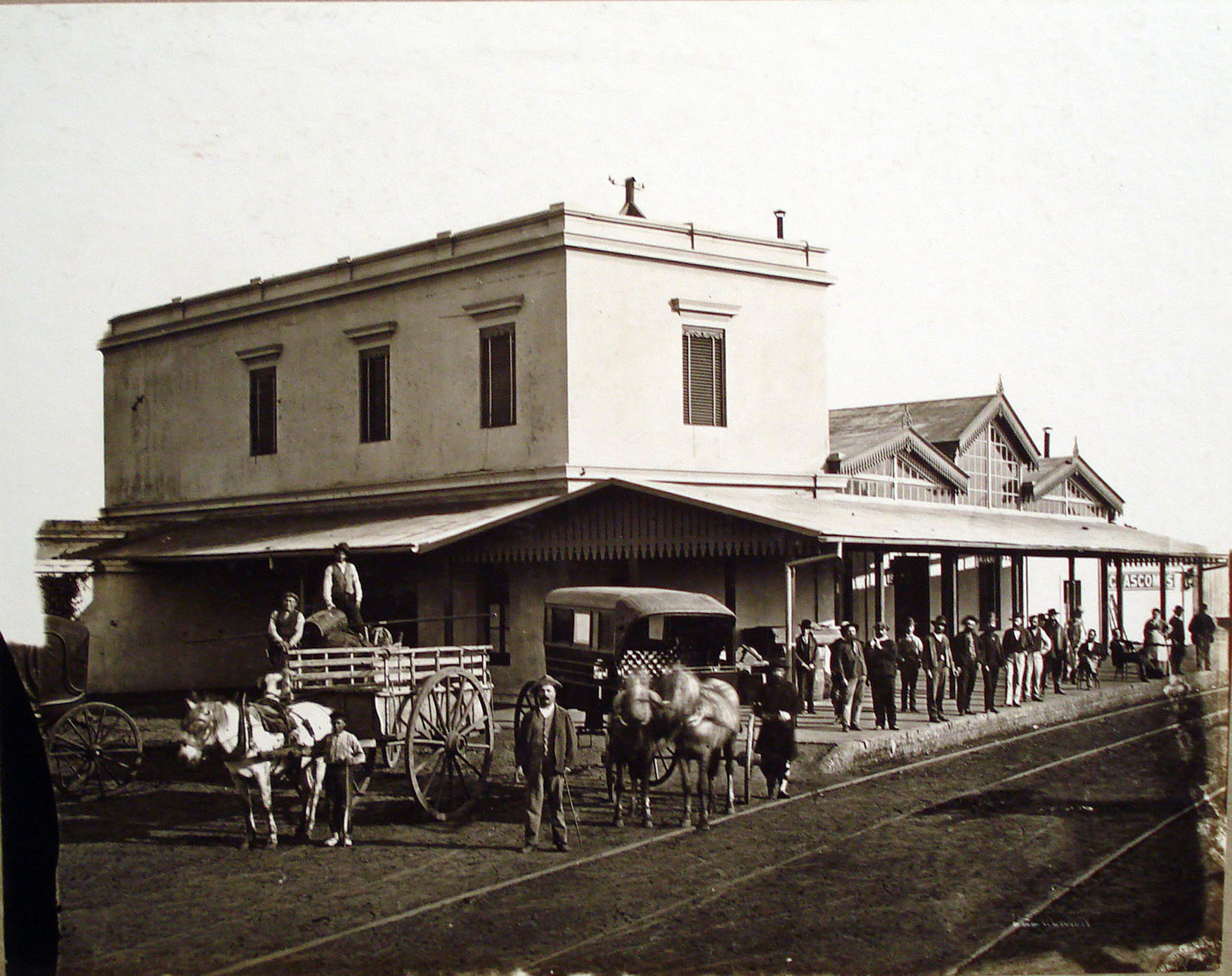
The station in 1875

On March 7, 1864, works began where the Constitución railway station is placed nowadays. By December 1865 the railway had reached Chascomús (113 km).

Chascomús was one of the main stations of the Constitución - Mar del Plata railway service. The BAGSR (then "Ferrocarril del Sud") operated the line until the Railway nationalization of 1948 when the Argentine state purchased all the British and French-owned railway companies. Since then, Ferrocarriles Argentinos ran all the services to Mar del Plata until 1993 when the Province of Buenos Aires took over the services through its company Ferrobaires and has been running services to date.

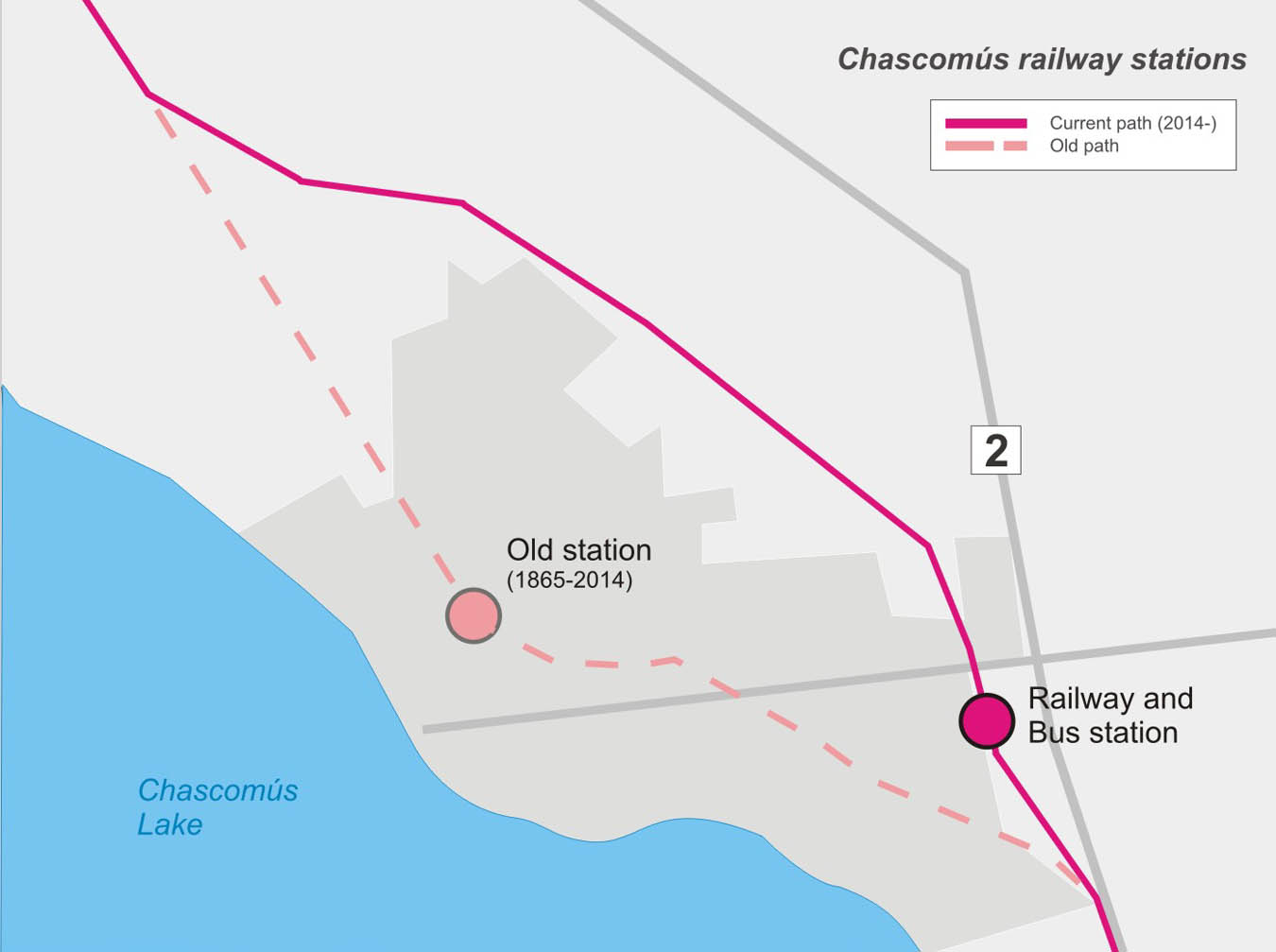
Location of the current Chascomús station indicating the train route. In dotted line, the old path that crossed the city

Nevertheless, the original route to Mar del Plata crossed downtown Chascomús, with more than 17 level crossings. That meant trains had to run at very low speed when crossing Chascomús in order to prevent accidents, generating significant delays. To end this, the local Government projected a new route for the tracks, moving them to a suburban area of the city, with only two level crossings projected. Finally, four level crossings were allowed to be opened.

Works to move tracks were committed to Spanish company COMSA EMTE in 2013. When the Chascomús railway and bus station was concluded at the end of 2014, the old station was closed.

In August 2016, it was announced that the historic station, considered one of the city landmarks, would be transfer to the Municipality of Chascomús. The local municipality established a cultural center in the old station building.

== Operators ==
Chascomús was an intermediate stop of the Buenos Aires to Mar del Plata railroad service. The companies that operated the line and station were:

Company	Period
(United Kingdom) Buenos Aires Great Southern Railway	1865–1948
(Argentina) Ferrocarriles Argentinos	1948–1993
(Argentina) Ferrobaires	1993–2014

== See also ==
- Chascomús railway and bus station

=== Bibliography ===
- López, Mario (1991). Historia de los Ferrocarriles de la Provincia de Buenos Aires: 1857–1886. Buenos Aires: Ediciones Lumiere.
