= Oliden, Buenos Aires =

Oliden
- Location in Argentina
- Coordinates: 35°10′S 57°57′W
- Country: Argentina
- Province: Buenos Aires
- Partido: Brandsen
- Established: 1914
- Elevation: 19 m (62 ft)

Population (2001 census [INDEC])
  - Total: 198
- CPA Base: B 1981
- Area code: +54 2223

Oliden is a localidad and a small rural community in Brandsen Partido in Buenos Aires Province, Argentina.

== Population ==
According to the 2001 census, the population count was 198.
