= Brandsen =

- Location in Argentina
- Coordinates: 35°10′S 58°13′W
- Country: Argentina
- Province: Buenos Aires
- Partido: Brandsen
- Elevation: 17 m (56 ft)

Population (2001 census [INDEC])
  - Total: 16,732
- CPA Base: B 1980
- Area code: +54 2223
- Climate: Cfa

Brandsen is a town in Buenos Aires Province, Argentina. It is the head town of the Brandsen Partido.

== History ==
The city built up around a railway station named Coronel Brandsen which was named after Colonel Federico de Brandsen, who fought in the liberation of Chile and Peru and died heroically at the battle of Ituzaingó on February 20, 1827, in the war with Brazil.

The city held the "Brandsen Rock Todo El Año" in 2007, as well as the "Desfile De Carnaval Brandsen" in February and March., the "Santa Rita De Cascia" festival and many other festivals in May and "Campo Brandsen", a camp where the younger people go to play many different sports.
