= Gómez, Argentina =

Gómez
- Location in Argentina
- Coordinates: 35°04′S 58°10′W
- Country: Argentina
- Province: Buenos Aires
- Partido: Brandsen
- Elevation: 22 m (72 ft)

Population (2001 census [INDEC])
  - Total: 335
- CPA Base: B 1983
- Area code: +54 2223

Gómez is a town in Brandsen Partido in Buenos Aires Province, Argentina. It is located in km marker 38 of National Route 215.

== Population ==
According to the last census the population count was 335 (2001 census [INDEC]) which represents a growth of 58.7% over 211 (1991 census [INDEC]) the previous census.

== Gómez or Estación Gómez ==
This town is misnamed Estación Gómez, as with many towns. Even figure on posters and access roads to it and in telephone directories, for example.
