= Leandro Testa =

Argentine footballer

Personal information
- Full name: Leandro Guido Testa
- Date of birth: 24 March 1976 (age 50)
- Place of birth: General Belgrano, Buenos Aires, Argentina
- Height: 1.76 m (5 ft 9 1/2 in)
- Position: Defender

Team information
- Current team: Estudiantes LP (youth coach)

Senior career*
Years	Team	Apps	(Gls)
1996–2002	Estudiantes LP	116	(2)
2002–2004	Nueva Chicago	60	(1)
2004–2005	Arsenal de Sarandí	4	(1)
2006	Nueva Chicago	20	(1)
2007–2010	Ferro Carril Oeste	65	(1)
2010–2013	Nueva Chicago		

Managerial career
- 2013: Nueva Chicago (management)
- 2014–: Estudiantes LP (youth)
- * Club domestic league appearances and goals

Leandro Guido Testa (born March 24, 1976, in General Belgrano, Buenos Aires) is a former footballer from Argentina who played as a defender.

== Football career ==
Testa started out at Estudiantes de La Plata in 1996. He spent 6 years at the club, making 116 appearances during this period. In 2002, he chose to join Nueva Chicago where he indisputably earned a spot in the starting eleven since his arrival. In June 2004 he transferred to Arsenal de Sarandí, but returned to Chicago the following year after only 4 games played with el viaducto. In early 2007, Testa signed for Ferro Carril Oeste.

=== Coaching career ===
In July 2013, after retiring, Testa was appointed in a role at Nueva Chicago's management, as a link between players, coaching staff and leaders. He resigned at the end of the year.

In 2014, Testa began as a youth coach at Estudiantes LP. As of April 2021, Testa was still in the same position.

== See also ==
- Football in Argentina
- List of football clubs in Argentina
