= Chascomús railway and bus station =

Railway station in Buenos Aires

Chascomús
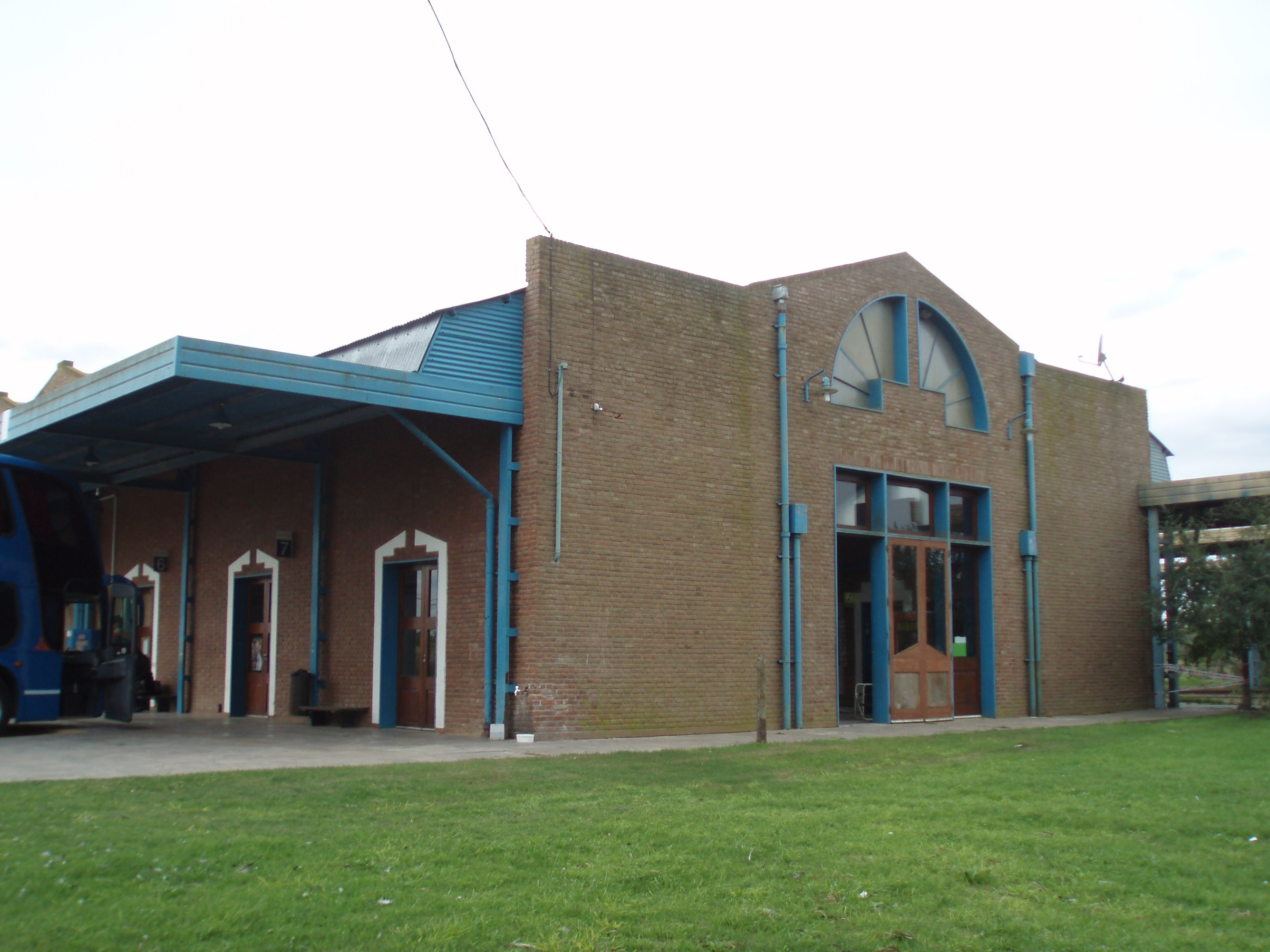
- Side view of the station building in 2014

General information
- Location: Balcarce and González Chávez, Chascomús; Argentina
- Coordinates: 35.5791°S 57.9826°W
- System: Inter-city
- Operator: Trenes Argentinos
- Line: Roca
- Distance: 113 km (70 mi) from Buenos Aires
- Bus stands: 7

Construction
- Platform levels: 5

Other information
- Fare zone: Buenos Aires Province

History
- Opened: December 19, 2014; 11 years ago
Location

Chascomús is a railway station and bus terminus in the homonymous city of Buenos Aires Province, Argentina. Construction began on his station in 1983 when Raúl Alfonsín was President of Argentina but works were interrupted and finally cancelled until they were resumed in 2014 and the station was finished and opened to public on December 19. Station's facilities and services include railway platforms, bus garages, accessible toilets and a coffeehouse.

Therefore, Chascomús original station (inaugurated in 1865) fell into disuse and was closed.

== History ==
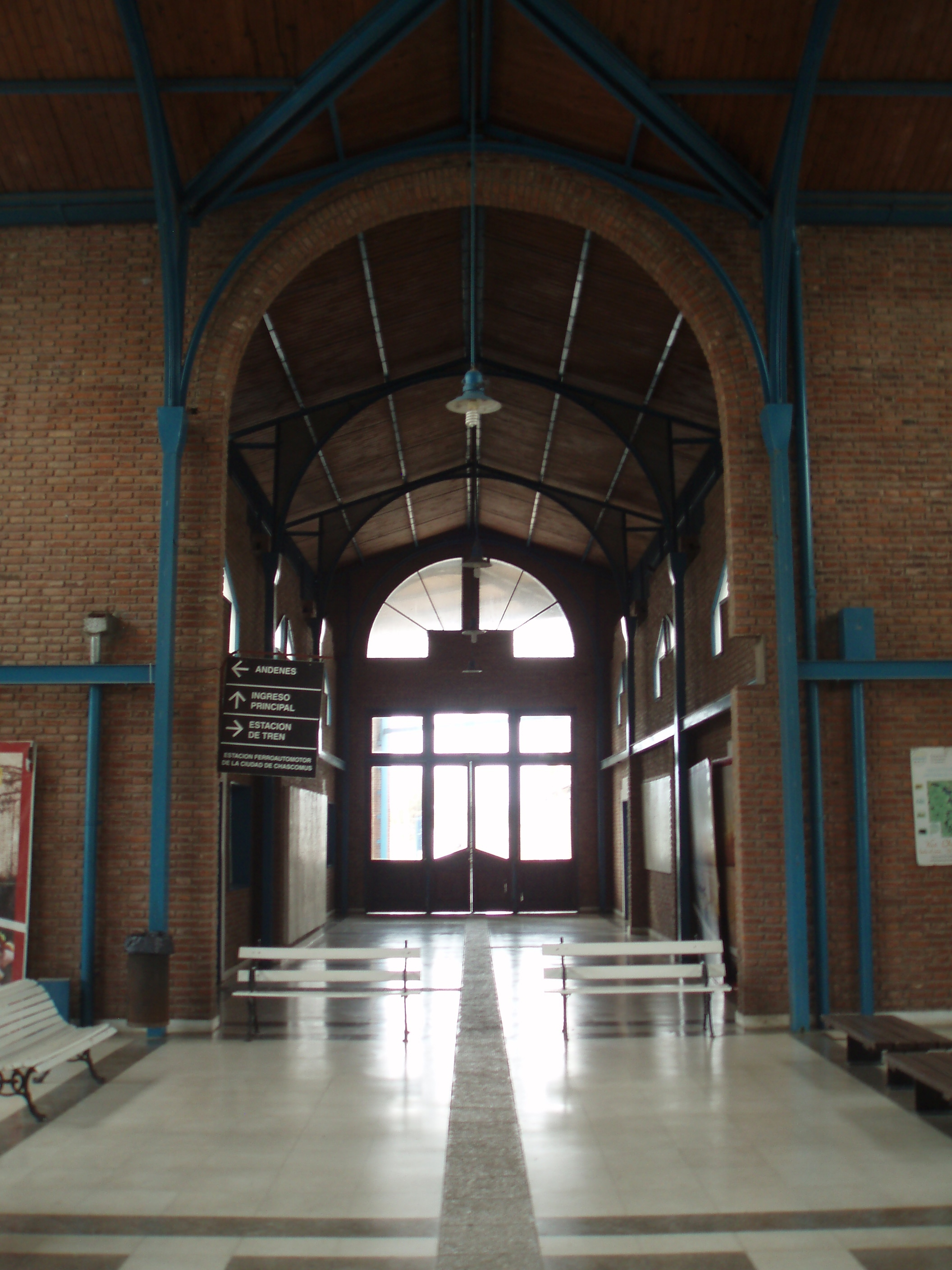
Station hall

Chascomús was one of the main stations of the Constitución - Mar del Plata railway service. The BAGSR (then "Ferrocarril del Sud") operated the line until the Railway nationalization of 1948 when the Argentine state purchased all the British and French-owned railway companies. Since then, Ferrocarriles Argentinos ran all the services to Mar del Plata until 1993 when the Province of Buenos Aires took over the services through its company Ferrobaires and has been running services to date.

Nevertheless, the original route to Mar del Plata used tracks that crossed downtown Chascomús, with more than 17 level crossings existing. That also meant trains had to run at very low speed when crossing Chascomús in order to prevent accidents, generating significant delays in the time of journey. To put an end to this, a new building that operated as both railroad and bus terminus, was projected during the presidency of Raúl Alfonsín. The original project included construction of a new route for the tracks, moving them to a suburban area of the city to prevent accidents. The successive economic crisis in Argentina halted construction, until the station was indefinitely abandoned without being finished.

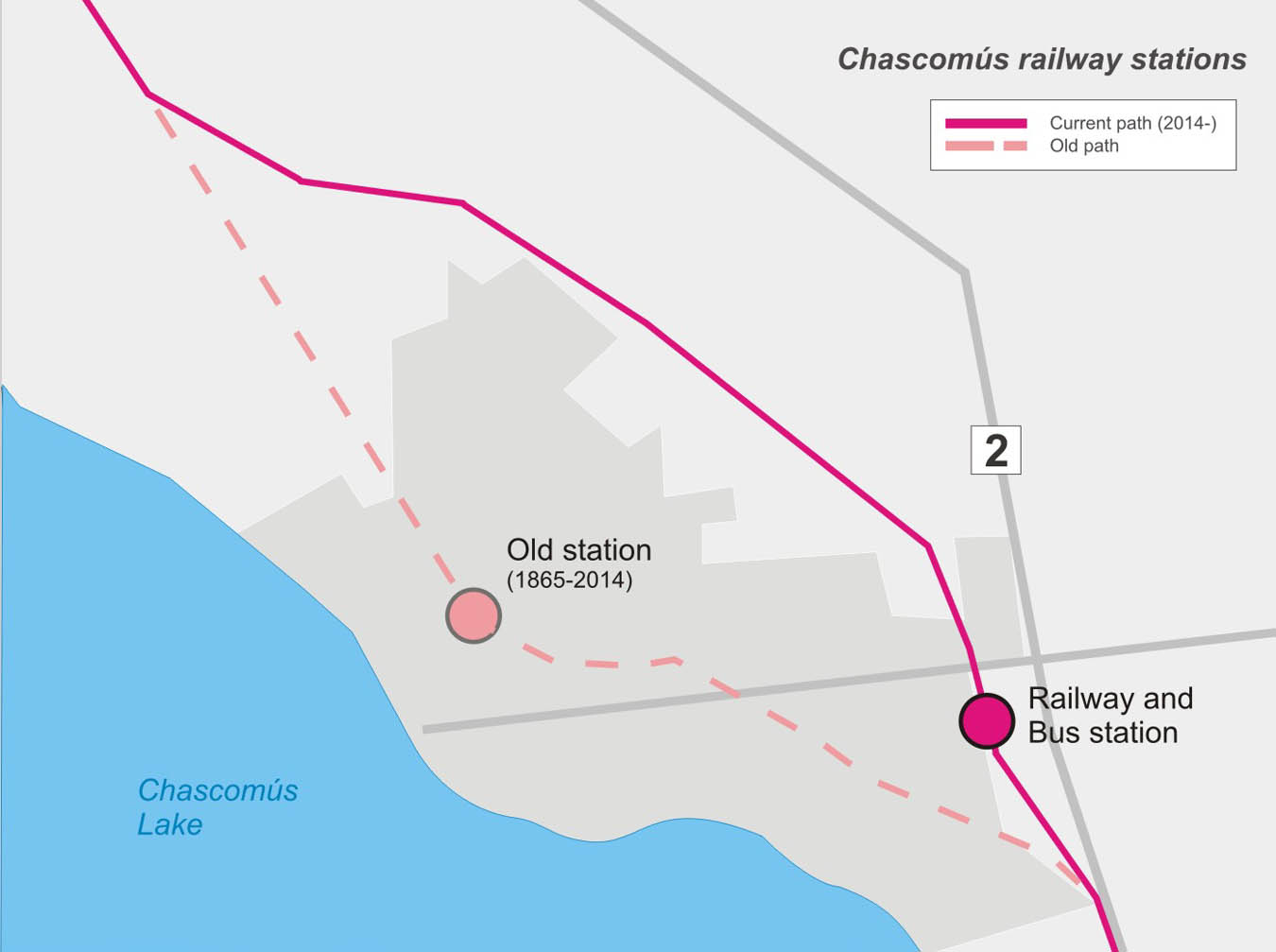
Location of the new station, at the west from the old one

Almost 20 years later, the project was put into discussion again by the Argentine state, with only two level crossings projected. Finally, four level crossings were allowed to be opened.

Works to move tracks were committed to Spanish company COMSA EMTE in 2013. The company built a new line of 20 km length to avoid the big amount of level crossings of the old route.

When the new railway/bus terminus was opened on December 19, 2014, the old station was closed.

In December 2014, brand new trains acquired by the Government of Argentina from the Chinese company CSR, started to run luxury services from Constitución to Mar del Plata, operated by the national state-owned company Operadora Ferroviaria. Standard service continued to be operated by now defunct company Ferrobaires. After some remaining works were finished, the station was officially inaugurated on June 30, 2015.

Nevertheless, in 2015 long-distance services from Constitución to Mar del Plata were suspended due to the bad conditions to run trains. Tracks and sleepers broken, a deficient signalling system, poor visibility in level crossings, and bad conditions of the communication systems, where some of the reasons alleged. In July 2016, local services between Alejandro Korn and Chascomús were cancelled by the Ministry of Transport. In July 2017, the Constitución–Mar del Plata service was reestablished, with four daily services that include a stop in Chascomús.

== Historic operators ==
Company	Period
Ferrobaires (Note: Trenes Argentinos operated luxury services, while Ferrobaires took over standard services.)	2014–2016
Trenes Argentinos	2014–present

== See also ==
- Chascomús railway station (1865)
