= Jeppener =

- Location in Argentina
- Coordinates: 35°16′S 58°12′W
- Country: Argentina
- Province: Buenos Aires
- Partido: Brandsen
- Elevation: 12 m (39 ft)

Population (2001 census [INDEC])
  - Total: 2,142
- CPA Base: B 1986
- Area code: +54 2223

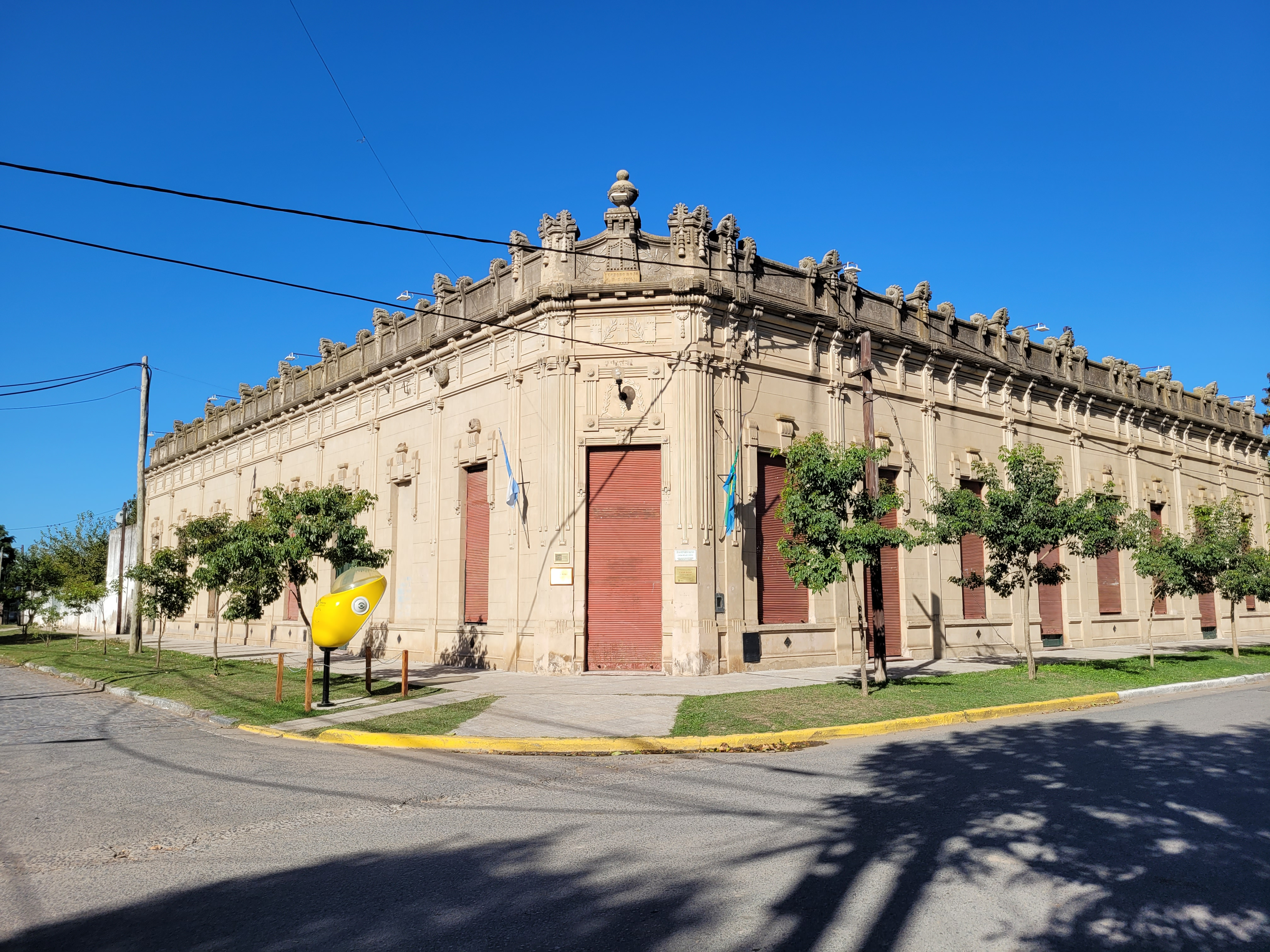

Jeppener is a town in Brandsen Partido in Buenos Aires Province, Argentina.

== Population ==
According to the last census the population count was 2,142 (2001 census [INDEC]) which represents an increase of 26.7% over 1,691 (1991 census [INDEC]) the previous census.
