= General Belgrano Partido =

General Belgrano Partido de General Belgrano
- Department
- location of General Belgrano in Buenos Aires Province
- Coordinates: 35°45′S 58°30′W
- Country: Argentina
- Established: 1 August 1891
- Named for: Manuel Belgrano
- Seat: General Belgrano

Government
  - Intendant: Osvaldo Mario Dinápoli (UCR)

Area
  - Total: 1,843 km^{2} (712 sq mi)

Population
  - Total: 15,381
  - Density: 8.346/km^{2} (21.62/sq mi)
- Demonym: belgranense
- Postal Code: B7223
- IFAM: BUE045
- Area Code: 02243
- Patron saint: Nuetra Señora de la Inmaculada Concepción
- Website: www.gralbelgranet.com.ar

General Belgrano Partido is a partido east of Buenos Aires Province in Argentina.

The provincial subdivision has a population of about 16,000 inhabitants in an area of 1,843 km^{2} (712 sq mi), and its capital city is General Belgrano, which is 162 km (101 mi) from Buenos Aires.

The partido is named after Manuel Belgrano, an Argentine economist, lawyer, politician and military leader.

== Economy ==
The economy of Gral. Belgrano partido is dominated by agriculture.

== Settlements ==
- Bonnement
- Chas
- General Belgrano
- Gorchs
- Ibáñez
- Newton
