= Ayacucho, Buenos Aires =

City in Buenos Aires Province, Argentina

Ayacucho
- Location in Argentina
- Coordinates: 37°08′S 58°28′W
- Country: Argentina
- Province: Buenos Aires
- Partido: Ayacucho
- Founded: 22 June 1866
- Elevation: 74 m (243 ft)

Population (2010 census [INDEC])
  - Total: 17,364
- CPA Base: B 7150
- Area code: +54 2296
- Climate: Cfb

Ayacucho is a city in eastern Buenos Aires Province, Argentina; the administrative seat of Ayacucho Partido. The city is located on the bankAgriculture Arroyo Tandileoufú. Agriculture and ranching are central to the economy, along with agrotourism.

== Toponym ==
The city is named after the Battle of Ayacucho (December 9, 1824), which took place in Peru. That was the final battle for the independence of Argentina and hispanic South America.

The settlement was founded on 22 June 1866 by Zoilo Miguens.

== Geography ==
The city is located 305 km South of Buenos Aires, 150 km North-West of Mar del Plata, 157 km West of Pinamar and 67 km East of Tandil. The partido is traversed by Provincial Routes 29, 74, 50 and 60, and by National Route 2.

== Main Parks and Attractions ==
- Plaza San Martín, located in downtown, is the main city square.
- Plaza Colón, where Solanet Ave meets Colón Ave, is regarded as one of the richests squares in Argentina in terms of botanical diversity. It was designed by French architect and landscape designer Carlos Thays. A statue of Christopher Columbus can be found at the centre of the square. There is also a statue of Aimé Tschiffely and his famous horses Gato and Mancha.
- Plaza Belgrano, at Dindart Ave and Murgier, is a small park beside the bus terminal.
- Plaza Sarmiento, at Miguens Ave and Colón Ave, is a recreation park offering outdoor play sets for children.
- Chacra Municipal Juan Manuel de Rosas, located at the intersection of Gato y Mancha and Libertad Ave, is a 42 ha farm where equestrian skills competitions take place all year round.
- Centro Recreativo Comunal Club Atlético Independiente, located at Ruta 50 and San Martin, is a 42 ha park. Not only does it serve as a camping place, but also a swimming pool, grills, football, rugby and polo fields are available to the public. A large house at the entrance serves as a pool bar, where drinks are served. A party house for rent and a hotel can also be found inside the park. A pedestrian trail including several bridges along the Arroyo Tandileofú lead to an artificial lake at the back of the park.
- Club de Pesca, where Pasteur meets Poderoso, is a two-block camping place. A party house, football fields and paddle courts are available for rent.
- Centro Cultural Dr. Pedro Solanet, at Dindart Ave and Moreno, is the main tennis club in town. A swimming pool is available to members only.
- Cycles Club, at Moreno and Simonetti, is a paved cycling track where regional competitions take place regularly.
- Tiro Federal, at the end of Bavio Ave, is a target practice place. The place is best known for its swimming pool, but tennis courts and a camping place can also be found here.
- Museo Histórico Regional, at Italia Ave and Libertad Ave, is a regional museum. Paleontological pieces, local antiques and an old steam locomotive are on exhibition.
- Aero Club, at Newbery Ave and Sarmiento, is the local aviation school. Flight baptisms are open to the public regularly. A popular swimming pool can be found here.
- Centro de Educación Física No. 32, at the cross of Miguens Ave and Dindart Ave, offers a short-course (25 m) heated pool all year round. A small pool with warmer water, as well as a basketball court, can be found here.
- Estadio Municipal José Antonio Barbieri, at the cross of Sarmiento and 1ero de Mayo, is the main football field.
- Sociedad Rural Vieja, at Solanet Ave and Italia Ave, was the former livestock auction center in town. The place currently serves as an exhibition center. Craft fairs are held here during the Fiesta del Ternero.
- Local clubs Atlético, Defensores, Estrada, Ferroviario, Independiente and Sarmiento, all offer a plethora of recreation facilities.

== Ayacucho and Martín Fierro ==
Martín Fierro is regarded as the pinnacle of the genre of "gauchesque" poetry. The epic poem, by Argentine writer José Hernández, evokes de life of an impoverished gaucho who has been drafted to serve at a border fort, defending the Argentine inner frontier against the native peoples. The only place that is mentioned throughout the whole book is Ayacucho. This gives us a notion of the places where the gaucho lived.

José Zoilo Miguens, the first publisher of the book, was the founder of Ayacucho. This fact currently lets the city of Ayacucho become the center of debate about Martin Fierro. The workshops for investigation, promotion and debate about the universe of Martín Fierro take place in Ayacucho every year.

== See also ==
- Ayacucho (disambiguation)
