= Ayacucho Partido =

Ayacucho Partido de Ayacucho
- Department
- Location of the Partido within Buenos Aires Province
- Coordinates: 37°09′S 58°28′W
- Country: Argentina
- Province: Buenos Aires
- Established: July 19, 1865
- Founder: José Zoilo Miguens
- Seat: Ayacucho

Government
  - Intendant: Emilio Cordonnier (UCR)

Area
  - Total: 6,785 km^{2} (2,620 sq mi)

Population
  - Total: 20,337
  - Density: 2.997/km^{2} (7.763/sq mi)
- Demonym: ayacuchense
- Postal Code: B7150
- IFAM: BUE006
- Area Code: 02296
- Website: www.ayacucho.mun.gba.gov.ar

Ayacucho Partido is a partido in Buenos Aires Province, Argentina.

The provincial subdivision has a population of 19,669 inhabitants in an area of 6,785 km^{2} (2,619.7 sq mi), and its capital city is Ayacucho, which is around 330 km (210 mi) from Buenos Aires.

== Districts ==
- Cangallo
- Udaquiola
- Langueyú
- Solanet
- La Constancia
- San Ignacio District
- Fair District
