= General Belgrano, Buenos Aires =

General Belgrano

- Location in Argentina
- Coordinates: 35°46′S 58°30′W
- Country: Argentina
- Province: Buenos Aires
- Partido: General Belgrano
- Founded: August 1, 1891

Population (2001 census [INDEC])
  - Total: 13,516
- CPA Base: B 7223
- Area code: +54 2243

General Belgrano is a town in Buenos Aires Province, Argentina. It is the administrative seat of General Belgrano Partido. The provincial subdivision has a population of about 16,000 inhabitants in an area of 1,843 sq km (712 sq mi), and General Belgrano, which is located 162 km (101 mi) from Buenos Aires, is considered to be its capital city.

== Notable people ==
- Leandro Testa (born 1976), former footballer
