= Battle of Ituzaingó =

1827 battle of the Cisplatine War

- Part of the Cisplatine War
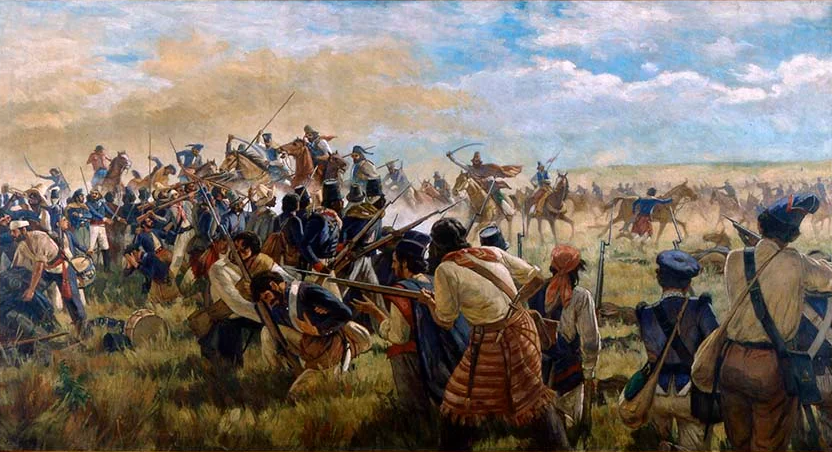
- Brazilian infantry repelling an Argentine cavalry charge, by José Wasth Rodrigues
| Date | 20 February 1827 |
| Location | Near Santa Maria River, southern Brazil 30°14′27″S 54°47′42″W |
| Result | United Provinces victory |

Belligerents
| Empire of Brazil | (Argentina) United Provinces |

Commanders and leaders
| Marquess of Barbacena | Carlos María de Alvear |

Strength
| 6,300 | 7,700 |

Casualties and losses
| 290: 200 killed 90 wounded | 403: 147 killed 256 wounded |
- Location within Rio Grande do Sul

The Battle of Ituzaingó, also known as the Battle of Passo do Rosário, was a pitched battle fought in the vicinity of the Santa Maria River, in a valley of small hills where a stream divided the valley into two.

After a two-year series of continuous sundry skirmishes in the Banda Oriental (present-day Uruguay and Rio Grande do Sul) and along the border of this region with Brazil, the advancing Argentine Army (including Orientals) engaged in combat with the Imperial Brazilian Army.

The battle lasted for about six hours, beginning at around six in the morning of 20 February 1827.

== Background ==
The Banda Oriental was incorporated as a Brazilian province in 1822, when Brazil became independent from Portugal. The centralized government, under the reign of Emperor Pedro I, led to a number of revolts inside Brazil. Seeing a chance to break the rule of a foreign nation over their country, some Orientals raised the flag of rebellion against the Brazilian government in 1825.

At first, the fight did not attract much attention from the Brazilian government, which was dealing with revolts even in Rio de Janeiro at the time. Nevertheless, as the rebellion spread fast, Pedro I had to gather an army by any way that he could to send to Cisplatina (the province's name under Brazilian control).

The Brazilian Army was, at first, led by Pedro I himself. Political problems and the death of Empress Leopoldina forced him to return to the capital without getting close to the battlefield. By December 1826, the command was given to General Felisberto Caldeira Brant, the Marquis of Barbacena.

By then, the appeal the Orientals sent to Buenos Aires brought the United Provinces into the conflict. The Buenos Aires leadership saw a chance to bring the Banda Oriental back into the United Provinces as a province. General Carlos María de Alvear was appointed as commander of the Republican Army.

On January 20, 1827, Alvear moved to the border with Brazil. He attacked some small towns and villages and successfully tried to bring Barbacena to him.

== Battle ==
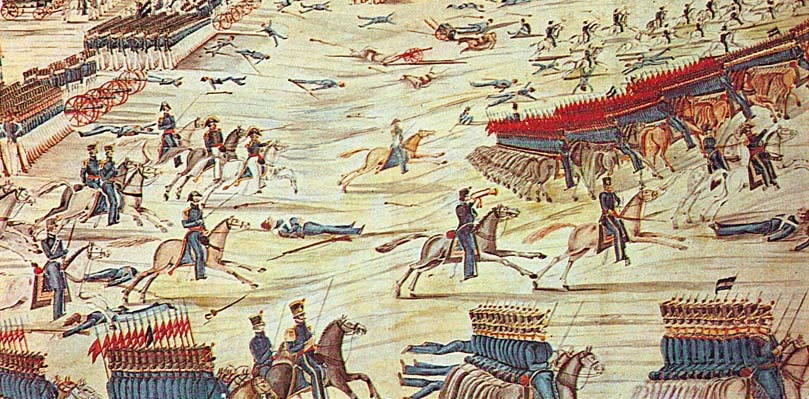
Scene of the battle

By February 18, the Republican Army reached a stream of Santa Maria River. Alvear had previously chosen that place to maximize his advantage in cavalry. The Brazilian Imperial Army arrived in the battlefield the next day. Refusing some objections over the exhaustion of the army, the Marquis of Barbacena prepared his forces for action as soon as possible the following day.

Some historians say that Alvear misled Barbacena to believe that he was pursuing only the rear of the Republican Army. That is why he was anxious to take care of that part of the Republican Army and to fight Alvear's main force in a later battle. Believing so, Barbacena took the offensive and sent his cavalry and infantry toward the 1st Corps of the Republican Army, which was under the command of Oriental leader Juan Antonio Lavalleja.

However, in a report of the battle sent to the Minister of War, the Count of Lajes, Barbacena explains that the local men he had recruited were deserting at a rate of twenty a day because Alvear was carrying out raids against the local populace, attacking their property and burning the fields. The soldiers were eager to fight, but because of Barbacena's caution, which the soldiers thought was excessive, they decided to go back to their homes and families to defend it themselves. After seeing the forces he had so hardly managed to recruit diminishing more and more and in order to avoid further desertions, Barbacena decided to get closer to the enemy and attack.

The Imperial Forces crossed the stream as if to encircle Lavalleja's men. At first, the Oriental cavalry tried to block the passage of the 1st Imperial Army Division. Soon, they were pushed back by the enemy, which managed to take control of the artillery pieces under Colonel Felix Olazabal. Alvear then counterattacked with his cavalry. While he would take care of the 2nd Division on the center of the Imperial Army, Colonel Julian Laguna would attack the extreme left of the Brazilian forces, which were formed by only volunteers. Colonel Soler would lead his men onto the 1st Division. As Alvear planned, the open fields proved to be more suitable for cavalry units than for infantry.

Only the center of the Imperial Army kept its position. The infantry there formed squares to repel any attempt made by 2nd Corps of the enemy cavalry to subdue them. Only when it was clear that the Republican Army could encircle the 2nd Division did it withdraw from the battlefield.

The Republican Army could not pursue the enemy. The lack of proper means made Alvear order his men to put fire to the battlefield and to leave the scene.

The battle ended with a tactical victory for the Republicans since Barbacena could not march on Buenos Aires, as he had planned, but with no strategic gain for either side.

== Aftermath ==
The war went on for one more year with inconclusive frays on land between small groups of men on each side.

The Empire of Brazil achieved naval dominance with the battle of Monte Santiago shortly after the republican triumph in Ituzaingó. On the ground, the cities of Montevideo and Colonia del Sacramento remained under the control of Brazil.

Therefore, also the actions by the Navies played a role in the outcome of the conflict.

"The army is completely devoid of the means to besiege Montevideo more effectively than by the land blockade, a method that experience has proven to be innocuous, as long as there is a predominance of Brazilians at sea. This war is, in its essence, a naval war and the possession of the Banda Oriental and, perhaps, even that of Montevideo, would not mean any advantage for Buenos Aires, as long as the blockade of the river can be maintained by the enemy".

— Ponsonby's letter to George Canning

Speaking about it, José de San Martín was clear about that. He said to Tomás Guido in July 1827:

"Both victories (Juncal and Ituzaingó) can help speed the conclusion of the desired peace; However, I will tell you frankly that, seeing neither of them decisive, I am very afraid that, if the emperor knows - as he should - the state of our pecuniary resources and, above all, that of our provinces, resist to conclude it and, without further prolonging the war for another year, puts us in a very critical situation. In conclusion, if the influence of the British cabinet, together with the precarious situation in which Portugal finds itself, does not decide the emperor to peace, my short lights cannot see a remedy for this situation" .

Among the trophies and equipment captured by the Argentinians, there was the partiture of a march (allegedly written by Brazilian emperor Pedro I, himself an amateur composer), and intended to be used by the victorious Brazilian troops when entering Buenos Aires as conquerors. The march was adopted by the Argentinian Army and today, named "Ituzaingó", is used at military ceremonies to hail the national flag and the President.

Eventually, in 1828 a peace treaty was signed between the Empire of Brazil and the United Provinces that granted independence to the Brazilian Cisplatina province (present-day Uruguay).

Argentinian writer Jorge Luis Borges referenced the battle in his 1942 short story Funes the Memorious.

== Bibliography ==
- Barroso, Gustavo (2000). História Militar do Brasil (in Portuguese). Rio de Janeiro: Biblioteca do Exército.
- Carneiro, David (1946). História da Guerra Cisplatina (in Portuguese). São Paulo: Companhia Editora Nacional.
- Donato, Hernâni (1987). Dicionário das batalhas brasileiras (in Brazilian Portuguese). São Paulo: IBRASA. ISBN 978-85-348-0034-1.
- Duarte, Paulo de Q (1985). Lecor e a Cisplatina 1816-1828. v. 2. (in Portuguese). Rio de Janeiro: Biblioteca do Exército.
- Garcia, Rodolfo (2012). Obras do Barão do Rio Branco. Vol. VI: efemérides brasileiras. Brasília: Fundação Alexandre de Gusmão. ISBN 978-85-7631-357-1.
- Rosa, José María (1972). Historia argentina: Unitarios y federales (1826-1841) (in Spanish). Vol. IV. Buenos Aires: Editorial Oriente.
- Scheina, Robert L. (2003). Latin America's Wars: the age of the caudillo, 1791–1899. Vol. 1 (1 ed.). Washington, D.C.: Brassey's, Inc. ISBN 1-57488-450-6.
- Vale, Brian (2000). A War Betwixt Englishmen: Brazil Against Argentina on the River Plate. 1825-1830. London: I. B. Tauris. ISBN 1-86064-456-2
