= Mar del Plata Sud railway station =

Former railway station in Mar del Plata, Argentina

Mar del Plata Sud
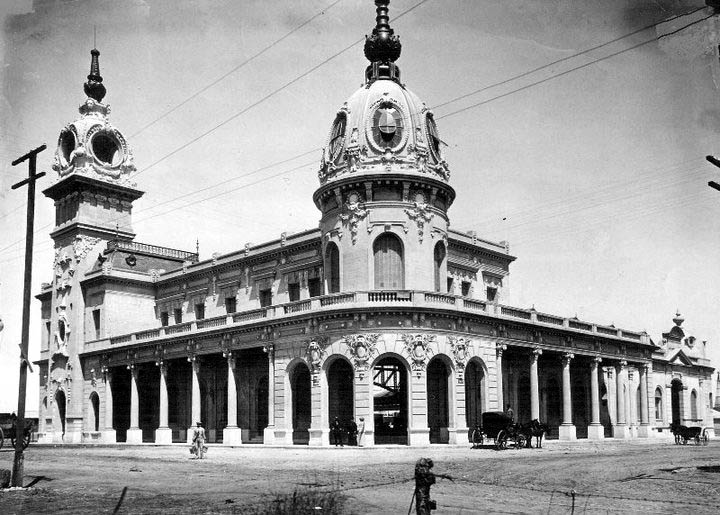
- The station C. 1910

General information
- Location: Alberti 1600, Mar del Plata; Argentina
- System: Regional
- Owner: Government of Argentina
- Operator: BAGSR
- Line: Roca
- Distance: 400 km (250 mi) from Buenos Aires

History
- Opened: 1910
- Closed: May 1949; 77 years ago
- Rebuilt: 2015
Location

Mar del Plata Sud is a former railway station in the city of Mar del Plata in Buenos Aires Province, Argentina. Built and managed by the Buenos Aires Great Southern Railway, the station was conceived as an alternative to the original Mar del Plata station built in 1886, only to operate during Summer seasons. The station was inaugurated in 1910. Soon after the Government led by Juan Perón nationalised the entire railway network, the station was closed to reduce costs.

After being a bus terminal from 1950 to 2009, and remaining closed during 6 years, the building was refurbished and re-opened in 2015 as a cultural center.

== History ==
=== Background ===
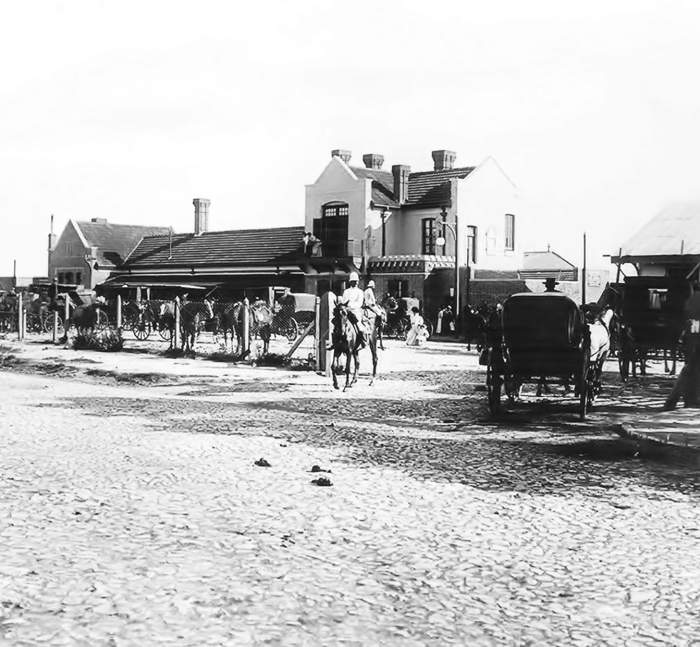
The first Mar del Plata station, opened in 1886

In August 1861, Edward Lumb, a British entrepreneur, requested the concession of a railway line, initially projected to run from Constitución to Chascomús, 120 km from Buenos Aires.

During a visit to Mar del Plata, Governor of Buenos Aires, Dardo Rocha, saw the potential of the city, assuring a promising future for it. Before leaving the city, he promised to call manager of Buenos Aires Great Southern Railway (the British company that had built the lines in the south of the province), Guillermo Moores, to request the extension of the railway line from Maipú to Mar del Plata. Moreover, Rocha stated that in case the BAGSR declined the request, the Provincial Government would finance the construction of the line to the coast city.

On September 26, 1886, the first train arrived to the city of Mar del Plata, which was the main tourist destination during summer season.

=== Opening of the Sud station ===
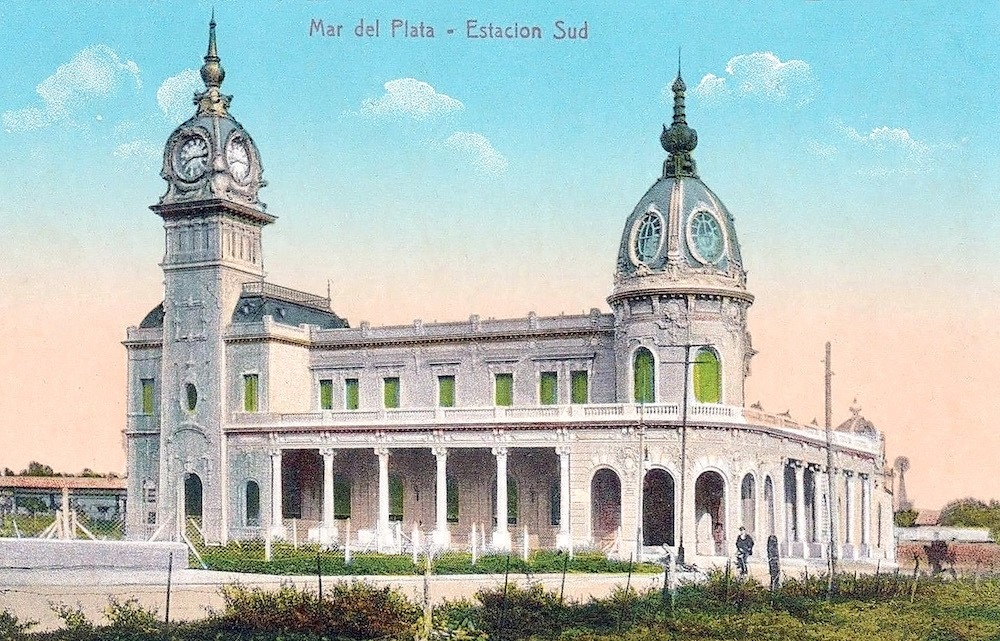
Color postcard of the station.

By 1910 Mar del Plata was the main beach city of Argentina, receiving a huge number of tourists during the summer. Due to the intense traffic of passengers, the railway station exceeded its capacity and the Municipality demanded the company to increase the facilities. The company had always denied to this request alleging that the station was only overcrowded during two months per year (the period of summer season in Argentina).

During the first decade of the 20th century, the urban development of Mar del Plata moved from the downtown to the South West (nearest to the coast) so the train station was far from the residences and hotels where the tourist were hosted. In June 1908, the Congress promulgated Law 5.535, authorizing the BAGSR to build a new station in Mar del Plata.

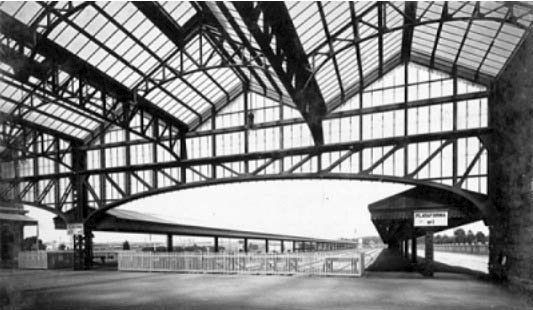
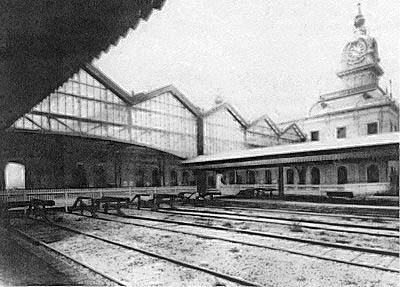
Interior and exterior view of the Mar del Plata Sud platforms, c. 1910

Although the construction of a new station had been approved, a residents' committee (led by Mar del Plata pioneer Pedro Luro) opposed the old station being demolished, requesting its preservation. Percy Clarke, manager of the company had to accept the residents' claim. The other point of conflict with the inhabitants of the city was the path of the new line. While the company wanted to build the new station near to the coast (to reduce costs), the residents demanded that the station should be located far from the most populated areas of the city. Eventually, the BAGSR agreed to build the new station where the neighbours had demanded.

With a project designed by Belgian Architect Jules Dormal, works began in 1909 and finished one year later, when the station building began to be constructed. The project of the company also included to extend the tracks to the city of Miramar. The new station in Mar del Plata (named "Mar del Plata Sud") was opened on December 1, 1910, although the main building was not still finished, so a provisional wooden-structure was opened to the public for the 1910–11 summer season.

As Mar del Plata Norte remained active, the Sud station would be only used during the summer seasons. It had two large platforms, the main building, a post warehouse, and a signal cabin. When the new station opened, all the trains that arrived to the old station were reprogrammed to make their arrival to the South station. It totalled four services per day, including the two express services. Nevertheless, a few days before the inauguration, the BAGSR requested to the Government that only the express services arrived to the new station, due to the other three trains programmed having to end their routes in Miramar and could not change their path to the south station. The request was approved and therefore only the express services stopped at the new station.

When the entire Argentine railway network was nationalised in 1948, Mar del Plata became part of General Roca Railway, one of the six divisions of state-owned Ferrocarriles Argentinos.

On May 3, 1949, the Mar del Plata Sud station was definitively closed so Mar del Plata Norte became the only station in the city.

=== Post-closure ===
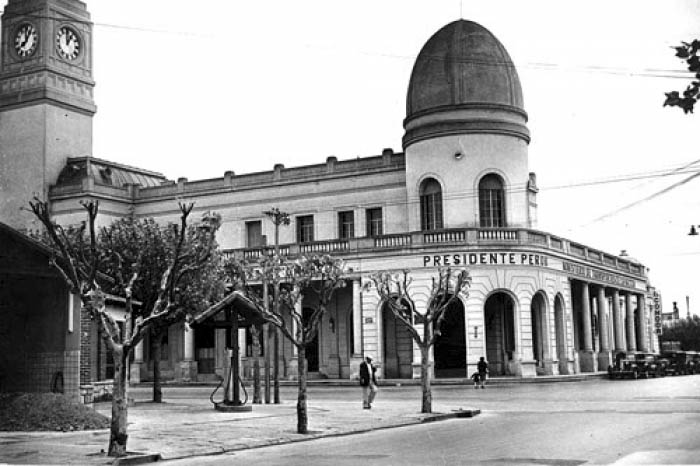
Mar del Plata Sud as a bus terminal in the 1950s. Most of its ornaments designed by Dormal had disappeared, which is clearly visible on the dome and arcs

When the station was closed in 1949, the Municipality of Mar del Plata decided to preserve the original building, adapting the former station to establish a bus terminal so the city did not have one. Therefore, the rail tracks were lifted.

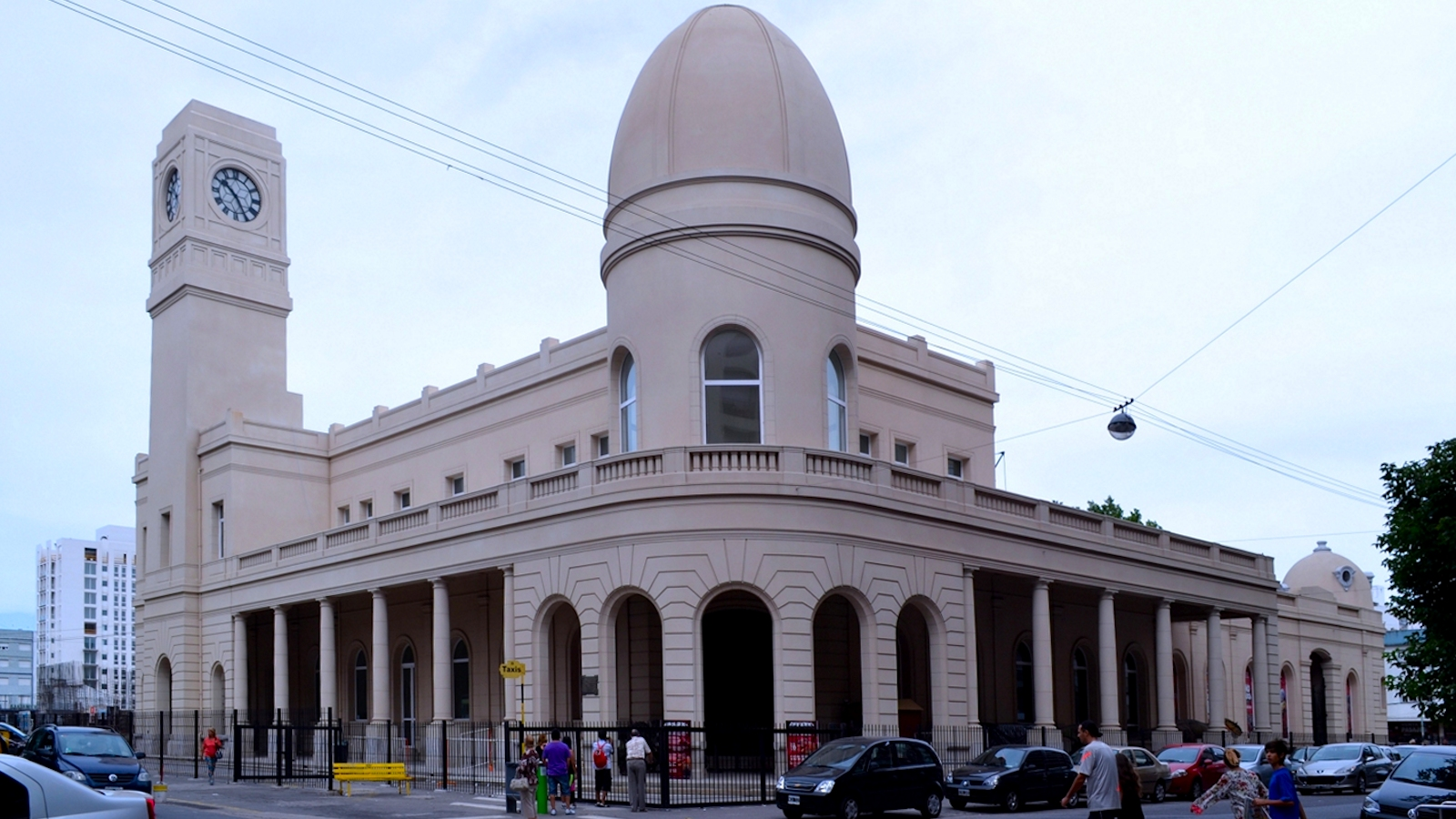
The building in 2014. It was closed from 2009 to 2015, when it was re-inaugurated as a cultural center

The bus terminal was inaugurated in 1950, named "Presidente Perón" but it was then removed when Revolucion Libertadora took the power in 1955.

The terminal operated until December 2009, when the Government of Argentina moved all the bus traffic to new MAr del Plata bus station on San Juan Avenue. Two years later, the station became a railway and bus terminal after tracks from the old "Norte" station (distant a few meters from there) were extended to connect both stations, adding new platforms to receive trains arriving from Constitución in Buenos Aires.

After several years of being useless, in November 2015, the station building became "Centro Cultural Terminal Sur", a cultural center. Next to the historic building, it was built a complex that included a shopping center, parking lots, cinemas, and restaurants. The entire complex is currently administrated by a Spanish consortium owned by millionaire investor Aldrey Iglesias after it granted concession to refurbish the former station building.

== See also ==
- Mar del Plata railway station (original 1886 station)
- Mar del Plata railway and bus station (terminal opened in 2009)

== Bibliography ==
- López, Mario (1991). Historia de los Ferrocarriles de la Provincia de Buenos Aires: 1857-1886. Buenos Aires: Ediciones Lumiere.
