= Mar del Plata railway station =

Former railway station in Mar del Plata, Argentina

Mar del Plata Norte
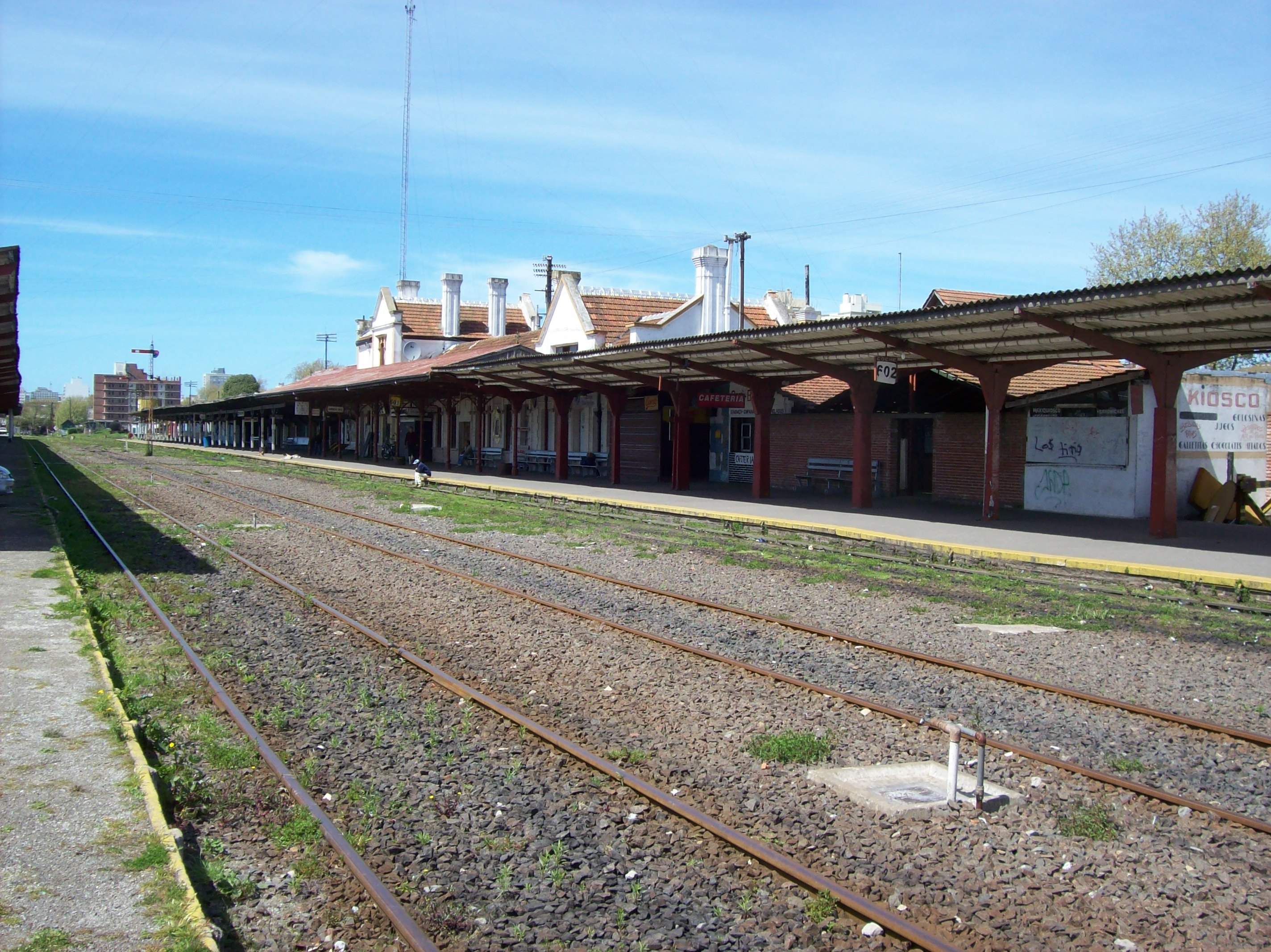
- Station platforms in 2008

General information
- Location: Av. Pedro Luro 4400, Mar del Plata; Argentina
- Coordinates: 37.9880°S 57.5661°W
- System: Regional
- Owner: Government of Argentina
- Operator: Ferrobaires (1993–2011)
- Line: Roca
- Distance: 400 km (250 mi) from Buenos Aires

History
- Opened: 1886
- Closed: 2011; 15 years ago
Location

Mar del Plata (also known as Mar del Plata Norte) is a former train station in the homonymous city of Buenos Aires Province, Argentina. Opened in 1886, the station was closed when the new railway and bus terminal was opened in 2011.

== History ==
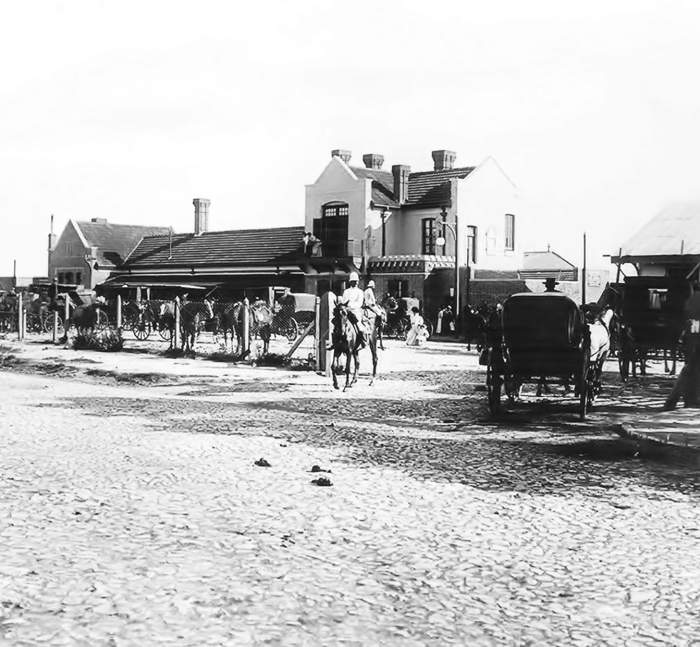
The station was opened in 1886

In August 1861, Edward Lumb, a British entrepreneur, requested the concession of a railway line, initially projected to run from Constitución to Chascomús, 120 km from Buenos Aires.

During a visit to Mar del Plata, Governor of Buenos Aires, Dardo Rocha, saw the potential of the city, assuring a promising future for it. Before leaving the city, he promised to call manager of Buenos Aires Great Southern Railway (the British company that had built the lines in the south of the province), Guillermo Moores, to request the extension of the railway line from Maipú to Mar del Plata. Moreover, Rocha stated that in case the BAGSR declined the request, the Provincial Government would finance the construction of the line to the coast city.

On September 26, 1886, the first train arrived to the city of Mar del Plata, which was the main tourist destination during summer season.

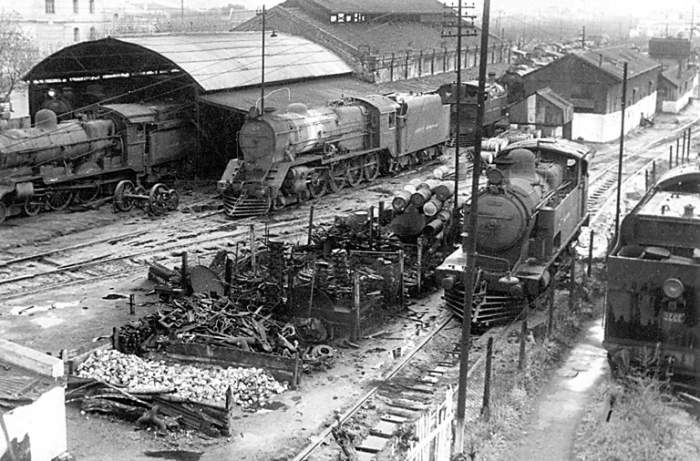
Freight trains operating in Mar del Plata station in 1910

By 1910 Mar del Plata was the main beach city of Argentina, receiving a huge number of tourists during the summer. Due to the intense traffic of passengers, the railway station exceeded its capacity and the Municipality demanded the company to increase the facilities. The company had always denied to this request alleging that the station was only overcrowded during two months per year (the period of summer season in Argentina).

During the first decade of the 20th century, the urban development of Mar del Plata moved from the downtown to the South West (nearest to the coast) so the train station was far from the residences and hotels where the tourist were hosted. In June 1908, the Congress promulgated Law 5.535, authorizing the BAGSR to build a new station in Mar del Plata.

With a project designed by Belgian Architect Jules Dormal, works began in 1909 and finished one year later, when the station building began to be constructed. The project of the company also included to extend the tracks to the city of Miramar. The new station in Mar del Plata (named "Mar del Plata Sud") was opened on December 1, 1910, although the main building was not still finished, so a provisional wooden-structure was opened to the public for the 1910–11 summer season.

As Mar del Plata Norte remained active, the Sud station would be only used during the summer seasons. It had two large platforms, the main building, a post warehouse, and a signal cabin. When the new station opened, all the trains that arrived to the old station were reprogrammed to make their arrival to the South station.

When the entire Argentine railway network was nationalised in 1948, Mar del Plata became part of General Roca Railway, one of the six divisions of state-owned Ferrocarriles Argentinos.

On May 3, 1949, the Mar del Plata Sud station was definitively closed so Mar del Plata Norte became the only station in the city. In 1951 Ferrocarriles Argentinos acquired a total of 12 coaches from American Budd Company, used for The Marplatense, a luxury service from Buenos Aires to Mar del Plata. In 1952 the FADEL locomotives were added to tow the Marplatense express with a journey time of 3 hours and 45 minutes.

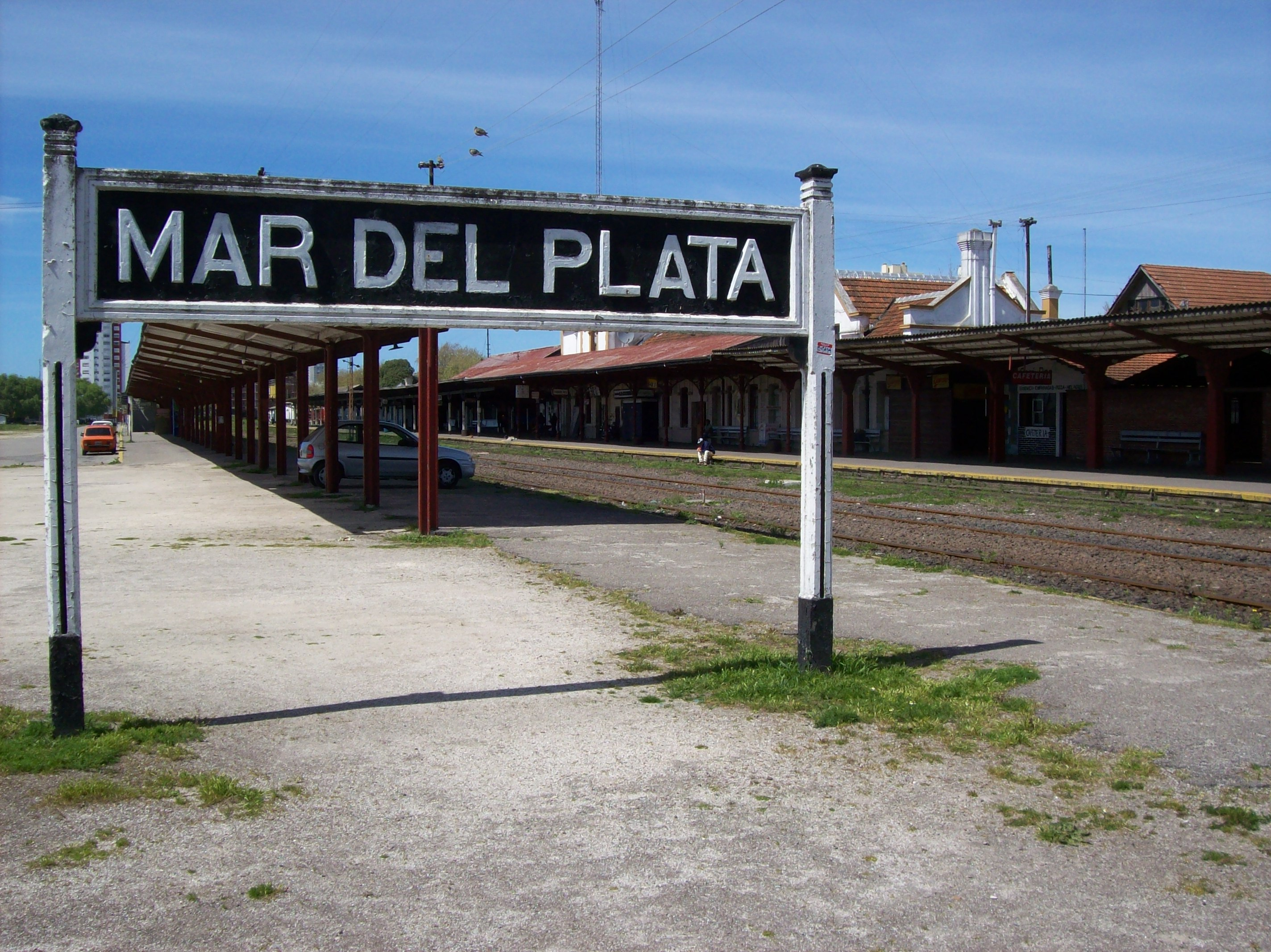
Platforms and sign pictured in 2008

FA ran trains until 1993 when the service was taken over by Ferrobaires, a company owned by the Buenos Aires Province. Ferrobaires operated the standard services between Mar del Plata and Buenos Aires until its closure in 2018.

In 2009, the bus terminus (that had operated in the former Mar del Plata Sud station building, on Alberti street) moved to a new building, very close to the still active Mar del Plata Norte railway station in the centre of the city. It was also announced that the old building would be preserved as a cultural centre, designed by Arq. César Pelli.

Two years later, the rail tracks were extended to connect with the bus station, adding new platforms to receive trains arriving from Constitución in Buenos Aires, therefore the old station entered into disuse.

== Historic operators ==
Company	Period
(United Kingdom) Buenos Aires Great Southern Railway	1886–1948
(Argentina) Ferrocarriles Argentinos	1948–1993
(Argentina) Ferrobaires	1993–2011

== See also ==
- Mar del Plata railway and bus station
- Mar del Plata Sud railway station

== Bibliography ==
- López, Mario (1991). Historia de los Ferrocarriles de la Provincia de Buenos Aires: 1857-1886. Buenos Aires: Ediciones Lumiere.
