= Ferrobaires =

Argentinean public railway company (1993–2018)

Unidad Ejecutora del Programa Ferroviario Provincial (UEPFP)
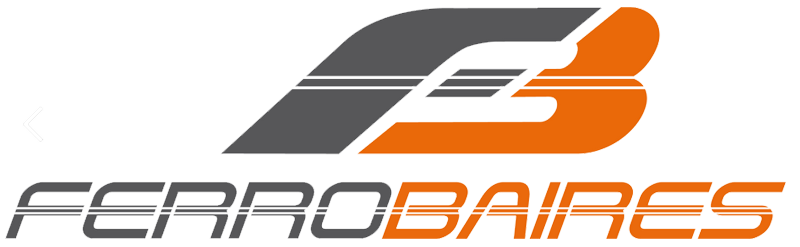

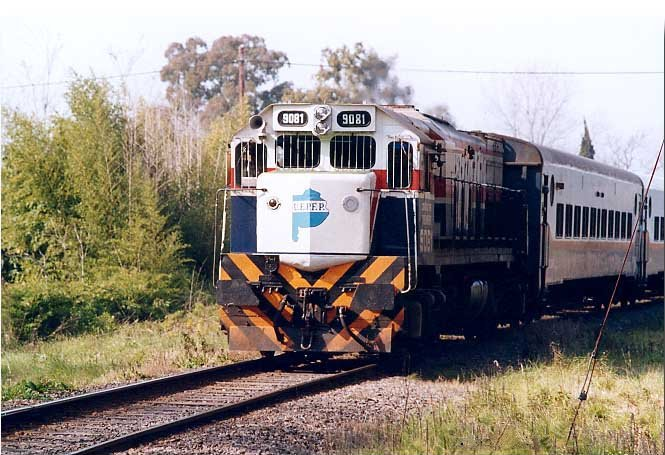
- A Ferrobaires train to Junín in 2000
- Trade name: Ferrobaires
- Company type: Public
- Industry: Railway
- Predecessor: Ferrocarriles Argentinos
- Founded: 15 January 1993 in La Plata, Argentina
- Founder: Government of Buenos Aires Province
- Defunct: 15 March 2018
- Fate: Defunct
- Successor: Trenes Argentinos
- Headquarters: La Plata, Argentina
- Area served: Buenos Aires Province
- Key people: Héctor Dotti (General Administrator)
- Services: Rail transport
- Net income: ▼$A 60 million (2016)
- Owner: Buenos Aires Province

The Unidad Ejecutora del Plan Ferroviario Provincial (UEPFP) (in English: "Executive Unit of the Provincial Railway Plan"), mostly known under its trade name Ferrobaires, was a public railway company which operated extensive long-distance passenger trains throughout the Buenos Aires Province in Argentina. The company was primarily owned and funded by the Buenos Aires provincial government led by Eduardo Duhalde. The name "Ferrobaires" is a combination of the Spanish words for "Rail Buenos Aires."

From its base in the city of Buenos Aires, Ferrobaires rail lines extended south and west across the province. The company transported approximately 1.5 million passengers annually and operated from all three major rail termini in the city of Buenos Aires: Retiro (San Martín), Constitución, and Once, running trains on its 5,500 km of rail tracks.

== History ==
=== Background ===
All of the routes which were managed by Ferrobaires were previously operated by Ferrocarriles Argentinos, the country's former national passenger railway corporation. After the privatisation of Ferrocarriles Argentinos starting in 1989, many train services across Argentina were indefinitely discontinued. In 1992 the Governor of Buenos Aires Province, Eduardo Duhalde, signed Decree 560/91 by which Buenos Aires requested National Government to transfer the operation of the lines deactivated between 1961 and 1992, that comprised more than 5,500 km of railway lines. Buenos Aires proposed to work with other municipal governments to create a company that operated the railway services.

On 28 April 1992, Buenos Aires officially requested the transfer of 52 disused lines and branches. In January 1993, "Unidad Ejecutora del Programa Ferroviario Provincial" (UEPFP) was created through decree n° 99/93. However, several lines were closed down by the UEPFP, especially during the 2001 financial crisis.

By National decrees 1168/1992 and 770/1993, the Government of Argentina transferred to the Government of Buenos Aires Province the operation of several lines in the Buenos Aires, La Pampa and Río Negro Provinces.

Lines that Ferrobaires were to operate included the Constitución to Mar del Plata line, the Bahía Blanca, Bariloche, Quequén and Bolívar line; the Olavarría to Bahía Blanca line; the Once to General Villegas, Toay, General Pico and Darragueira line; the Retiro (San Martín) to Alberdi and Junín line; and the Federico Lacroze to Rojas line.

=== Operation ===
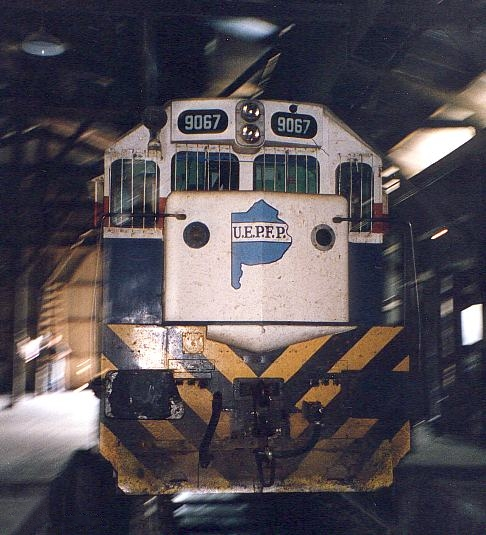
A diesel locomotive with the UEPFP logo in 1999

Ferrobaires reactivated some lines that had been abandoned for many years (such as the Mar del Plata–Miramar and Gral. Guido–Gral. Madariaga lines, which had been closed down in 1978) and even built and opened a new station ("Divisadero de Pinamar", replacing the original station) on the Gral. Guido–Vivoratá branch, in 1996. Trains ran again to Pinamar after 29 years of no service.

Nevertheless, those lines would be closed again due to lack of maintenance and lack of sufficient rolling stock. The branch to Pinamar was closed in April 2011 and remained closed.

In early 2006, the national Ministry of Planning considered taking control of the company to arrange for it to be privatised once more, but the provincial government of Felipe Solá refused to allow this to happen, arguing that under provincial state control the company was working very efficiently and with low fares.

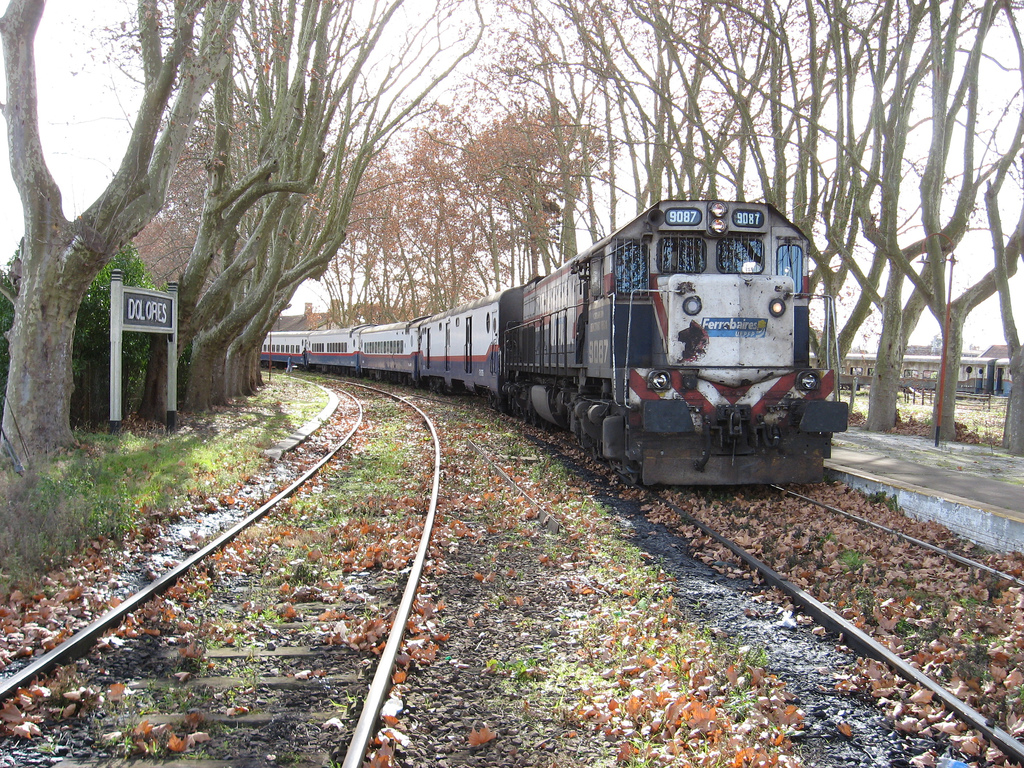
A Ferrobaires train stopped at Dolores, Buenos Aires in 2007

On 8 February 2007, the Provincial Government agreed to transfer all the services to the National Government to keep the lines active as many of the services on the lines were frequently interrupted due to technical problems. Nevertheless, this agreement was never carried through and Ferrobaires continued being operated by the province.

By 2011 Ferrobaires was widely criticised by users and journalists because of its severe operational problems trying to run the various railway services.

In July 2015, Ferrobaires announced the re-establishment of services from Plaza Constitución to Pinamar that had been suspended in 2010 with one service per week, and intermediate stops at Santo Domingo, Segurola, Monsalvo and Invernadas and Gral. Madariaga. The service started operations again on 17 July.

=== Decline ===
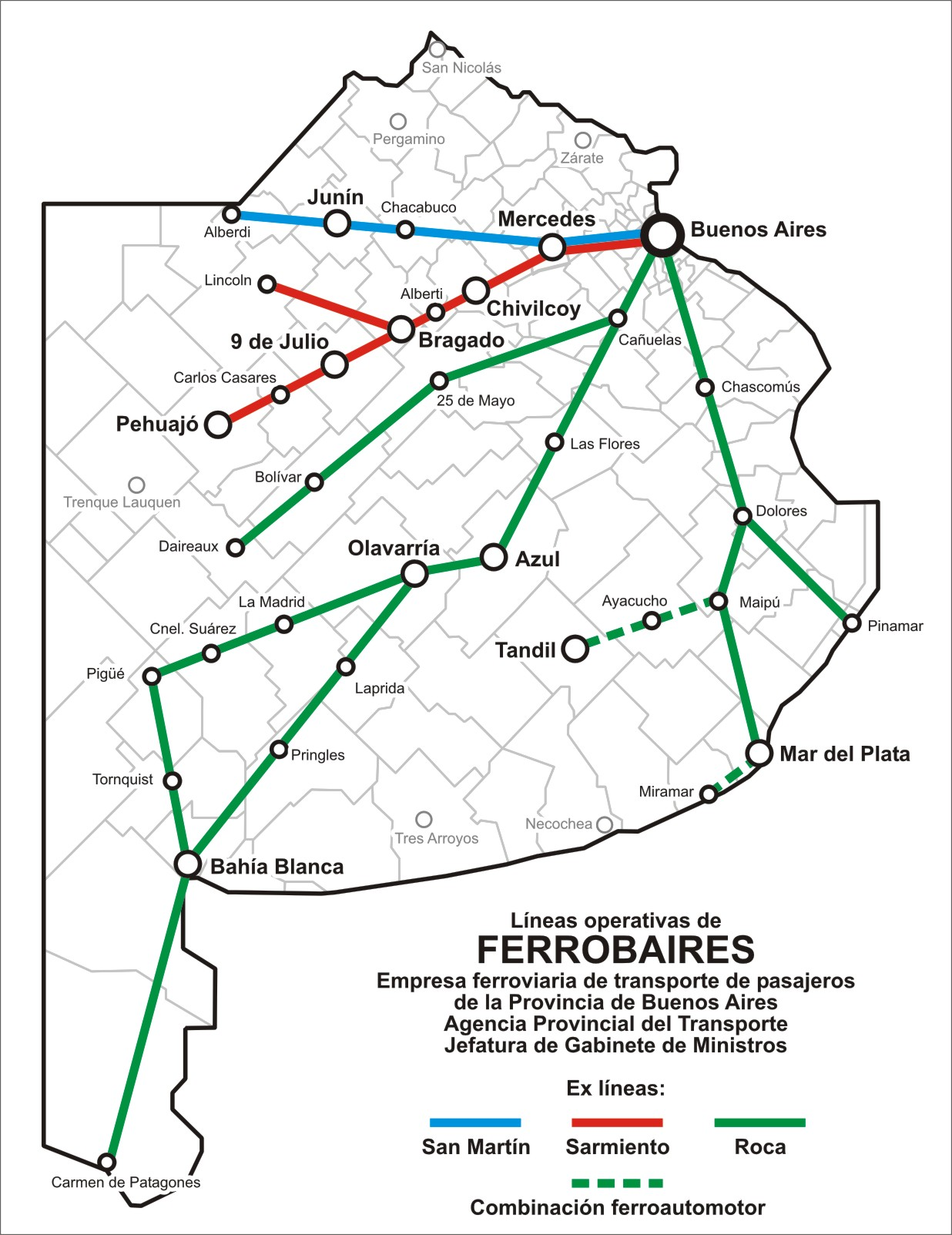
Ferrobaires routes as of 2011

In June 2016, after a Ferrobaires train collided with a Belgrano Cargas y Logística freight train in Rawson, a city in Chacabuco Partido, the Government of Buenos Aires Province led by María Eugenia Vidal ordered the suspension of all services (eight in total) operated by Ferrobaires. That decision was taken alleging "the need of preserving security of passengers and service operators".

Nevertheless, it was announced that the service from Constitución to Mar del Plata would remain active as it would be transferred to the National Government. Likewise, a report by "Auditoría General de la Nación" (General Auditing Office of Argentina) revealed that rolling stock, rail tracks and signal systems had severely deteriorated due to the lack of maintenance. As of June 2016, the operation of services by Ferrobaires was costing $1,200 million per year, with annual income of only $60 million.

In July 2016, it was announced that Ferrobaires would be shut down and all of its personnel and infrastructure transferred to the National Government, a process that had been unsuccessfully attempted in 2007. Passenger services formerly operated by the provincial administration (since 1993) would be run by the Operadora Ferroviaria Sociedad del Estado (SOFSE). In January 2018, Governor Vidal signed the decree to transfer Ferrobaires services and assets to the National State.

Services taken over by SOFSE included the following lines: Plaza Constitución to Bahía Blanca, Bariloche, Quequén and Bolívar; Olavarría to Bahía Blanca; Once to Toay, General Pico, General Villegas, Darregueira and Lincoln; Lincoln to Villegas and Pasteur; Retiro to Alberti and Junín; Federico Lacroze to Rojas. All those services were part of the original set of railway services transferred to the Buenos Aires province in 1992. The Mar del Plata – Miramar and General Guido – General Madariaga lines (not included in the original Decree N° 1168/92) had been re-established by the Provincial Government after the transfer of the services.

== Services ==
At the time of its closure Ferrobaires operated the following services:

Start	End	Dist./Km	Days of service	Rail line
Constitución	Mar del Plata	400	Mon-Sun	Roca
Constitución	Tandil	330	Tue, Fri	Roca
Constitución	Bahía Blanca (via Lamadrid)	680	Mon, Wed, Fri	Roca
Constitución	Bahía Blanca (via Pringles)	640	Tue, Thu	Roca
Constitución	25 de Mayo	205	Tue, Fri	Roca
Tandil	Vela	48	Wed, Sun	Roca
Retiro (San Martín)	Alberdi	336	Fri	San Martín
Once	Bragado	209	Mon-Sat	Sarmiento
