= Fábrica Argentina de Locomotoras =

Argentinian rail vehicle manufacturer

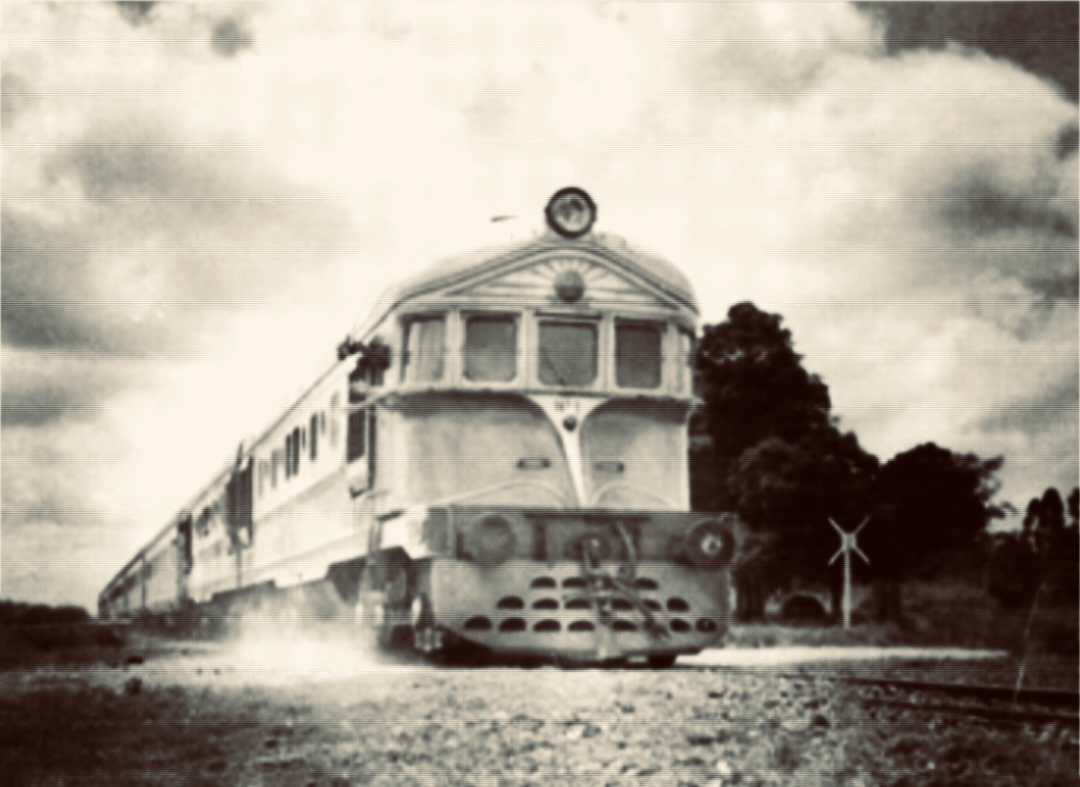
- A Justicialista diesel locomotive at a level crossing, 1952.
- Company type: State-owned company
- Industry: Transport
- Founded: 1 May 1952
- Defunct: September 16, 1955; 70 years ago
- Key people: Pedro Sacaggio
- Products: Locomotives, Diesel multiple units
- Number of employees: 100+

Fábrica Argentina de Locomotoras (mostly known for its acronym FAdeL) was an Argentine manufacturer of rail vehicles which came about as a result of President Juan Perón's first five-year plan, which sought to expand national industries to reduce imports from foreign countries. It is best known for producing the Justicialista diesel-electric locomotive.

== History ==
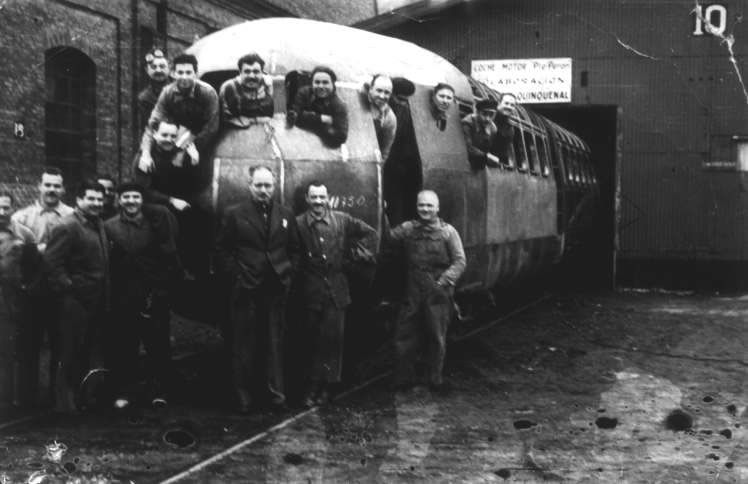
Workers with the "Presidente Perón" diesel multiple unit outside the FAdeL workshop in Liniers (1954)

The first diesel locomotive had been designed by Argentine engineer Pedro Sacaggio in 1933. The company began with buying engines from Fiat Ferroviaria and Cantieri Riuniti dell'Adriatico in Italy and aimed to manufacture around 600 locomotives. FAdeL's first and most renowned vehicle was a diesel locomotive featured in 1951 by then-president Juan Perón and Saccaggio and nicknamed Justicialista. The first model launched was catalogued as "CM1". On May 1, 1952, FAdeL was officially established by Resolution n° 79 from the Ministry of Transport. The company's first factory in Liniers employed over one hundred people and was located in the workshops of the Sarmiento Railway.

The Justicialista (also the first diesel locomotive produced in Argentina) made its debut on the General Roca Railway, serving on the Constitución–Mar del Plata line towing the Marplatense express during summer holidays of 1952. The journey took 3 hours and 45 minutes. This machine would also run to Bariloche (with a journey time of 22 hours 10 minutes) and Mendoza (11 hours 40 minutes) at an average speed of 145 km/h and remained active until the mid 1960s.

Although a second model, the CM2, named Argentina was launched by FAdeL as a successor of the CM1, the Revolución Libertadora which ousted Perón in September 1955 halted any further production. The company then ramped up production under the leadership of the Sacaggio and moved to the General San Martín Railway workshops in Mendoza Province.

After the coup, the plan to build the locomotives was forgotten and the factory closed. The original plans, preliminary studies and equipment for the locomotives was either lost or destroyed while the contents of the factory was sold for scrap. However, the engines bought for the locomotives were used for Materfer's GAIA locomotives in the 1960s.
