= Bahía Blanca Sud railway station =

Railway station in Buenos Aires

Coordinates: 38°43′17.2″S 62°15′17.1″W

Bahía Blanca Sud
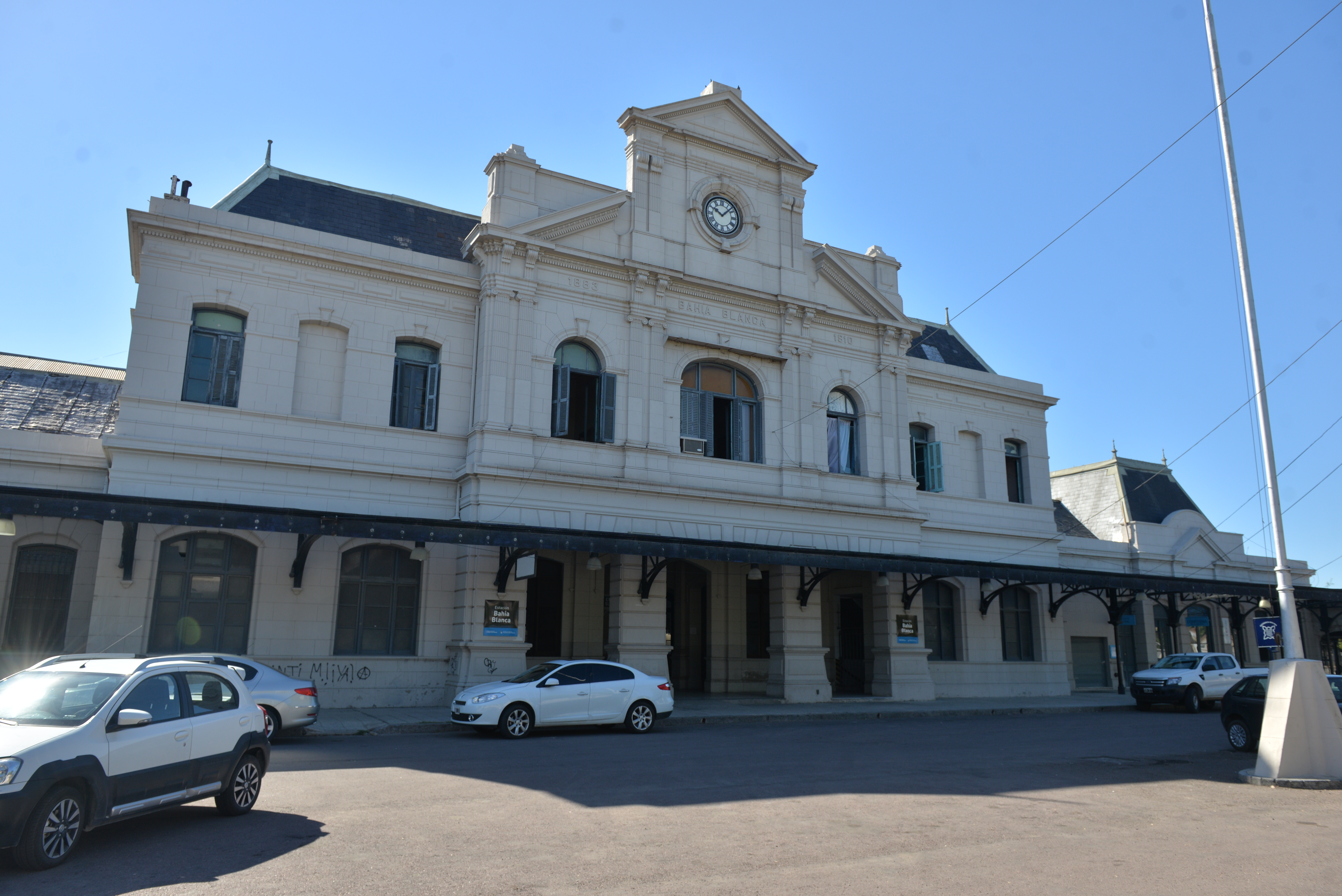
- The station in 2018

General information
- Location: Av. General Cerri 750, Bahía Blanca; Argentina
- System: Inter-city rail
- Owner: Government of Argentina
- Operator: List: BA Great Southern (1884–1948); Ferrocarriles Argentinos (1948–1993); Ferrobaires (1993–2016); Trenes Argentinos Operaciones (2017–2022)
- Line: Roca
- Distance: 637 km (396 mi)
- Platforms: 6

History
- Opened: 26 April 1884; 142 years ago
- Rebuilt: 19 December 1911; 114 years ago
Location

Bahía Blanca Sud (English: Bahía Blanca South) is an inactive railway station of the Argentine rail network, part of the General Roca Railway. Originally built and operated by the Buenos Aires Great Southern Railway, it is located in the city of Bahía Blanca, Buenos Aires Province. In November 2014 the station was declared a National Historical Monument by the Argentine government.

Bahía Blanca Sud station was the seat of the Sport Museum ("Museo del Deporte") of the city, until 2015, when it was moved to "Torre del Bicentenario".

== History ==
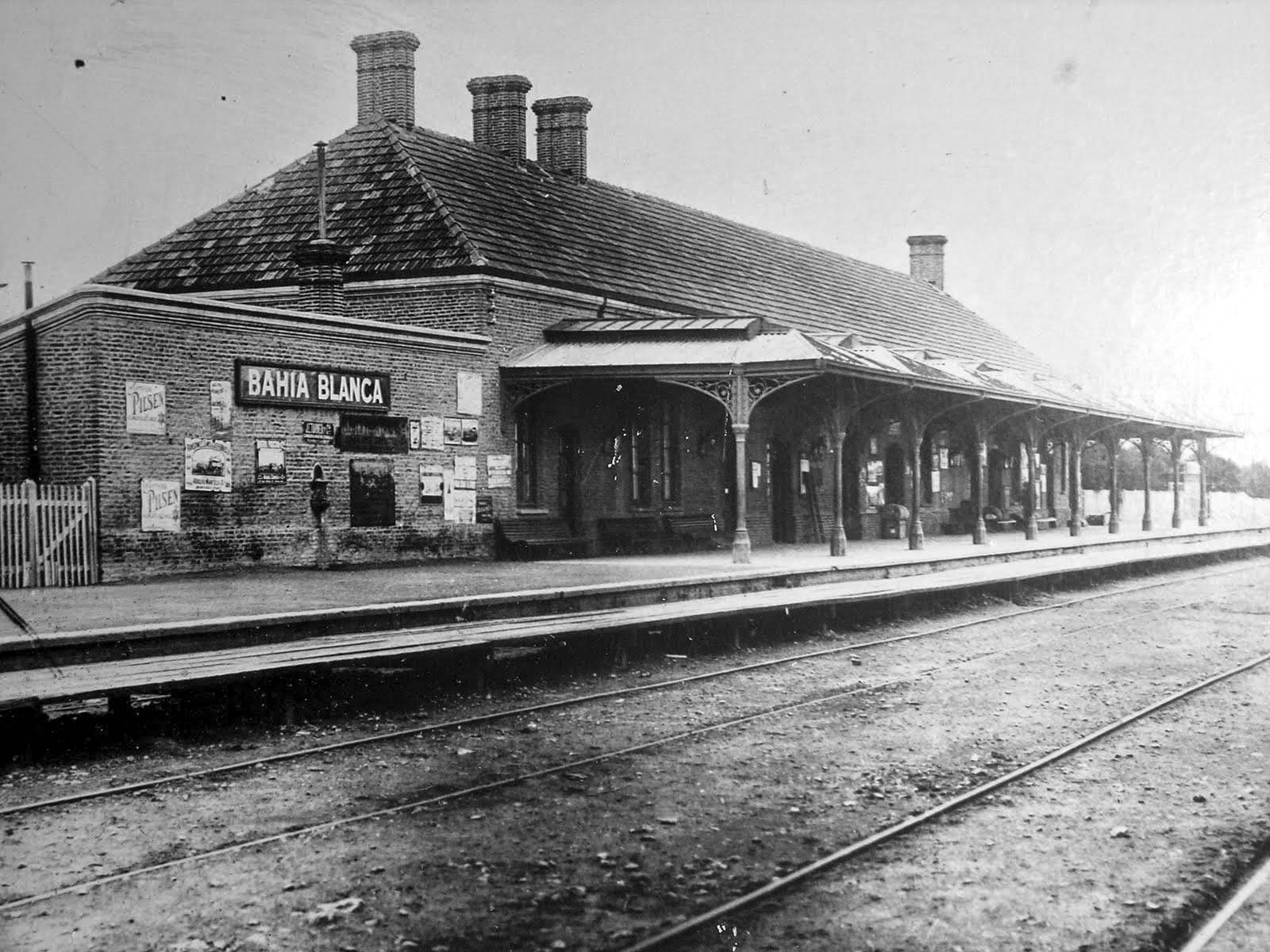
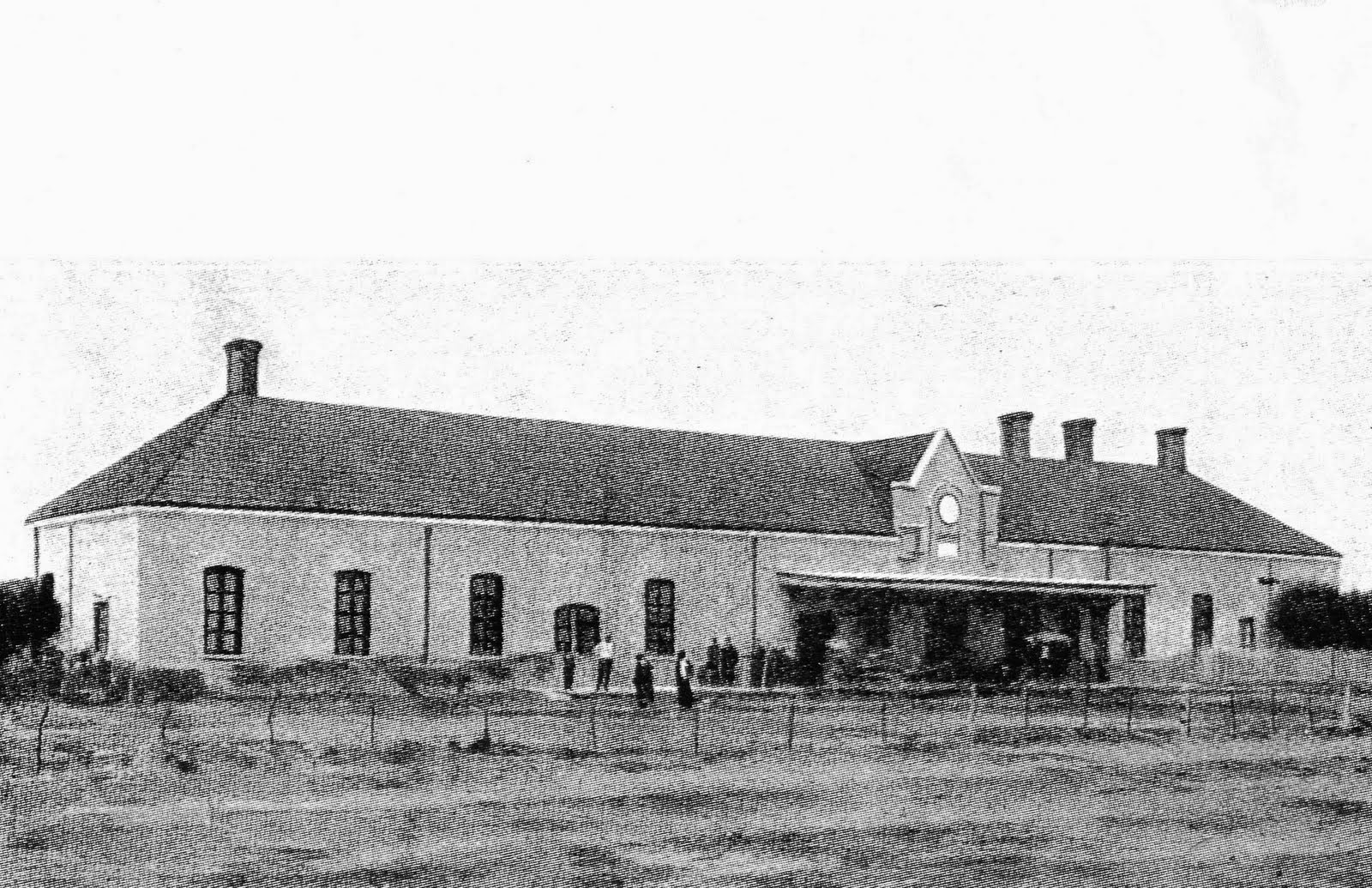
Two images of the original station building in 1906 and 1910

Bahía Blanca Sud was built by the British-owned Buenos Aires Great Southern Railway company and inaugurated on 26 April 1884. The station was named "Bahía Blanca Sud" to differentiate it from the other railway stations in the town, Bahía Blanca Noroeste, built by the British-owned Bahía Blanca and North Western Railway and Bahía Blanca of the French-owned Rosario and Puerto Belgrano Railway.

Bahía Blanca was one of the few BAGSR stations that included a coffeehouse (opened with the station in 1884), along with Ayacucho, Azul, Empalme Lobos, Ingeniero White, Las Flores, La Plata, Mar del Plata, Plaza Constitución, Tandil and Tres Arroyos.

In July 1903, the BAGSR announced the construction of a new building, which began in 1909. The remodeling included the enlargement of the installations and the construction of a new main building. The new station was inaugurated on 19 December 1911.

When the entire Argentine railway network was nationalised in 1948, the station became part of General Roca Railway, one of the six divisions of state-owned company Ferrocarriles Argentinos. After its privatisation under Carlos Menem's administration, which resulted in the effective cessation of all long distance passenger services in Argentina, in 1993 the national Government transferred the operation of several lines in Buenos Aires to the provincial government, including the Roca line from Constitución to Bahía Blanca.

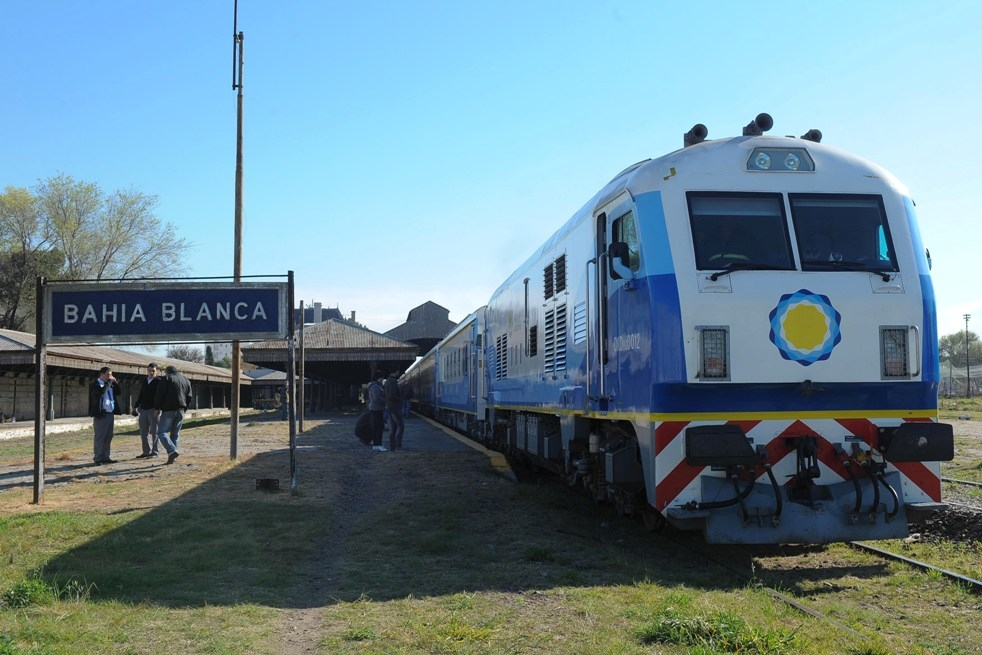
Train at the station in 2015

In 2009 the Municipality began works to remodel the station facilities, including its coffeehouse, that were finished one year later. The restoration was executed by the Ministry of Infrastructure of the Province of Buenos Aires and funded by the Ministry of Federal Planning, Public Investment and Services. Between 2011 and 2012 the station clock, dating to 1880, was also restored.

In November 2014, by Decree 2181/2014, the station was declared a National Historical Monument.

State-owned Trenes Argentinos Operaciones (which took over the service after the demise of Ferrobaires in 2016) ran services between Constitución and Bahía Blanca Sud twice a week. After a derailment in Olavarría in 2022, services to Bahía Blanca were interrupted by TA in October. Since then, the station has remained inactive.

== Historic operators ==
Operator	Period
(United Kingdom) Buenos Aires Great Southern Railway	1884–1948
(Argentina) Ferrocarriles Argentinos	1948–1993
(Argentina) Ferrobaires	1993–2016
(Argentina) Trenes Argentinos Operaciones	2017–2022
