= CNR CKD8 =

China CNR Corporation diesel-electric locomotive

CNR CKD8 locomotive
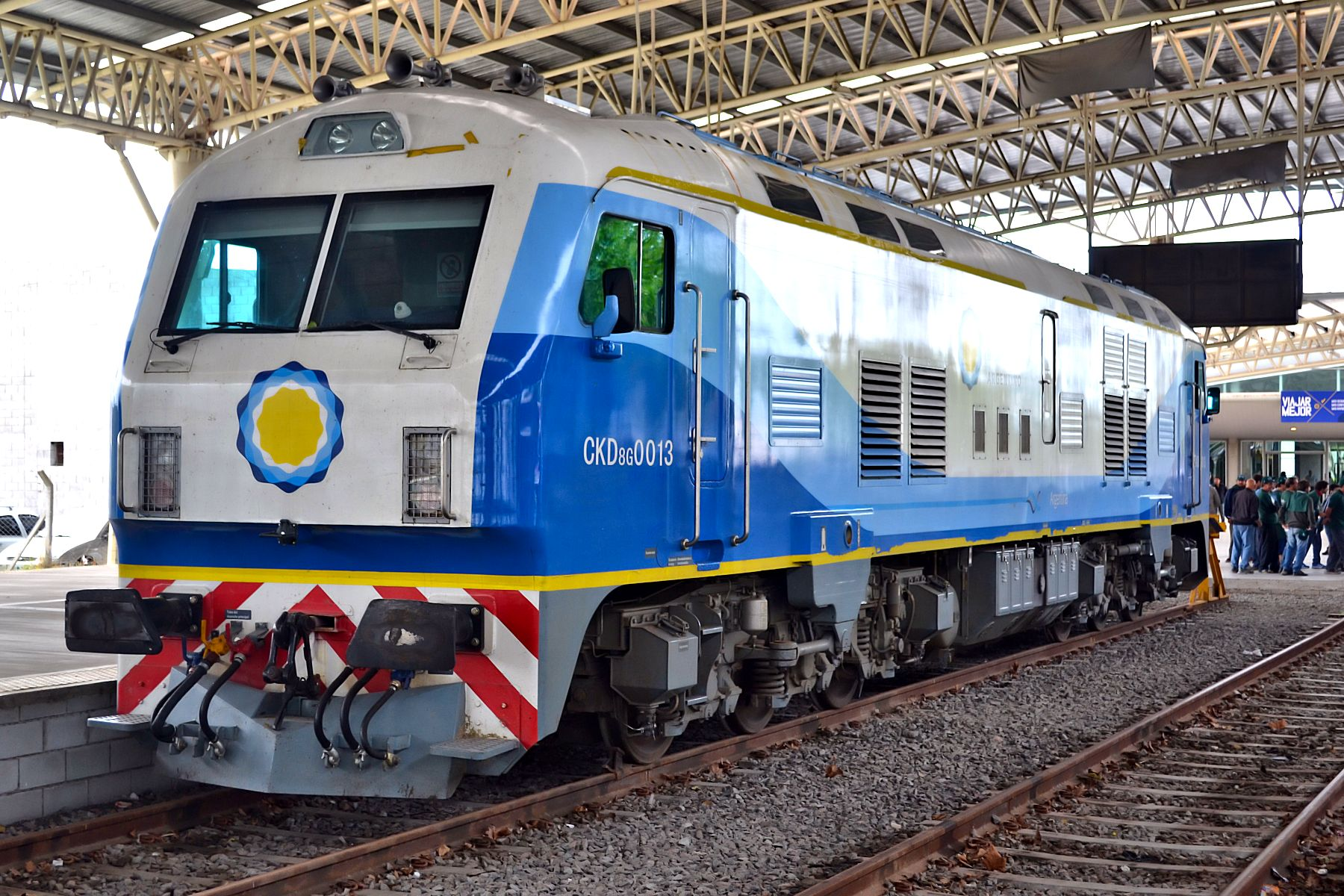
- A Trenes Argentinos CNR CKD8G at Mar del Plata station
Type and origin
- Power type: Diesel-electric
- Builder: China CNR Dalian Loco,
- Build date: 2013-
Specifications
- Gauge: 5 ft 6 in (1,676 mm)
- Prime mover: MTU 4000R43
- Engine type: V16 Diesel
- Cylinders: 16
Performance figures
- Maximum speed: CKD8G: 120 km/h (75 mph); CKD8H: 160 km/h (99 mph)
- Power output: 2,949 hp (2.2 MW)

The CNR CKD8 is a 2,949 hp (2.2 MW) diesel-electric locomotive manufactured by China CNR Corporation from 2013 onwards for use in Argentina by state-owned Trenes Argentinos, a subsidiary of Ferrocarriles Argentinos S.E. The CKD8G variant is used primarily on the Roca and Sarmiento railways, while the faster CKD8H is used on the San Martín and Mitre railways.

== Technical specifications ==
The locomotive has one conductor's cabin on each end, connected by an internal corridor. Its total weight is 120 tonnes with a maximum weight per axle of 20 tonnes. The four stroke 16V 4000R43 engine is manufactured by MTU Friedrichshafen and generates 2200 kW at 1800 RPM.

The locomotives are divided into two sub-models, the CKD8G and the CKD8H with the latter having a higher maximum speed and tractive force. Both have six axles with independent traction engines on each one and have both air and dynamic braking systems.

== Purchase and usage ==
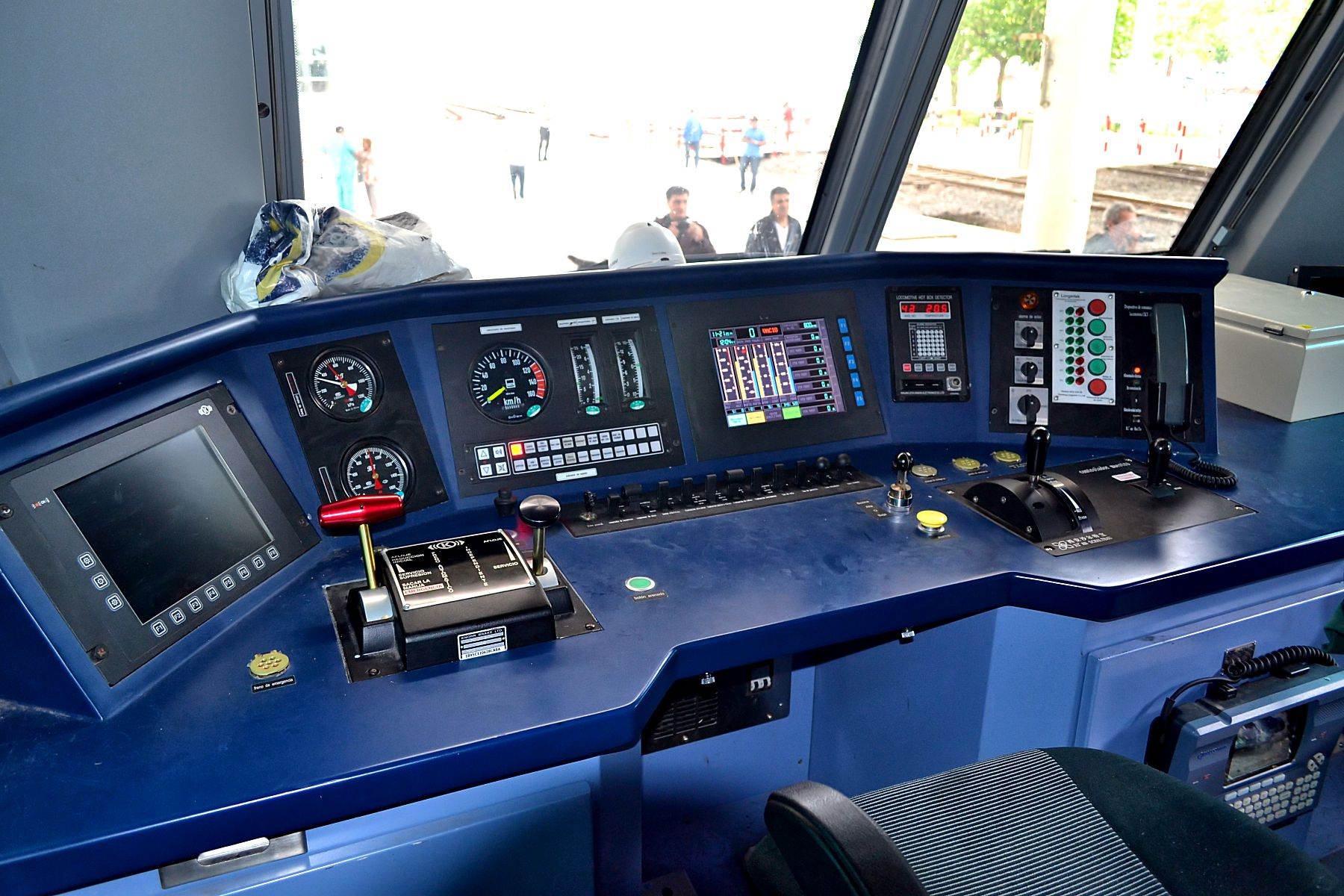
Interior of a cabin

The purchase agreement between the Ministry of Transport of Argentina and China CNR Corporation for 20 locomotives was signed in December 2009. The agreement also included the purchase of 220 long distance passenger carriages, while the total cost of each locomotive which arrived in Buenos Aires from China is estimated to be just under US$2 million.

The locomotives are operated by Trenes Argentinos and used on the Mitre, Roca, Sarmiento, and San Martín railways. Services departing from Retiro railway station run to the cities of Cordoba, San Miguel de Tucumán, Rufino, and Rosario, while those departing from Constitución go to points such as Mar del Plata.

In November 2014 the Nigerian Government signed a contract with CRRC for refurbishment on the Abuja-Kaduna railway. The locomotives were delivered on the 15 January 2018.

== See also ==
- CSR SDD7 - another Chinese locomotive found in Argentina
- CITIC-CNR - underground cars made by the same company for use in Argentina
- Trenes Argentinos - operator
- Ferrocarriles Argentinos (2015) - operator umbrella company
