= Pedro Sacaggio =

Argentine engineer and inventor

Pedro Sacaggio (1876–1959) was an Argentine engineer and inventor.

== Biographical information ==
Pedro Sacaggio moved to Argentina at the age of 6. At age 12 he began working in the workshops of the Central Argentine Railway. He started studying Mechanical Engineering at an early age. In 1936 he formally retired but continued to do various contracting work.

== Inventions ==
- In 1910 proposed a system of electric lighting and heating which replaced the traditional steam locomotive.
- He devised the mechanism that allowed the substitution of imported coal for domestic liquid fuel.
- In 1933 he designed the first diesel locomotive (CM-210) and it served until 1960.
