= Mar del Plata railway and bus station =

Transit station in Buenos Aires

Mar del Plata
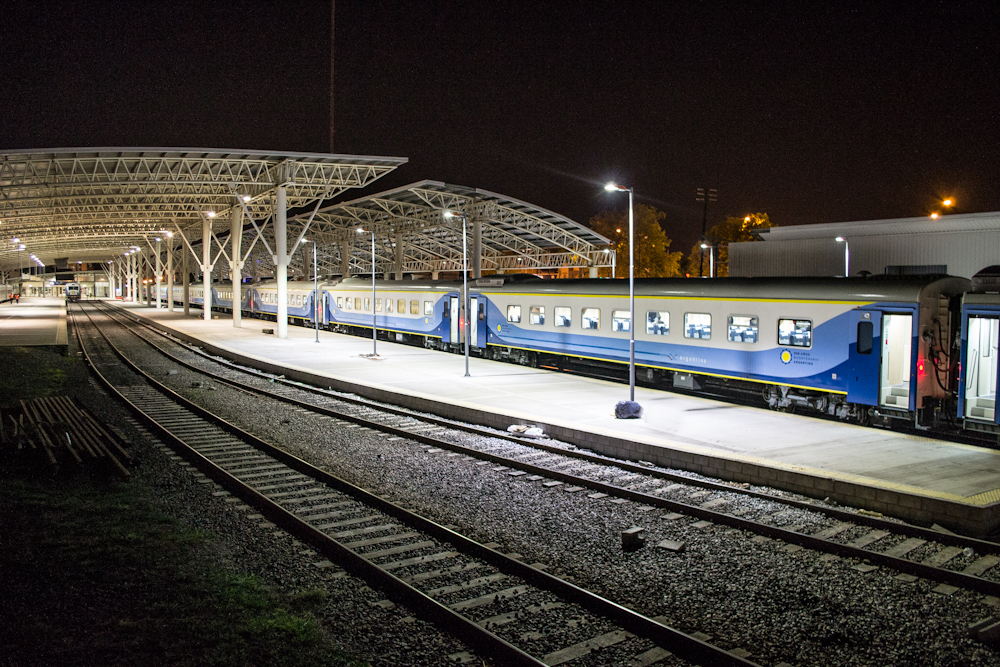
- Trenes Argentinos CNR CKD8 trains at station platforms, December 2014

General information
- Location: San Juan 1473, Mar del Plata; Argentina
- Coordinates: 37.9884°S 57.5641°W
- System: Regional
- Owner: Government of Argentina
- Operator: Trenes Argentinos
- Line: Roca
- Distance: 400 km (250 mi) from Buenos Aires
- Bus stands: 42
- Bus operators: Yes

Construction
- Platform levels: 5

History
- Opened: 2009; 17 years ago (Note: In 2009 the station opened as bus terminal only. In 2011, the railway section was inaugurated.)

Passengers
- 2,200,200
Location

Mar del Plata (officially named "Estación Ferroautomotora Eva Perón") is a railway and bus terminus in the homonymous city of Buenos Aires Province, Argentina. Opened in 2009 as a bus terminus only, the railway tracks from the old "Norte" station (distant a few meters from there) were extended to connect both terminals in 2011 by architect Claudio Luis Lucarelli, adding new platforms to receive trains from Buenos Aires.

Station facilities include 42 bus garages, 5 railway platforms, 50 shops, 3 restaurants, 51 ticket offices, parking lots and accessible toilets.

Train services are operated by state-owned Trenes Argentinos Operaciones.

== History ==
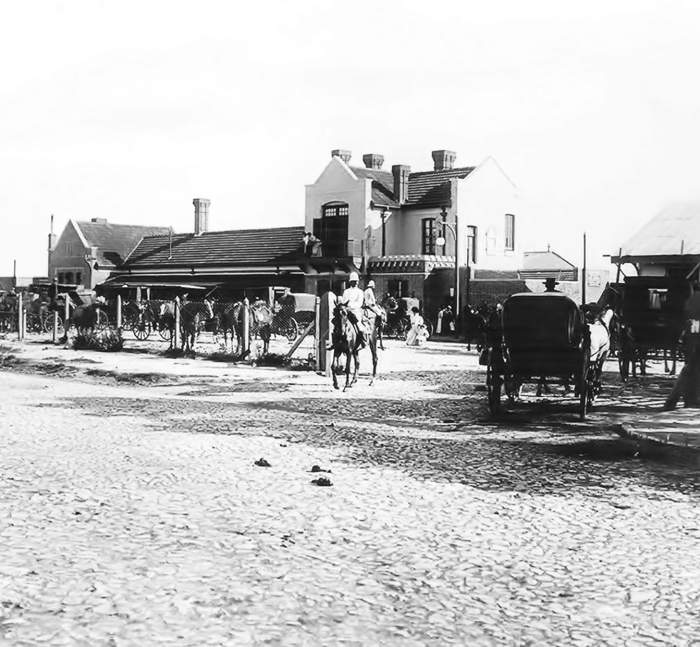
The original Mar del Plata station ("Norte"), opened in 1886

On 26 September 1886, the first train arrived to the Mar del Plata railway station, built and operated by British-owned BA Great Southern. The city of Mar del Plata was the main tourist destination in Argentina during summer season.

By 1910 Mar del Plata remained as the main beach city of Argentina, receiving a huge number of tourists during the summer. Due to the intense traffic of passengers, the railway station exceeded its capacity and the Municipality demanded the company to increase the facilities. The company had always denied to this request alleging that the station was only overcrowded during two months per year (the period of summer season in Argentina). In June 1908, the Congress promulgated Law 5.535, authorizing the BAGSR to build a new station in Mar del Plata.

Works began in 1909 and were finished one year later, when the station building began to be constructed. The new station in Mar del Plata (named "Mar del Plata Sur") was opened on December 1, 1910, although the main building was not still finished, so a provisional wooden-structure was opened to the public for the 1910–11 summer season.

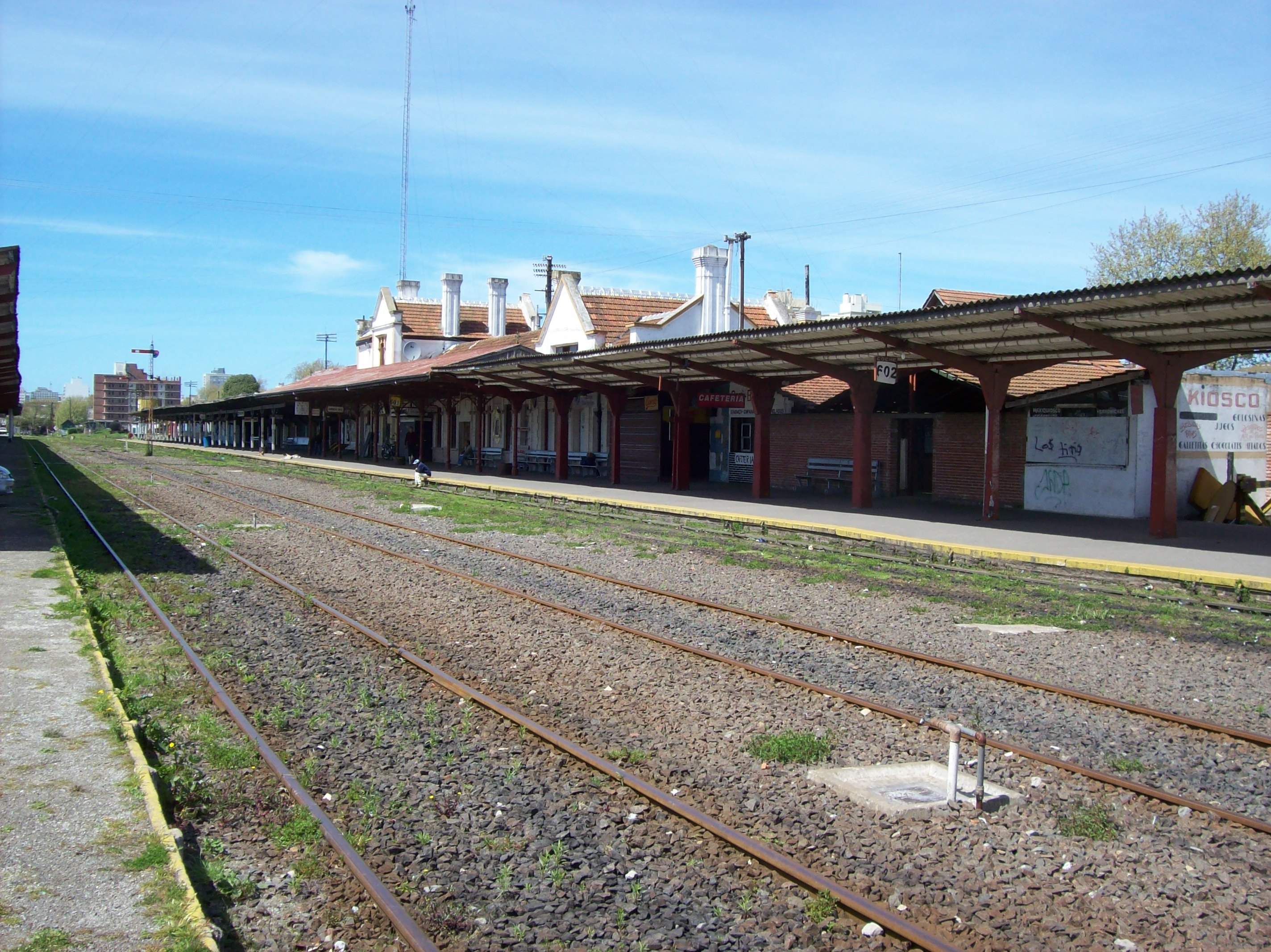
Platforms of Norte station, out of service since 2011

As the old station (renamed "Mar del Plata Norte") remained active, the new station would be only used during the summer seasons. After the entire railway network was nationalised, the Sud station was closed in 1949 to reduce costs. It then become a bus station.

In 2009, the bus terminus moved to a new building, very close to active Mar del Plata station in the centre of the city. It was also announced that the old building would be preserved as a cultural centre, alongside a new shopping mall: Paseo Aldrey, named after Florencio Aldrey Iglesias, a multimedia and which was inaugurated November 28, 2015.

Two years later, the station became a railway and bus terminal after tracks from the old "Norte" station (distant a few meters from there) were extended to connect both stations, adding new platforms to receive trains arriving from Constitución in Buenos Aires. During the inauguration, it was announced that the terminus was able to operate 1,200 bus services and 11 trains, with a transit of 2,200,200 passengers per day. The buses section was built at a cost of $19.5 million while the trains section cost $117.4.

Likewise, train units made by Spanish company Talgo were also featured in the inauguration. A total of two trains (consisting of 1 diesel locomotive and 9 coaches each) were acquired by the Government of Argentina. The Talgo units had a capacity of 214 passengers, all of them provided with air conditioning and TV. Time estimated for the journey was 5 and a half hours.

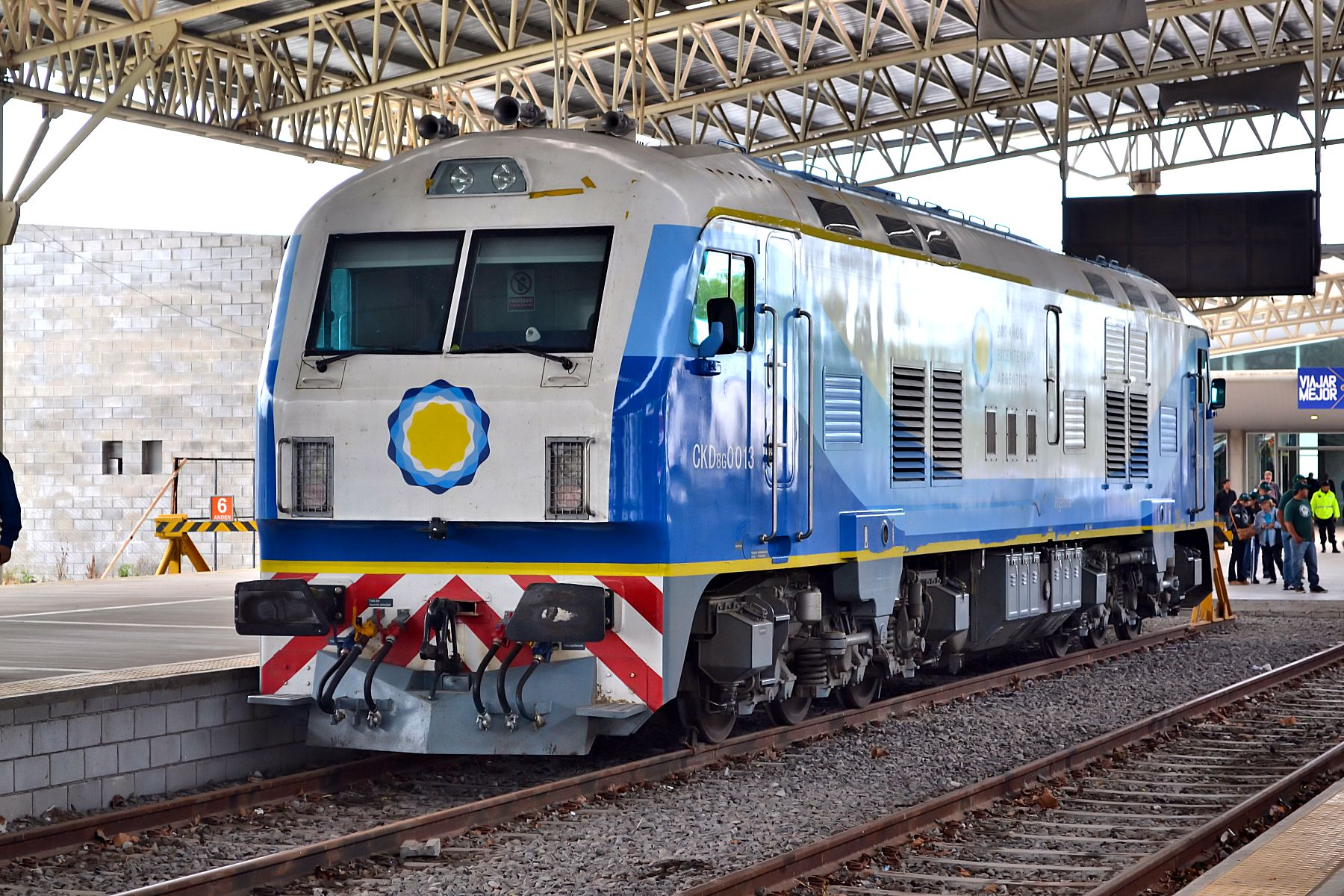
CSR locomotive in the station, Nov 2014

Nevertheless, in 2012 the Talgo trains were retired from service. The Government alleged that trains maintenance and service costs were too expensive. Ministry of Transport said that the contract with Talgo had been revoked. A total of 6 trains had been purchased although only two of them were running.

In 2014, CNR CKD8 trains manufactured by Chinese company CSR were acquired by the National Government to run luxury services to Mar del Plata. The first CSR unit arrived to Mar del Plata station in November 2014. Those trains have a capacity for 565 passengers. Each unit has 12 coaches (with five first class travel, four pullman and 1 restaurant carriage, among them).

Nevertheless, in 2015 long-distance services from Constitución to Mar del Plata were suspended due to the bad conditions to run trains. Tracks and sleepers broken, a deficient signalling system, poor visibility in level crossings, and bad conditions of the communication systems, were some of the reasons alleged. After over two years, in July 2017, the Constitución–Mar del Plata service was reestablished, with two daily services that include 12 intermediate stops in cities such as Brandsen, Chascomús, Lezama, Dolores and General Guido among others.

== See also ==
- Mar del Plata Norte (former station, closed in 2011)
- Mar del Plata Sud (former station and bus terminal)
