= General Roca Railway =

Argentine railway line

Roca Railway
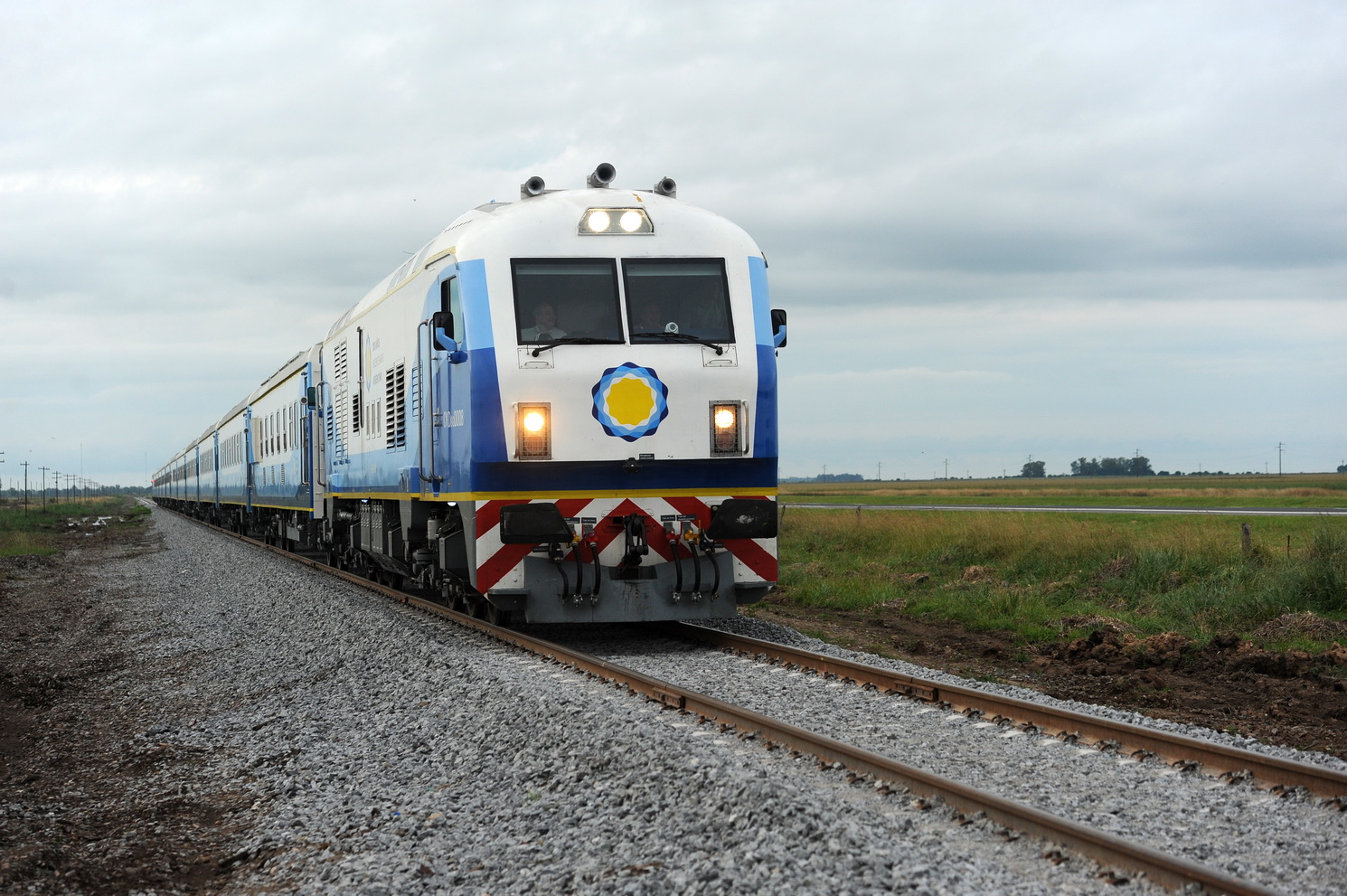
- CNR CKD8G train travelling to Mar del Plata, March 2015.

Overview
- Native name: Ferrocarril Roca
- Status: Active
- Owner: Government of Argentina
- Locale: Buenos Aires; La Pampa; Neuquén; Río Negro
- Termini: Constitución; Zapala Bariloche

Service
- Type: Inter-city
- Operator(s): Trenes Argentinos (passenger); Ferrobaires (passenger); Ferrosur Roca (freight); Ferroexpreso Pampeano (freight); Nuevo Central Argentino (freight)

History
- Opened: 1948; 78 years ago

Technical
- Track gauge: 1,676 mm (5 ft 6 in)
Route map
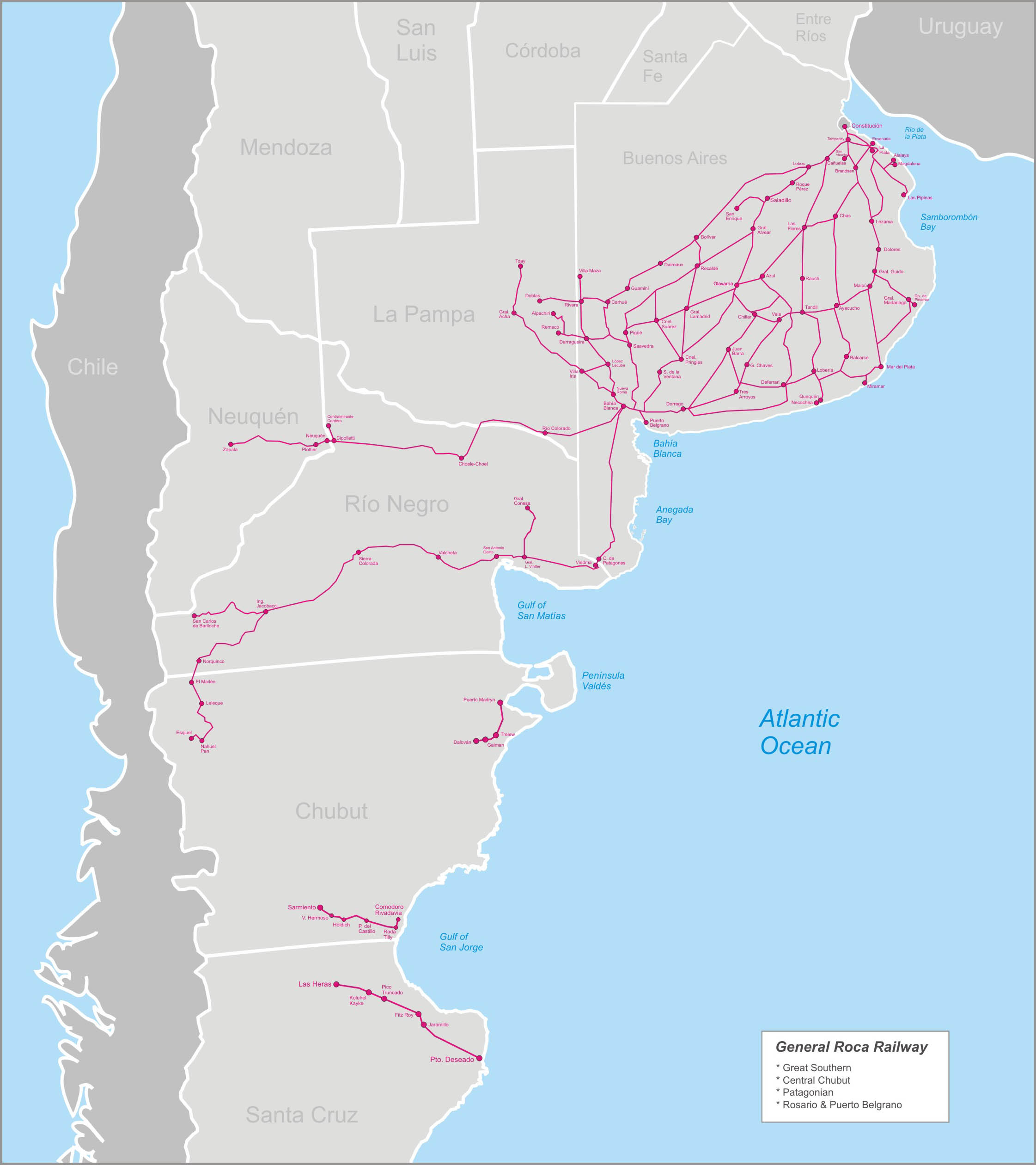

The General Roca Railway (FCGR) (native name: Ferrocarril General Roca) is a 5 ft 6 in (1,676 mm) broad gauge railway in Argentina which runs from Constitución station in Buenos Aires to the south of the country through the provinces of Buenos Aires, La Pampa, Neuquén and Río Negro. It was also one of the six state-owned Argentine railway divisions formed after President Juan Perón's nationalisation of the railway network in 1948, being named after former president Julio Argentino Roca. The six companies were managed by Ferrocarriles Argentinos which was later broken up during the process of railway privatisation beginning in 1991 during Carlos Menem's presidency.

The Roca Railway is currently operated by State owned companies Trenes Argentinos (that operates commuter rail services in Buenos Aires) and Ferrobaires (for long-distance services) while freight transport is run by private companies Ferrosur Roca and Ferroexpreso Pampeano.

== History ==
=== Background ===
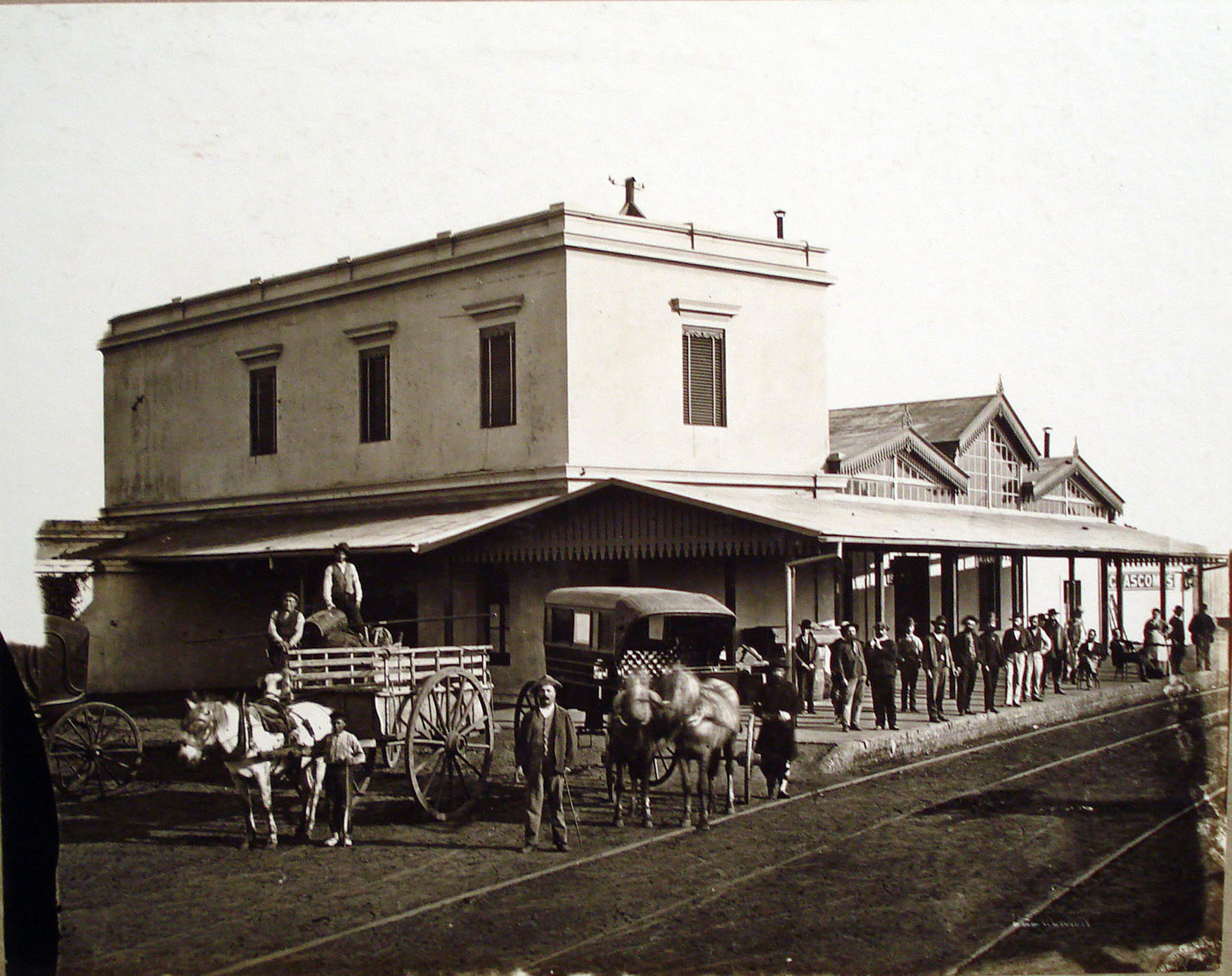
Chascomús station in 1875.

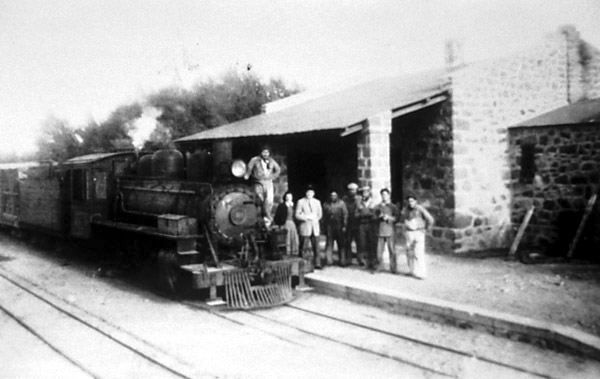
Boca de Zanja station of Chubut.

The first company to build a railway at the south of Buenos Aires was British-owned Buenos Aires Great Southern Railway, which inaugurated its first section Constitución railway station to Jeppener in 1865, extending its rail tracks to the city of Zapala in Río Negro Province and Carmen de Patagones in Buenos Aires.

The BAGSR was one of the largest companies with 8,149 km. of track at the time of its nationalisation in 1948. The Buenos Aires and Ensenada Port Railway (acquired by the BAGSR in 1898) was another company that built lines in the Buenos Aires Province, having been inaugurated in 1872.

At the beginning of the 20th century the Government of Argentina had established the Argentine State Railway, which focused on building railway lines in several regions of Argentina. With the purpose of helping to populate Patagonia and to contribute to the commercial development of the Argentina's southern provinces, the ASR built lines there through its subsidiary Ferrocarriles Patagónicos. The first railway built was the Puerto Deseado Railway, opened in 1911 in order to contribute to the commercialization of wool in the region.

The Argentine State opened other lines across Patagonia, most notably the Patagonian Express, familiarly known as La Trochita that made its inaugural trip in 1935.

The BAGSR also took over the section built and operated by the Bahía Blanca and North Western Railway that extended to Darragueira and Toay in La Pampa Province.

=== Nationalisation ===
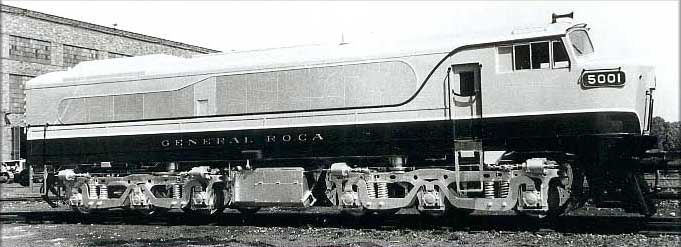
A Baldwin locomotive acquired for the line in 1953.

The General Roca Railway was named after the former Argentine president Julio Argentino Roca, was one of the six state-owned Argentine 5 ft 6 in (1,676 mm) railway divisions formed after President Juan Perón's nationalisation of the railway network in 1948. The six companies were managed by Ferrocarriles Argentinos which was later broken up during the process of railway privatisation beginning in 1991 during Carlos Menem's presidency.

FCGR incorporated the British-owned Buenos Aires Great Southern Railway, the southern section of the French-owned Rosario and Puerto Belgrano Railway and the Central Chubut Railway (which had been nationalised in 1920) and Ferrocarriles Patagónicos from the state-owned Argentine State Railway.

The following broad gauge railway companies were added to the Ferrocarril Roca network after its 1948 nationalisation:

Ferrocarril General Roca
| Former company | Origin | Opened | Provinces |
| BA Great Southern ^{(1)} | British | 1862 | Buenos Aires, La Pampa, Río Negro, Neuquén |
| Patagonian | Argentine | 1911 | Río Negro, Neuquén, Chubut, Santa Cruz |
| Rosario & Pto. Belgrano ^{(2)} | French | 1912 | Santa Fe, Buenos Aires |

Notes:

- ^{(1)} The BAGSR had previously acquired Bahía Blanca & North Western and Buenos Aires & Ensenada railways before being built by the Argentine state.
- ^{(2)} The south section of the R&PBR (from Ingeniero Beaugey to Pto. Belgrano) only.

=== Services to the Atlantic coast ===
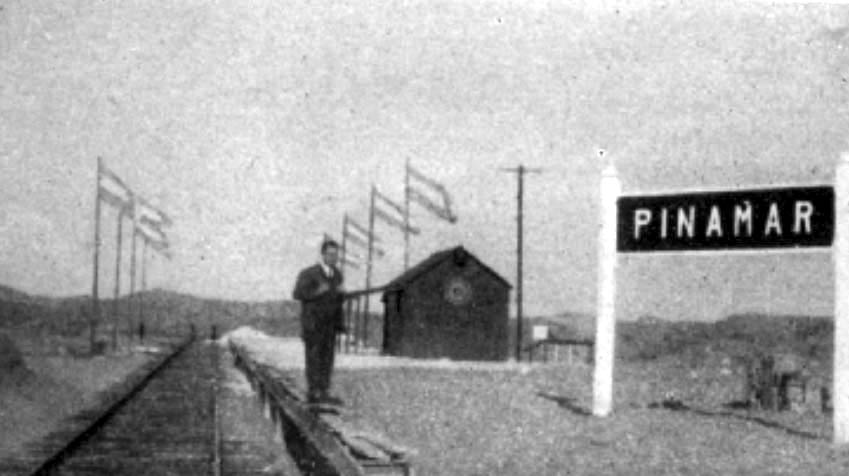
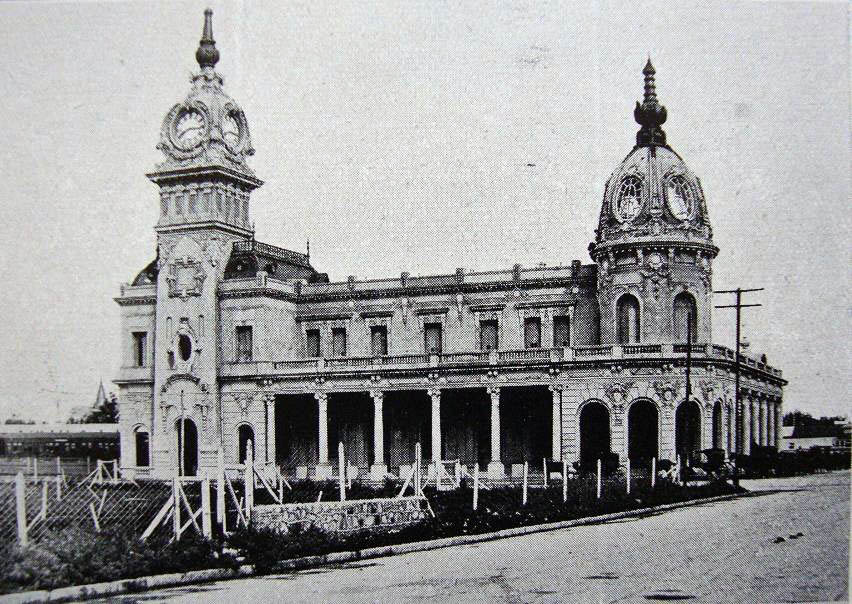
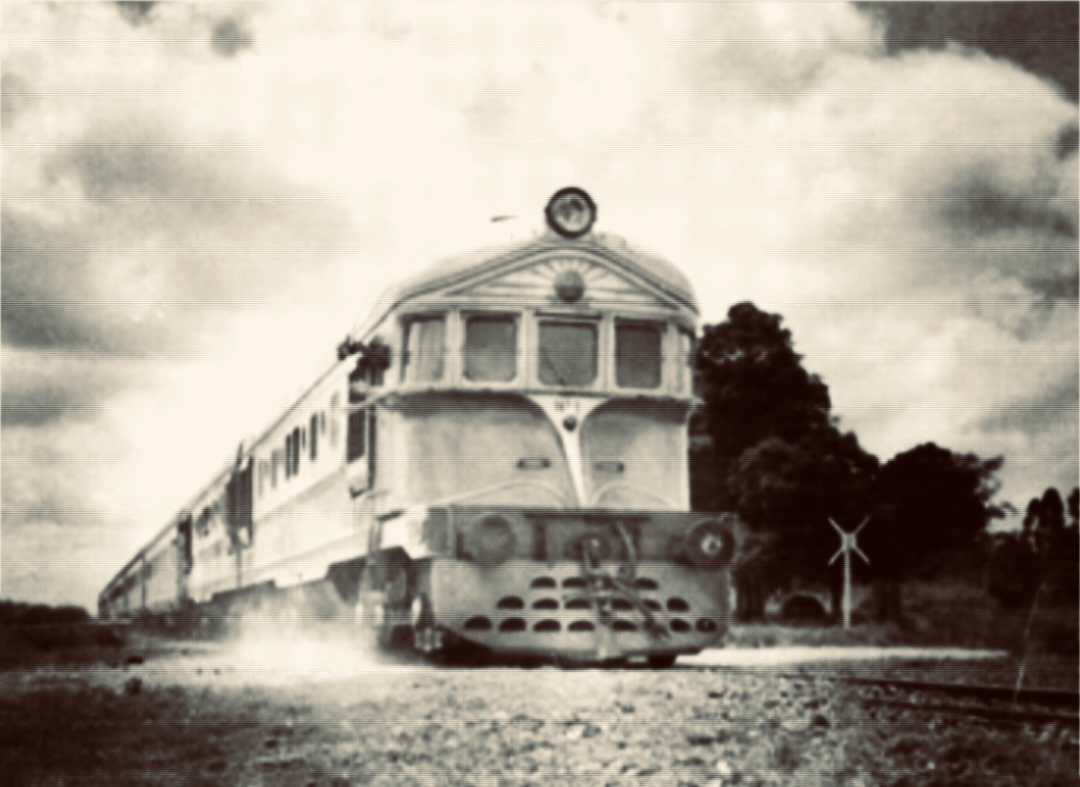
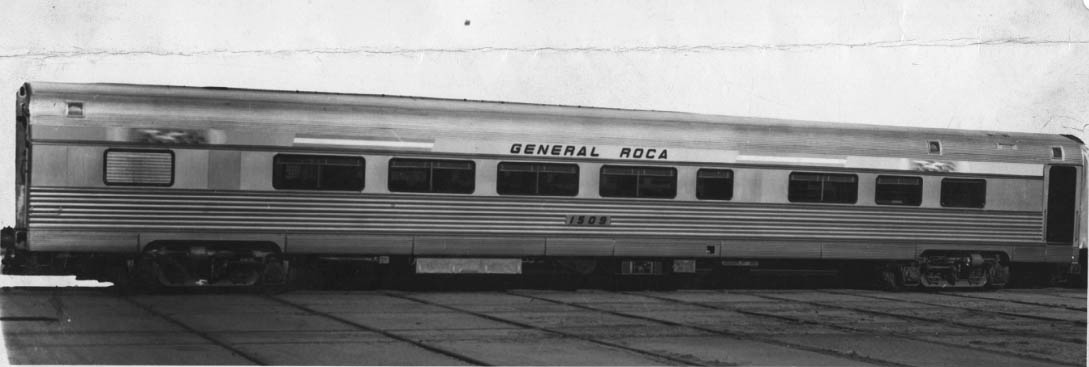
Fltr (above): Pinamar station in 1949; Mar del Plata Sud station, closed in 1949; (below); Argentine FADEL locomotive Justicialista pulled express services to Mar del Plata; Budd coaches used for that line

In General Madariaga Partido (which included cities of Villa Gesell and Pinamar by that point) the Roca Railway owned a freight line branch that carried firewood to the dunes zone at the entrance to Pinamar. In 1943, the city of Pinamar was opened as a tourist centre.

After nationalisation, the Roca Railway decided to extend the branch another 470 meters, crossing the dunes and reaching the city of Pinamar. The company built a small station there which opened in August 1949, serving the line with railcars that departed from General Madariaga.

On May 3, 1949, the Mar del Plata south station was definitively closed. The Government alleged that the station was located in a zone with heavy road traffic and there were too many level crossings, causing delays since trains had to run at a very low speed when crossing the city. The building would be later be re-opened as a bus terminus. Once the south station was closed, trains moved to the north station.

In the 1950s, the Government acquired 12 coaches from the American Budd Company. Unlike old wooden coaches used until then, the American wagons were made of steel and came with comforts such as air conditioning and double glazing to insulate the passengers from noise, arm chairs, bars and restaurant carriage. Those trains had been specially designed for the Chesapeake and Ohio Railway. A high-speed 6000 HP Baldwin locomotive had been also designed to tow that train, since the original project was to run as an express service between Washington and Cincinnati. Nevertheless, C&OR withdrew the purchase due to increasing competition with air travel, therefore Budd Co. sold the trains on.

In 1951 Ferrocarriles Argentinos acquired a total of 46 coaches from Budd Co. The rolling stock, originally built for standard gauge railways, had to be adapted to indian gauge used in Roca Railway. After a probationary period, trains began to run express services to Mar del Plata with a journey time of about 5 hours.

Budd's coaches comfort features included: speakers on the seats, individual lights and tables, carpeted floor, venetian blinds, arm chairs in saloon coaches, pneumatic doors, and reclining chairs. Coaches were towed by Caprotti steam locomotives, eventually using diesel machines. In 1952 diesel locomotives by local company Fábrica Argentina de Locomotoras (FADEL) named Justicialista made their debut on the line. Those machines had been built at Liniers workshops. In 1952, the locomotives began to serve on the Constitución-Mar del Plata section to tow the Marplatense express with a journey time of 3 hours and 45 minutes.

The Justicialista also ran to Bariloche (with a journey time of 22 h 10') and Mendoza (11 h 40') at an average speed of 145 km/h and remained active until the mid 1960s. Apart from Mar del Plata, the Roca Railway ran trains to other tourist centres on the Atlantic coast such as Necochea (10 services per day during the summer) via Chas or Tandil.

Other cities served by the Roca were Bahía Blanca (using Ganz Works railcars that had served on the San Antonio to Nahuel Huapi line in Bariloche). The first train departed from Constitución in 1949, taking 6 hours to complete the 640 kilometers away at 105 km/h. In 1950 the Ganz railcars were added to the Constitución-Necochea line.

=== Closures ===
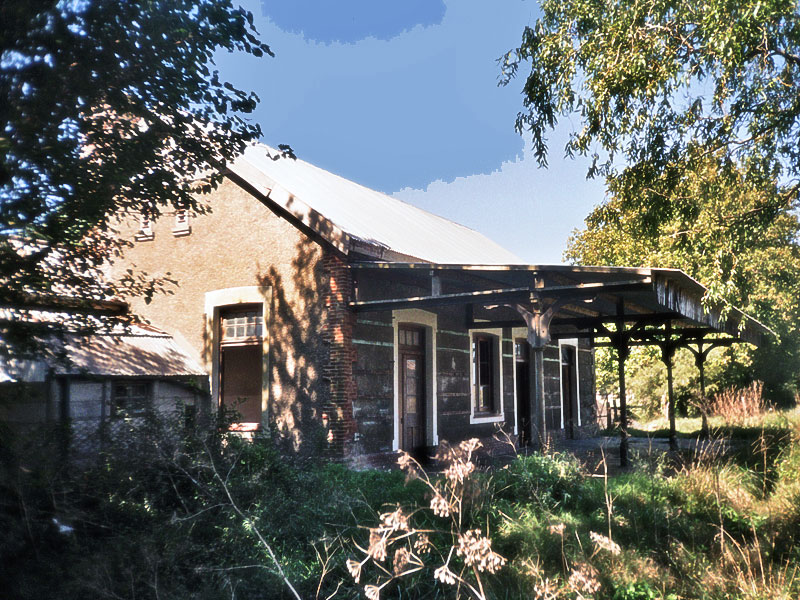
Casalins station (Chas-Ayacucho line).

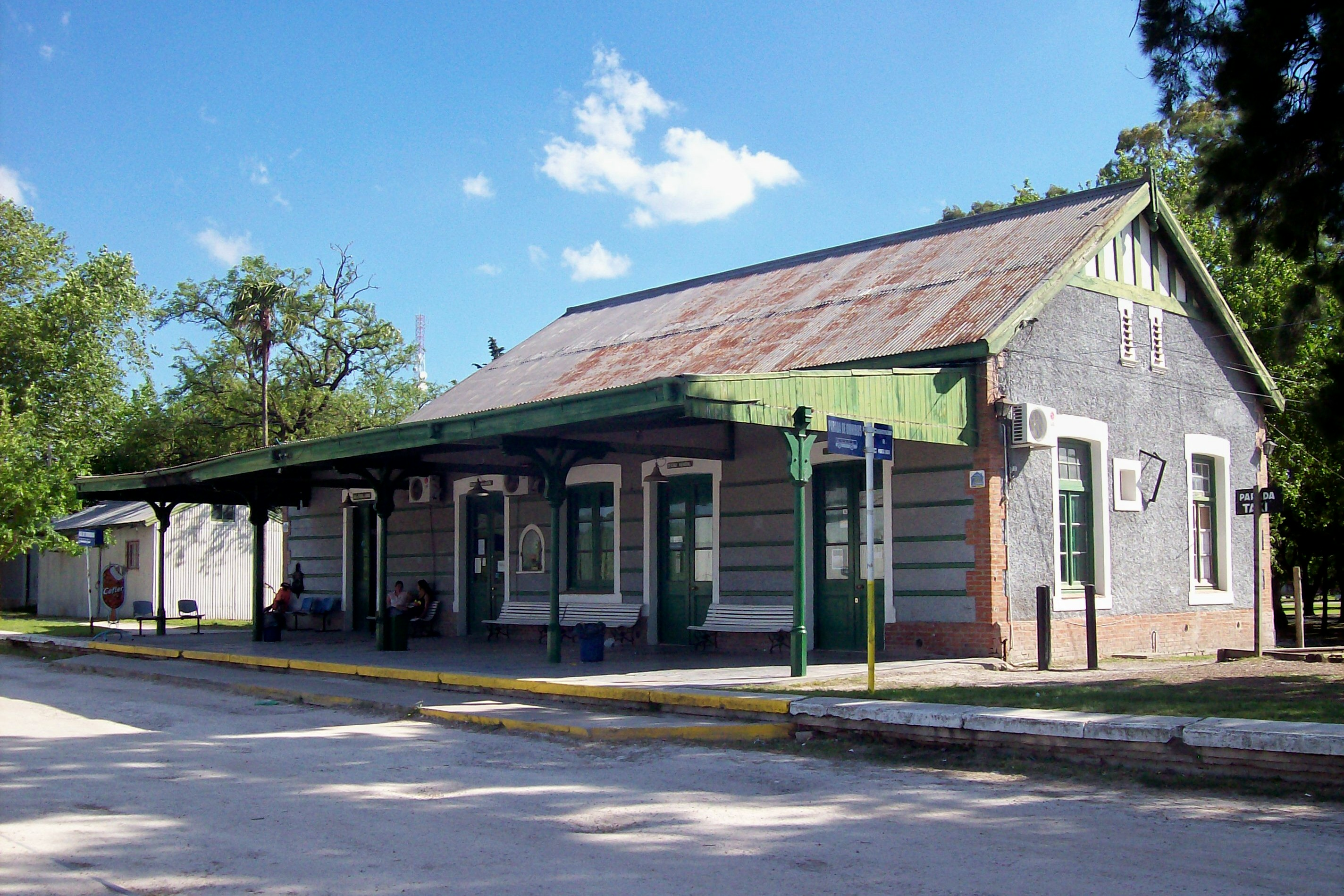
Verónica station, part of line to Las Pipinas.

The lack of maintenance and investments and the rise and competition from road and air transport were some of the contributing factors in the decline of Roca Railway services after World War II. Until 1959, the Argentine railway network totalled 44,000 km in length, although rail lines would be dismantled after then in order to reduce the budgetary deficit.

Therefore, several lines were closed in Buenos Aires Province, including the Rosario and Puerto Belgrano Railway and other branches such as Nueva Roma–Villa Iris, Chas–Ayacucho, Azul–Empalme Cerro (Tandil), Arroyo de los Huesos–Chillar, Empalme La Barrancosa–San Enrique and Alfredo Fortabat–Deferrari–Dorrego branches. In those branches rail tracks were also removed.

Other branches that were closed but not dismantled were the Empalme Piedra Echada–Toay, Chillar–Indio Rico, Barrow–Juan E. Barra, Rufino de Elizalde–Las Pipinas, Empalme Pinamar–Vivoratá and Toay–Hucal branches. In January 1962, the Bahía Blanca Noroeste station was closed, moving traffic to Bahía Blanca Sud.

In 1964 FA announced that the Necochea station would be closed. Although neighbourhoods requested that the decision be reverted, the last train to Necochea crossed the bridge over the Quequén River in December 1968, with the Government alleging that the bridge was not safe. After Necochea was closed, Quequén was set as the terminus. In 1973 a precarious stop was built to carry passengers closer to the city of Necochea. In 1977 services to Pinamar were closed due to low profitability, also removing the rail tracks that extended from Gral. Madariaga.

The decreasing industrial activity in several regions of Argentina caused some freight railway lines to also be closed, such as Pereyra-Punta Lara-Ensenada (in the port of La Plata zone) in 1978. One year later, the La Plata-Magdalena-Atalaya and Rufino de Elizalde-Lezama-Las Pipinas (served by passenger and freight trains that contributed to the commercialization of milk and cattle in the region) were also closed.

By 1980, the Roca Railway had 6,827 km of tracks, while the Government suggested to close other 5,264 km. That same year, flooding destroyed the railway bridge that joined the ports of Quequén and Necochea so the stop built seven years earlier was put definitively out of service.

=== Patagonian railways ===
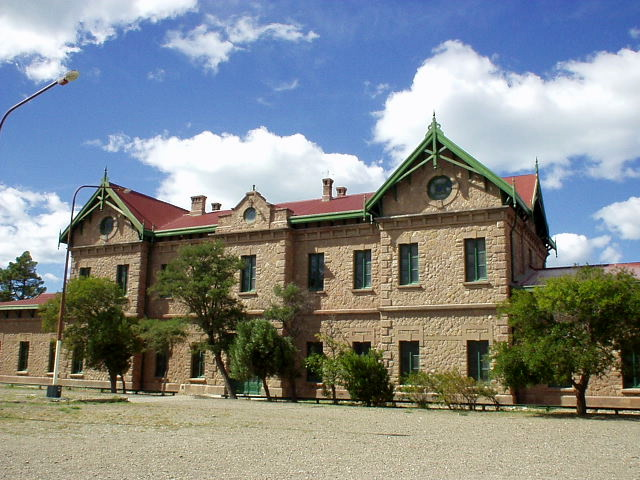
The well preserved Puerto Deseado station building.

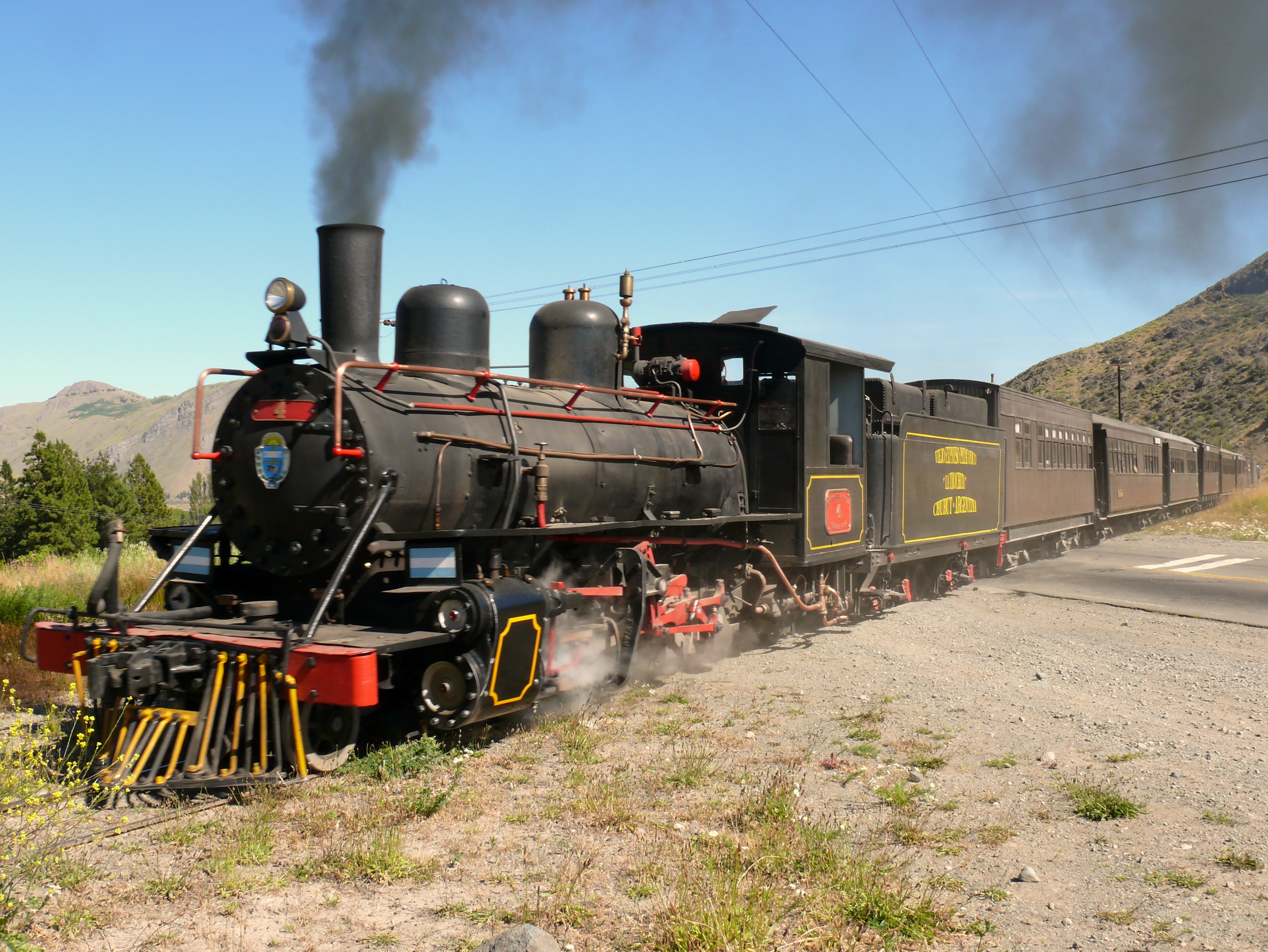
La Trochita, one of the few surviving railways of Patagonia

When railways were nationalised, State-owned company Ferrocarriles Patagónicos became part of Roca Railway in a process that started in 1949 and finished in 1956.

It was expected that FA would acquire diesel locomotives and build a 5 ft 6 in (1,676 mm) line from Puerto Madryn to Sierra Grande to extend railway to San Antonio Oeste. Nevertheless, the freight transport activity decreased due to the competition with road transport that reached its peak in the late 1950s. In 1961, the Puerto Madryn railway was closed and the station became a bus terminal.

After being closed, the Puerto Madryn railway rolling stock was transferred to other lines. There were plans to open the railway again in 1964, but after 15 coaches were destroyed by fire, the reopening could not be carried out. Rail tracks were removed in 1974. Likewise the Comodoro Rivadavia Railway was definitively closed in 1958 and the rail tracks removed.

There was a project to build a transpatagonian railway that would run along the south of Argentina from San Antonio Oeste, crossing Puerto Madryn, Comodoro Rivadavia and Puerto Deseado. The project, announced in 1957, was later dismissed. In 1979 both lines, Puerto Deseado Railway and Comodoro Rivadavia Railway were closed. Rail tracks remained untouched until the 1990s when they were removed.

The only line that survived the closing was La Trochita, because of being a tourist attraction since the 1970s. Nevertheless, the railway would be closed in 1992 during Carlos Menem's presidency, although it was later put into service again after many people protested and demanded its reopening.

=== Privatisation ===
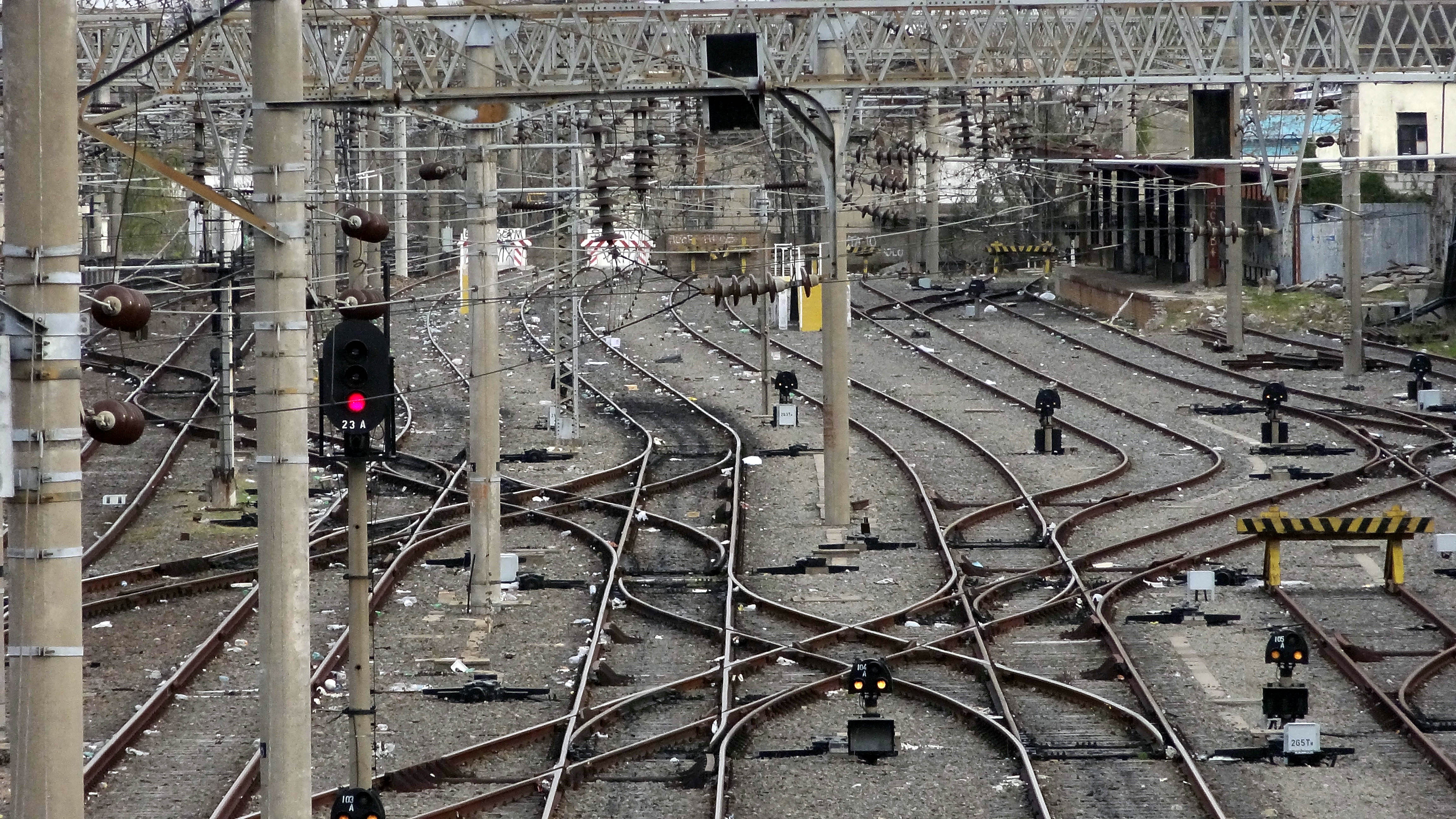
Rails and overhead lines near Constitución railway station.

By the early 1990s, most of the public companies in Argentina were unprofitable. The railway system had a deficit of about US$ 355 million per year (almost 1 million per day). The famous quote by president Carlos Menem threatening railway union workers to close the lines if they did not cease strikes ("Ramal que para, ramal que cierra" – "Railways that go on strike will be closed") became real when the Government of Argentina closed several rail lines in 1990, leaving a large amount of railway villages isolated.

According to reports, in 1960 539 million of passengers had been carried by train, while in 1990 the number decreased to 264 million. During the last year of state administration, 239,000 services were delayed or cancelled.

As part of the privatisation process, freight services were granted in concession to Ferrosur Roca and Ferroexpreso Pampeano, while commuter rail lines were given to Metropolitano.

=== Trenes Argentinos ===
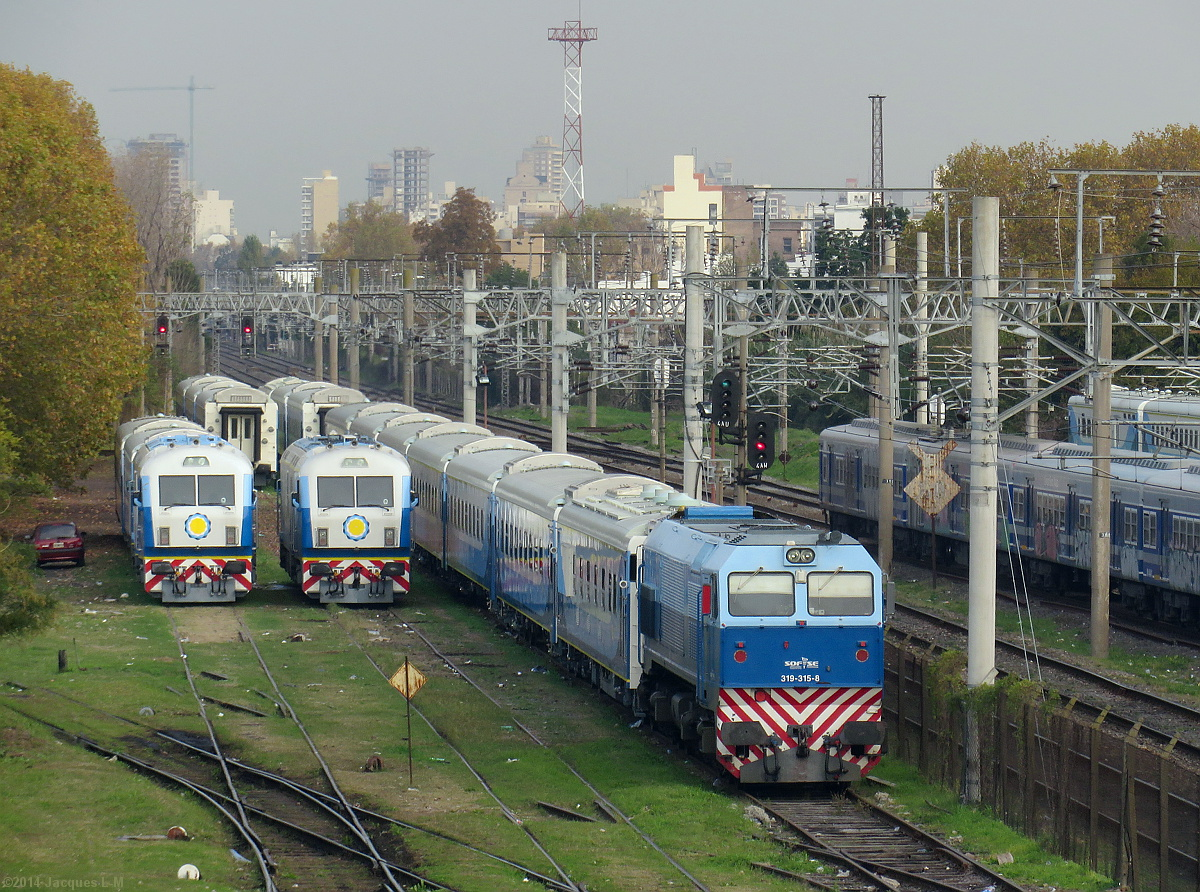
MACOSA locomotive with two CNR CKD8G locomotives stored outside a workshop (left) and a Roca Line EMU (right).

In 2011, the Mar del Plata railway and bus station was inaugurated. During the ceremony it was announced that the terminus was able to operate 11 trains services per day. The train section cost $ 117,4 million.

Likewise, train units made by Spanish company Talgo were also featured in the inauguration. A total of six trains (consisting in 1 diesel locomotive and 9 coaches) were acquired by the Government of Argentina. The Talgo units had a capacity of 214 passengers, all of them provided with air conditioning and TV. The estimated journey time was five and a half hours.

Nevertheless, in 2012 the Talgo trains were retired from service. The Government alleged that trains maintenance and service costs were too expensive. The Ministry of Transport said the contract with Talgo had been revoked. A total of six trains had been purchased although only two of them were running.

In 2014, trains manufactured by China CNR Corporation were acquired by the National Government to run luxury services to Mar del Plata. The first CNR CKD8 unit arrived to Mar del Plata station in November 2014. The trains have a capacity for 565 passengers. Each unit has 12 coaches (with five first class travel, four pullman and one restaurant carriage, among them).

== COMPANY ==
Companies operating on General Roca Railway tracks since its creation in 1948, have been the following:

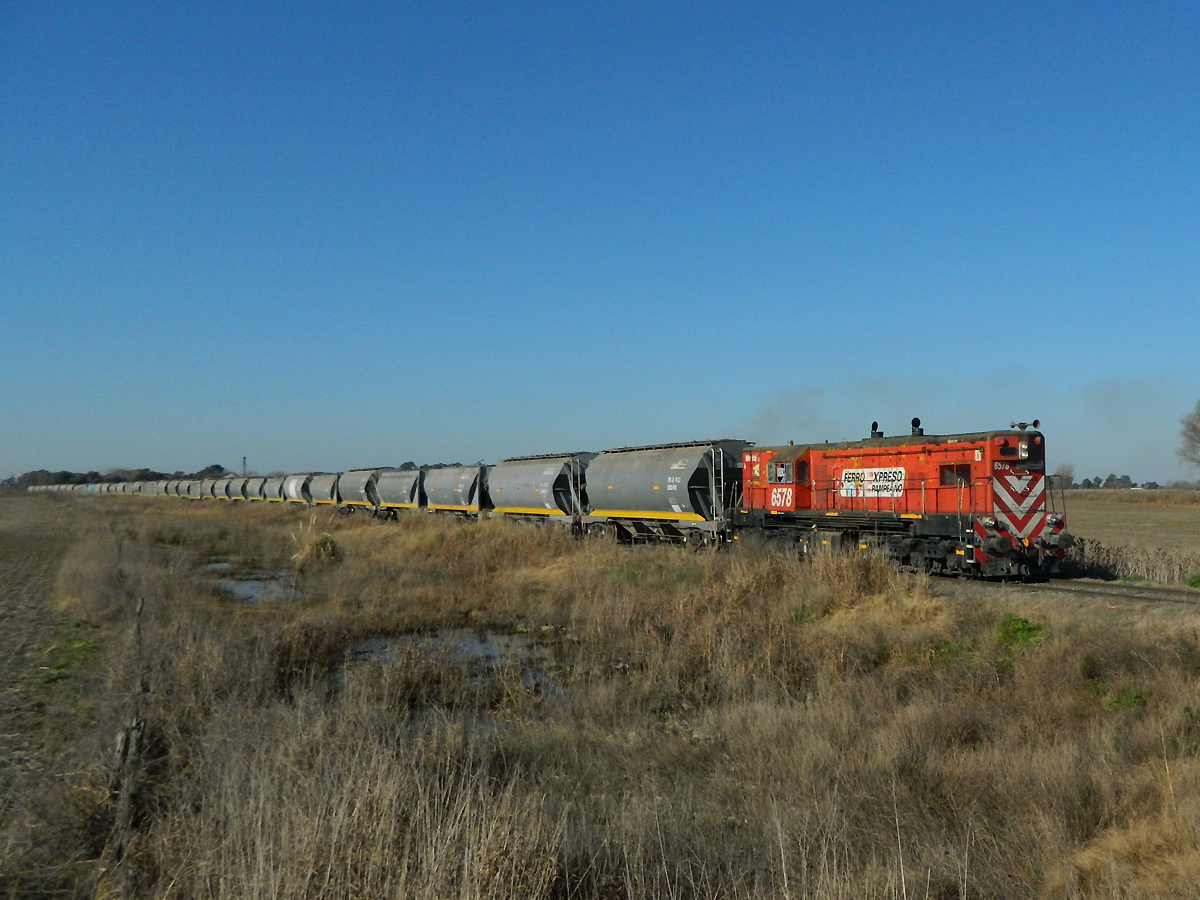
A Ferroexpreso Pampeano freight train running on the plains.

| Company | Type | Period |
|---|---|---|
| Ferrocarriles Argentinos | Passenger | 1948–1993 |
| Ferrobaires (Note: Trains in Buenos Aires Province destinations and standard services to Mar del Plata.) | Passenger | 1993–2018 |
| Trenes Argentinos (Note: Only operates luxury services to Mar del Plata with brand-new trains from China.) | Passenger | 2014–present |
| Ferroexpreso Pampeano | Freight | 1991–present |
| Ferrosur Roca | Freight | 1993–present |
| Servicios Ferroviarios Patagónico | Freight/Passenger | 1993–present |

== Suburban branch ==
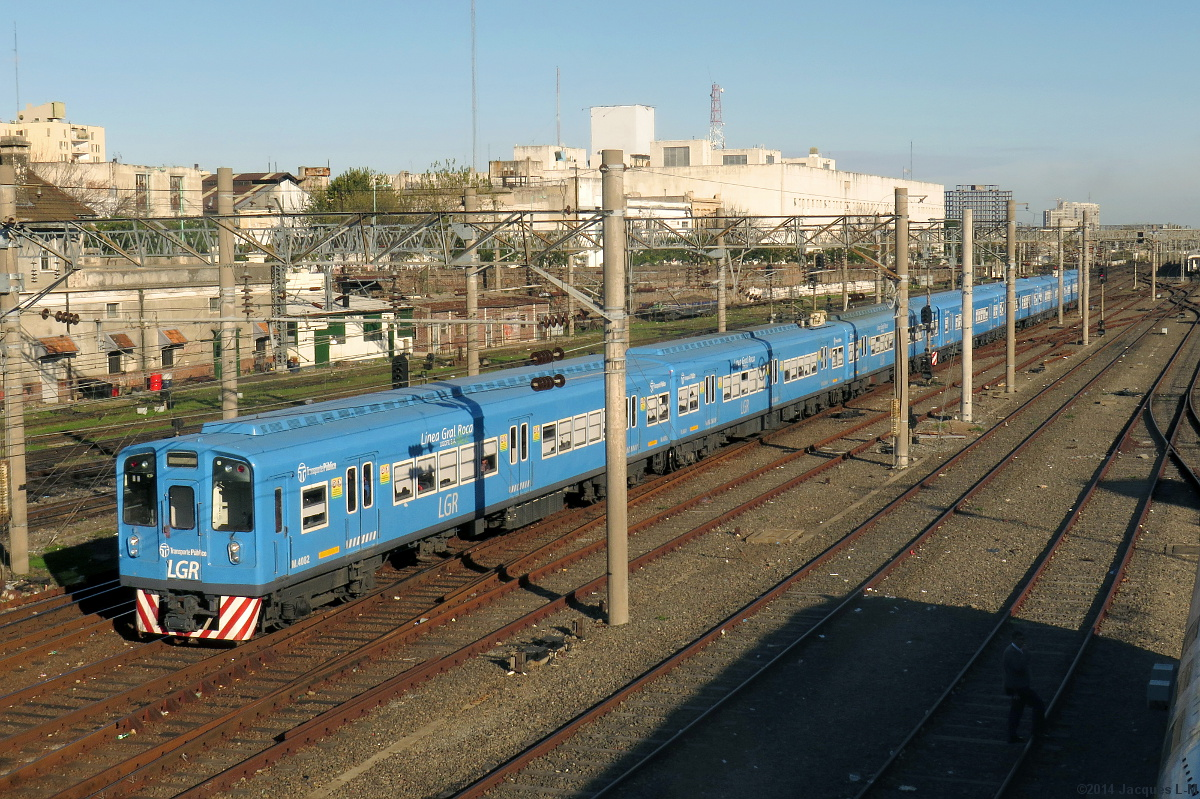
The first EMUs bought in the 1980s.

In the metropolitan sector of the City of Buenos Aires the Roca Line operates from the city-centre terminus of Estación Constitución south to Alejandro Korn, Cañuelas, and La Plata, and west to Haedo. The line has the highest ridership figures in the Buenos Aires commuter rail network, and there is an ongoing electrification initiative to electrify the remaining parts of the line which are still operate diesel services, such as from Buenos Aires to La Plata. New rolling stock from CSR Corporation Limited has also been acquired for these services, and these began to be integrated into the line in June 2015.
