= Bahía Blanca =

City in Buenos Aires Province, Argentina

- City
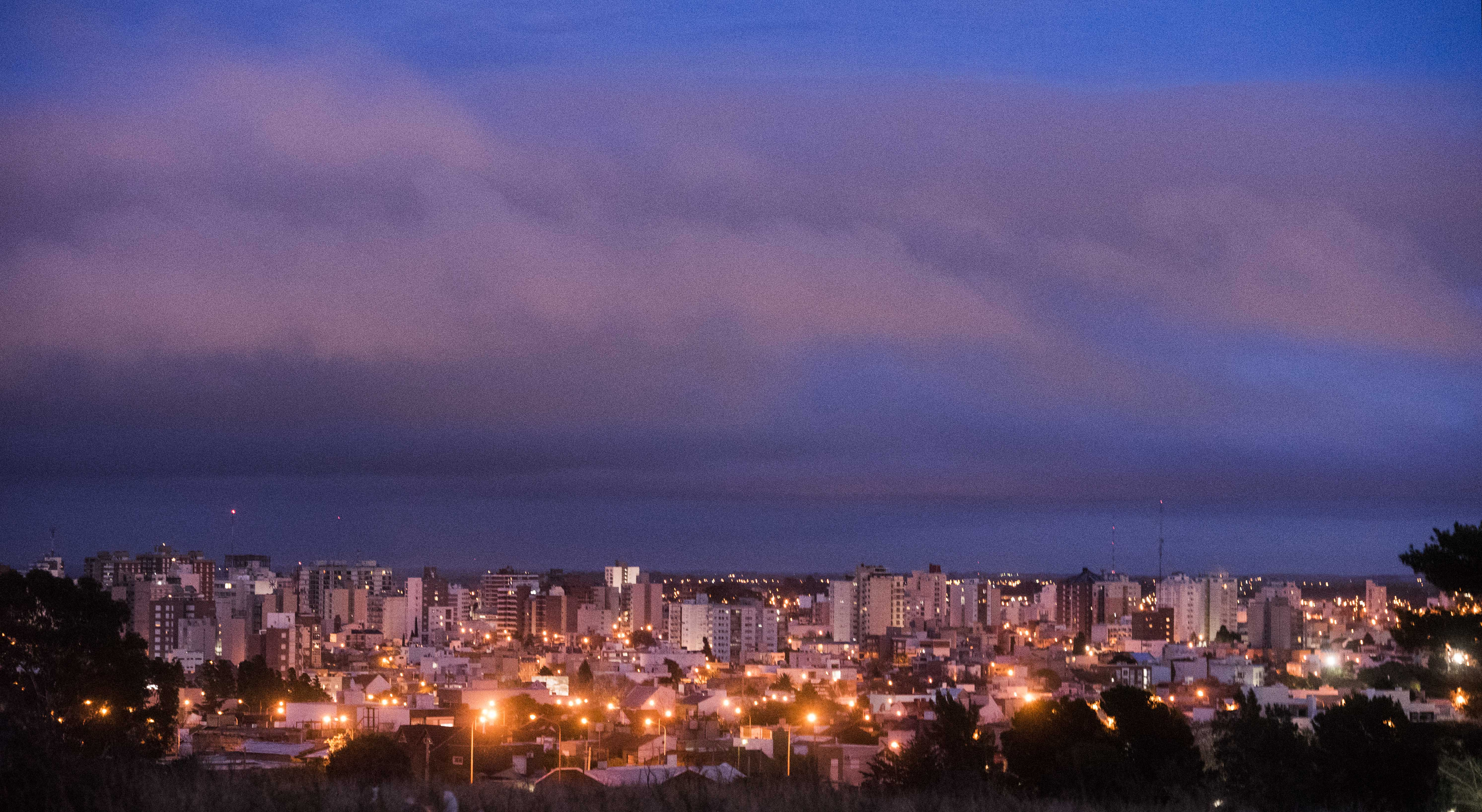
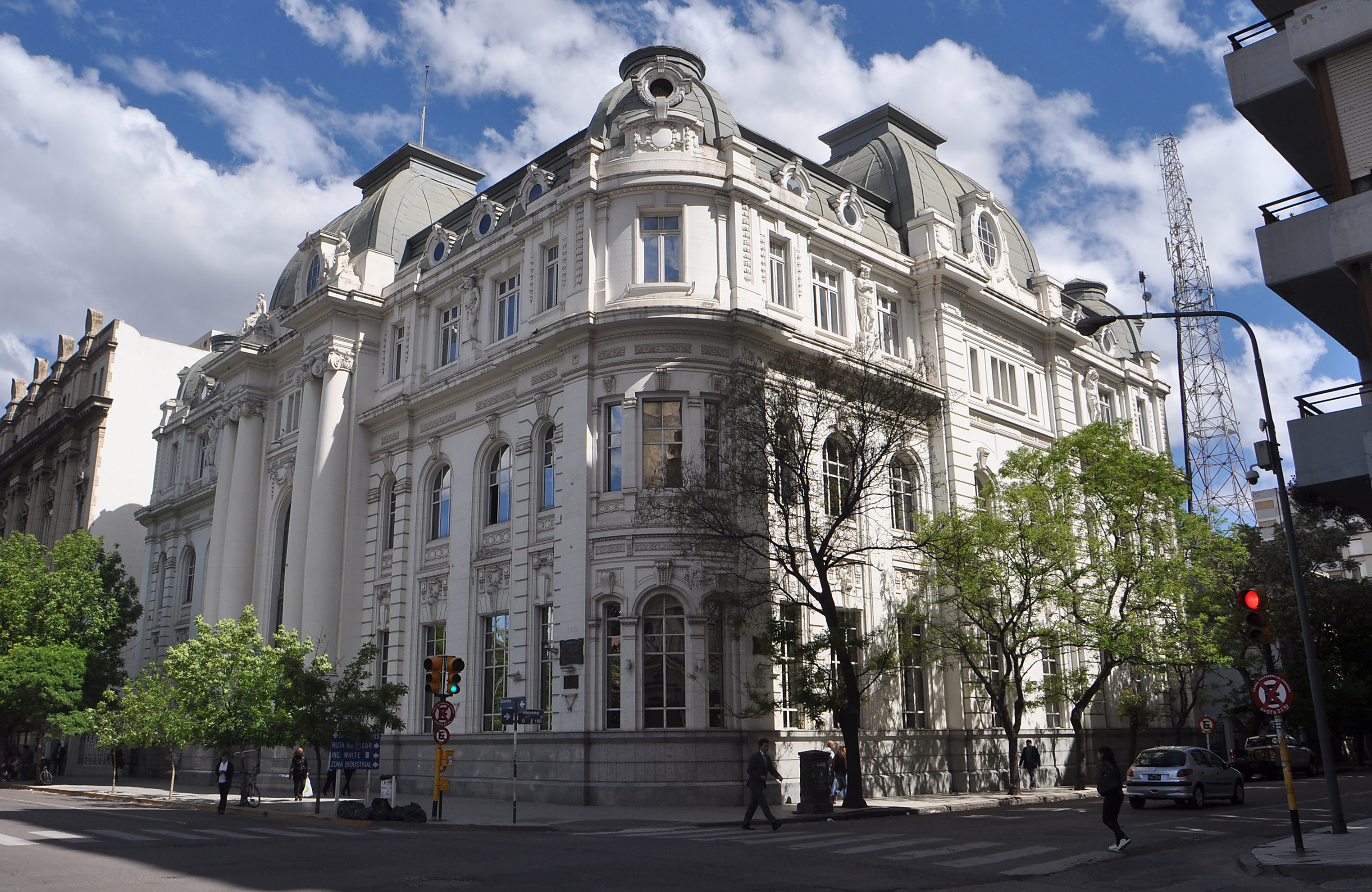
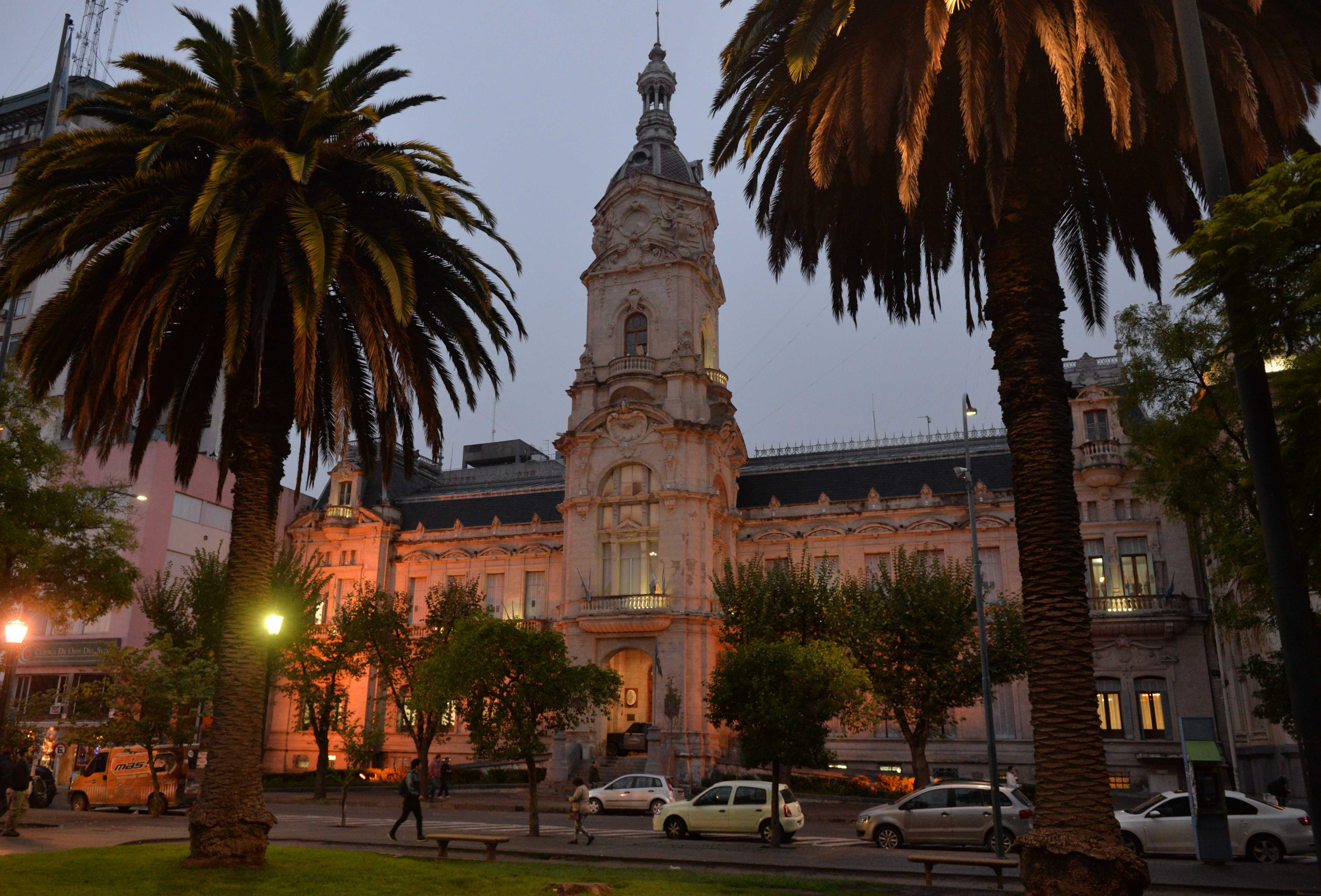
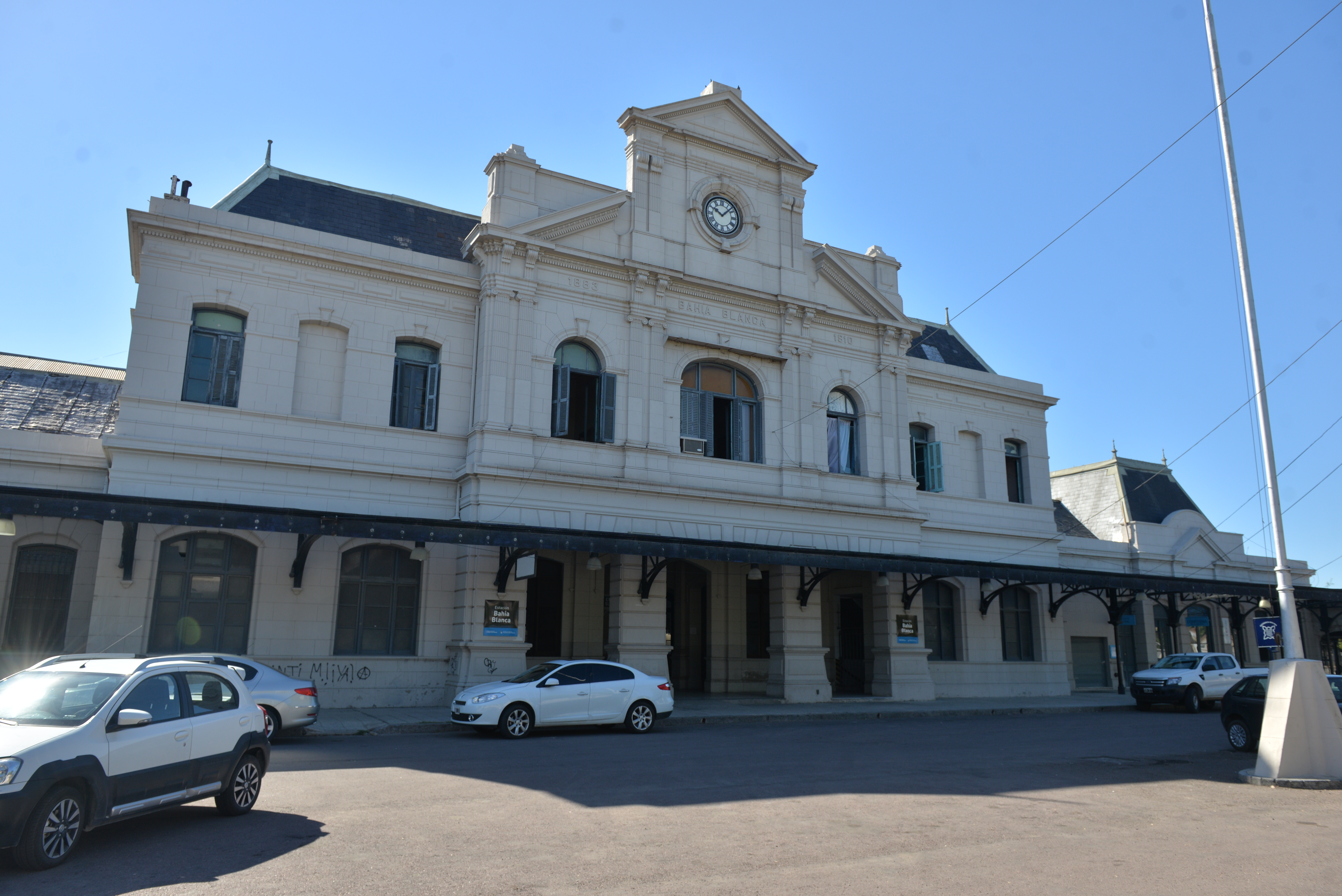
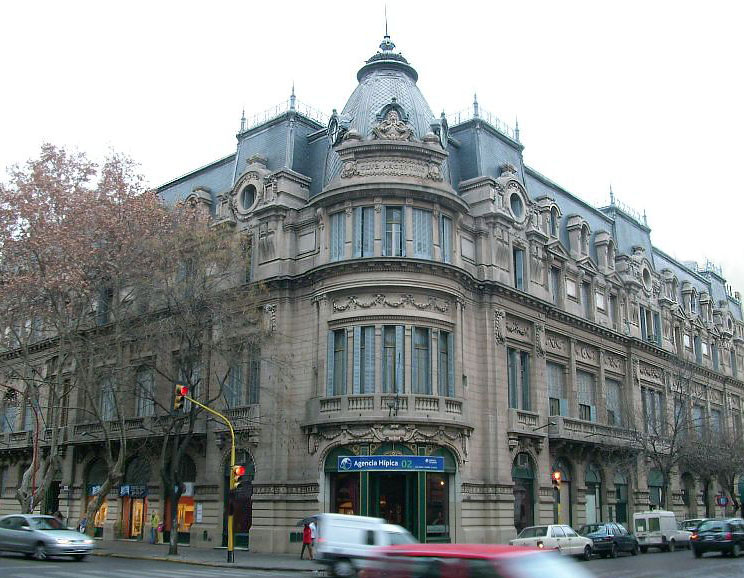
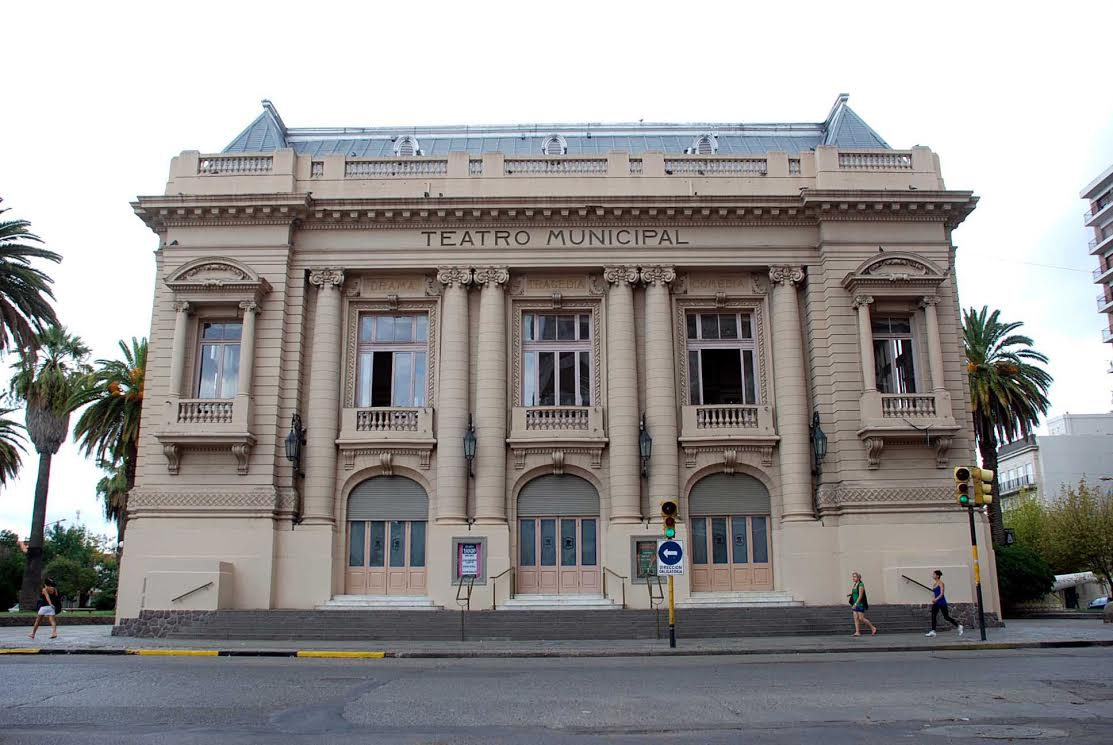
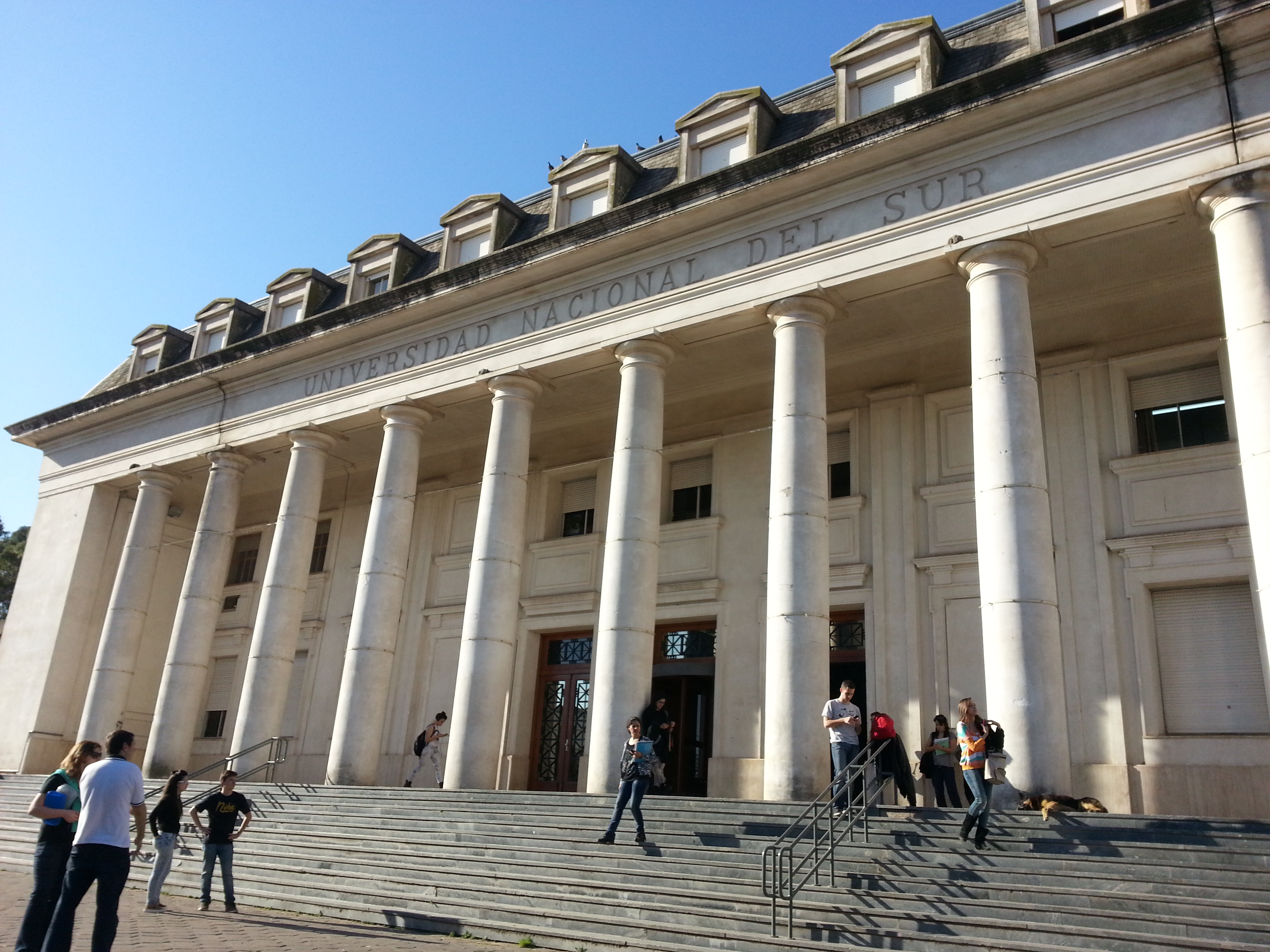
- Skyline of Bahía Blanca Argentine National Bank in Bahia Blanca Municipal Palace of Bahia Blanca Bahía Blanca Sud railway station Club Argentino Municipal Theatre of Bahia Blanca National University of the South

- Flag Coat of arms

- Location in Argentina Bahía Blanca (Argentina)
- Coordinates: 38°43′0″S 62°16′0″W
- Country: Argentina
- Province: Buenos Aires
- Partido: Bahía Blanca
- Founded: 1828

Government
  - Intendant: Federico Susbieles

Area
  - City: 2,247 km^{2} (868 sq mi)
- Elevation: 20 m (66 ft)

Population (2022 estimate)
  - Urban: 336,574
- Time zone: UTC−3 (ART)
- CPA Base: B 8000
- Area code: +54 291
- Climate: Cfa
- Website: Official website

Bahía Blanca (Spanish pronunciation: [baˈi.a ˈβlaŋka]; lit. 'White Bay'), colloquially referred to by its own local inhabitants as simply Bahía, is a city in the Buenos Aires province of Argentina, centered on the northwestern end of the eponymous Blanca Bay of the Argentine Sea. It is the 4th largest city in the province, and the 16th largest in the country by metropolitan population. It is the seat of government of the Bahía Blanca Partido, with 336,574 inhabitants according to the 2022 census [INDEC]. Bahía Blanca is the principal city in the Greater Bahía Blanca metropolitan area.

The city has an important seaport with a depth of 15 m (49 ft), kept consistent along almost the entire length of the bay, where the Napostá Stream drains.

Bahía Blanca means "White Bay". The name is due to the color of the salt covering the local soil surrounding the shores. The bay (which is an estuary) was seen by Ferdinand Magellan during his first circumnavigation of the world on the order of Charles I of Spain in 1520, looking for a canal connecting the Atlantic to the Pacific Ocean along the coasts of South America.

== History ==
The city was founded as a fortress on 11 April 1828 by Colonel Ramón Estomba on the orders of Brigadier-General and subsequent Governor of Buenos Aires, Juan Manuel de Rosas. It was initially named Fortaleza Protectora Argentina (Argentine Protective Fortress), built for the purpose of protecting inhabitants from cattle rustlers, and also to guard the coast against the Brazilian navy, which had landed in the area the previous year. It was visited by Charles Darwin during his travels through South America in September 1833. The fortress was attacked by Malones (incursions of nomadic aboriginals on horseback) several times, most notably in 1859 by 3,000 Calfucurá warriors. It became commercially important after the Buenos Aires Great Southern Railway linked the town to the city of Buenos Aires in 1885, facilitating the transport of grain from the Pampas.

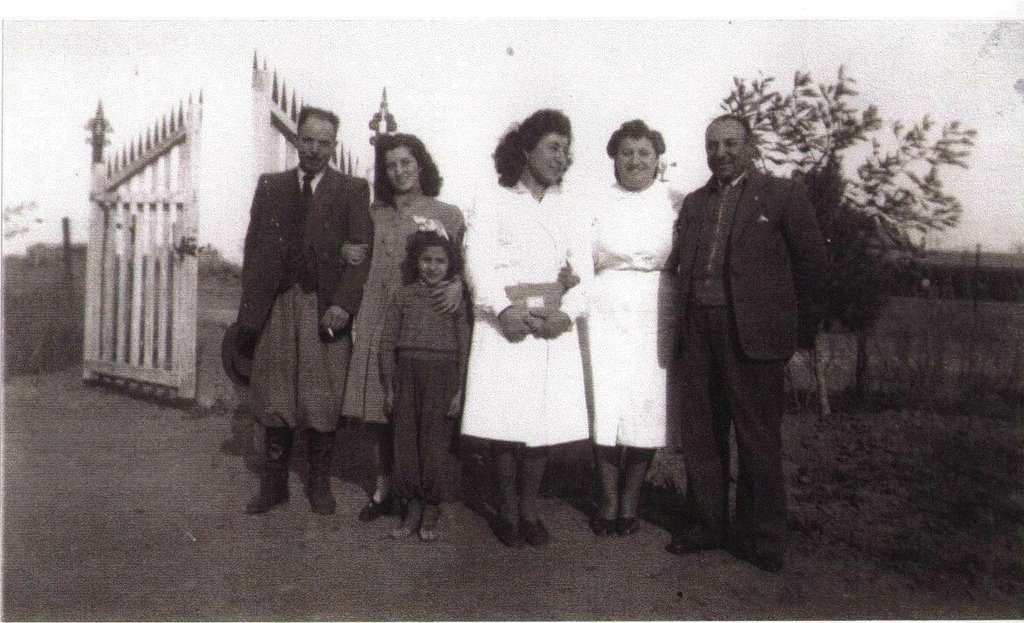
European immigrants in gaucho attire taking their children to an Argentine school, 1940.

The rapid growth of the local economy, the policy encouraging immigration from Europe, and the country's abundant natural resources attracted many immigrants, mainly from Spain and Italy, and a remarkable number from France, who settled in Pigüé, about 125 km to the north of the city. Another important foreign settlement close to the city was of Dutch settlers, in Tres Arroyos, located about 250 km northeast. Major groups of immigrants from Germany and Jews from Eastern Europe also arrived in the city and the region at the beginning of the 20th century, as well as during World War II and the post-war period.

European immigrants brought their customs and culture. There were at least five opera houses in Bahía Blanca at the beginning of the 20th century and six cinemas by 1920.

Puerto Belgrano, located 29 kilometres (18 mi) to the southeast, is Argentina's largest naval base. Its construction started with a secret decree signed by President José Evaristo Uriburu. It was designed and built from 12 May 1898 to 8 March 1902 by the Italian engineer Luigi Luiggi, and a Dutch company named Dirks, Dates & Van Hattem.

In March 2025, Bahía Blanca and neighboring towns were flooded by a 12-hour long rain. The estimated precipitation was 290 millimetres (11 in), being the most devastating rainfall in Argentina since 1975 and over half of the average annual precipitation in the city of 584 millimetres (23.0 in). The flood, preceded by unusually high humidity stretching across the north of the Patagonia region and the north of Argentina, left at least 16 deaths and hundreds of disappearances. The disaster prompted a national humanitarian effort; non-perishable food, hygiene elements, and cleaning supplies have been donated from across Argentina. President Javier Milei cancelled a trip to Chile, and the national government collaborated with Axel Kicillof, the governor of Buenos Aires Province and usually a political rival, due to the flooding. The Chilean government expressed its solidarity towards the victims, as did Volodymyr Zelenskyy, the president of Ukraine, during a phone call with President Milei. Elon Musk also announced that Starlink would offer free Internet services to Bahía Blanca residents for 30 days.

== Governance ==
The municipal government of Bahia Blanca includes the mayor, in charge of the executive branch, the city council, and the local legislation, approval and audit of the municipal budget, and a local Judiciary System, in charge of administering justice on behalf of the city regarding all the aspects of municipal legislation. The mayor and the members of the council are elected by direct vote, while the municipal judges are appointed. The mayor appoints the members of his cabinet of Secretaries who can be summoned by the council to whom they are mainly accountable.

A local political crisis in March 2006 resulted in the mayor's request for leave, which was granted by the city council on 27 March 2006. The mayor, Rodolfo Lopes, was indicted, and the case continued in the local judiciary. The president of the city council, Christian Breitenstein, then took over as interim mayor. However, on 24 August 2006, the city council decided, for the first time in the history of the city, to unseat the elected mayor. With the approval of the supreme court of the Buenos Aires Province, the interim mayor and former president of the city council was appointed to complete his predecessor's term.

== Economy ==
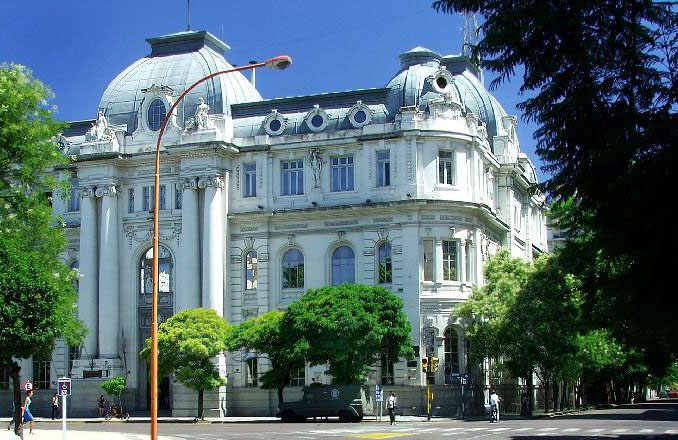
The Bahía Blanca branch of the National Bank of Argentina

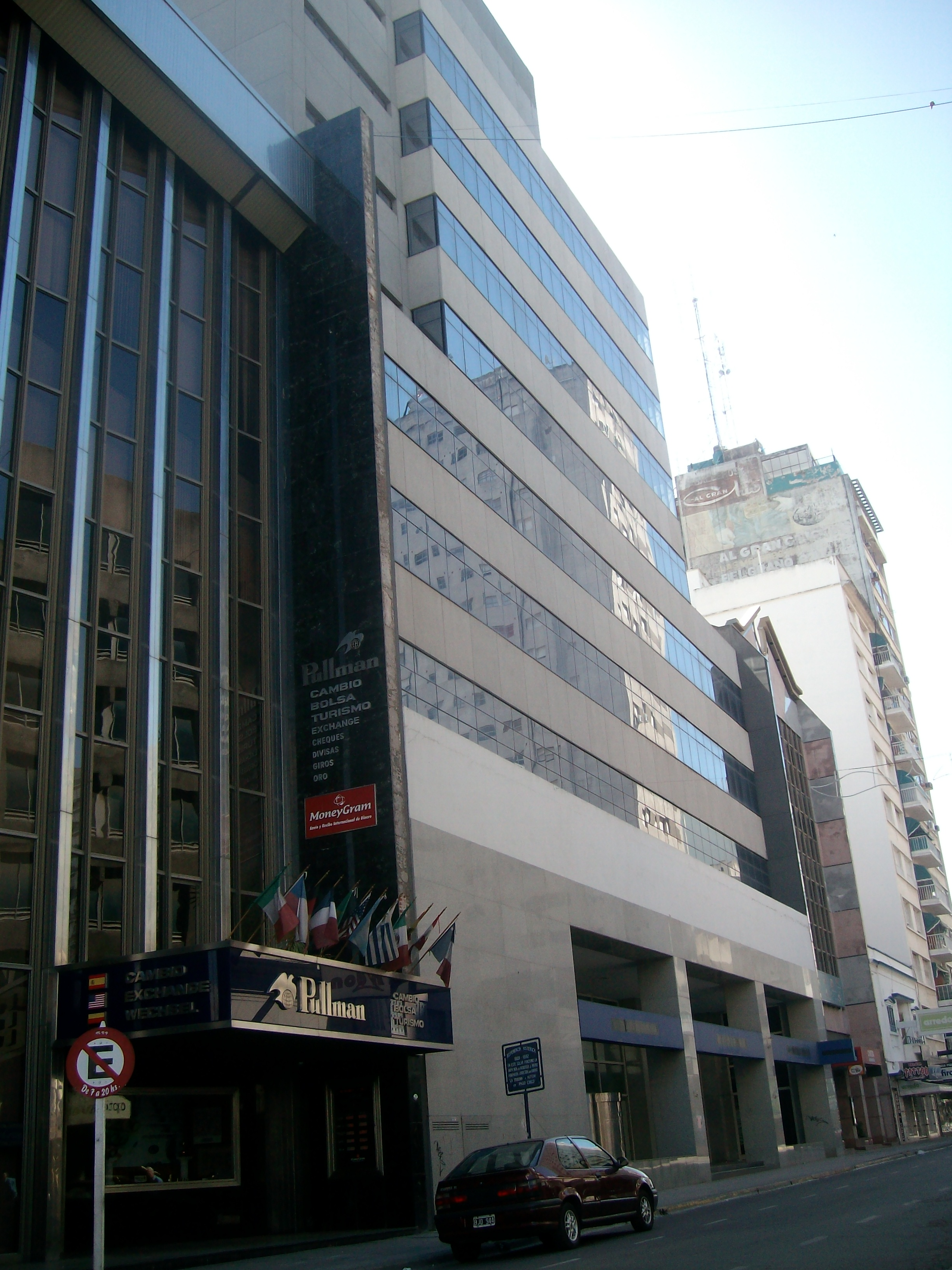
San Martín Street

Bahía Blanca is an important trans-shipping and commercial center, handling the large export trade of grains and wool from the southern area of Buenos Aires Province, oil from Neuquén Province, and fruit from the Río Negro Valley. Its group of seaports is one of the most important in the country as the only ones that are naturally 10 m (33 ft) deep, although the depth of the main channel is kept at 12.19 m (40 ft) by regular maintenance. Along the northeastern shore of the bay, these ports are Puerto Ingeniero White for grains and containers, and Puerto Galván, a smaller one specialising in sunflower and soy oil, and chemicals such as urea. One of the largest urea industrial producers in the world, Profertil, is located there. Between these two main ports, several industrial and chemical plants operate their piers. The petrochemical pole of the region made the port a very convenient one. Competence between Puerto de Bahía Blanca and those located on the shores of Patagonia (subsidized by provincial governments through the National Treasury) made it stronger and very well organized having received investments from the private sector like Cargill that upgraded facilities in the 1980s. The combination of a railroad network for grains linking Rosario, Santa Fe, by the shore of Paraná River to Bahía Blanca, and its trade potential, linking also Bahía Blanca to Zapala. the availability of energy (natural gas and electricity) and human resources make the area quite an interesting one from industrial and commercial perspectives.

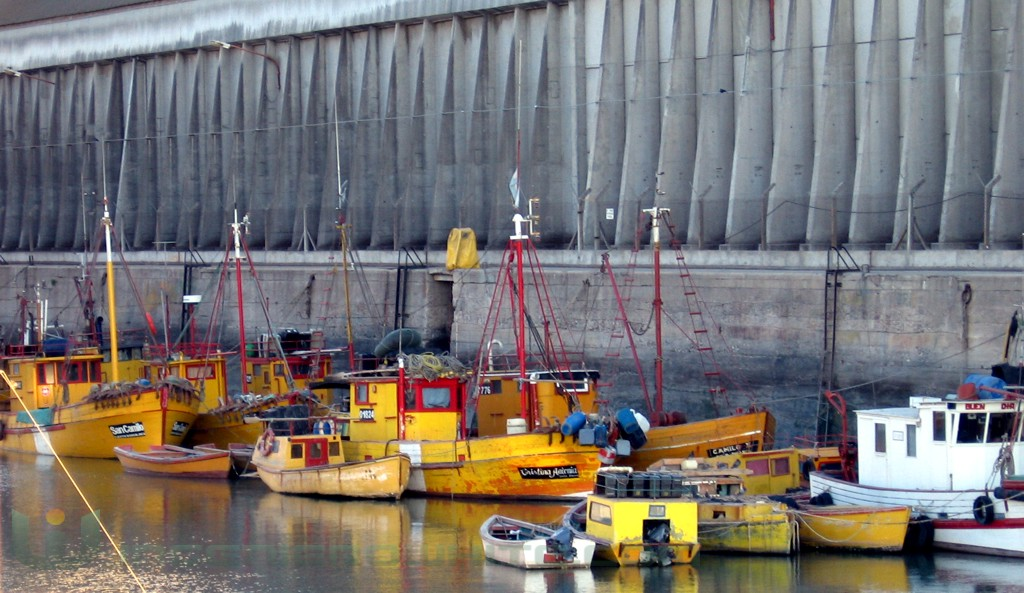
Port of Ingeniero White, Bahía Blanca

There are several local societies representing economic activities taking place in the region such as Sociedad Rural, Corporación del Comercio y de la Industria, and Sociedad Industrial, all of whom organize conferences and exhibits linked to the branch of trade, commerce, or industry their associates carry out. Some of the exhibits are quite traditional and have taken place for many years, such as "Exposición Nacional de Ganadería e Industria de la Sociedad Rural de Bahía Blanca", mainly grouping those devoted to cattle husbandry and sheep breeding, which up to 2006 accounted for 122 annual displays when there is a contest awarding prizes to the best-presented animals.

== Transportation ==
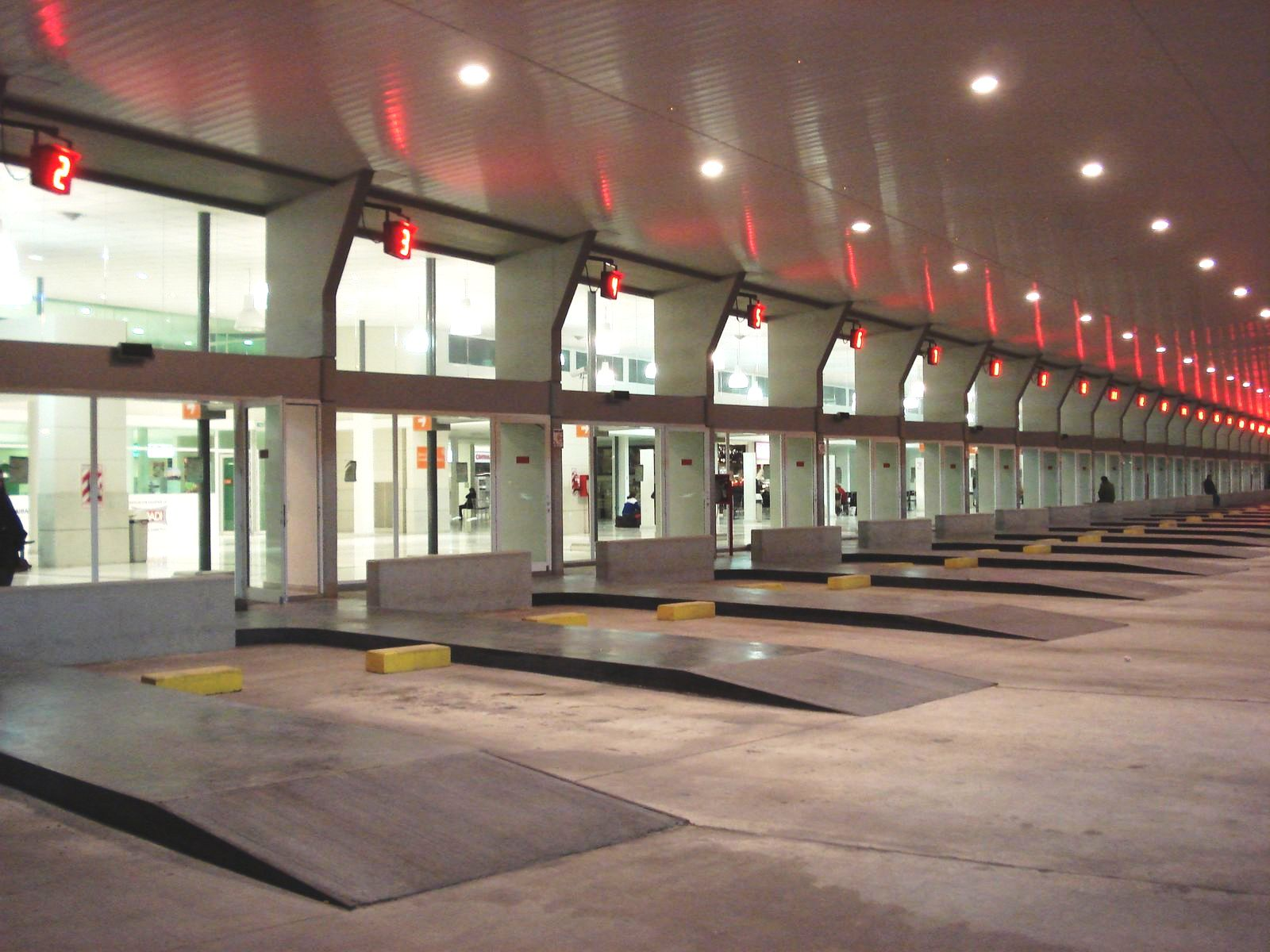
Bus terminal

Bahía Blanca is served by Comandante Espora Airport (BHI/SAZB). There are two daily short-haul flights from Bahía Blanca (BHI) to the domestic flights airport in Buenos Aires (AEP). The Navy also operates a weekly flight to and from Buenos Aires, for service people who commute between the two cities. The local airport's runways belong to the Navy Aviation (BACE, standing for Base Aeronaval Comandante Espora). There is a civilian terminal supported by the city council apart from the military one.

The bus terminal of the city, recently remodeled and redesigned, services the whole country. The bus transportation system has a wider range of short, medium and long-distance connections and destinations offering many overnight trips from Bahía Blanca to Buenos Aires, to hundreds of cities and towns throughout the country and also to neighbouring countries such as Uruguay.

A network of motorways merge in the city linking it to the region and the rest of the country. In recent years, different administrations have tried to create and improve an outer ring road by which traffic is facilitated avoiding unnecessary congestion allowing lorries or trucks, as well as automobiles, to directly enter and exit the port area. Vehicles passing by can also avoid entering the city via this ring road. There are also projects to improve the road link between the city and the airport. Multiple local bus lines form the city transportation system. The main route, Ruta Nacional 3, is divided there into 3 North, leading to Olavarría and Buenos Aires, and 3 South leading to Viedma, Trelew, Comodoro Rivadavia, Río Gallegos, Río Grande and Ushuaia. Other routes include National Route 35, leading to Santa Rosa and Río Cuarto, National Route 33, leading to Trenque Lauquen and Rosario, and National Route 22, which leads to Neuquén Province.

=== Railway ===
Stations in Bahía Blanca
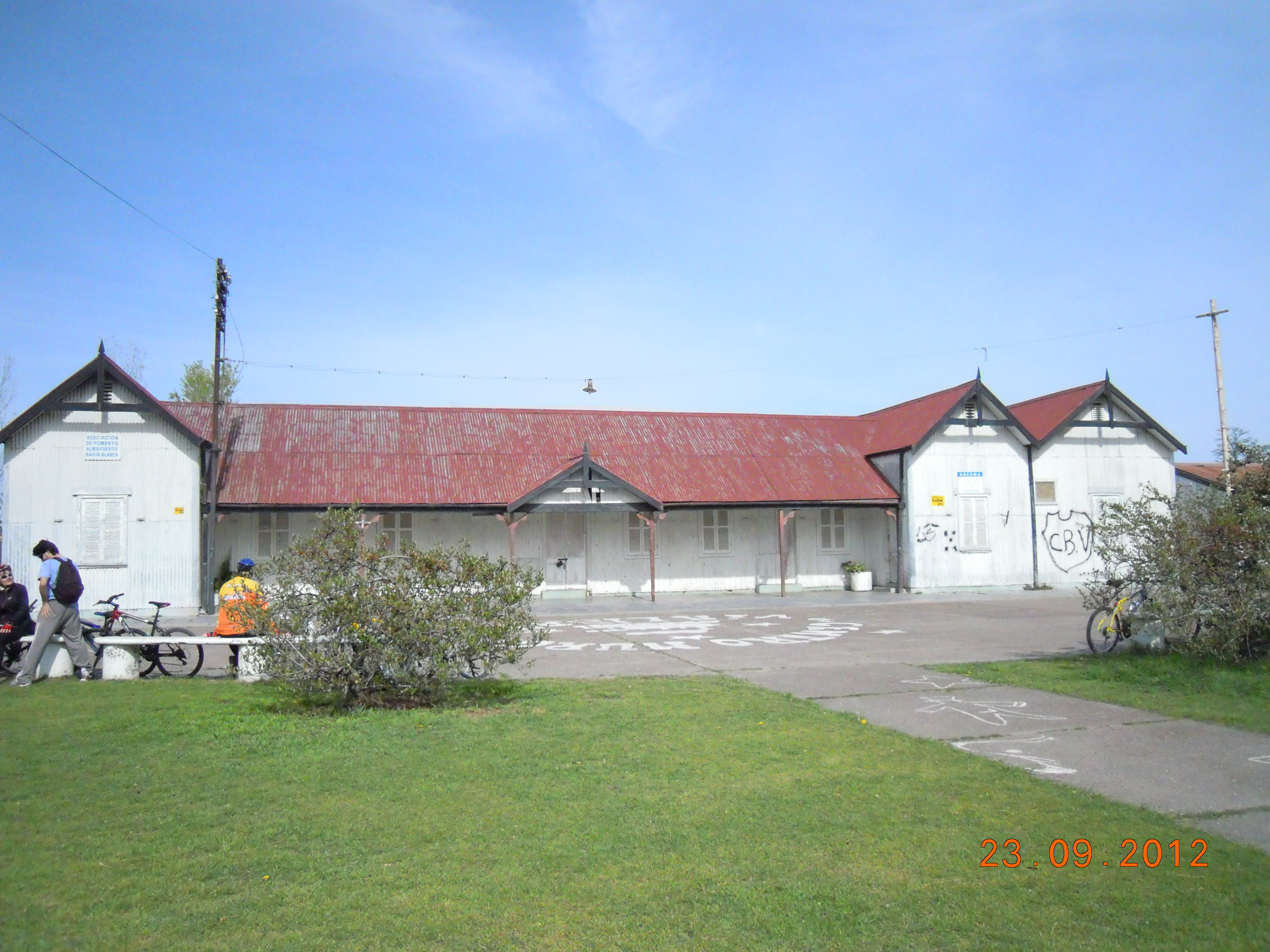
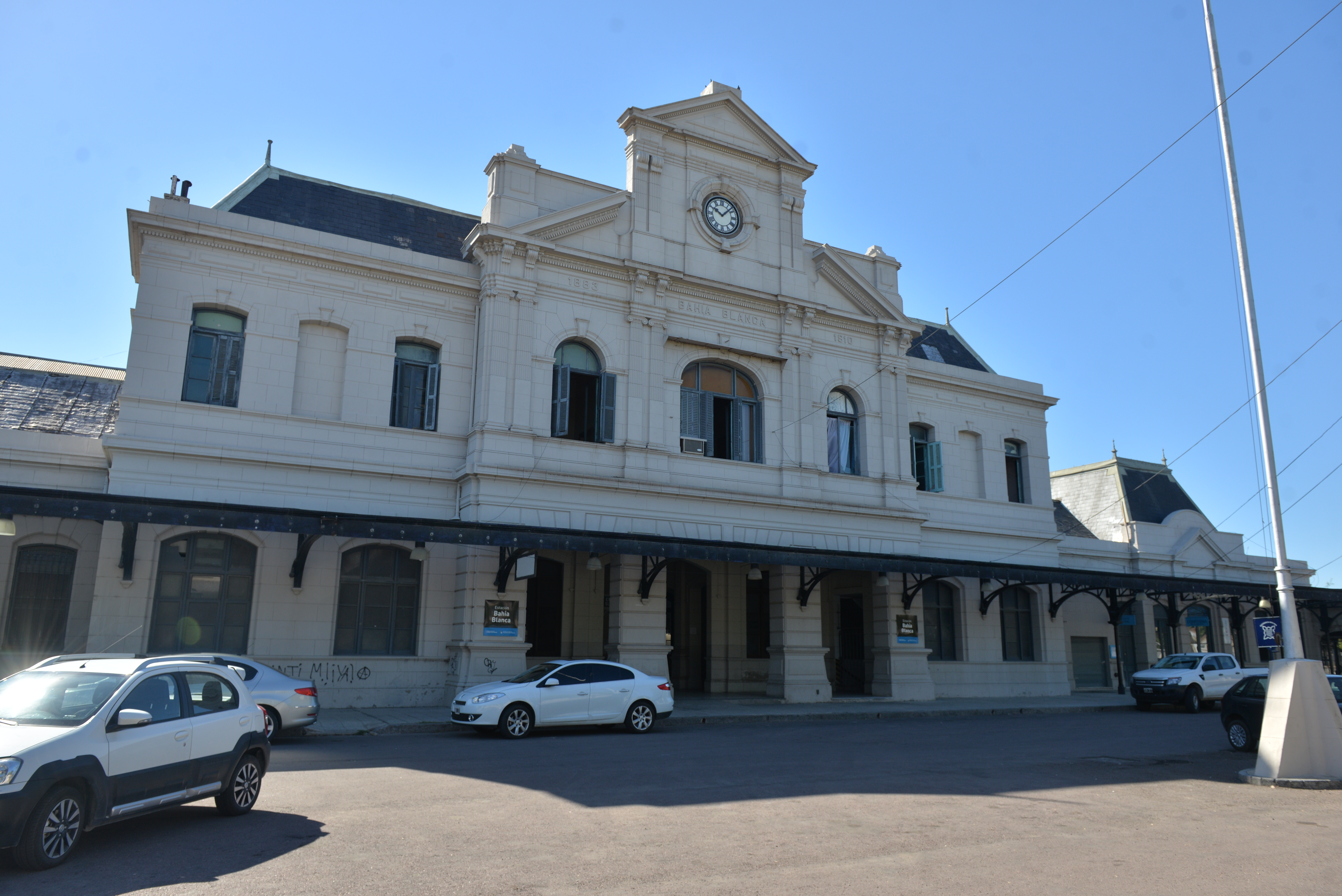
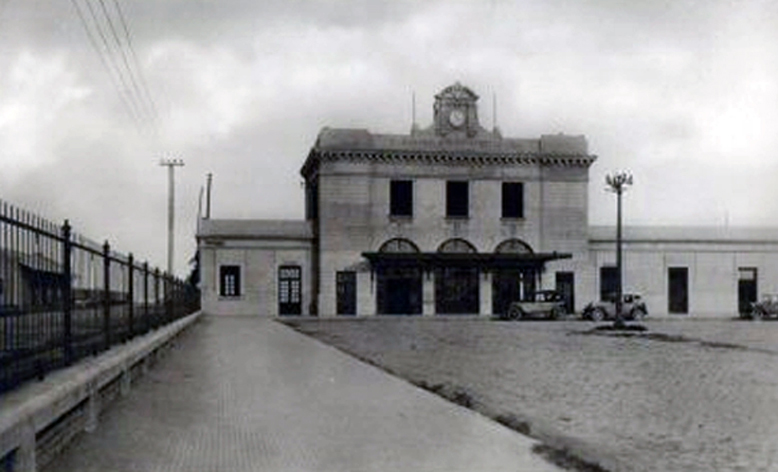
The three rail stations in Bahía Blanca, fltr: FCBNO, FC Sud, and FCRPB (pictured in 1930).

Bahía Blanca had a total of three railway stations, with no passenger services as of January 2024. The last active station was Bahía Blanca Sud, originally built by British BA Great Southern company and opened in 1884, and terminus of General Roca Railway covering the 680 km (420 mi) distance between Constitución and Bahía Blanca. Services to Bahía Blanca were interrupted by state-owned Trenes Argentinos in October 2022 after a derailment in Olavarría.

The other two stations of the city were built and originally operated by British Bahía Blanca and North Western Railway (opened in 1891) and French Rosario and Puerto Belgrano Railway (opened in 1912) respectively. After its closure in 1962, the FCRPB station then served as the municipal library until it was destroyed by fire in 2022 and later demolished.

Name	Former company	Ceased oper.	Status
Bahía Blanca Sud	BA Great Southern	2022	Closed
Bahía Blanca	Rosario & Pto. Belgrano	1949	Closed
Bahía Blanca	BB & North Western	1962	Destroyed

== Architecture ==
The city has the common features of those founded by the Spanish and their descendants: a main square at the centre surrounded by relevant buildings the likes of The City Hall and the Church (located on opposite although facing sides of the main square). Buildings of administrative importance also surround the main square or are located nearby. The planning which took place before its foundation and during its early development conceived streets parallel to the sides of the main square. Almost all the blocks are then rectangular in shape. As the city developed the streets were extended and more rectangular blocks were added at the edges. The Administration of the City decided then to observe a plan of development probably about 1960, when it might have been ruled that further developments would follow established criteria according to their purpose: permanent dwellers, public places, industries. Most of the city has terraced houses although detached houses surrounded by extensive gardens are well developed in some areas such as barrio Palihue, with an adjacent golf course at Club de Golf Palihue. Barrio Patagonia and country clubs for permanent and also for week-end dwellers were designed and developed at the outskirts of the city.

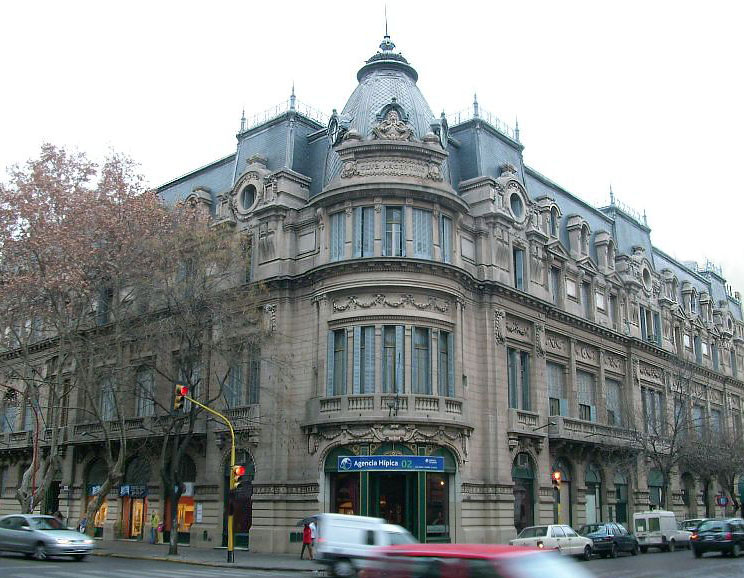
Club Argentino

The architecture of Bahía Blanca is notable as well. Public buildings such as the seat of the Banco de la Nación, Bolsa de Comercio de Bahía Blanca (Chamber of Commerce, the stock exchange), the main Post Office, the former building of the local newspaper La Nueva Provincia, the City Hall, the Rectorate and academic departments of Universidad del Sur, its 'Casa de la Cultura', Teatro Municipal (Opera House of the city), Biblioteca Rivadavia and Club Argentino, amongst others, are well-considered pieces of architecture, most of them extremely well preserved. Some of them are of French neoclassical influence (L'École des Beaux Arts, Paris).

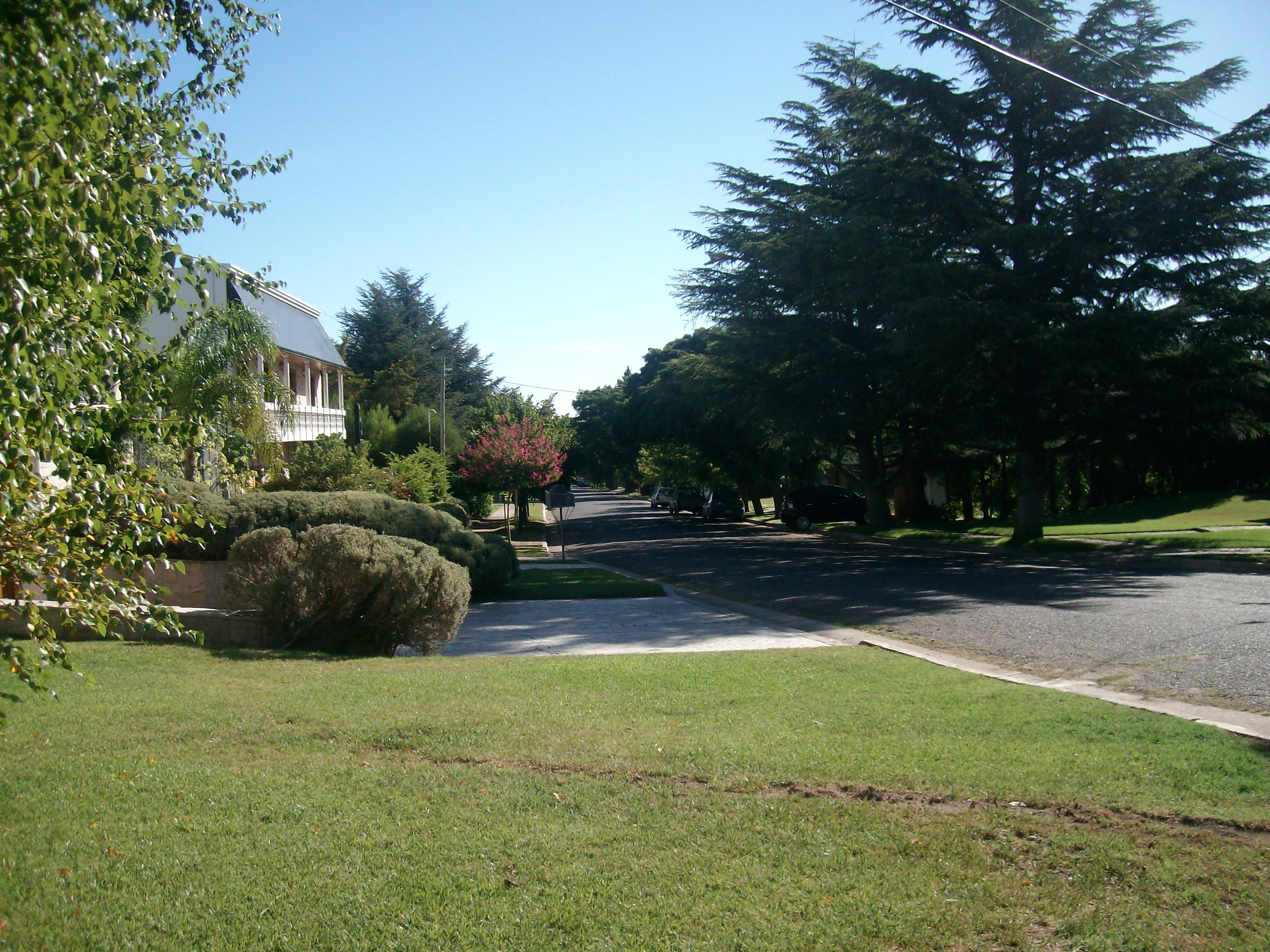
Suburban Bahía Blanca

There are monuments and pieces of sculpture scattered all along the city: in the streets, main buildings and green spaces such as Caronti's bust, facing the City Hall, the Memorial to Bernardino Rivadavia, at the centre of the main square, Fuente de los Ingleses and Memorial of the Israeli community, in the same square. The statue of José de San Martín, in Parque de Mayo, the sculpture group of Lola Mora in the fountain at the front of Universidad del Sur, the memorial to Giuseppe Garibaldi, the statue of Isabel I of Castile in front of the bus station, donated by the Government of Spain (no such pieces are donated to non capital cities as it has been this case, enhancing the importance of the local Spanish descendants), the pieces which decorate the frontispieces of Banco de la Nación, Edificio Banco Provincia, to the side of the City Hall, Saint George and the Dragon of the former electrical power plant of Ingeniero White in the Port, the ones of the former building of La Nueva Provincia and those of the cathedral are unique, as well as the modern art ones which form the group of Paseo de las Esculturas, indeed remarkable. Although not a sculpture, the mural mosaic of Colegio Don Bosco, on the corner of Vieytes and Moreno streets, by Aurelio Friedrich -a local plastic artist- is to be mentioned. All of them do enrich the architectural, artistic and cultural patrimony and heritage of the city. Multiple green spaces have been created in the city: Plaza Rivadavia (its main square), Parque de Mayo, Paseo de las Esculturas, Parque Independencia, Plaza 9 de Julio, and Plaza Villa Mitre, are the most familiar ones.

Besides the usual areas included when the city is to be shown to somebody who is unfamiliar with it, other areas of interest include the Barrio Inglés ('English Quarter') where the British foremen and technicians who built the railways and ports lived, and Villa Harding Green, a suburb where the railway and port managers dwelled.

== Culture and education ==
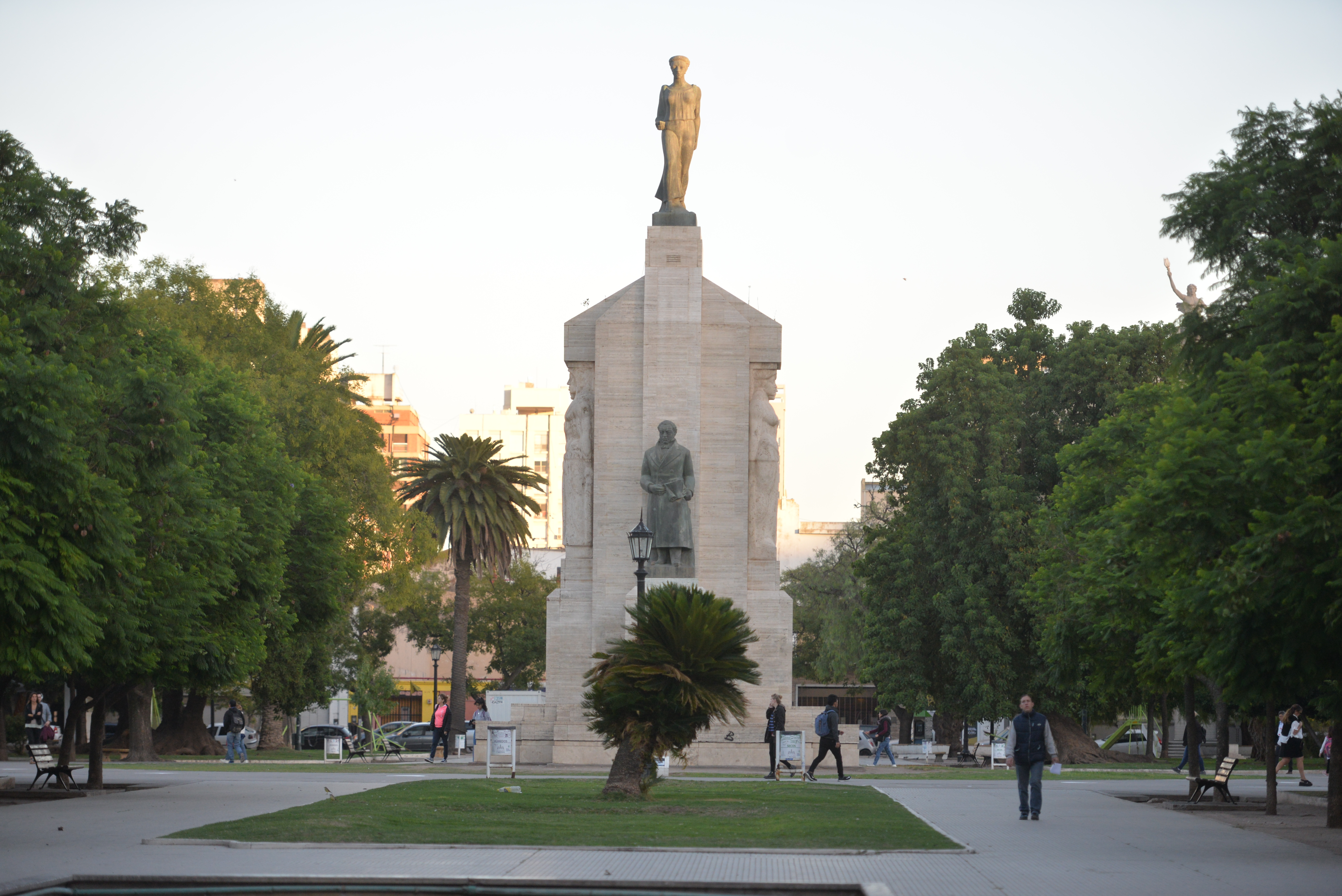
Rivadavia Square in Bahía Blanca.

The city is a developed one including cultural and educational aspects. It has a permanent Symphony Orchestra and a Company of Classical Ballet (Ballet del Sur) with an associate School of Classic Dances. For further education there are two tertiary institutes and two national universities. The first ones are Instituto Superior Juan XXIII, (probably linked to the future UNISAL (standing for Universidad Salesiana) of the Salesians) and Instituto Avanza (tertiary institute of humanities). National Universities are Facultad Regional Bahía Blanca Universidad Tecnológica Nacional, devoted mainly to exact sciences and intended for students who do have a job for making a living, with formal activities in the evening; and the Universidad Nacional del Sur (National University of the South), founded in January 1956. This last one has associated internationally known institutes of research in biological, biochemical and technological sciences such as INIBIB and Instituto de Oceanografia, among others. Both national universities are free of tuition fees for all students. Nobel laureate César Milstein was born and raised in Bahía Blanca.

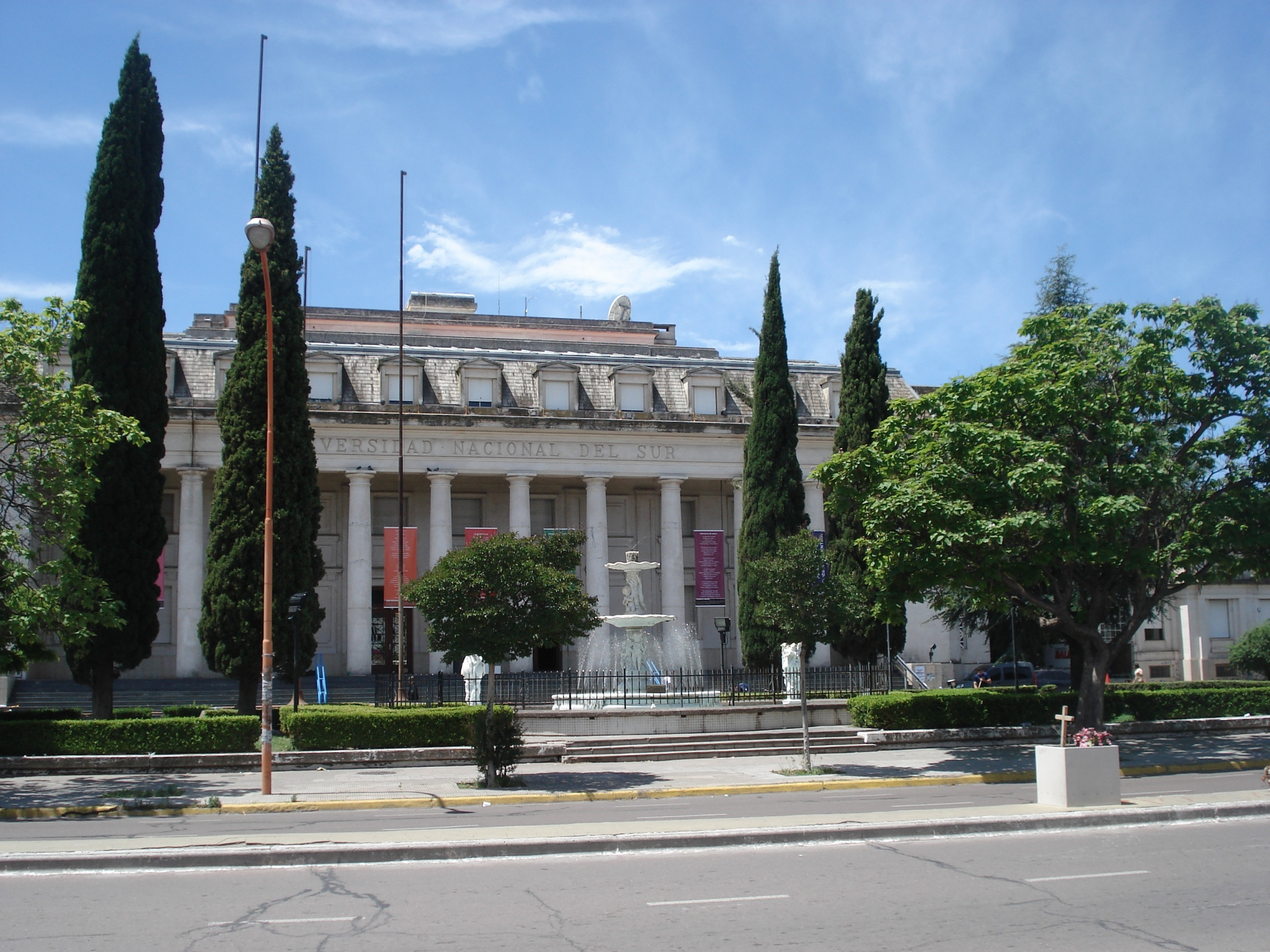
Universidad Nacional del Sur

Initial and basic education depend on the province of Buenos Aires although there is a locally elected Municipal Educational Counselor holding some degree of influence and supervision on both. The system was transformed about ten years ago through the Secretary of Education. What used to be a system with primary (mandatory) and secondary (non-mandatory) education before continuing university studies (the 'French model') became Basic General Education (mandatory) and Polimodal Education (the 'Spanish-Catalan model') although nowadays it is being reviewed and likely to be modified again. Free education is granted by the state although there are semi-private and private schools.

There are reputed provincial Schools of Plastic Arts and Music, free of tuition fees. Foreign languages are taught at public schools at a rather basic level. However, there are local foreign language schools such as the Asociación Bahiense de Cultura Inglesa (English, also taught by many other institutions), the Alliance Française (French), the Dante Alighieri Society (Italian) and Goethe-Institut (German), all of them private although with a good number of students. Portuguese is also taught. There used to be a school of Basque language at "Unión Vasca" also named "Euzkadi" with a much smaller group of students.

=== Libraries ===
The main public library, Biblioteca Bernardino Rivadavia, is one of the oldest in the area, possessing a curated collection of around 160,000 books, newspapers, and magazines. In addition, the library of Universidad Nacional del Sur and several smaller council-supported libraries are open to the public.

=== Museums ===
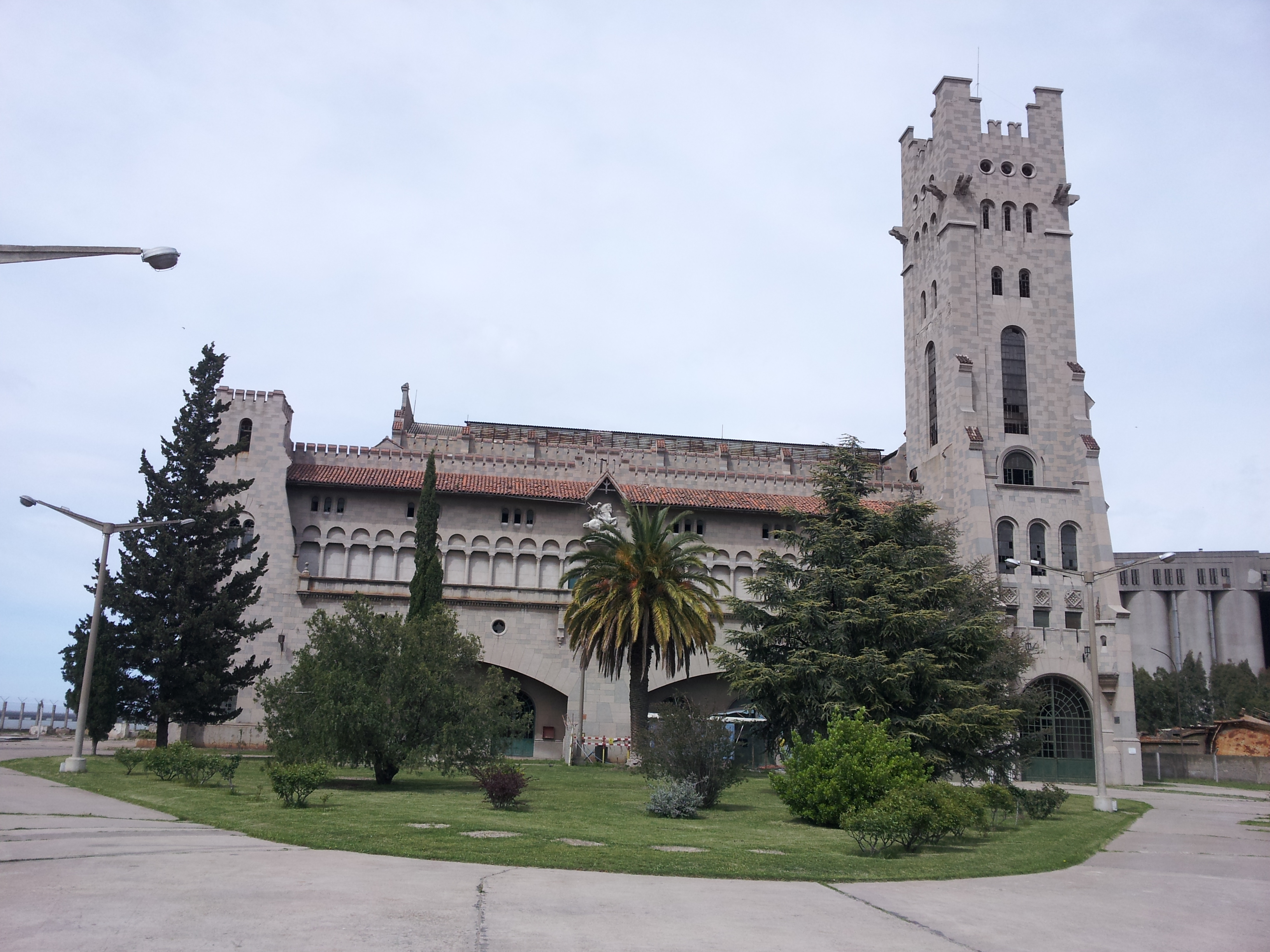
Ferrowhite Museum

There are several museums in the city which include the Port Museum, the History Museum, the Fine Arts Museum and the Contemporary Arts Museum, these last two ones headed by Betiana Gerardi, where permanent and temporary exhibits take place. Pieces of art from reputed local and Argentine artists belonging to the City patrimony are shown. There are at least two known large oils on canvas by Benito Quinquela Martín, one there—at the Museum—and the other in the mayor's office. Other exhibits do regularly take place at Biblioteca Rivadavia, Chamber of Commerce, Casa de la Cultura and Alliance Française, where frequent vernissages are organized on the responsibility of different curators. There are at least two associations of local and regional plastic artists, Asociación de Bahiense de Artistas Plásticos and Asociacion de Artistas del Sur, both of them actively promoting workshops and exhibits throughout the year, also in charge of the organization of multiple cultural activities.

A military museum organised by the Army at its local "Comando del V Cuerpo de Ejército" (V Army Corps Command) at which a miniaturized recreation of the original Fortress is on display, made by César Puliafito, as well as a collection of ancient maps, documents and pieces alongside one of the most important -and rather unknown- libraries of history in the region: this one and that of the Salesians, at Inspectoría San Francisco Javier (Head of the Salesians of Don Bosco for the whole Patagonia) have fantastic collections with many priceless documents related to the conquest and "civilization" of Patagonia, almost completely carried out by the Army and the Salesians. The Army Museum of History of Bahía Blanca is open to the public with guided tours being available on appointment. All museums in the city have free admission.

=== Publications ===
There is one local and regional newspaper, La Nueva Provincia, as well as regularly published indexed scientific journals such as Revista Científica de la Asociación Médica de Bahía Blanca (Bahía Blanca Medical Association Scientific Journal) in Spanish with abstracts in both Spanish and English. EDIUNS, the publisher of Universidad Nacional del Sur, produces what Scientists, Professors and Lecturers edit facilitating them all the processes related to publishing including copyright procedures which is beneficial for both editors and readers. CREEBBA (the Regional Center for Economic Studies of Bahía Blanca, Argentina) publishes respected, independent reports regarding financial and economical aspects of the city and its area of influence. Written in Spanish, they also comment on national macroeconomic issues.

=== Shopping ===
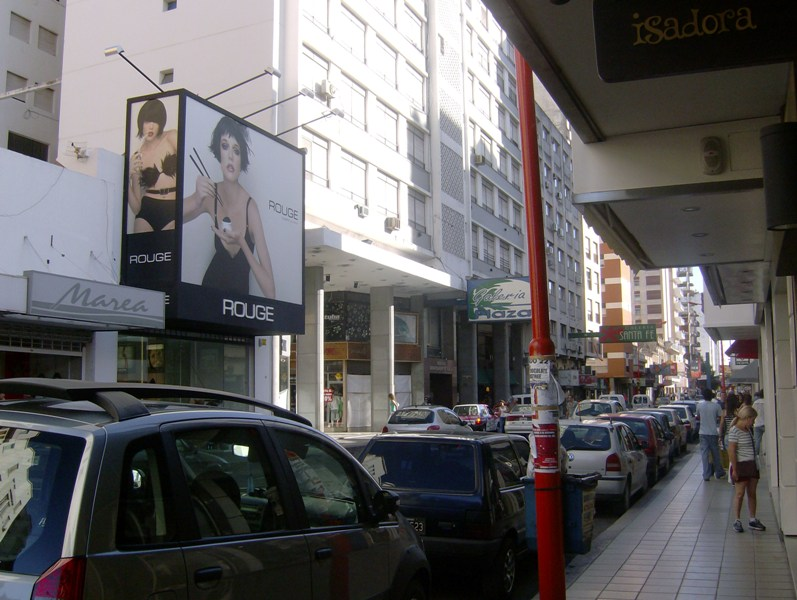
Alsina Street, now pedestrianized

The city has two shopping centres on the outskirts and many shops downtown that are quite active and offer a variety of high-end goods and products. On weekends, mainly on Saturday there is a craftsmanship fair in the street at Plaza Rivadavia, the main square, where all kinds of handmade goods are available. There is also a variety of megastores, some of them locally and regionally developed competing with branches of international companies. Most of them are open even on Sundays, although this is now under review and local unions have lobbied for businesses and shops to close on Sundays.

=== Entertainment ===
Cinemas, discos, a variety of restaurants and pubs are available, many of them overnight. Frequent pieces of theatre, ballet and concerts are offered.

Bahía Blanca has also two zoos: a municipal one, with a variety of species and permanent veterinarians and personnel looking after the animals, and a private one in the outskirts of the town. At the shores close to the city there are recreational places such as "Balneario Maldonado" and "Colón". The Estuary has been graded and listed as The Natural Reserve of Bahía Blanca, Bahía Falsa and Bahía Verde, including the Islands Zuraitas, Bermejo, Trinidad, Embudo, Wood and smaller ones accounting for an area of 300 square kilometres, by Provincial Law 12101 effective since 1998. Fishing for sharks is becoming an attraction for an increasing number of people, some of whom travel from across the country to do it, in specified areas of the estuary where it is permitted by boat or from small piers in the islands of the bay.

=== Religion ===
The vast majority of the inhabitants of the city are Roman Catholics although there are Protestant churches and a synagogue. There are also Muslims in the city, but no mosque. The city is religiously tolerant, a common nationwide characteristic guaranteed by the Argentine Constitution. The city is the seat of the Archdiocese of Bahía Blanca. Its mother church is a neoclassical cathedral (the Our Lady of Mercy Cathedral). The Archbishop since 2003 is Guillermo José Garlatti. The Archbishop presides the local branch of the relief and social assistance organization Caritas, which supports itself through the help of Catholic and non-Catholic individuals as well as non-governmental organizations.

== Sports ==
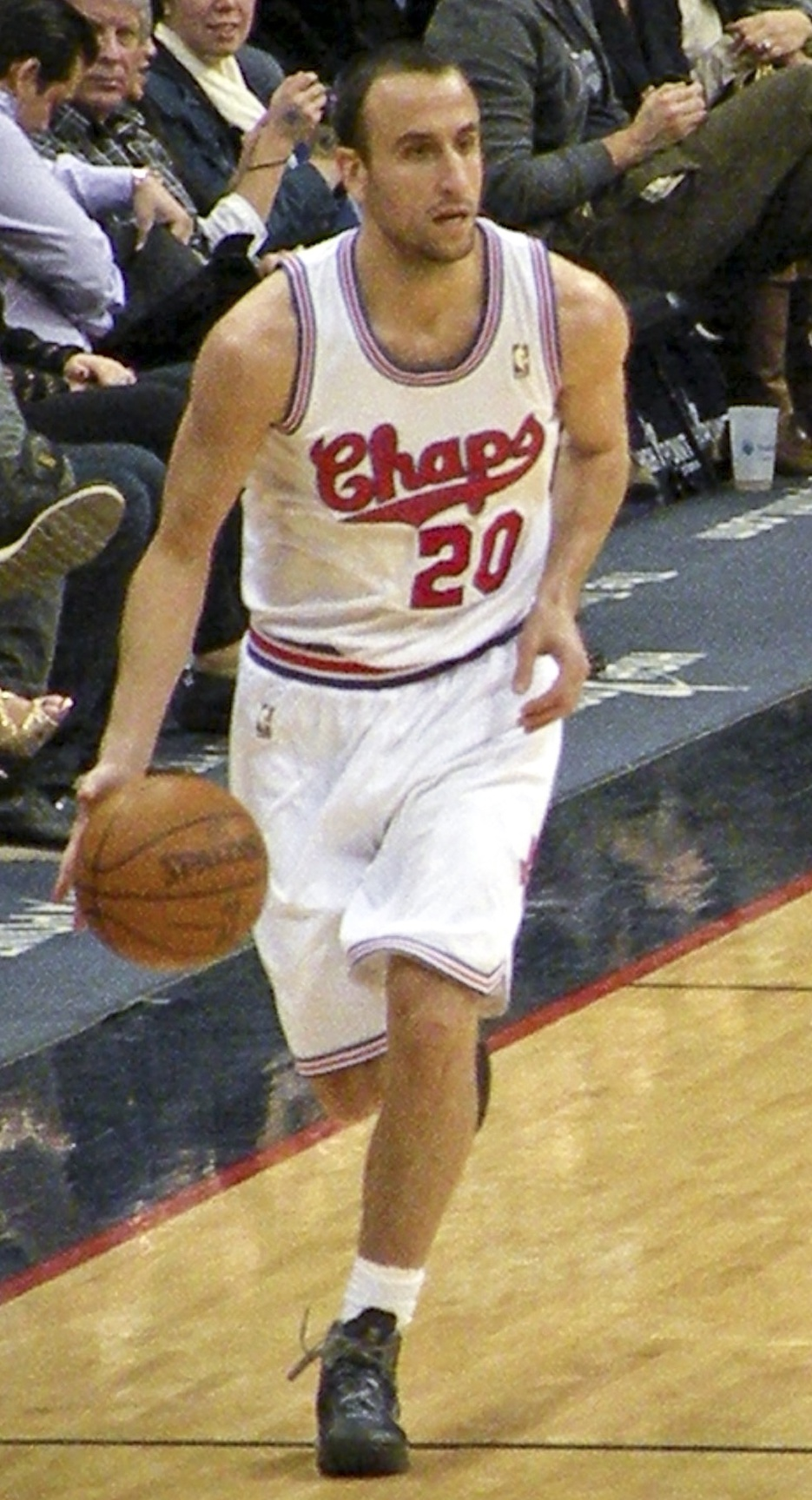
Four-time NBA champion Manu Ginóbili

Facilities for playing football, tennis, rugby, golf, indoor swimming, indoor and outdoor basketball and some other sports are easily available throughout the area. There are two large indoor basketball stadiums with about 3000 to 3500 seats each and three important football stadiums close to the city centre, the largest one with facilities for hosting about 15,000 people. There is one golf club with three courts of 9 holes each, driving range and putting green where courtesy for visiting players is observed. Two more golf courses are available in the area, one in a country club and the other in Puerto Belgrano.

Map of the nearby track, Autódromo Aldea Romana de Bahía Blanca with his old draw

Since the 1950s, Bahía has been considered the leading city of Argentine basketball. Internationally well-known players are Emanuel Ginóbili (NBA, San Antonio Spurs, Texas), Juan Ignacio Sánchez (also an NBA player who returned home in 2010 to found a professional local basketball team: Bahia Basket) and Alejandro Montecchia. They were gold medal winners in the Olympic Games Athens 2004, and members of the Argentine Team which played the final match FIBA World Championship in Indianapolis 2002 (2° place) and the FIBA World Championship in Japan 2006 where they came in fourth. Their coach at that event was Sergio Santos Hernández, also a native of Bahía Blanca. Former players Alberto Cabrera (deceased) and Atilio Fruet (retired) are also well remembered at national and local levels. The city's principal football (soccer) teams are Olimpo and Villa Mitre. Olimpo played in the Argentine first division until relegation in 2006, and was reinstated in 2010. Ex-Argentina national football team coach Alfio Basile and the football players Rodrigo Palacio, and current Argentina and Internazionale Milan forward Lautaro Martínez were born in Bahía Blanca.

Two of the best padel players in history hail from Bahía Blanca: Juan Mieres and Miguel Lamperti, both currently ranked in the top 10 in the world.

== Healthcare ==
The illiteracy rate of the city, as well as the neonatal and infant mortality rates, are amongst the lowest in the country. Besides the national censuses -which take place every ten years-, the Ministry of Economy carries out periodical regional censuses sampling urban areas collecting data on economic and social indexes, such as Encuesta Permanente de Hogares by INDEC. There are two principal hospitals in the city: a provincial one, Hospital Dr José Penna, and a municipal one, Hospital Municipal Dr Leónidas Lucero, both of them tertiary centres for assistance and referrals throughout the region. The health care system is free of charge to any legal resident of the Nation. Public Health is the responsibility of both the province of Buenos Aires and the city, which have a network of public clinics throughout the city and the region taking care of people as primary health carers. There are also private health care institutions. There is one physician for every 266 inhabitants. Public health is coordinated between the Minister of Health of the Buenos Aires Province, who has a Delegate in Bahía Blanca (Zona Sanitaria I), and the City Administration under the supervision of the local Secretary of Health appointed directly by the city mayor. Aspects of interest about the City and Council Administration can be found on its website in both Spanish and English.

== Climate ==
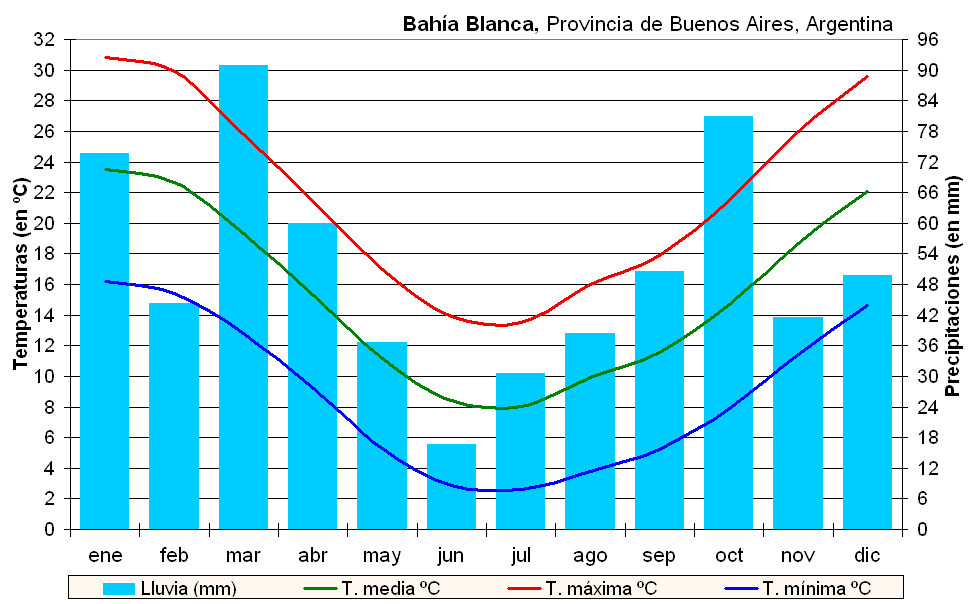
Annual variations for rainfall (blue columns), mean (green), highest(red) and lowest (blue) temperatures

Bahía Blanca's climate is subtropical and characterized by wide variations in temperatures. It is influenced by the location of the city by the ocean with warm superficial streams by the shores. Winters are characterized by cool temperatures during the day with cold nights. The mean temperature during winter is 8 °C (46.4 °F). Temperatures can fall below 0 °C (32.0 °F) although snowfalls are rare, averaging 0.2 days of snow per year. The last significant snowfall took place recently in July 2009. The one before was in May 2007, although it sometimes does snow in Sierra de la Ventana. On average, there are 35 days with frost, most of it occurring in June–August. Winters are characterized by cloudy and damp weather, averaging 9–11 overcast days.

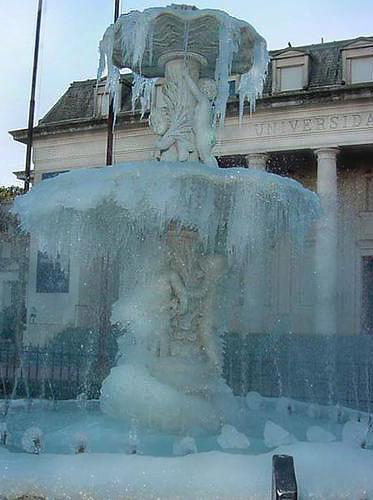
Lola Mora's fountain at the entrance of the Universidad Nacional del Sur

Spring and fall are characterized by mild temperatures during the day and cool to cold nights. Normally, the last frost occurs on 1 October while the first frost occurs on 9 May although frosts have been recorded as early as 16 March and as late as 8 November. Although the majority of frosts occurs in June–August, the occurrence of frosts in Spring and Fall can potentially damage crops.

Summers are hot during the day and night. Most of the precipitation is concentrated in the summer months, which can bring thunderstorms. Average temperatures during the summer is around 23 °C (73.4 °F). It tends to be sunnier, averaging 4–7 overcast days and 9–10 clear days.

Bahia Blanca receives 645.4 mm (25.41 in) of precipitation per year, most of it concentrated in the summer months and there are 79 days with measurable precipitation. However, precipitation is highly variable from year to year, with some years receiving over 1,000 mm (39 in) and other years where precipitation is less than 400 mm (16 in). The average relative humidity is 64%, with the winter months having higher humidity than the summer months. Winds are moderate throughout the year, with an average wind speed of 24.0 km/h (14.9 mph). Most of the winds either come from the north or from the northwest. Bahia Blanca receives an average of 2,310.7 hours of bright sunshine per year (about 6.3 hours of sunshine per day or 51% of possible sunshine), ranging from a high of 67% in January (9.7 hours of sunshine per day) to a low of 36% in July (3.6 hours of sunshine per day). The highest recorded temperature was 43.8 °C (110.8 °F) on 21 January 1980 while the lowest recorded temperature was −11.8 °C (10.8 °F) on 4 July 1988.

Climate data for Bahía Blanca airport (1991–2020, extremes 1860–present)
Month	Jan	Feb	Mar	Apr	May	Jun	Jul	Aug	Sep	Oct	Nov	Dec	Year
Record high °C (°F)	43.8 (110.8)	41.3 (106.3)	40.1 (104.2)	36.7 (98.1)	32.8 (91.0)	27.8 (82.0)	27.0 (80.6)	32.6 (90.7)	32.5 (90.5)	39.0 (102.2)	38.4 (101.1)	42.2 (108.0)	43.8 (110.8)
Mean daily maximum °C (°F)	31.2 (88.2)	29.6 (85.3)	27.0 (80.6)	22.0 (71.6)	17.7 (63.9)	14.5 (58.1)	13.9 (57.0)	16.5 (61.7)	18.9 (66.0)	22.1 (71.8)	26.0 (78.8)	29.7 (85.5)	22.4 (72.3)
Daily mean °C (°F)	23.6 (74.5)	22.1 (71.8)	19.6 (67.3)	15.1 (59.2)	11.4 (52.5)	8.4 (47.1)	7.6 (45.7)	9.6 (49.3)	11.8 (53.2)	15.0 (59.0)	18.7 (65.7)	22.0 (71.6)	15.4 (59.7)
Mean daily minimum °C (°F)	16.3 (61.3)	15.2 (59.4)	13.4 (56.1)	9.4 (48.9)	6.4 (43.5)	3.5 (38.3)	2.4 (36.3)	4.1 (39.4)	5.6 (42.1)	8.5 (47.3)	11.6 (52.9)	14.5 (58.1)	9.2 (48.6)
Record low °C (°F)	2.4 (36.3)	1.0 (33.8)	−1.5 (29.3)	−3.4 (25.9)	−6.4 (20.5)	−9.8 (14.4)	−11.8 (10.8)	−7.9 (17.8)	−7.3 (18.9)	−4.5 (23.9)	−1.5 (29.3)	0.5 (32.9)	−11.8 (10.8)
Average precipitation mm (inches)	66.2 (2.61)	69.4 (2.73)	70.6 (2.78)	53.2 (2.09)	41.5 (1.63)	32.6 (1.28)	32.4 (1.28)	31.7 (1.25)	45.0 (1.77)	69.5 (2.74)	62.3 (2.45)	64.7 (2.55)	639.1 (25.16)
Average precipitation days (≥ 0.1 mm)	6.9	6.5	7.4	6.8	5.6	6.0	5.5	4.9	6.2	8.8	7.2	6.6	78.4
Average snowy days	0.0	0.0	0.0	0.0	0.1	0.1	0.1	0.1	0.0	0.0	0.0	0.0	0.3
Average relative humidity (%)	53.0	59.4	65.3	69.9	75.2	73.4	72.3	67.0	65.2	64.9	58.1	52.0	64.6
Mean monthly sunshine hours	310.0	262.7	248.0	198.0	161.2	138.0	148.8	176.7	195.0	235.6	273.0	313.1	2,660.1
Mean daily sunshine hours	10.0	9.3	8.0	6.6	5.2	4.6	4.8	5.7	6.5	7.6	9.1	10.1	7.3
Percentage possible sunshine	67	66	52	57	40	38	36	44	44	49	58	58	51
Source 1: Servicio Meteorológico Nacional
Source 2: Meteo Climat (record highs and lows), Oficina de Riesgo Agropecuario (record lows), UNLP (percent sun only 1971–1980)

== Consulates ==
The city is the seat of several foreign consulates including the Spanish, Italian and Chilean. There are also Honorary Consulates of France, Denmark, Norway and the Netherlands.

== Notable residents ==
- Alfio Basile (born 1943) World Club champion with Racing Club and former Argentinian Football Coach
- Daniel Bertoni (1955), footballer and 1978 FIFA World Cup champion.
- Cecilia Bouzat (born 1961), biochemist, and listed as one of 100 Women (BBC)
- Italo Jose Dejter (born 1939), mathematician and a retired professor of computer science
- Claudio Graf (born 1976), football striker and coach
- Manu Ginóbili (born 1977), Basketball Hall of Fame member, former NBA player and 2004 Olympic Gold medalist
- Violet Jessop (1887–1971) Irish-Argentine ocean liner stewardess, volunteer nurse, and survivor of the Titanic and Britannic sinkings. She was also onboard the Olympic when it collided with HMS Hawke.
- Nicolás Katz (born 1998), footballer who plays as a forward
- Héctor Libertella (1945–2006), writer
- Lautaro Martínez (born 1997), footballer and 2022 FIFA World Cup champion
- César Milstein (1927–2002), Nobel Prize in Physiology or Medicine
- Helena Montalban (1946–1991), telenovela actress
- Micaela Ortega (2003–2016) murder victim
- Rodrigo Palacio (born 1982), footballer who plays as a forward
- Carlos di Sarli (1903–1960) was an Argentine tango musician, orchestra leader, composer and pianist
- Ezequiel Skverer (born 1989), Israeli-Argentinian basketball player

== See also ==
- List of twin towns and sister cities in Argentina
- Isla Bermejo

== Books ==
- Fittkau, E.; Illies, J.; Klinge, H.; Schwabe, G. (1969). Biogeography and Ecology in South America. Springer. ISBN 9789401197311.
