= Dalmanerea =

Argentine rock band

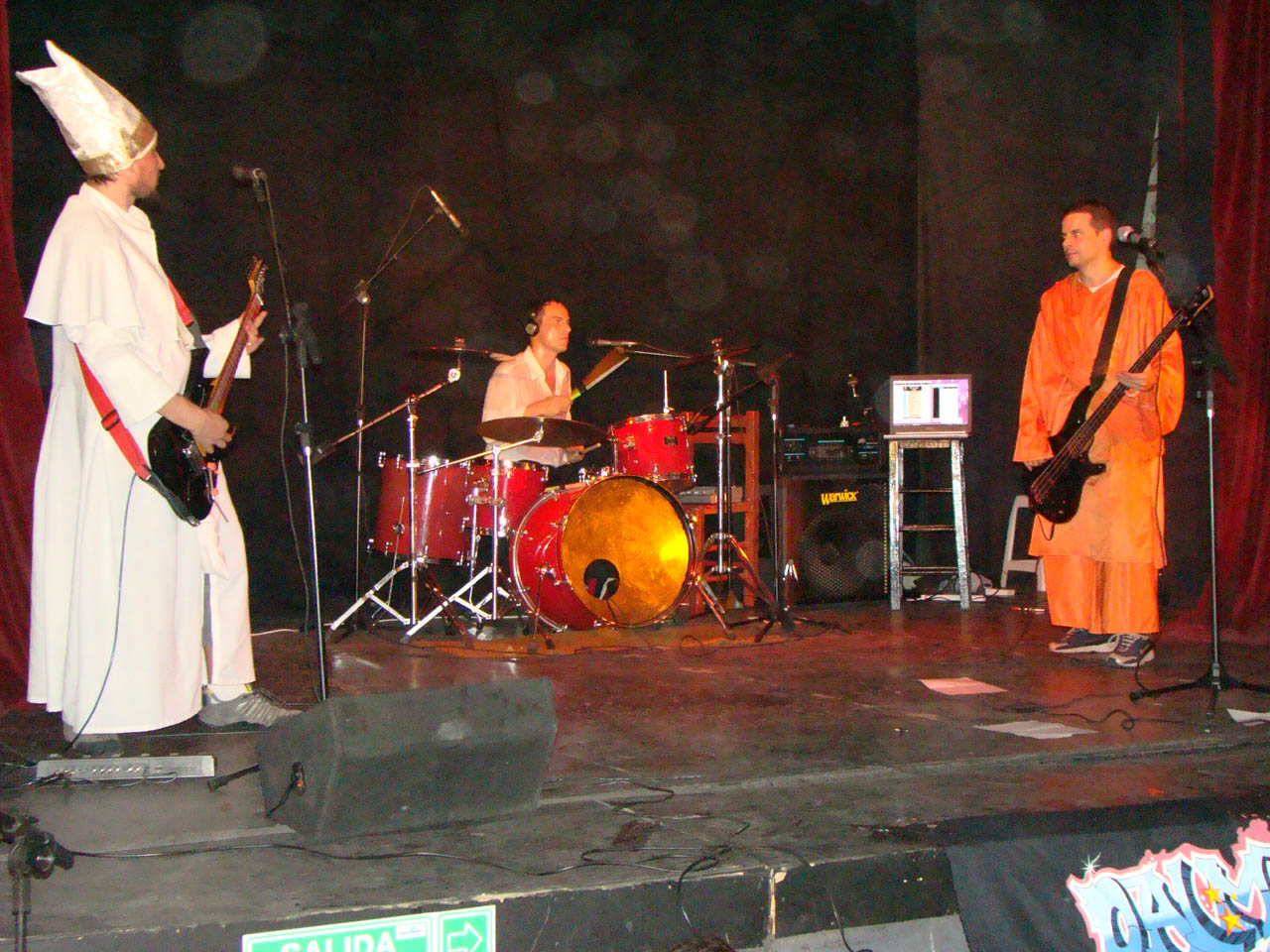

Background information
- Origin: Buenos Aires, Argentina
- Genres: Psychedelic rock, pop rock, alternative rock, electronic rock
- Years active: 2000 – present
- Labels: Sony Music, Bultaco Records, Pop Art Music, meZKla Records
- Members: Guzza-2K; Lex-Loro; Betolón; Varmando; DJ-RickYMendó; Petrungaro-1
- Past members: Tony_GL, Rode-T, Cyvorg, Luk-As, AndreYta, Pol-ET
- Website: dalmanerea.com

Dalmanerea is an Argentine rock band formed in the early 2000s by former members of the Olavarría band "Disculpen al Nono" who at that time were spread among Buenos Aires, Tandil and Olavarría.

Dalma's music mixed various styles (rock, electronic, pop, alternative, punk, techno, rap, disco, metal, and others) in what has been named "meZKla argentina".

Dalmanerea has released six self-produced albums, several singles, and has taken part in some collective albums alongside others indie bands. Dalma has also toured extensively throughout the country's alternative circuits. Additionally, the band has published a mystique-of-the-band comic (Dalmaworld), initiated by Cyvorg and continued by Leee-O.

The current version (8.1) is formed by Lex-Loro on lead guitar (and legal advisor), Betolon playing drums, bassist Guzza2K, DJ-RickYMendó (deejaying), Petrungaro-I (voice and percussion), MAX-Canter (rhythm guitar and band's magician), the singer and extreme-dancer Varmando, and DalmaIA (artificial intelligence, supporting sound design, graphics and video). Song-writing is shared by all members, and lyrics are inspired by Varmando's dreams, enriched by the input of all members, both past and present.

Past versions were v1.0 (Guitar: Cyvorg + Drums/bass: Betolon + Bass/Drums/Voice: Varmando), v1.5 (1.0 + Guitar: Tony_GL), v2.0 (Guitar: Tony_GL + Drums/Bass: Betolon + Bass/Drum: Varmando), v2.5 (2.0 + Bass: Rode-T), v3.0 (Bass: iVannette + Guitar: Tony_GL + Drums: Betolon + Voice: Varmando), v3.5 (3.0 + Guitar: Lex-Loro), v4.0 (3.5 - Tony_GL + 2nd Guitar: Luk-As), v4.5 (4.0 + 2nd Voice: AndreYta + Trumpet/Choirs: Pole-T), v4.6 (4.5 - Lex-Loro + 2nd Guitar: Pole-T), v5.0 (Guitar/Chorus: Luk-As, 2nd Guitar/2nd Voice: Pole-T, Drums: Betolon, Bass: iVannette), v5.1 (v5.0 - Luk-As + Guitar: Dr-Satan), 6.0 (Lex, Petrun, Betolon, Guzza and Varmando), 7.0 (the missing link), 7.5 (v6.0 + DJ-RickYMendó), and 8.0 (v7.5 + MAX-Canter)

== Discography ==
"#pornopop", 2022, m3ZKla records, OneRPM, Long Play Salas, Estudio Kimono, Ovie Mastering

"Bomba!", 2019, m3ZKla records, El Cirko Sello Digital, Estudio Kimono, Ovie Mastering

"Divan de Historias", 2018, m3ZKla records, El Cirko Sello Digital, Gatonegro Studio

"Falta de Medicamentos", 2016, m3ZKla Records, El Cirko Sello Digital, Gatonegro Studio

"Mundo Guz-Kar", 2008, m3ZKla Records, Studiorec

"Dalmademox", 2006, m3ZKla Records, Cyvorgstudio

El Colectivo III, 2004, Discos Colectivo

El Colectivo II, 2003, Discos Colectivo

== Interviews ==
- Luz, Cámara, Rock - Cultura Infernal TV - 2021
- ¿Cuál es tu Rock? - Radio Tú - 2018
- Rock en Las venas - FM Open 99.3 - 2010
- Mutantes en la Noche - FM La Tribu 88.7 - 2009
- 26 Noticias - TV and Web - 2007
- El Popular newspaper - 2005
