= Olavarría Partido =

Coordinates: 35°42′S 63°00′W

Olavarría Partido de Olavarría
- Department
- Coat of arms

- location of Partido de Olavarría in Buenos Aires Province
- Country: Argentina
- Established: November 25, 1867
- Founder: Coronel Álvaro Barros, ley provincial
- Seat: Olavarría

Government
  - Intendant: Maximiliano Wesner (PJ-UP)

Area
  - Total: 7,715 km^{2} (2,979 sq mi)

Population
  - Total: 111,708
  - Density: 14.48/km^{2} (37.50/sq mi)
- Demonym: olavarriense
- Postal Code: B7400
- IFAM: BUE090
- Area Code: 02284
- Patron saint: San José
- Website: www.olavarria.gov.ar

Olavarría Partido is a partido in the central region of Buenos Aires Province in Argentina.

The provincial subdivision has a population of about 104,000 inhabitants in an area of 7,715 km^{2} (2,979 sq mi), and its capital city is Olavarría, which is around 350 km (220 mi) from Buenos Aires.

== Settlements ==
- Olavarría
- Blanca Grande
- Cerro Sotuyo
- Colonia Hinojo
- Colonia Nieves
- Durañona
- Espigas
- Hinojo
- Iturregui
- La Providencia
- Loma Negra
- Mapis
- Muñoz
- Colonia Las Carmelitas
- Pourtalé
- Recalde
- Rocha
- Colonia San Miguel
- Santa Luisa
- Sierra Chica
- Sierras Bayas
- Villa Alfredo Fortabat
