= Colonia Hinojo =

- Town
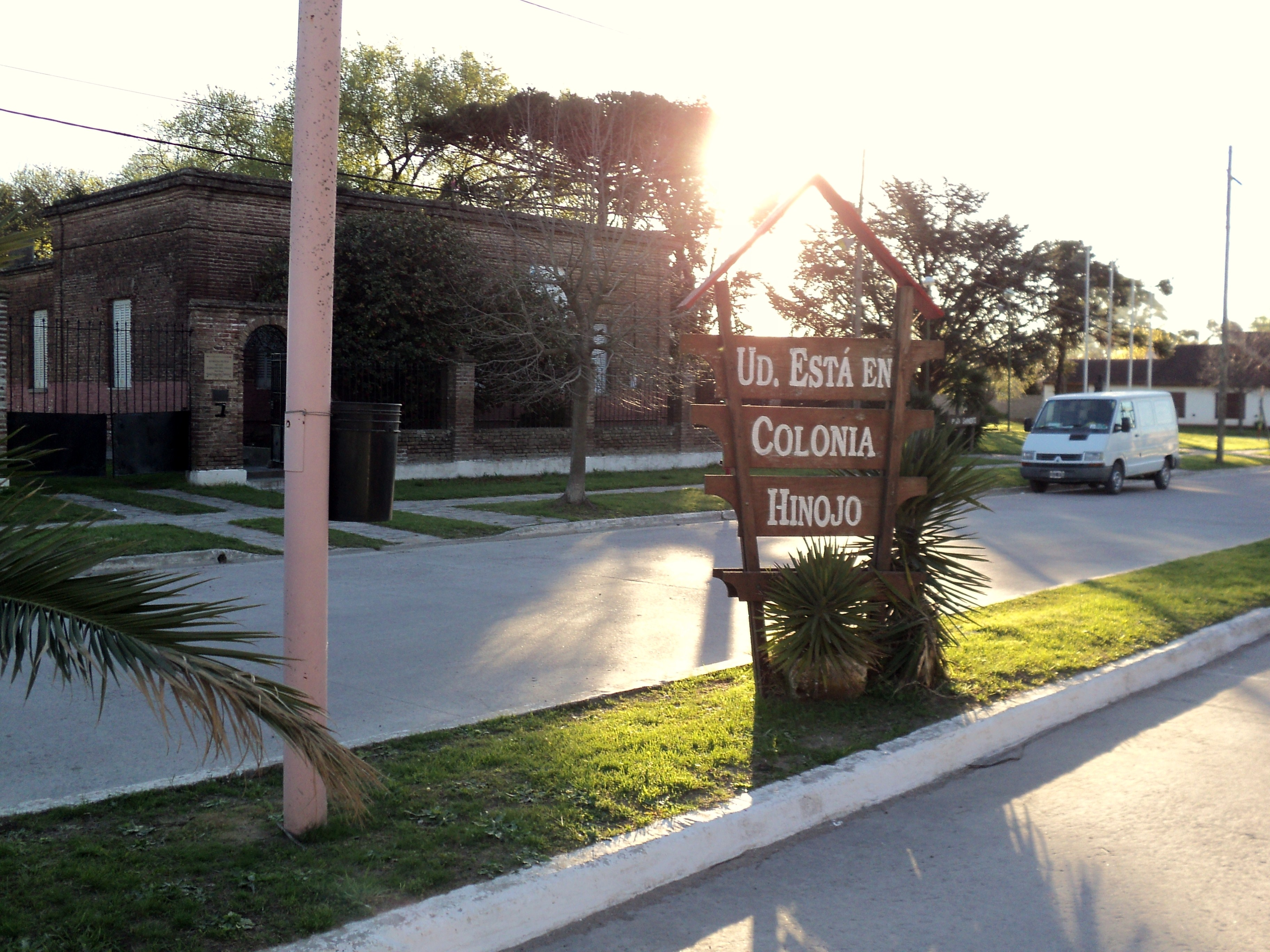

- Location within Buenos Aires Province
- Coordinates: 36°52′44″S 60°10′37″W
- Country: Argentina
- Province: Buenos Aires
- Partidos: Olavarría
- Established: 1878
- Elevation: 156 m (512 ft)

Population (2001 Census)
  - Total: 963
- Time zone: UTC−3 (ART)
- CPA Base: B 7318
- Area code: +291 457-XXXX
- Climate: Dfc

Colonia Hinojo is a town located in the Olavarría Partido in the province of Buenos Aires, Argentina.

== Name ==
The town's name, "Hinojo", comes from a number of plants grown in the region around the town. Hinojo is also sometimes called "Kamenka" or "Kaminka", in reference to the Russian town where the majority of the town's first settlers originated from.

== History ==
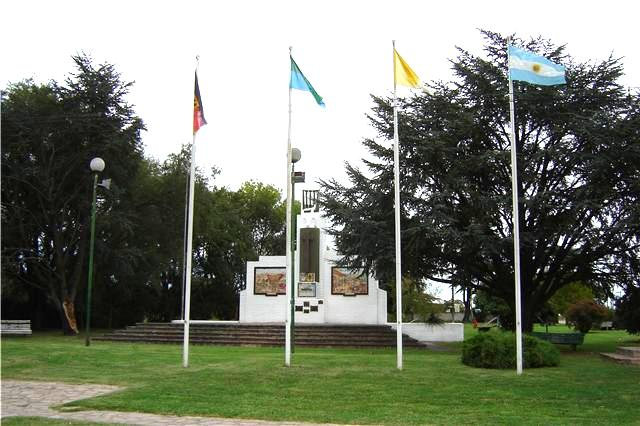
Monument to Volga German settlers in the town.

Colonia Hinojo was founded in 1878 by a group of Volga Germans, who originated from what is now Russia, becoming the first community in Argentina to be founded by that group. The original settlers came from the town of Kamenka, in modern-day Saratov Oblast, Russia. Rail service to the town began in 1883.

== Population ==
According to INDEC, which collects population data for the country, the town had a population of 963 people as of the 2001 census.

== Culture ==
As a result of the town's demographics and history, most buildings in Hinojo are of German design. The town is a center for German cuisine, and multiple German-themed festivals are held in the town.
