= Nicolás Katz =

Argentine footballer

Personal information
- Full name: Nicolás Julián Katz
- Date of birth: 13 January 1998 (age 28)
- Place of birth: Bahía Blanca, Argentina
- Height: 1.92 m (6 ft 4 in)
- Position: Forward

Team information
- Current team: Olimpo

Youth career
- Bella Vista
- Olimpo
- Estudiantes
- Olimpo

Senior career*
Years	Team	Apps	(Gls)
2018–	Olimpo	8	(0)
- * Club domestic league appearances and goals as of 12:35, 5 March 2019 (UTC)

Nicolás Julián Katz (born 13 January 1998) is an Argentine professional footballer who plays as a forward for Olimpo.

== Club career ==
Bella Vista were Katz's first youth team, preceding future stints with Olimpo and Estudiantes. After a spell with the latter, he rejoined Olimpo who would later give him his start in senior football. Having been on the substitutes bench twice as the club were relegated from the 2017–18 Primera División, Katz made his professional bow in the following campaign during a Copa Argentina tie with Gimnasia y Esgrima on 29 July 2018. His first appearance in league football arrived in Olimpo's Primera B Nacional opener against Sarmiento.

== International career ==
In 2014, Katz received a call-up to train with the Argentina U17s.

== Career statistics ==
As of 5 March 2019.

Appearances and goals by club, season and competition
Club	Season	League			Cup		Continental		Other		Total	
Club	Season	Division	Apps	Goals	Apps	Goals	Apps	Goals	Apps	Goals	Apps	Goals
Olimpo	2017–18	Primera División	0	0	0	0	—		0	0	0	0
Olimpo	2018–19	Primera B Nacional	8	0	1	0	—		0	0	9	0
Career total			8	0	1	0	—		0	0	9	0
