= 2025 Bahía Blanca floods =

Series of flash floods in Argentina

2025 Bahia Blanca floods
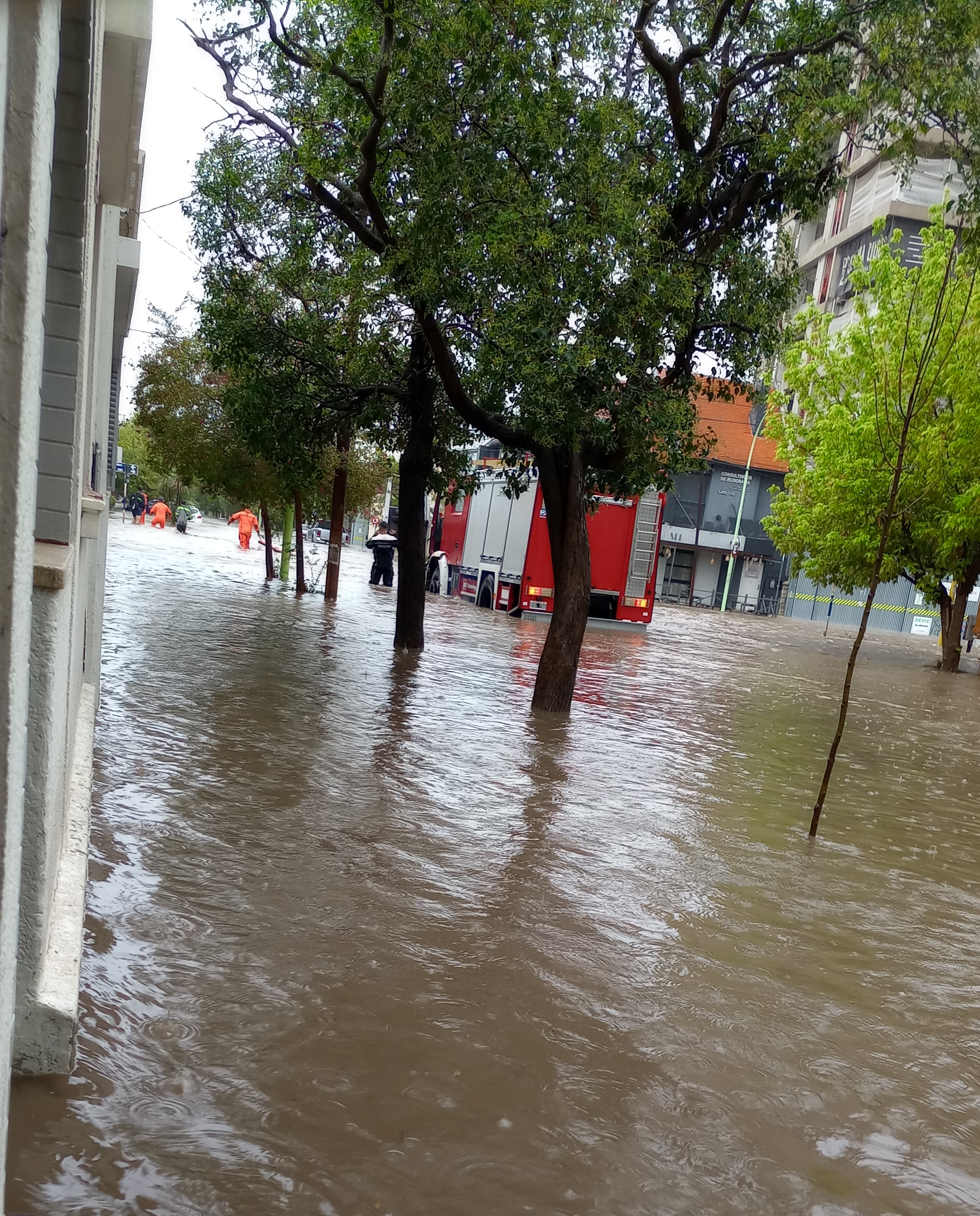
- The flooded city on 7 March
- Date: 7 to 9 March 2025
- Location: Bahía Blanca, Province of Buenos Aires, Argentina
- Cause: Flash floods
- Deaths: 17 (as of 17 March 2025)
- Missing: 1 (as of 14 March 2025)

On 7 March 2025, Bahía Blanca and neighboring cities, in the Province of Buenos Aires, Argentina, were flooded in the aftermath of unusually intense rainfall. The disaster caused serious material damage, thousands of evacuations, at least 17 deaths, and over 200 disappearances.

== Overview ==
During the first week of March 2025, a series of intense storms began to develop in the southeastern region of the province of Buenos Aires. The National Meteorological Service had issued alerts for intense rainfall, but the magnitude of the event exceeded forecasts. In just a few hours, the city of Bahía Blanca received an estimated precipitation of 290 millimetres (11 in), being the most devastating rainfall in Argentina since 1975 and over half of the average annual precipitation in the city of 584 millimetres (23.0 in).

17 deaths have been reported as a result of the flooding, as well as at least 222 disappearances. Of that number of missing people, only three were not found by 12 March. As of 6 April, only one girl, Delfina Hecker, remains missing. Her sister, Pilar Hecker, was found dead on Port Belgrano Naval Base.

== Meteorological conditions ==
Note that from 4:11 AM until 10:29 AM, the colors are not visible, this is due to the extreme intensity of the rain, which obscures the radar scan.

For several days before the event, a very humid and hot air mass from the Amazon dominated the center and north of the country. Instability levels remained high, and various disturbances swept through the area, causing severe weather.

On March 7, 2025, thunderstorms began to develop in the early hours of the morning in central La Pampa Province, rapidly evolving into strong storms. As the hours passed, these storms continued to intensify, forming a line of instability.

Around 3 AM, the line of instability began to slowly advance eastward-southeastward, entering Buenos Aires Province. Minutes before reaching the town of Bahía Blanca, the line of storms slowed its advance and continued to intensify, thus becoming a cloudburst.

This storm system remained practically static over Bahía Blanca (and surrounding towns) around 4 AM, and for several hours, it continuously regenerated and intensified, leaving significant precipitation and thunderstorms. It wasn't until around 10 AM that this storm system managed to continue moving, now in an east-northeast direction.

The video shows radar images. Green indicates light rain, yellow indicates moderate rain and thunderstorms, and red, fuchsia, and white indicates very heavy rain, hail, and strong or severe thunderstorms. The orange lines forming polygons are the successive short-term advisories issued by the National Meteorological Service, warning of the danger of the event.

== Reactions ==
=== Domestic ===
The disaster prompted a national humanitarian effort; non-perishable food, hygiene elements, and cleaning supplies have been donated from across Argentina.

President Javier Milei did not visit Bahía Blanca in the immediate aftermath of the flooding, which was harshly criticized by various opposition figures, including former president Cristina Fernández de Kirchner. Milei eventually made an unannounced trip to the city on 12 March, later explaining that his delayed reaction was to avoid distracting from relief efforts.

=== International ===
- Italy: Prime Minister Giorgia Meloni expressed her "deepest condolences to the victims of the floods that hit several cities in Argentina" on her X account. The Italian government renews its support for the Argentine authorities committed to the relief and assistance efforts for the affected population".
- Israel: In a tweet, Prime Minister Benjamin Netanyahu lamented the floods and referred to President Milei as a "dear friend".
- Ukraine: President Volodymyr Zelenskyy lamented the flooding during a phone call with President Milei concerning the Russia–Ukraine war.
