= Juan José Longhini =

Argentine footballer

Personal information
- Full name: Juan José Longhini
- Date of birth: 5 August 1984 (age 42)
- Place of birth: Olavarría, Argentina
- Position: Striker

Youth career
- Racing de Olavarría

Senior career*
Years	Team	Apps	(Gls)
2005–2006	Ferro de Tandil		
2006	Grupo Universitario	2	(1)
2007	Gimnasia de Tandil		
2007	Ferroviario CD		
2008–2009	Ferro de Olavarría	18	(7)
2009	Deportes La Serena	2	(0)
2010–2011	Unión Tarija		
2012	Perdenales		
2012	Argentino de Pehuajó		
2010–2014	Ferro de Olavarría	107	(36)
2014	Huracán de Goya	10	(5)
2016	Atlético Tapalqué		
2016	Estudiantes Olavarría		
2016–2017	Ferro de Olavarría	total	(above)
2018	El Fortín		
2019–2020	Racing de Olavarría	13	(2)
2021	Embajadores de Olavarría	8	(4)
2022	Gimnasia de Tandil		
2023	Estudiantes Olavarría	4	(1)
2024	Boca Juniors Azul		
- * Club domestic league appearances and goals

Juan José Longhini (born 5 August 1984 in Olavarría, Argentina) is an Argentine former footballer who played as a striker.

== Teams ==
- (Argentina) Ferro Carril Sud de Tandil 2005–2006
- (Argentina) Grupo Universitario 2006
- (Argentina) Gimnasia y Esgrima de Tandil 2007
- (Argentina) Ferroviario de Coronel Dorrego 2007
- (Argentina) Ferro Carril Sud de Olavarría 2008–2009
- (Chile) Deportes La Serena 2009
- (Bolivia) Unión Tarija 2010–2011
- (Argentina) Pedernales 2012
- (Argentina) Argentino de Pehuajó 2012
- (Argentina) Ferro Carril Sud de Olavarría 2013–2014
- (Argentina) Huracán de Goya 2014
- (Argentina) Atlético Tapalqué 2016
- (Argentina) Estudiantes de Olavarría 2016
- (Argentina) Ferro Carril Sud de Olavarría 2016–2017
- (Argentina) El Fortín 2018
- (Argentina) Racing de Olavarría 2019–2020
- (Argentina) Embajadores de Olavarría 2021
- (Argentina) Gimnasia y Esgrima de Tandil 2022
- (Argentina) Estudiantes de Olavarría 2023
- (Argentina) Boca Juniors de Azul 2024

== See also ==
- Football in Argentina
- List of football clubs in Argentina
