= Club Argentino =

Building in Bahia Blanca, Argentina

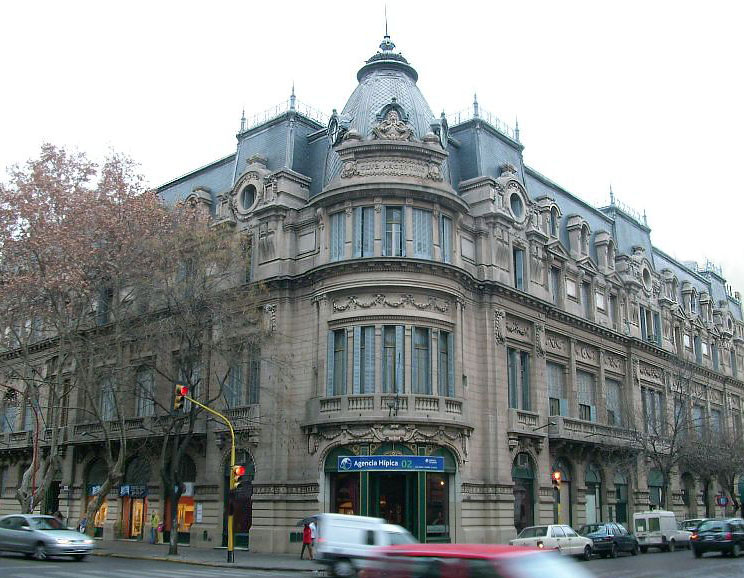
- Interactive map of the Club Argentino area

General information
- Architectural style: Neoclassical
- Coordinates: 38°43′10″S 62°16′6″W
- Year built: 1906-1910
- Opened: 1910

Club Argentino is a historic building located in central Bahía Blanca, Argentina. The building was designed to house the Club Argentino de Bahía Blanca, an aristocratic group based in the city. Inspired by French styles of architecture, it is considered one of the most emblematic and defining buildings in the city of Bahía Blanca.

== History ==
The Club Argentino de Bahía Blanca was established on March 1, 1906, followed by the construction of the Club Argentino in the city. The building's construction was led by architect Alberto Coni Molina, and the building was finished in 1910. The building was designed as a gathering place for the club, with features including areas for fencing, billiards, chess and an indoor swimming pool, the latter of which opened in 1930. Entrance to the club was restricted to men, with the Club Argentino building largely being centered to men in its early years.

The building was visited by US president Theodore Roosevelt, who visited Bahía Blanca as part of a greater tour of South America and Argentina. In his honor, the room in the building in which he stayed was named after him. Other visitors included John Pershing and Spanish president Niceto Alcalá Zamora. Manu Ginóbili, an Argentine basketball player, was also married in the building in 2004. In 2001, Club Argentino was declared a National Historical Monument by the Argentine government, and efforts began in the 2020s to construct a museum within the building for public use.
