= Bolsa de Comercio de Bahía Blanca =

Bolsa de Comercio de Bahía Blanca (Chamber of Commerce of Bahía Blanca) is the local stock exchange and chamber of commerce of the City of Bahía Blanca, Argentina.

== Foundation and purpose ==
It was founded on June 21, 1979. Its main see is located on Avda Colon 2, Bahía Blanca. Its representative office is located on 25 de Mayo 267, 4º Piso, City of Buenos Aires.

Acting as a private local stock exchange its main aim and objectives are intended to act on behalf of local customers regarding investments, stocks, shares and all related financial activities authorized by law and regulated by Banco Central de la República Argentina.

== Related support activities ==
Important additional related activities are providing financial, economical education, and reliable independent information -based on research- for which they support institutions such as CREEBBA, being one of the local referents and main consultants as far as non biased publications on financial activities are concerned, which helps the economical growth of the city and region, resulting in a clear benefit for the Administration (more enterprises and individuals contributing with taxes), enterprises (accurate information based on which the decision-making processes are facilitated) and individuals (increased possibilities of protection of savings, increasing them according to investments in the market).

== Culture ==
Since 1984 an annual exhibit of plastic arts is organized, open to the public with no admission fee. Pieces can be submitted by anyone being requested no submission-fee. They are eventually admitted after being accepted by a board of experts -different each year-, who are invited as such by their reputation and positions in the world of Arts. Close to the end of the exhibit and as a way of promoting plastic arts, prizes are awarded to five different pieces in order of merit. As real proof of good will and promotion of understanding amongst peoples, not long ago one of the top prizes was awarded to a plastic artist from the Falkland Islands, bought by the Chamber of Commerce itself to be shown in one of its main meeting rooms.

The see of the Chamber also hosts frequently reputed national and international speakers from different fields of expertise, generally open to the public with no admission fee. Facilities for simultaneous translation are available in selected meeting rooms.

The building, -see of the Chamber- originally from The Bank of Spain and Río de La Plata, was restored and refurbished ad-integrum respecting its original design and materials, following present architectural paradigms, for which a special team of experts were appointed for the direction of an appropriate refurbishment in keeping with the original style of the building, officially opened by the Governor of the Province of Buenos Aires, Eduardo Duhalde in 1995.

== See also ==
- Buenos Aires Stock Exchange
- MERVAL
