= Coat of arms of Bahía Blanca =

Coat of arms, City of Bahía Blanca

The coat of arms of the City of Bahía Blanca, Buenos Aires Province, Argentina

Created by Enrique Cabré Moré, Honorary Director of the Museum and Archive of History of the city, was officially adopted by municipal decree effective on May 18, 1943. The raising sun and the colours of the Argentine flag are taken from the coat of arms of the Nation. The anchor is symbolic of the maritime origin and culture of the city. Mountains (Sierra de la Ventana), the plain of Pampas, the original fortress and the estuary are present as symbols of the city and region where it is located. The Cross points at the Catholic tradition of the city.

Copyright of the Seal belongs to the City of Bahía Blanca, Provincia de Buenos Aires, Republica Argentina. Depicted here as illustration of fair use, according to the US laws on copyright and marque déposée according to the laws of copyright of France.
