= Luigi Luiggi =

Italian engineer and politician

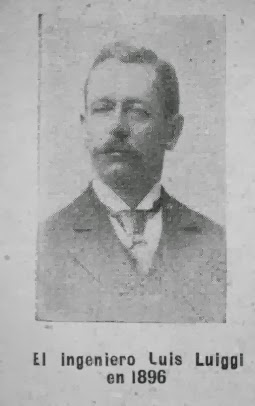
Luigi Luiggi

Luigi Luiggi (born 3 August 1856 in Genoa - 1 February 1931 in Rome) was an Italian engineer and politician. He was a senator for the Italian parliament. He led the Cabinet on the Ministry of Public Works from 1892 to 1893. He received the Order of the Crown of Italy and French Legion of Honour.
