= Olavarría, Argentina =

City in Buenos Aires Province, Argentina

Olavarría
- City
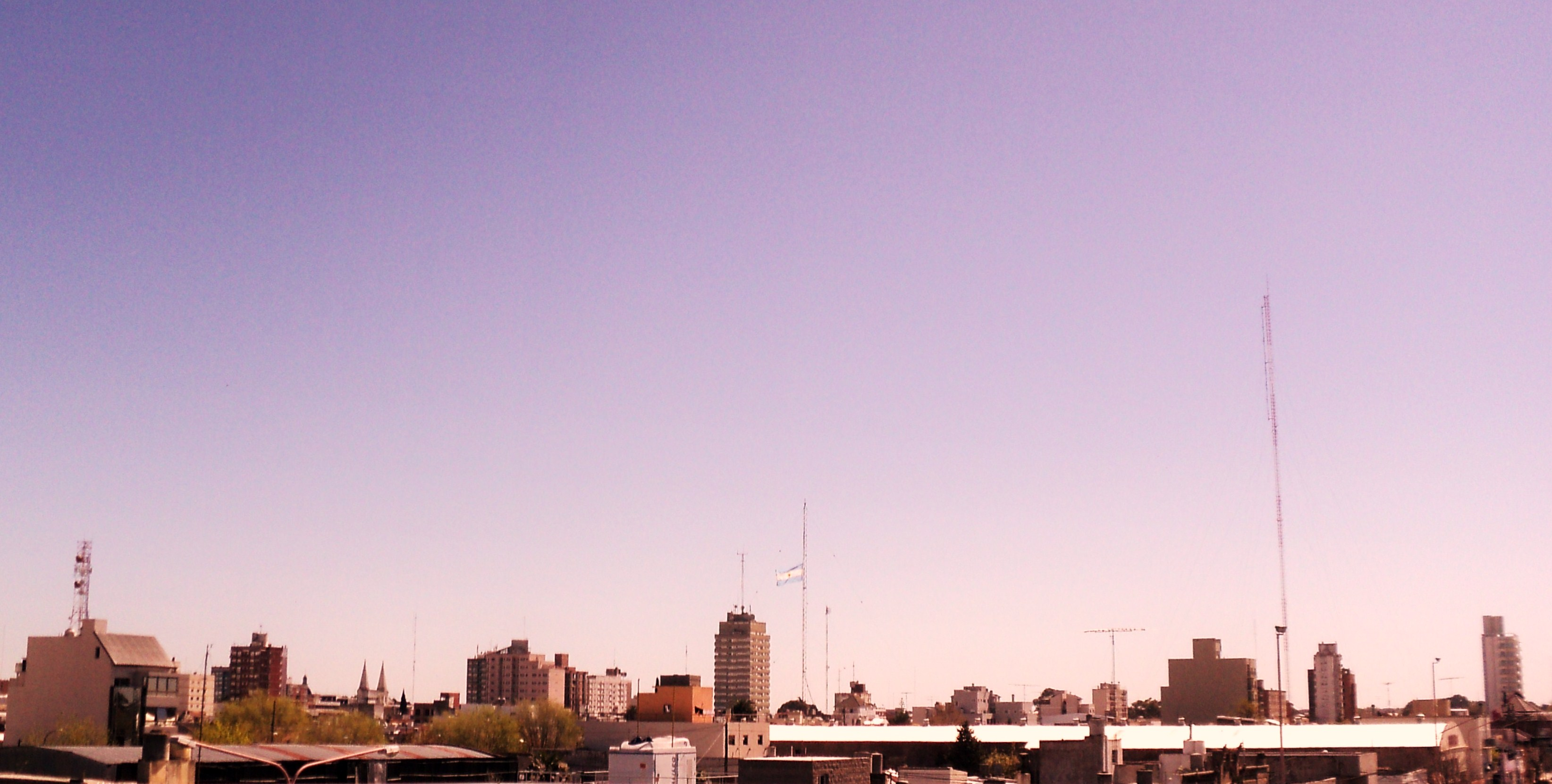
- Interactive map of Olavarría
- Coordinates: 36°54′S 60°20′W
- Country: Argentina
- Province: Buenos Aires
- Partido: Olavarría
- Founded: 25 November 1867

Area
  - Total: 7,715 km^{2} (2,979 sq mi)
- Elevation: 162 m (531 ft)

Population (2010 census [INDEC])
  - Total: 111,320
  - Density: 14.43/km^{2} (37.37/sq mi)
- CPA Base: B 7400
- Area code: +54 2284
- Website: Official website

Olavarría is a city in the province of Buenos Aires, Argentina. It is the administrative seat of the Olavarría Partido and has over 111,320 inhabitants, per the 2010 census [INDEC].

The settlement was officially founded on 25 November 1867, and named in honour of Colonel José Valentín de Olavarría (1801–1845), an early Argentine military leader.

== Climate ==
Climate data for Olavarría (1991–2020, extremes 1988–present)
Month	Jan	Feb	Mar	Apr	May	Jun	Jul	Aug	Sep	Oct	Nov	Dec	Year
Record high °C (°F)	39.7 (103.5)	37.2 (99.0)	34.2 (93.6)	33.0 (91.4)	29.2 (84.6)	22.1 (71.8)	24.9 (76.8)	32.5 (90.5)	30.2 (86.4)	33.8 (92.8)	35.2 (95.4)	37.6 (99.7)	39.7 (103.5)
Mean daily maximum °C (°F)	29.0 (84.2)	27.5 (81.5)	25.0 (77.0)	20.9 (69.6)	16.8 (62.2)	13.5 (56.3)	12.8 (55.0)	15.5 (59.9)	17.5 (63.5)	20.4 (68.7)	24.0 (75.2)	27.7 (81.9)	20.9 (69.6)
Daily mean °C (°F)	21.7 (71.1)	20.3 (68.5)	18.1 (64.6)	13.9 (57.0)	10.5 (50.9)	7.5 (45.5)	6.5 (43.7)	8.4 (47.1)	10.7 (51.3)	13.9 (57.0)	17.1 (62.8)	20.3 (68.5)	14.1 (57.4)
Mean daily minimum °C (°F)	14.1 (57.4)	13.5 (56.3)	11.8 (53.2)	8.3 (46.9)	5.5 (41.9)	2.4 (36.3)	1.6 (34.9)	3.1 (37.6)	4.7 (40.5)	7.6 (45.7)	10.1 (50.2)	12.5 (54.5)	7.9 (46.2)
Record low °C (°F)	2.4 (36.3)	2.1 (35.8)	0.6 (33.1)	−3.4 (25.9)	−5.5 (22.1)	−8.5 (16.7)	−8.4 (16.9)	−7.4 (18.7)	−6.5 (20.3)	−4.7 (23.5)	−0.6 (30.9)	2.0 (35.6)	−8.5 (16.7)
Average precipitation mm (inches)	111.8 (4.40)	98.2 (3.87)	108.1 (4.26)	92.1 (3.63)	56.7 (2.23)	38.5 (1.52)	37.5 (1.48)	50.0 (1.97)	56.1 (2.21)	91.4 (3.60)	88.9 (3.50)	84.0 (3.31)	913.2 (35.95)
Average precipitation days (≥ 0.1 mm)	8.5	7.1	8.1	7.7	5.7	5.2	5.6	5.1	6.3	9.0	9.0	8.1	85.6
Average snowy days	0.0	0.0	0.0	0.0	0.0	0.0	0.1	0.1	0.0	0.0	0.0	0.0	0.1
Average relative humidity (%)	65.9	71.3	77.2	78.7	81.9	82.0	81.3	77.6	76.6	76.3	71.5	64.9	75.4
Mean monthly sunshine hours	285.2	251.4	244.9	198.0	164.3	138.0	145.7	182.9	192.0	223.2	264.0	288.3	2,577.9
Mean daily sunshine hours	9.2	8.9	7.9	6.6	5.3	4.6	4.7	5.9	6.4	7.2	8.8	9.3	7.1
Source: Servicio Meteorológico Nacional

== Notable people ==
- Guillermo Avalos (1923–1978), athlete
- Pedro de la Vega (born 2001), footballer
- Dante Emiliozzi (1916–1989), racing driver
- Juan José Longhini (born 1984), footballer
- José Zampicchiatti (1900–1984), cyclist
