= GAIA locomotive =

Argentine locomotive builder

Gruppo Aziende Italiane e Argentine (GAIA)
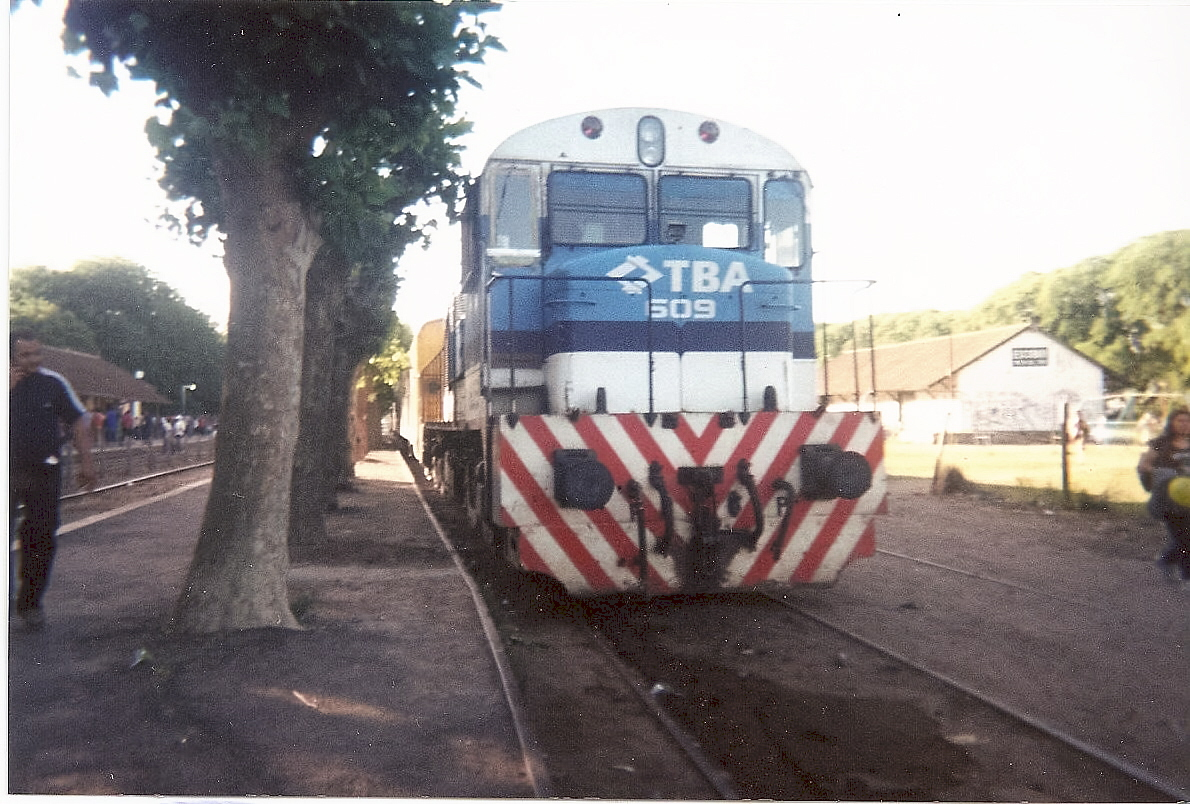
- GAIA locomotive in Escobar station of Mitre Line.
Type and origin
- Power type: Diesel
- Builder: Fiat Ferroviaria, Cometarsa, Ercole Marelli, Siam Di Tella, Breda, Pistoiesi, Ansaldo
- Model: 1050 / 1030
- Build date: 1962–1971
- Total produced: 280
Specifications
- Configuration
  - UIC: Co'–Co'
- Gauge: 1,676 mm (5 ft 6 in)
- Length: 17 m (56 ft)
- Loco weight: 92 t (90.5 long tons; 101.4 short tons)
- Power supply: 1036 HP
- Engine type: FIAT 288 ES I
Performance figures
- Maximum speed: 110 km/h (68 mph)
Career
- Operators: Ferrocarriles Argentinos; FEMESA; Nuevo Central Argentino; Metropolitano; Trenes de Buenos Aires
- Locale: Argentina
- First run: 1962
- Disposition: Some still in service

Gruppo Aziende Italiane e Argentine (mostly known for its acronym GAIA) was an Italian-Argentine conglomerate company that manufactured diesel locomotives for the Argentine railway network while being managed by Ferrocarriles Argentinos.

== History ==
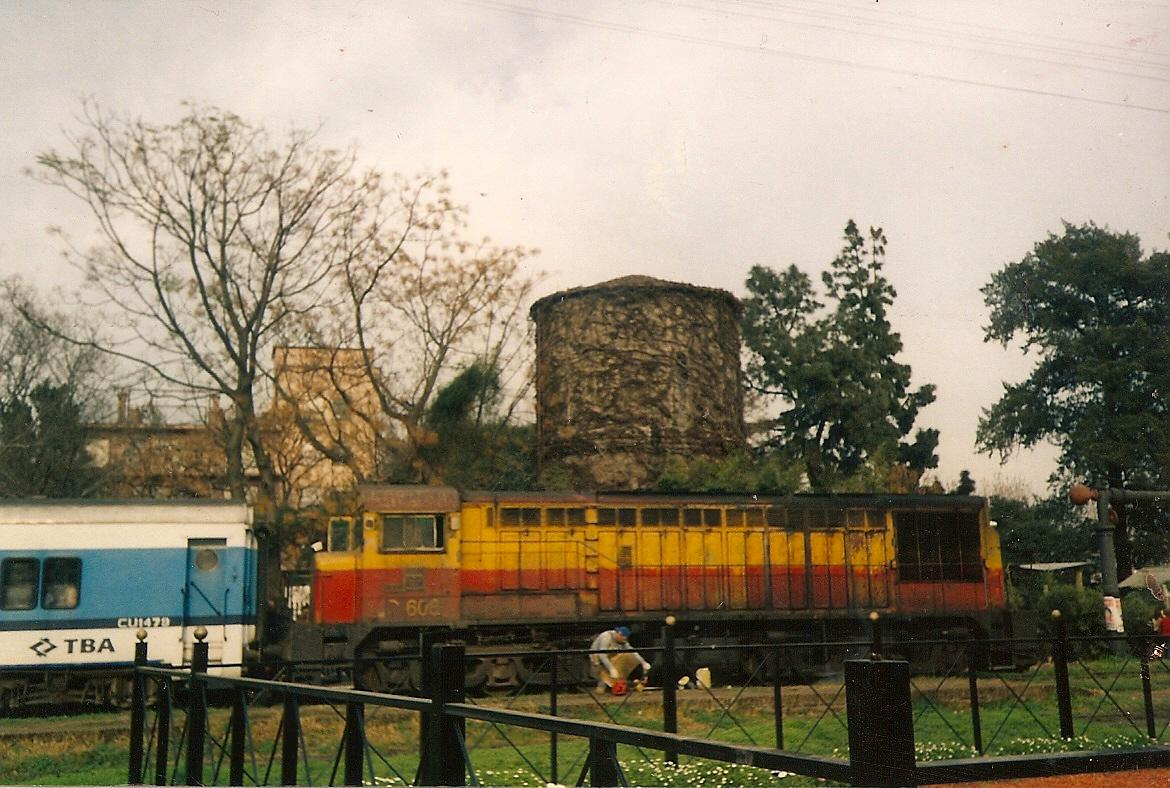
A GAIA locomotive used for passenger services when TBA was operator of Mitre Line.

Fiat Ferroviaria had been commissioned to build a total of 280 diesel engines to power the same quantity of locomotives that Argentine company Fábrica Argentina de Locomotoras (FAdeL) was planning to build. With 80 engines already arrived to Argentina and ready to be used the military dictatorship took over the presidency of Argentina after the Revolución Libertadora in 1955. FAdeL closed a year later, so the project could not be carried out.

Ferrocarriles Argentinos, the company that managed all the railway lines in Argentina, was forced to search a local manufacturer that was able to build diesel locomotives that could be run with the Fiat engines. Soon after, FA signed a contract with an Italian and Argentine consortium created for that purpose, "Gruppo Aziende Italiane e Argentine" (abbreviated "GAIA") in 1957.

The consortium was formed by the following companies:

Gruppo Aziende Italiane e Argentine
Country	Company	Area
Italy	Fiat	Diesel engines
Italy	Breda	Bodies, controls
Italy	O.M.	Bodies
Italy	Pistoiesi	Bodies
Italy	Ansaldo	Traction motors
Italy	Ercole Marelli	Project, technology
Argentina	Siam Di Tella	Generators, traction motors
Argentina	Cometarsa	Bodies, assembly line

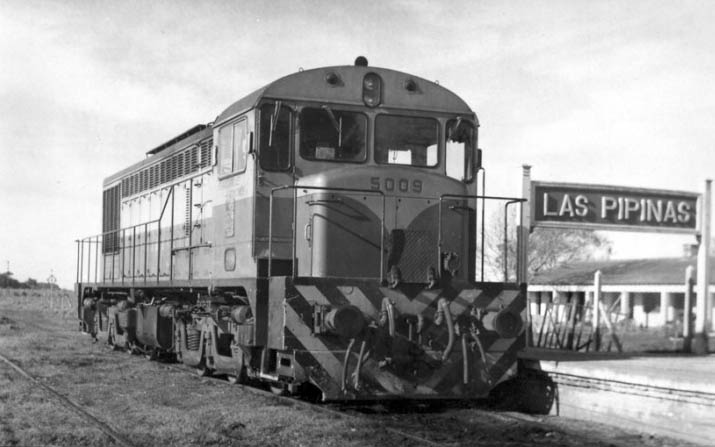
GAIA locomotive in Las Pipinas station, Buenos Aires Province, 1978.

The contract committed GAIA to build 280 machines for the 280 engines previously built by Fiat. One of the main conditions imposed to the consortium was to use the largest number of Argentine-made parts for the construction of the locomotives.

Two versions of the locomotives would be built: the first with 1300 HP (130 units) and the second with 1050 HP (150 units).

The first 80 machines were assembled in the Cometarsa (a company of Grupo Techint) workshops at Campana, Buenos Aires with all their components manufactured in Italy. Other 60 machines were produced with only the engines made in Argentina, and the rest 145 locomotives were totally built in Argentina between 1965 and 1970.

The first 130 locomotives (1300 HP) were delivered to FA in 1962 (numbered from 6201 to 6350) and sent to run on Mitre railway diesel branches (Victoria–Capilla del Señor and Villa Ballester–Zárate). The locomotives were also used in passenger trains from Retiro to San Pedro and in the Rosario area for freight services.

The San Martín railway also received some GAIA machines, which were used in passenger and local freight services. In 1968, other 20 machines were sent to Sarmiento railway that used them for passenger services to Mercedes, José Mármol and Lobos although the division would transfer all the machines to Roca railway in 1971. The Roca railway received 20 locomotives used to run local services to La Plata.

The GAIA locomotives were also the first to be painted in FA corporate colors (bordeaux-yellow-red). At the end of the 1970s several locomotives were equipped with new engines, some were powered with Fiat's A230. Nevertheless, the modification did not produce the expected results, so in 1987 the GAIA locomotives were replaced again with the ALCO 251B (that had been retired from some RSD-16 models).

After all the Argentine network was privatised in the early 1990s, the operative GAIA locomotives were taken over by their respective concessionaires that had been granted to operate passenger and freight services. Nuevo Central Argentino received 17 locomotives, Metropolitano 4 machines, and Trenes de Buenos Aires 10 machines. The rest of the locomotives were granted to other private and state-owned operators. State-owned FEMESA that temporarily operated the commuter rail services in Buenos Aires during the transicional period before privatisation, had also received 14 GAIA locomotives in 1992.
