= Rosario and Puerto Belgrano Railway =

Former French owned railway line in Argentina

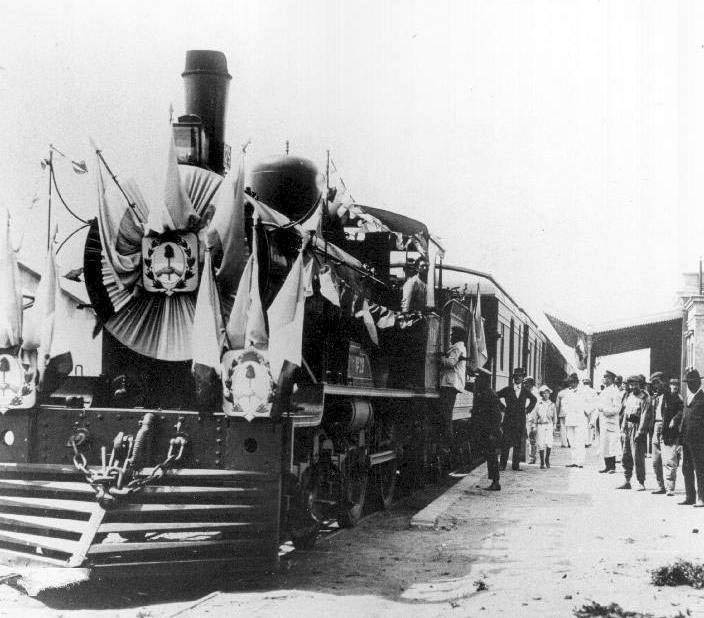
- Inaugural trip of the line, December 1910

Overview
- Native name: Ferrocarril Rosario y Puerto Belgrano
- Status: Company defunct; rail lines became part of Mitre and Roca Railways in 1948.
- Locale: Santa Fe and Buenos Aires Provinces
- Termini: Rosario; Puerto Belgrano

Service
- Type: Inter-city
- Services: 1
- Operators: Compagnie du Chemin de Fer de Rosario à Puerto Belgrano (1910-1948); Ferrocarriles Argentinos (1948-1991); Ferroexpreso Pampeano (1991–)

History
- Opened: 1910
- Closed: 1948; 78 years ago

Technical
- Track gauge: 1,676 mm (5 ft 6 in)
Route map
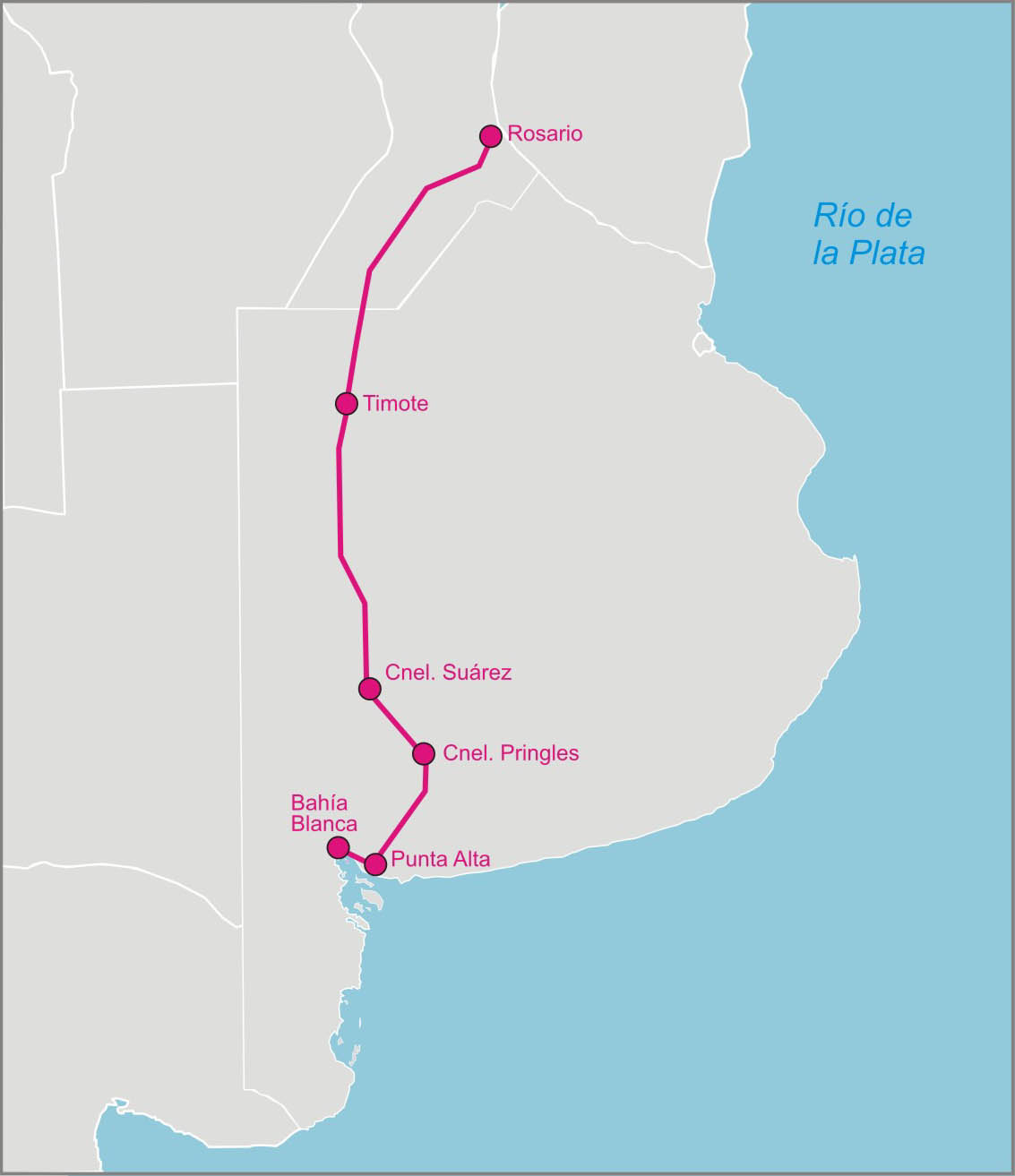

The Rosario and Puerto Belgrano Railway (Spanish: Ferrocarril Rosario y Puerto Belgrano, French: Compagnie du Chemin de Fer de Rosario à Puerto Belgrano) was a French-owned rail transport operations company which operated a 5 ft 6 in (1,676 mm) broad gauge, 5 ft 6 in (1,676 mm), single track line between the cities of Rosario and Puerto Belgrano in Argentina.

Puerto Belgrano, near the city of Bahía Blanca in Buenos Aires Province, is the main naval base in Argentina. The original idea behind the building of the railway was to link points that were closer to either Rosario or Bahía Blanca than they were to Buenos Aires, thereby taking traffic from the British-owned companies BA Great Southern and BA Western railways.

== History ==
=== Background ===
Since the line was constructed after many other east-to-west lines had already been laid, these were crossed by constructing a large number of bridges. The otherwise near level course of the line was broken, at intervals, by short sharp gradients and this had an effect on the type of locomotives that could be used. In spite of this, a considerable volume of goods and livestock traffic was carried by the line.

The original concession for the construction of the railway was granted to Diego de Alvear with the promulgation of Law N° 4.279 of 1903. That concession was then transferred to the French-owned company "Sociedad Anónima Compañía del Ferrocarril Rosario a Puerto Belgrano" in December 1906. The concessionary was committed to build a dock in Puerto Belgrano, the terminus of the line.

=== Project ===
The Indian gauge 800-km length railway ran from north to south, joining the cities of Rosario, Santa Fe and Punta Alta, crossing most of the main British-owned railway tracks. The railway had also a particular path with no stops in Buenos Aires but other cities of the Province such as Coronel Pringles and Coronel Suárez. The costs of construction were high so the railway required several engineering, for example the seven iron bridges that cross the Sauce Grande River, near Bahía Blanca.

The north–south orientation of the railway path revealed the purpose of competing against British companies for the traffic of merchandises in Buenos Aires. Nevertheless, the railway did not earn the expected profits due to better prices established by British railways. Besides, the RPBR crossed low developed agricultural areas instead of more fertile areas covered by British companies. For those reasons, the RPBR suffered a chronic deficit.

=== Construction and development ===
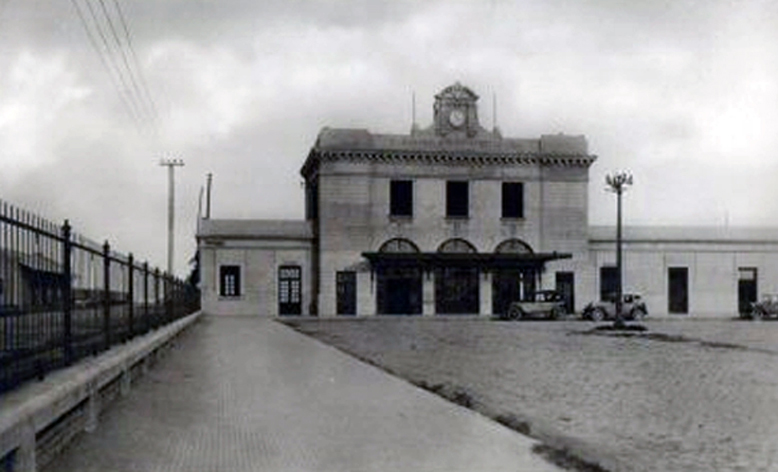
Bahía Blanca station building in 1930

The line was built between 1906 and 1910 quickly, being definitely inaugurated for passenger and freight services in 1912. The military port of Bahía Blanca received all the goods necessary for the construction of the railway, including rail tracks and even prefabricated home for employees, steam locomotives and coaches. The line started in Rosario, reaching Punta Alta station and then Puerto Belgrano dock that was being built by then. A branch from Punta Alta to Bahía Blanca was built later.

The construction also included a total of 36 bridges, totalling 857 mt. The dock made for Puerto Belgrano was a 250-metre length structure where four 125-metre length ships could enter at a same time to unload their cargo. There also were 12 cranes, 12 electric and 4 hydraulic.

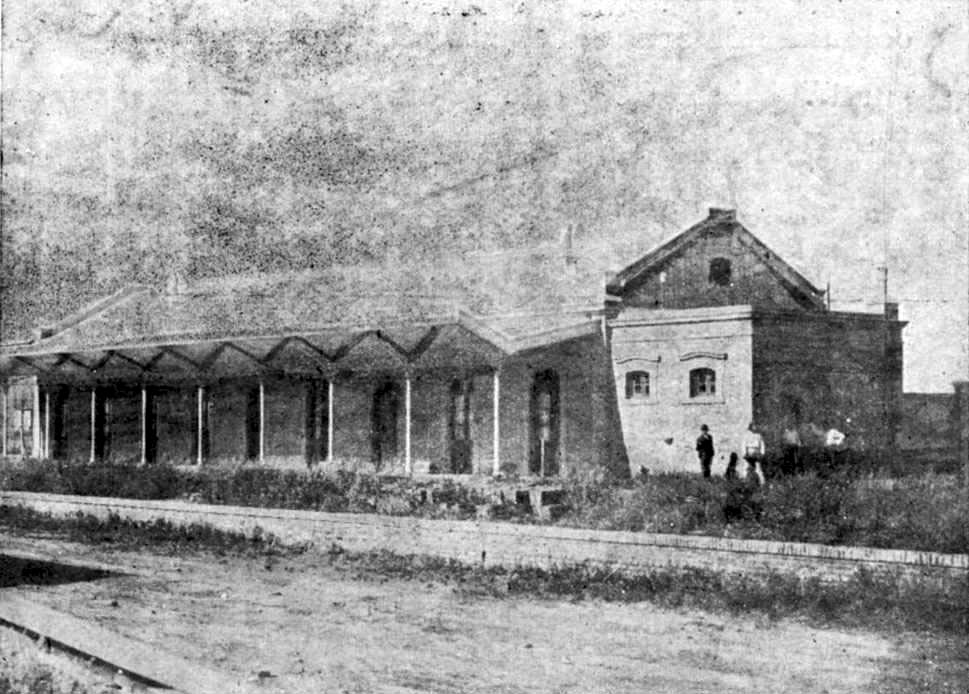
Coronel Suárez station, then part of Ferrocarril General Roca after the 1948 nationalization

Once the dock was finished, it was acquired by the Government of Argentina and added to the Navy in 1914. The company made the arrangements to get a concession to build an extension branch to Bahía Blanca and an access to Port of ingeniero White through a junction with Buenos Aires Great Southern Railway to freight services exclusively. Concession was granted so therefore the RPBR started to work. The line connected with Central Argentine and Western railways in Rosario and Timote respectively.

The company set headquarters in Villa Diego (Rosario) in 1909, where a passenger and freight station (named "Coronel Aguirre") was built. The building also included a locomotive warehouse, workshops and a switchyard. The buildings are currently part of Ciudad Universitaria de Rosario.

The construction of a 27-km length branch from Punta Alta to Bahía Blanca allowed the company to stimulate passenger and freight traffic. Works were directed by Swiss Engineer Armin Reimman who died short after the line was inaugurated, being replaced by his colleague Lucien Capelle. In 1921 the new terminus was inaugurated, it was placed on Colón Avenue between B. de Irigoyen and Rivadavia streets. The station remained active until 1949 when it was closed, serving as bus terminus since then.

After some testings, on March 2, 1922, the inaugural trip from Rosario to Bahía Blanca was carried out, arriving to the Southern city at 15:30.

=== Final ===
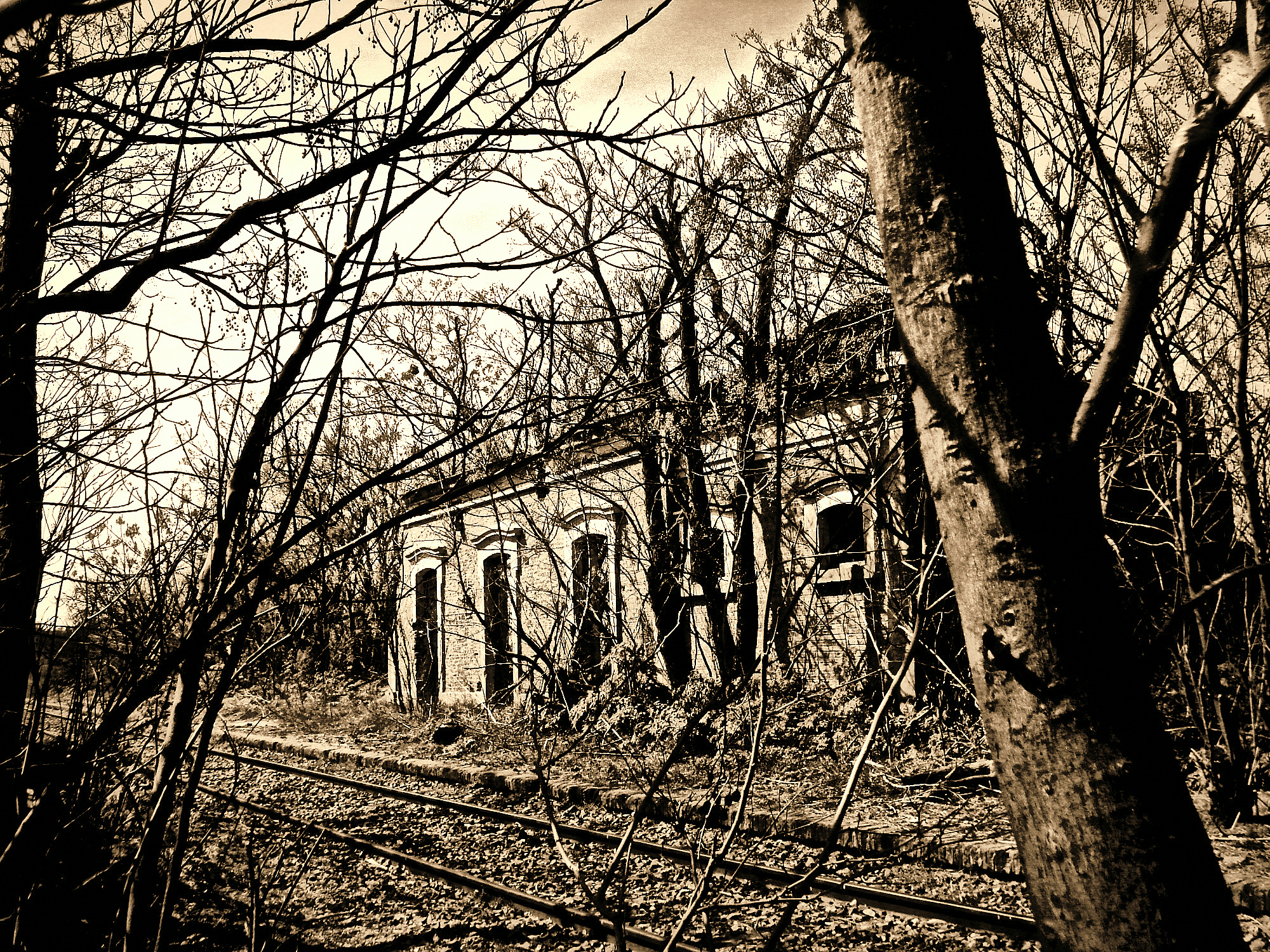
Los Muchachos station in Santa Fe Province as seen in 2011

When the whole Argentine railway network was nationalised by the Juan Peron's administration in 1948, the RPBR line was divided into two sections, the north (from Rosario to Ingeniero Beaugey - Km. 347) became part of Mitre Railway while the south section (from Beaugey to Puerto Belgrano) was added to Roca Railway.

In August 1977, as part of Martínez de Hoz's railway cuts, Ferrocarriles Argentinos closed the section between Bajo Hondo and Coronel Pringles (effectively isolating the Puerto Belgrano-Bahía Blanca branch line), as well as Rosario station, moving passenger services to Rosario Central, which would also be closed that same year.

With the railway privatisation led by President Carlos Menem in early 1990s, the R&PB line was granted in concession to freight rail transport company Ferroexpreso Pampeano. The last passenger service of the line, which ran from Bahía Blanca to Punta Alta, was discontinued in February 1990.

== Bibliography ==
- “Capitaux françaises dans la Pampa: le chemin de fer de Rosario à Puerto Belgrano”, by Gustavo Chalier- Revue d’histoire des chemins de fer, Nº 45, “Regards sur le XXe siècle”, publicación de la Association pour l’histoire des chemins de fer, París, (2014), pp. 35–56 (ISSN 0996-9403)
- “À la recherche du port perdu: el ferrocarril Rosario Puerto Belgrano y la búsqueda de una salida al mar en la Bahía Blanca”, by Gustavo Chalier- Miguel Ángel De Marco (h), compilador; María Beatriz Girardi y Juan Pablo Robledo, editores: Acta de las 6tas. Jornadas Internacionales e Interdisciplinarias de Estudios Portuarios, NODO IH - IDEHESI/CONICET, Rosario. (2015), pp. 177–194 (ISBN 978-987-33-8430-1)
- British Steam on the Pampas by D.S. Purdom - Mechanical Engineering Publications Ltd, London (1977) - ISBN 978-0852983539
- Foreign Capital, Local Interests and Railway Development in Argentina: French Investments in Railways 1900-1914 by Andrés Regalsky - Journal of Latin American studies - Cambridge Univ. Press (1989)
- EL ENCUENTRO DE DOS PUERTOS: ROSARIO Y PUERTO BELGRANO UNIDOS POR RIELES FRANCESES by Sebastián Morán on Boletín del Centro Naval n° 849, Sep–Dec 2018
