= Organismo Nacional de Administración de Bienes =

Argentine state organization

Organismo Nacional de Administración de Bienes (Spanish, National Organization of Assets Administration, abbreviated ONABE) is an Argentine state organization in charge of managing and guarding assets that are not directly employed by the State in its usual activities, and provide access to them by the public.

ONABE was created by Decree No. 443/00 of President Fernando de la Rúa on 1 July 2000, merging the National Office of State Assets and the National Entity for the Administration of Railway Assets (ENABIEF), and leaving the new organ under the dependency of the Ministry of Infrastructure and Housing.
