= Ferroexpreso Pampeano =

Argentine freight railway company

Ferro Expreso Pampeano

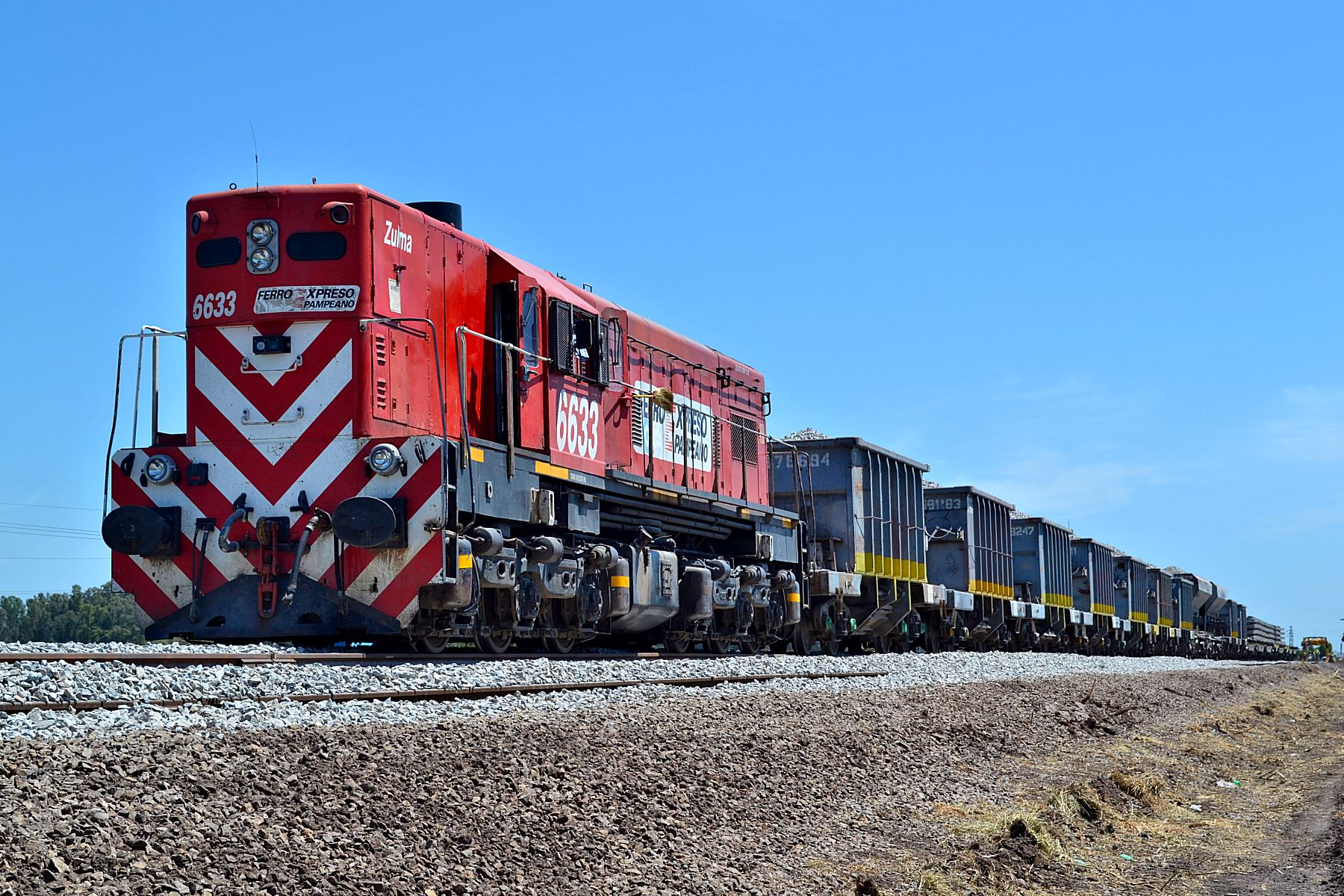
- A Ferroexpreso locomotive carrying rail construction materials
- Type: S.A.
- Industry: Rail transport
- Predecessor: Ferrocarriles Argentinos
- Founded: 1991; 35 years ago
- Area served: Argentina
- Production output: 3,500,009 tonnes carried (2014)
- Services: Rail freight transport
- Net income: AR$ 555,650 (2014)
- Owner: Techint (62%); SCP (18%)
- Number of employees: 1,130 (2013)
- Divisions: Sarmiento Railway; Roca Railway
- Website: scp.com.ar/ferroexpreso

Ferroexpreso Pampeano S.A. (abbreviated FEPSA) is an Argentine private railway company that operates freight services over a 5,094 km (3,165 mi) 5 ft 6 in (1,676 mm) network that comprises broad gauge Sarmiento Railway and the Rosario and Puerto Belgrano section of Roca Railway.

FEPSA is currently owned by Sociedad Comercial del Plata (SCP), and Techint, two of the largest companies in Argentina. FEPSA's operating fleet includes 52 diesel locomotives and 2,106 wagons.

== History ==
After the entire Argentine rail network was privatised in the early 1990s, the Government of Argentina granted a concession to the company to operate freight services within provinces of Buenos Aires and La Pampa but with branches extending into neighbouring Córdoba, San Luis and Santa Fe provinces. The former Rosario and Puerto Belgrano Railway section is the most heavily used branch. Ferroexpreso Pampeano started operations in November 1991.

In 2014, Ferroexpreso Pampeano carried 350,000 tonnes of foodstuffs and 3,500,009 tonnes of freight in total.

== Gallery ==
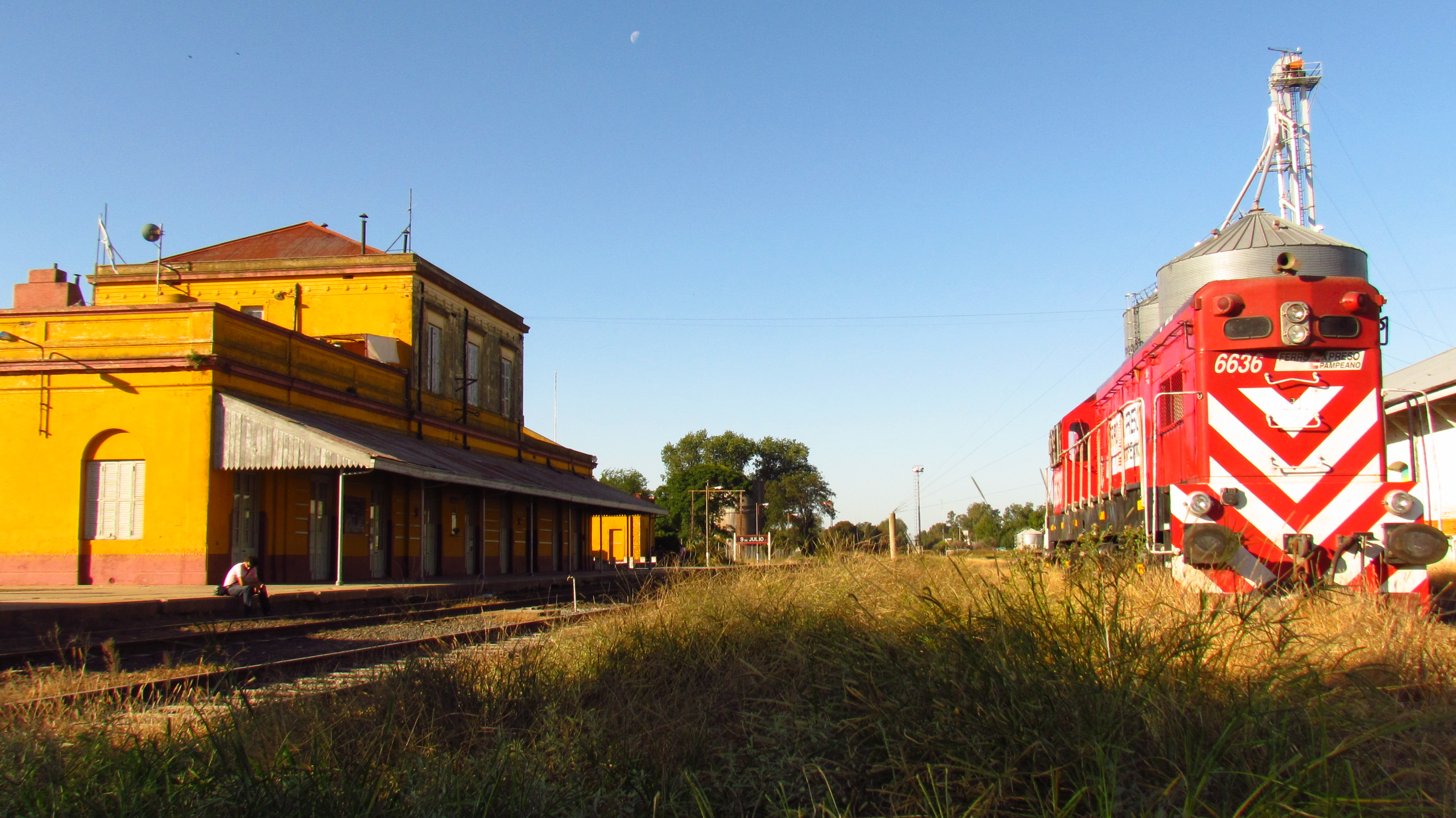

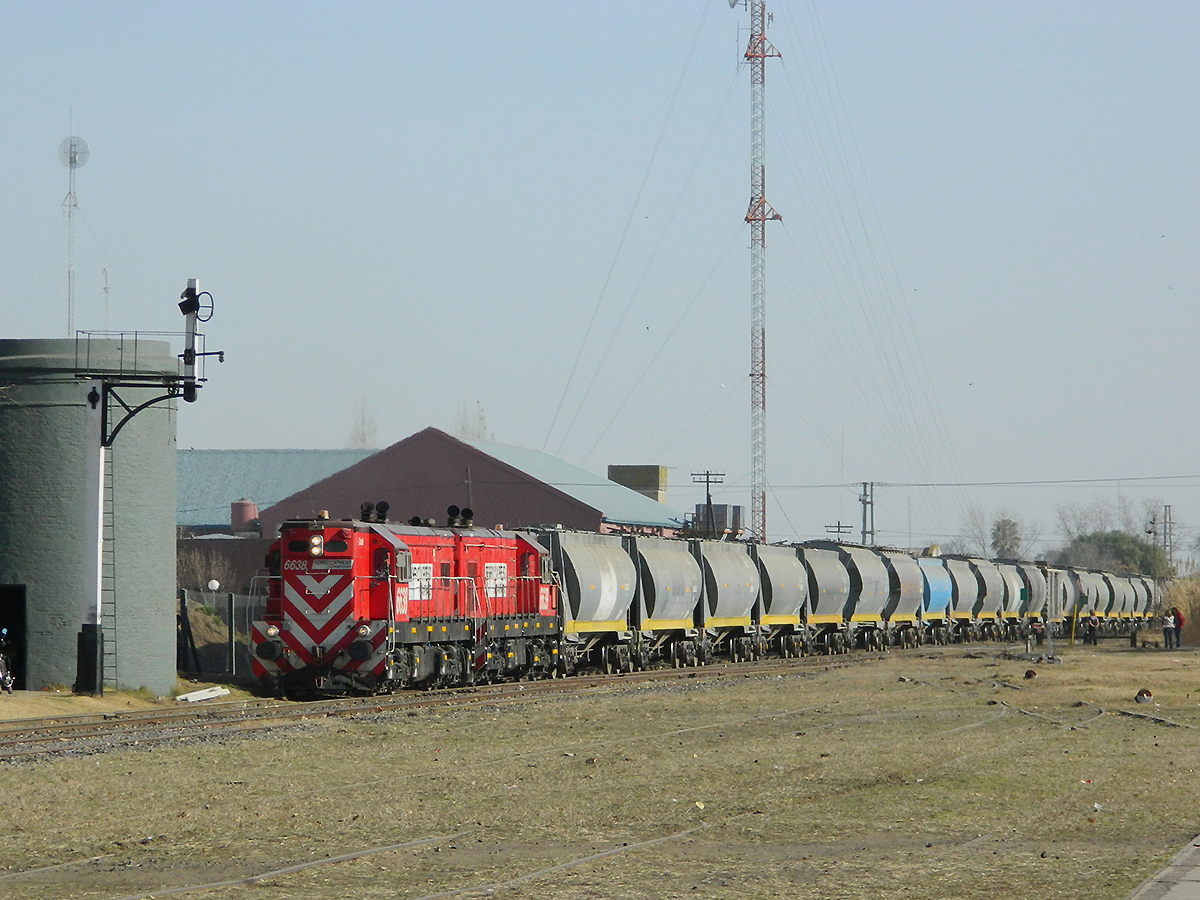

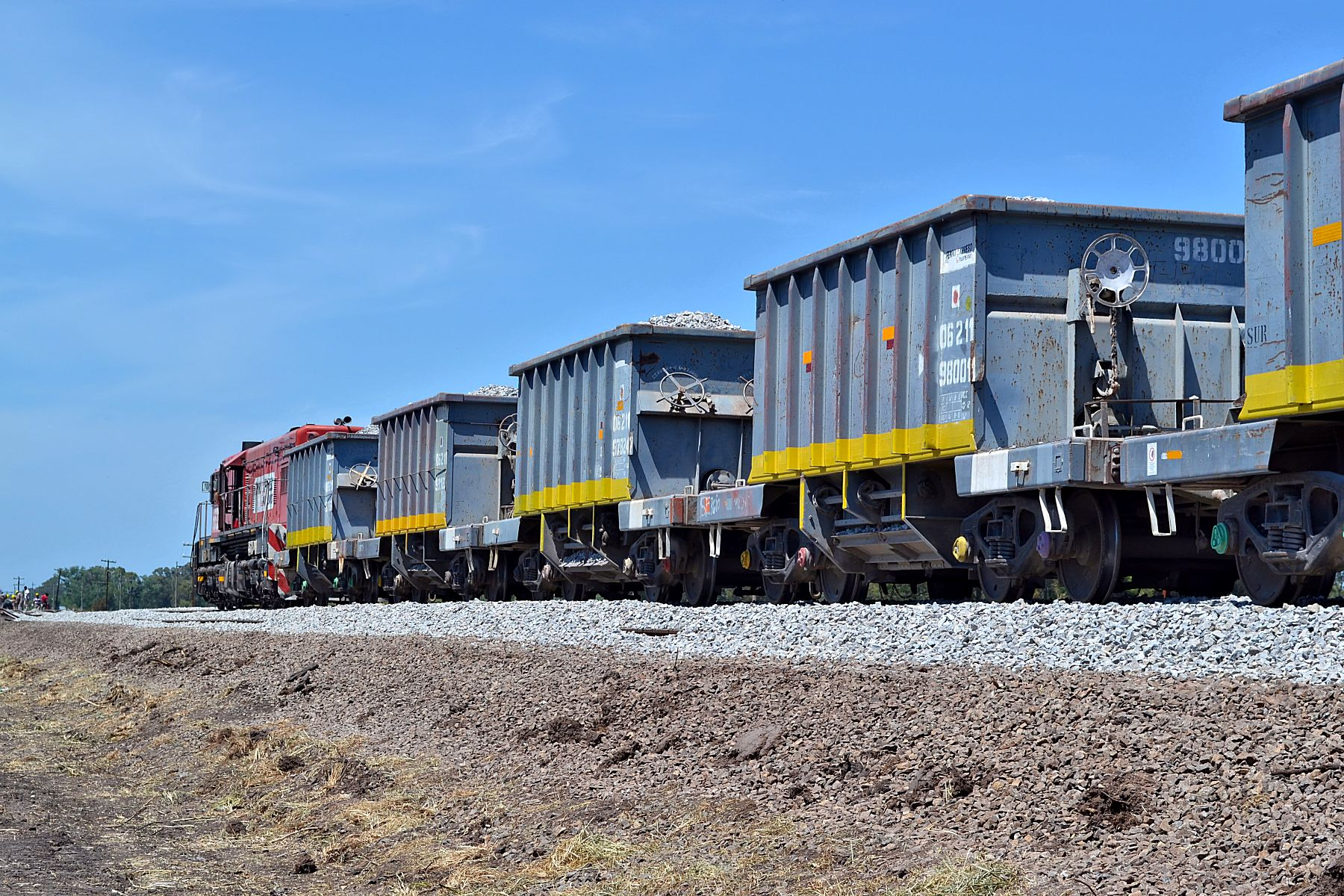

== See also ==
- Rail transport in Argentina
- Domingo Sarmiento Railway
- Railway privatisation in Argentina
