= Ente Nacional de Administración de Bienes Ferroviarios =

Ente Nacional de Administración de Bienes Ferroviarios (Spanish, National Entity for the Administration of Railway Assets; abbreviated ENABIEF) was an Argentine state organization charged with managing and preserving the assets of former railway companies (vehicles, railways, stations, etc.) that had not been privatized at the beginning of the 1990s.

ENABIEF was created by Decree No. 1383/96 of the Executive Branch (presided by Carlos Menem) in 1996. Its seat was the building formerly occupied by the state company Ferrocarriles Argentinos in Buenos Aires. The organization was fused with the National Office of State Assets (Dirección Nacional de Bienes del Estado) by another decree (No. 443/00) on 1 June 2000, into the present-day National Organization of State Assets (Organismo Nacional de Administración de Bienes, ONABE), under the control of the Ministry of Infrastructure and Housing.
