= Ferrocarriles Argentinos =

Argentine state-owned railway company

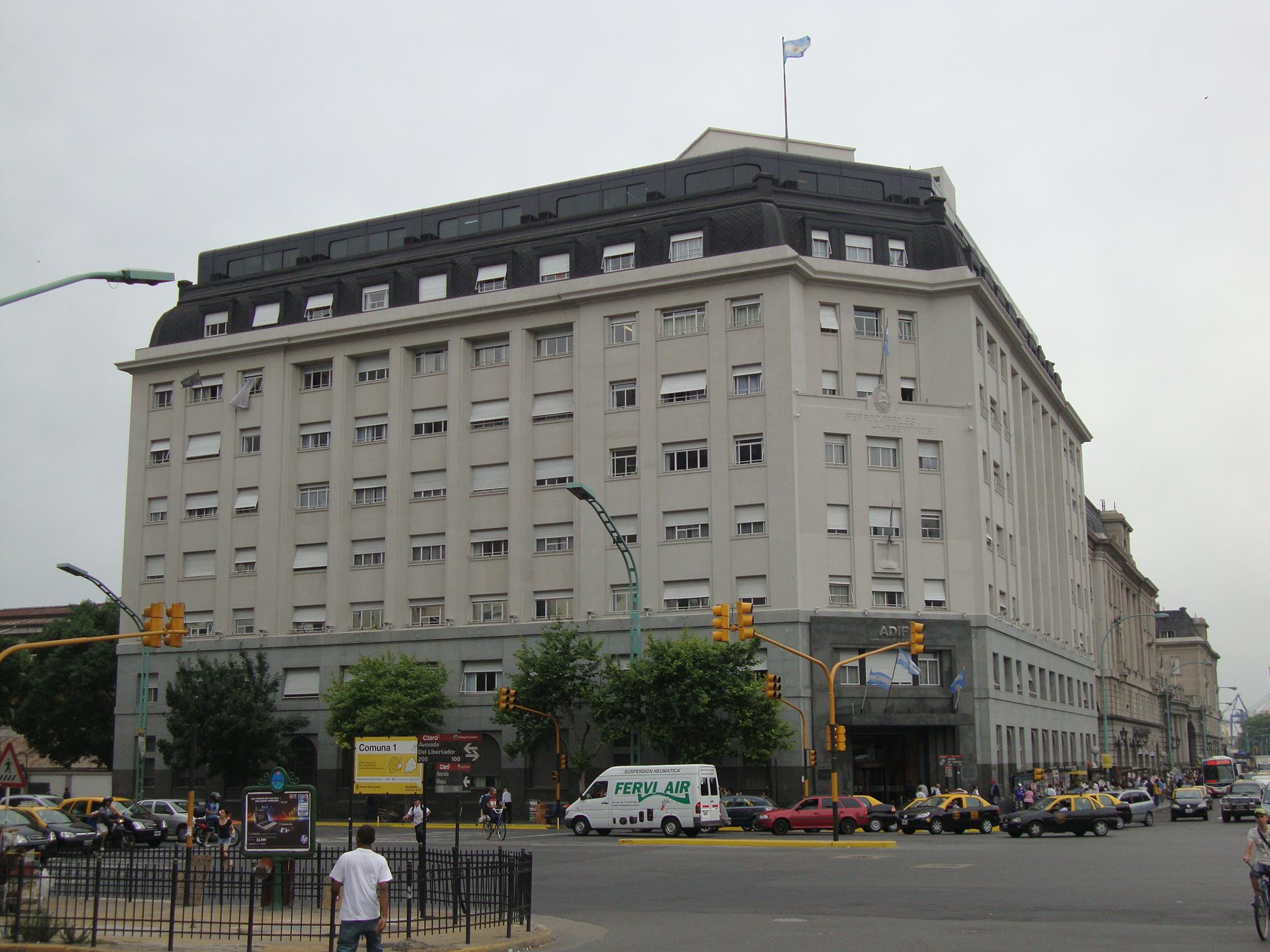
- FA headquarters building in Retiro
- Type: State-owned
- Industry: Railway
- Predecessor: List: Bahía Blanca & NW; BA Great Southern; BA Northern; BA & Rosario; Central Argentine; Central Chubut; Córdoba Central; Córdoba North Western; Córdoba & Rosario; East Argentine; BA & Ensenada; Entre Ríos; Midland; Great Western; North Eastern; North Western; Pacific; Santa Fe & Córdoba GS; Santa Fe Western; Trasandine; Villa María & Rufino; Western; Compañía General de Buenos Aires; Provincial de Santa Fe; Rosario y Puerto Belgrano; San Cristóbal a Tucumán; Andino; Argentino del Norte; Central de Buenos Aires; Central Entrerriano; Central Norte; Del Chaco; Patagónicos; Primer Entrerriano; Provincial de Buenos Aires; Rural de Buenos Aires; State Railway
- Founded: 1 March 1948
- Founder: Government of Argentina
- Defunct: 1995; 31 years ago
- Fate: Dissolved
- Successor: List: Ferroexpreso Pampeano; Ferrosur Roca; Ferrocarriles Argentinos (2015); Buenos Aires al Pacífico; Nuevo Central Argentino; Ferrocarriles Mesopotámicos; Trenes de Buenos Aires; Metropolitano; Ferrovías; Metrovías
- Headquarters: Buenos Aires, Argentina
- Area served: National
- Services: Public transport
- Operating income: (1983)
- Net income: AR$ 22,000 million
- Total assets: 45,000-km railway lines
- Number of employees: 56,000 (1978)

Ferrocarriles Argentinos (abbreviated as FA; lit. 'Argentine Railways') was a state-owned company that managed the entire Argentine railway system for nearly 45 years. It was formed in 1948 when all the private railway companies were nationalised during Juan Perón's first presidential term, and transformed into the Empresa de Ferrocarriles del Estado Argentino (EFEA; lit. 'Argentine State Railways Company').

FA managed both passenger and freight services, including long-distance and commuter rail trains in the metropolitan area of Buenos Aires.

The company was broken up under the government of Carlos Menem following the privatisation of the railways; however in 2015 the government of Cristina Kirchner revived the brand for use on state-owned railways.

== Beginning ==
In April 1946 some British companies executives, such as Reginald Leeper (then ambassador in Argentina) and Wilfred Eady, representative of several railway companies in Argentina, started to make the arrangements for the sale of their companies to the Argentine state. A commission led by Eady arrived in Buenos Aires during the winter of 1946. The Argentine Government approved the creation of a joint company to operate British railways, reestablishing the tax exemptions that had been in force during Law n° 5,315, also named "Mitre Law".

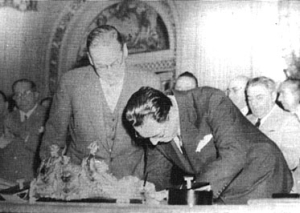
President Juan Perón signing the acquisition of foreign railway companies in 1948

On 17 December 1946, a contract was signed by Miguel Miranda, president of Instituto Argentino de Promoción del Intercambio and the ambassador Wladimir D'Ormesson for the sale of French companies in Argentina at a global price of A$ 182,796,173 (about US$45 million). That included Compañía General de Buenos Aires, Province of Santa Fe and Rosario and Pto. Belgrano Railways.

Two weeks after the agreement signed with French companies, the Government made an offer of £ 125 million to British companies although the railways were finally acquired at £150 million. The acquisition would be paid by Argentina with exports of meat and cereal to Great Britain, which would transfer the money to the former owners of the rail companies. On 1 March 1948, the Argentine government led by president Juan Perón took over the British railways. The acquisition of the foreign railways was shown by the government as an act of sovereignty that would contribute to development of Argentine industry.

After the nationalisation, the Argentine network continued expansion until 1954, when it reached a peak of 47,000 kilometres (29,000 mi) length, the most in its history. The Argentine network was also the biggest in Latin America.

=== Divisions ===
After the nationalisation all the Argentine network was grouped into six railway divisions named after distinguished Argentine presidents and national heroes (such as José de San Martín, Manuel Belgrano, Domingo Sarmiento, Justo José de Urquiza, Bartolomé Mitre and Julio A. Roca) according to their track gauge and locality. Apart from former British and French companies, Argentine ones also became part of "Ferrocarriles Argentinos", the state-owned company specifically created after the nationalisation to manage the entire railway network.

The list of divisions that Ferrocarriles Argentinos was divided into was as follows:

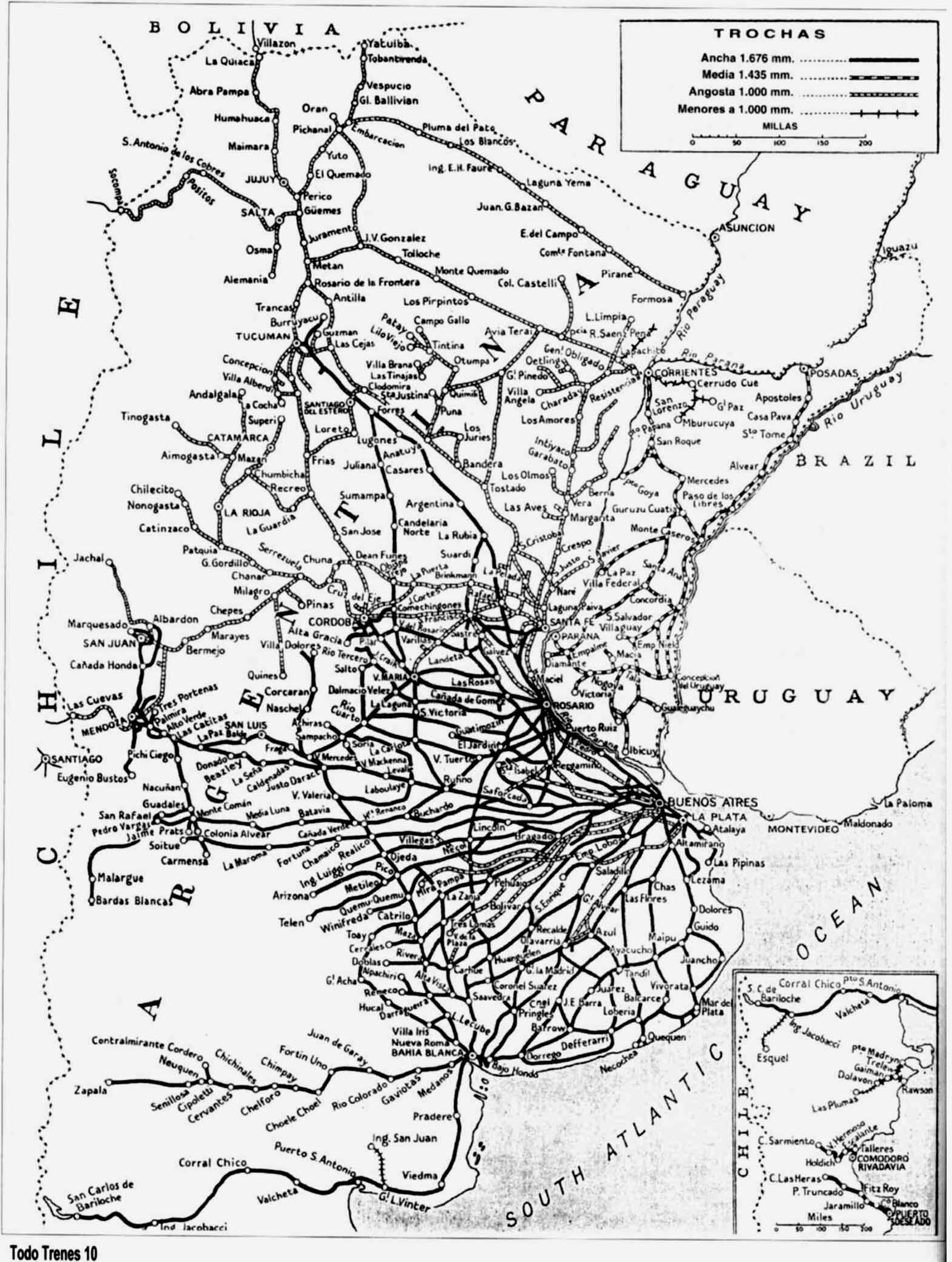
Map of the Argentine network during its maximum extension, c. 1954

Ferrocarriles Argentinos (1948)
Division	Provinces covered
Belgrano	La Rioja, Catamarca, Córdoba, Tucumán, Formosa, Chaco, Santiago del Estero, Salta, Jujuy, Mendoza
Mitre	Buenos Aires, Santa Fe, Córdoba, Sgo. del Estero, Tucumán
Urquiza	Buenos Aires, Santa Fe, Entre Ríos, Corrientes, Misiones
Roca	Buenos Aires, La Pampa, Río Negro, Neuquén, Chubut, Santa Cruz
San Martín	Buenos Aires, Santa Fe, Córdoba, Mendoza, San Luis, San Juan
Sarmiento	Buenos Aires, La Pampa, Córdoba, San Luis, Mendoza

== Reorganisation ==
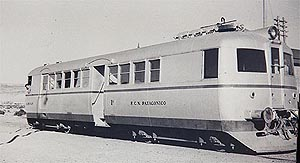
Drewry railcars that served the Patagonian Railway before the nationalisation

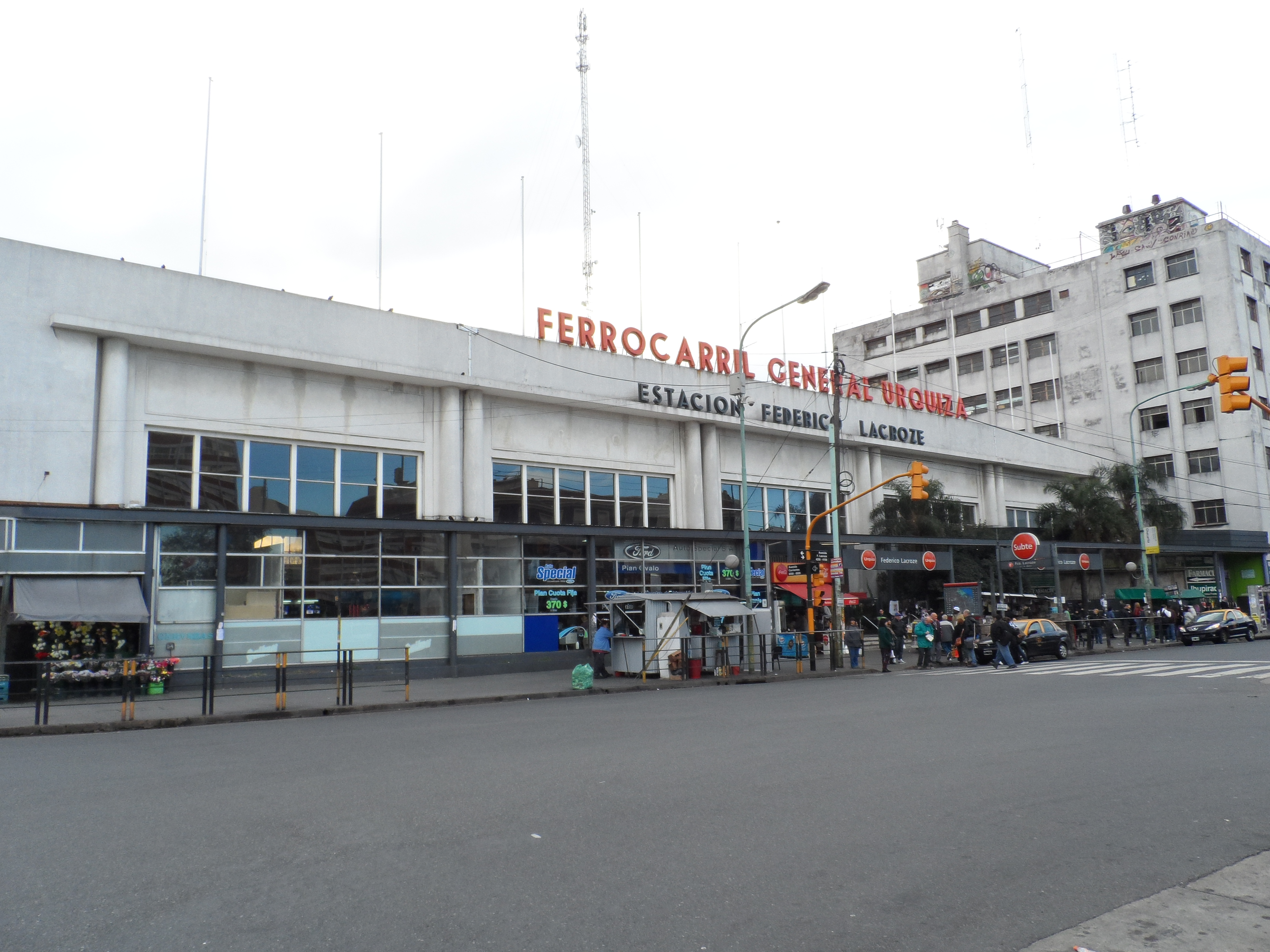
Federico Lacroze station was inaugurated in 1957

After the nationalisation, the Midland and Compañía General rail lines became part of Belgrano Railway while the province of Buenos Aires Railway was transferred to the state in December 1951, operating as an independent unit until 1953 when it was finally added to Belgrano network.

On 1 January 1954, a new state-owned company, "Ferrocarril Nacional Provincia de Buenos Aires" was established, inheriting the infrastructure and rolling stock from former French companies. The railway network formerly operated by Midland became "M" line, while the Compañía General line became "G" line.

On 14 May 1949, the Argentine state acquired the Buenos Aires Central Railway, owned by the Lacroze Brothers, adding it to the standard gauge General Urquiza Railway network. In 1957 the new General Urquiza railway terminus in Buenos Aires was inaugurated, naming it "Federico Lacroze". The narrow gauge "Ferrocarril Depietri" railway (that connected cities of San Pedro and Arrecifes) would be later added in November 1949.

Nevertheless, trains would be never run again on the line because the Provincial Railway did not show interest in the 68-km length line. The recently created Belgrano Railway did not take over the line. Therefore, the Argentine state returned the line to "Ferrocarriles y Elevadores Depietri" company. Depietri decided to bid the railway infrastructure as scrap. The state finally compensated Depietri for the deterioration of the line and the stolen material in 1975.

In Patagonia region there were only a bunch of rail lines built and managed by the state but not connect between. They were FC Viedma-Nahuel Huapi, Comodoro Rivadavia Railway, Puerto Deseado Railway, all of them of broad gauge. Other railways were of narrow gauge, such as La Trochita, Gral. Vintter to Gral. Conesa (108 km) and Central Chubut Railway that connected Puerto Madryn with Playa Unión and Alto Las Plumas.

Those lines were managed by state-owned Ferrocarriles Patagónicos with the exception of Viedma-Bariloche and Jacobbacci-Esquel that had become part of General Roca Railway after nationalisation. The rest of the network would be added in 1956.

Likewise, other branches were closed, such as the 1,9-km length to Basilica of Our Lady of Luján, where thousand of pilgrims arrived each 8 December. to celebrate Solemnity of the Virgin Mary. Services were cancelled in 1955 and the station demolished, while its tracks were lifted a year later. The Municipality of Luján built a park (named "Basílica") on the same land where the station stood.

== Rolling stock improvement ==
=== National manufacturers impulse ===
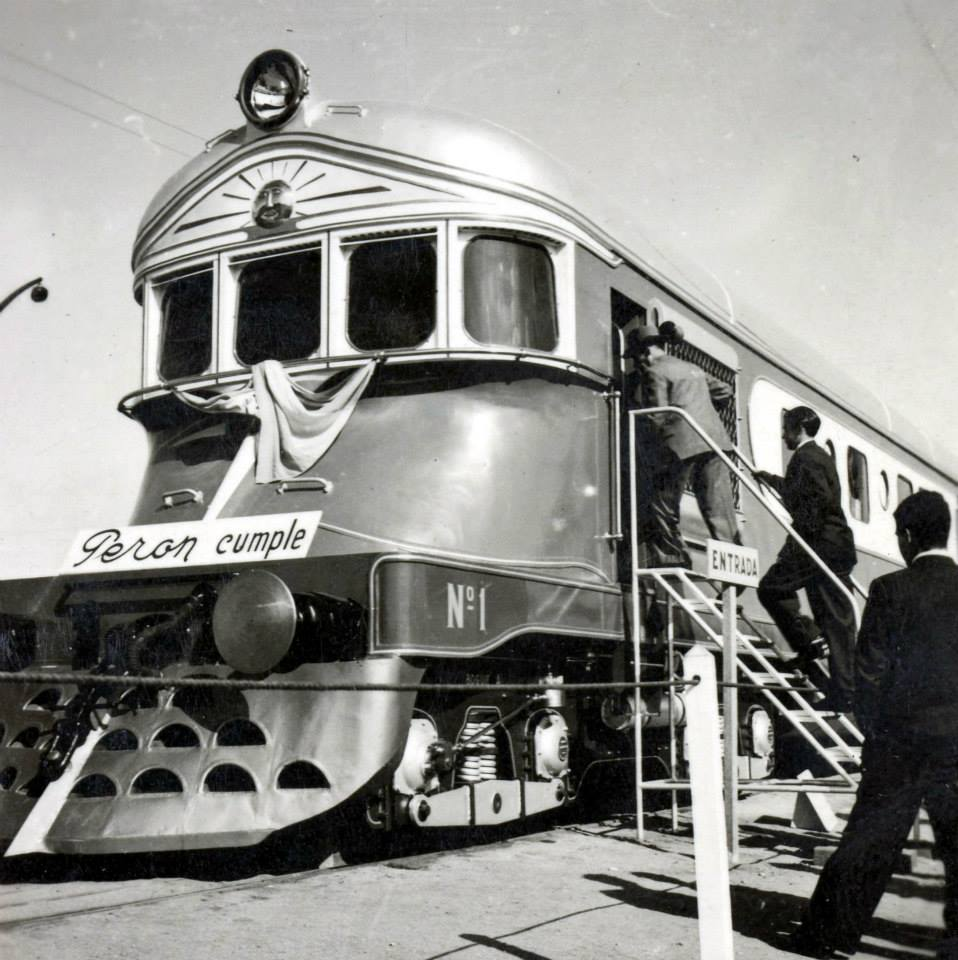
The Justicialista model by FAdeL was the first diesel locomotive produced in Argentina, 1948

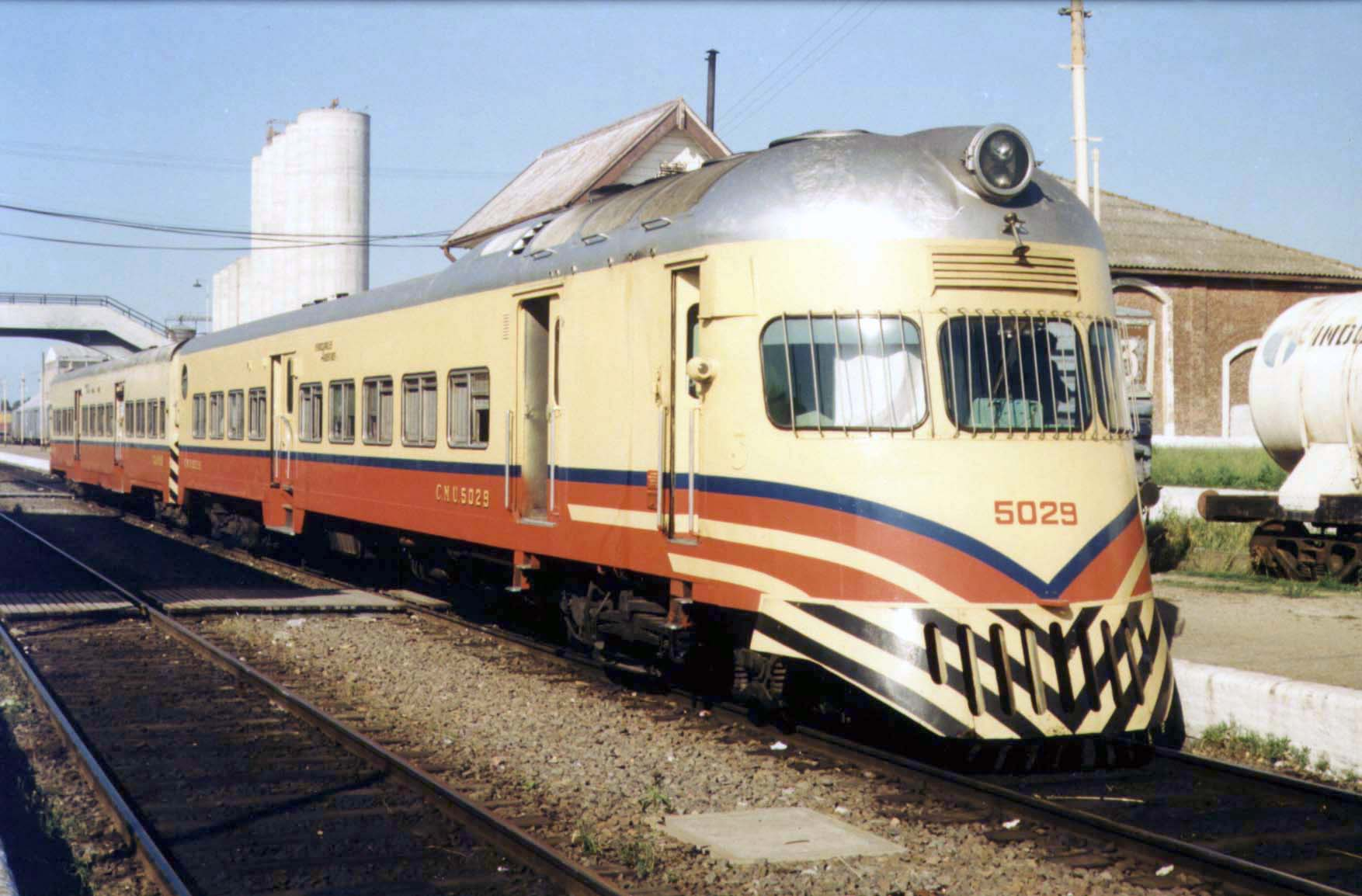
FIAT Materfer produced railcars, used for commuter rail services

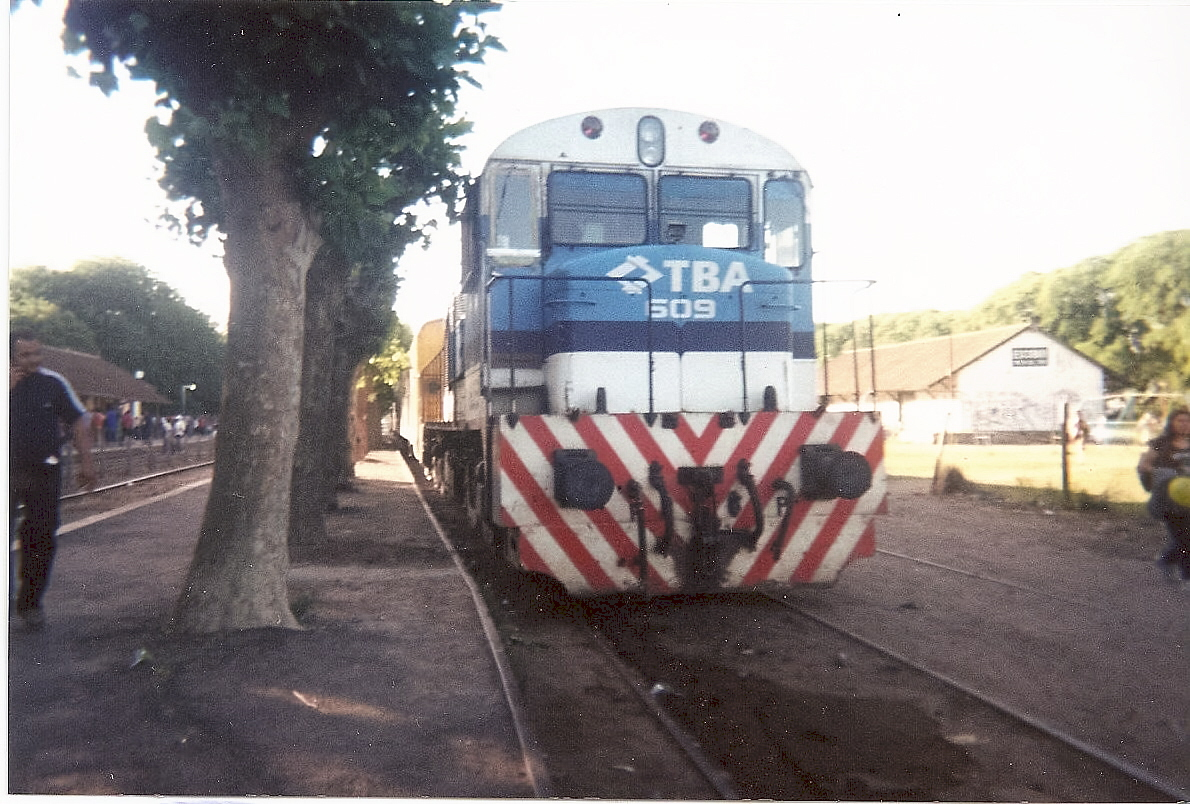
GAIA was another locomotive manufacturer

At the moment of being nationalised, most part of Argentine railways' locomotives still were steam-powered and long-distance trips were in wooden coaches. It was not until the 1950s when the Government acquired brand new diesel locomotives produced in the United States and Belgium, more specifically Cockerill-Ougree, Baldwin-Lima-Hamilton. Also, Budd Company coaches that were previously used on the canceled C&O Chessie would be used in El Marplatense, an express service from Constitución to Mar del Plata with multiple luxury services.

Despite the success of El Marplatense, FA did not acquire new material from Budd Co., Dutch company Werkspoor being the new locomotives, coaches and railcars suppliers. The Werskpoor rolling stock was used for services to Mendoza, Córdoba and Tucumán. Other companies like Ganz and Drewry being the new diesel railcars suppliers

During those years the first diesel locomotive manufactured in Argentina and produced at Liniers workshops by national company Fábrica Argentina de Locomotoras ("FAdeL") was launched in October 1951 by President Perón and its designer and builder, engineer Pedro Sacaggio. That locomotive (officially, "CM1", and named Justicialista) started to run in the summer of 1952-53 serving in El Marplatense and completing the 400-km length in only 4 hours. The CM1 was also used for services to Bariloche and Mendoza at an average speed of 90 km/h.

The second model by FADEL was the CM2 La Argentina, powered with diesel engines by Italian manufacturers FIAT Ferroviaria and Cantieri Riuniti Dell Adriático. Nevertheless, the project to produce 600 locomotives was aborted by the Revolución Libertadora that took the Government in 1955. FADEL was subsequently closed and the plan of construction dismissed.

After the closure of FADEL, Ferrocarriles Argentinos committed a company the manufacturing of 280 locomotives that would be powered with the 280 engines that had been acquired to FIAT, originally intended to be used in the FADEL machines to be built. The new manufacturer was a local Italian-Argentine consortium named "Gruppo Aziende Italiane e Argentine" (mostly known for its acronym "GAIA"). The first 80 units and their engines were totally manufactured in Italy and the remaining 200 were built in Argentina between 1964 and 1970, using mostly national components. Despite the efforts to make a reliable locomotive for the Argentine railways, the GAIA machines did not satisfy the expectations and many units would be removed from circulations, remaining only a few locomotives serving at FA.

In 1958 Sociedad Material Ferroviario ("Materfer") was established by Fiat Ferroviaria, through Fiat Concord, a consortium formed by many FIAT subsidiaries operating in Argentina. The company built a factory to manufacture rolling stock in the country to provide goods for FA.

That same year the Ministry of Transport of Argentina signed an agreement with Fiat Ferroviaria to acquire 210 brand-new railcars. Those machines were formed by 2 units powered by a FIAT diesel engine at 660 HP. The railcars could reach speeds of 115 km/h. Their low weight made them suitable to run on any railway line. The vehicles also had two driver cabins, one on each end of the car, which reduced the time of manoeuvres at termini stations, particularly in urban services.

Railcars were built in the FIAT factories of Turin, Decauville and Córdoba. Although the first railcars were manufactured in Italy and France, most of them were made in Argentina, in a factory specially designed for that assignment located in Ferreyra, Córdoba and named "Materfer". In 1962, the 7131, a railcar manufactured by FIAT Concord, made its debut in the Villa Ballester-Zárate and Victoria-Capilla del Señor sections of General Mitre Railway, then managed by Ferrocarriles Argentinos. Those light cars replaced Ganz Works railcars that had been run on those lines since 1938.

Materfer also produced coaches that looked like Werkspoor's that were used for long-distance services to Bariloche (Los Arrayanes), Tucumán (Independencia), Posadas (Cataratas), Mendoza (El Libertador) with international connections with Chile and the Expreso del Sur.

=== Imported rolling stock ===
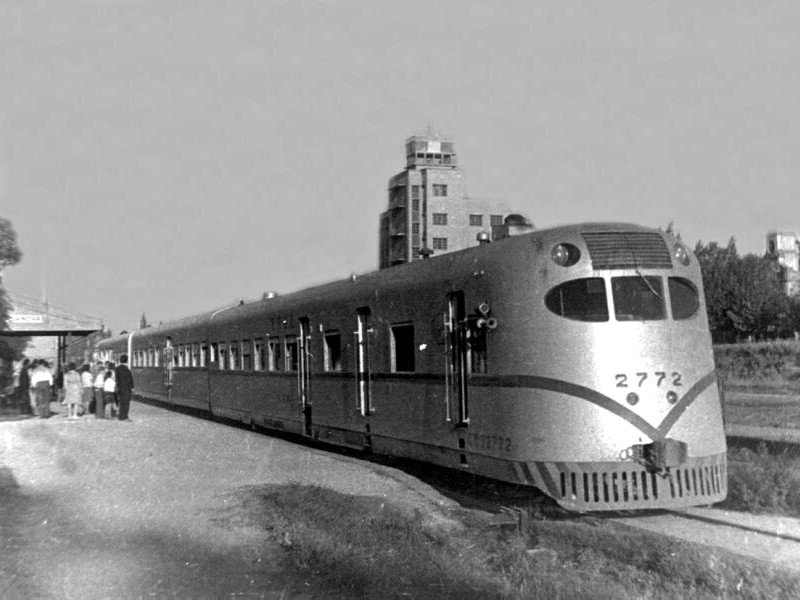
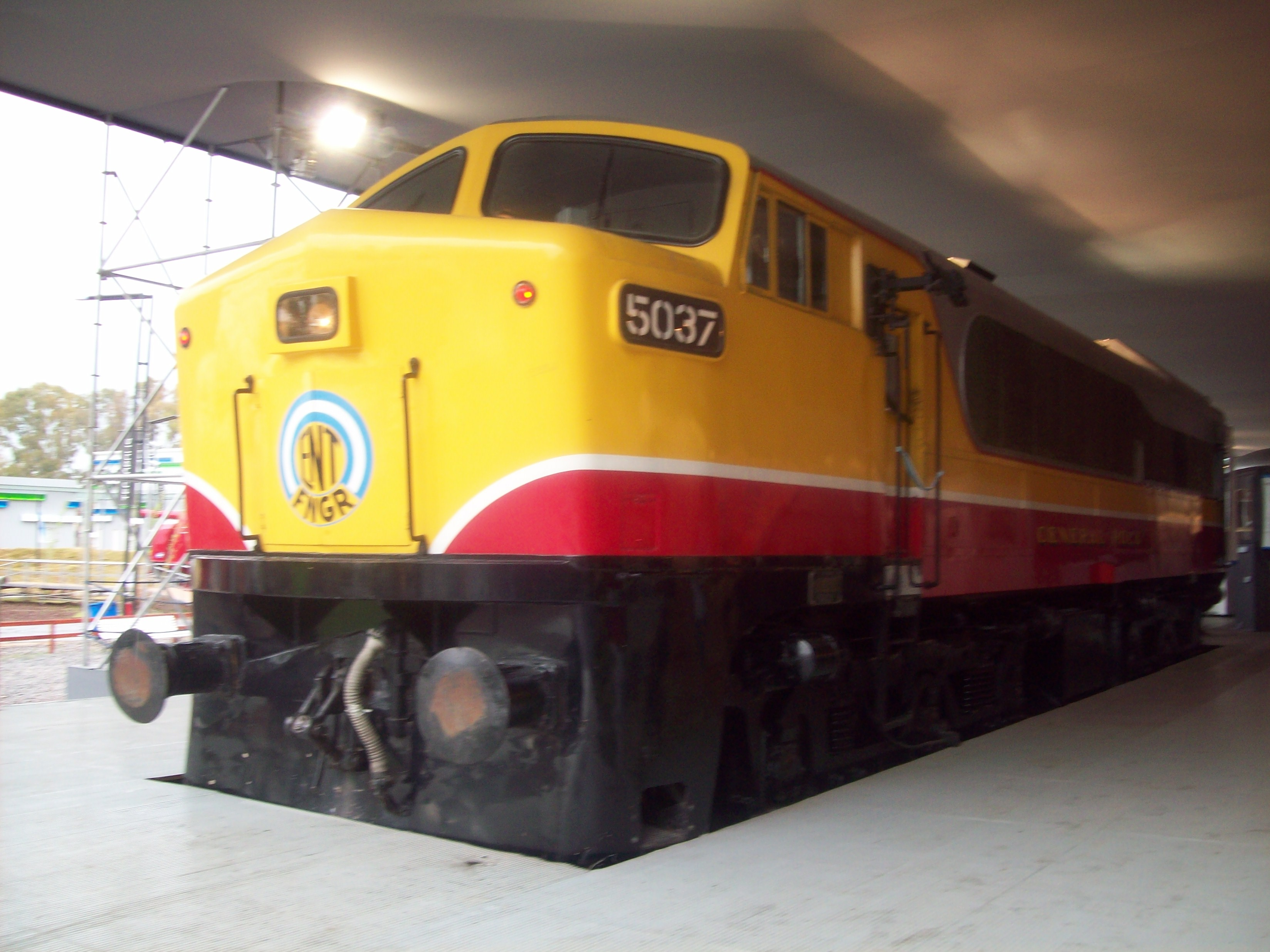
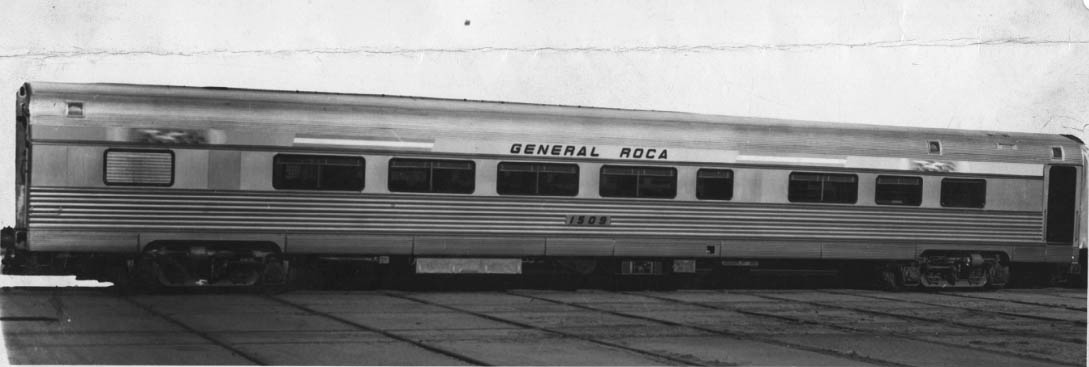
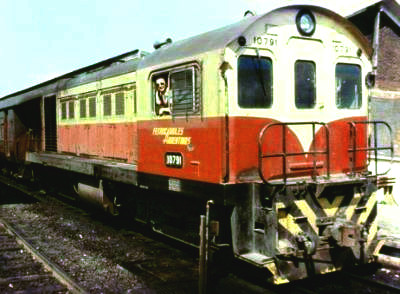
Some of the rolling stock imported in the 1950s, fltr (above): Ganz Works railcar served in Belgrano Sur Line; Baldwin-Lima-Hamilton locomotive acquired in 1953; (below): Budd Co. coaches that served the Mar del Plata line; Werkspoor locomotives acquired for the General Belgrano Railway

In 1951, the company acquired a total of 46 coaches from US manufacturer Budd Company. The rolling stock, originally built for standard gauge railways, had to be adapted to indian gauge used in Roca Railway. After a probationary period, trains began to run express services to Mar del Plata with a journey time of about 5 hours. Unlike old wooden coaches used until then, the American wagons were made of steel and came with comforts such as air conditioning and double glazing to insulate the passengers from noise, arm chairs, bars and restaurant carriage.

In 1955, 30 Werkspoor locomotives made in The Netherlands were acquired for the Belgrano Norte line. As a result, FA sent the old Ganz Works vehicles to Córdoba to serve regional railways. Four years later, a fleet of 21 English Electric locomotives arrived to replace Whitcomb and Werkspoor machines. In 1964, 27 coaches built by Aerfer, a subsidiary of FIAT Ferroviaria, were added to the line. Four years later, the fleet size was increased with the addition of 20 coaches built by local company Materfer, which replaced the old ones made in Tafí Viejo. Therefore, the English Electric locomotives worked with the Aerfer and Werkspoor coaches from then on.

In 1962, the 7131, a railcar manufactured by FIAT Concord, made its debut in the Villa Ballester-Zárate and Victoria-Capilla del Señor sections of Mitre Railway. Those light cars replaced Ganz Works railcars that had been run on those lines since 1938.

Modernisation included the purchase of brand-new diesel locomotives by American company Whitcomb in 1951 (with the addition of 15 new ones by Werkspoor in 1955) for the Belgrano Sur line. In the late 1960s and early 1970s railcars by Hungarian company Ganz Works were sent to the Belgrano Sur. They had been acquired by the Argentine State Railway decades earlier and had been running in Northern Argentine railways since 1936. Some of them were used for local services to Libertad and the rest for the long-distance service to Carhué, departing from Buenos Aires station.

At the beginning of the 1960s, FA acquired brand new Hitachi electric multiple units, equipped with air conditioning for the metropolitan section of Mitre Railway.

== Railway rationalisation: The Larkin Plan ==
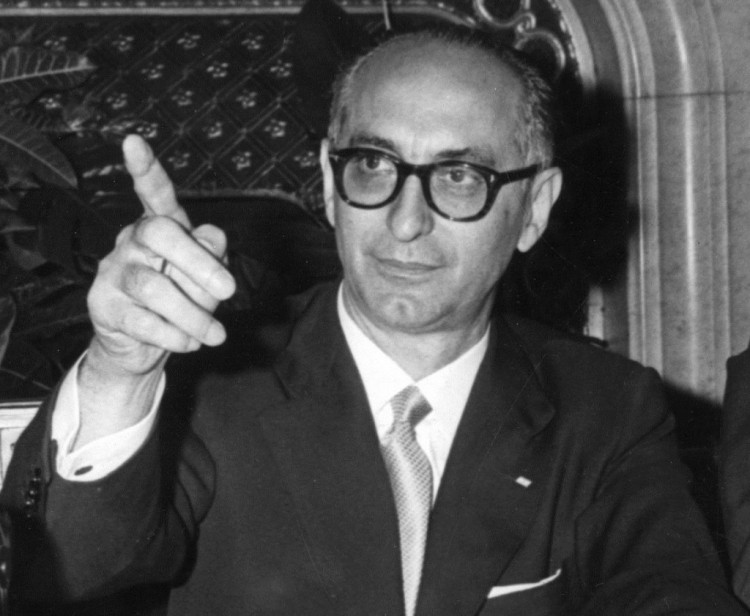
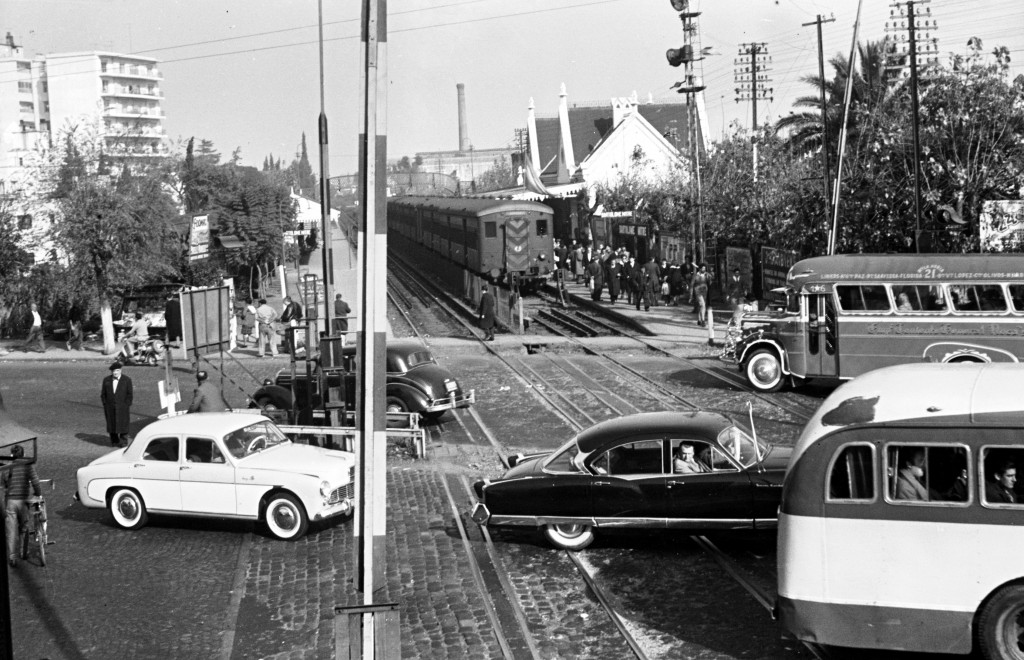
(Left): President Arturo Frondizi carried out a reduction of the railway network in the 1960s; (right): Train at Mitre station of Olivos before the branch to Delta (Tigre) was closed by the administration in 1961

By 1955 the reduction of the network was implemented through the so-called "Larkin Plan" (named because of American General Thomas B. Larkin who proposed for efficiency to reduce the Argentine redundant network to 29,000 km) several lines and branches were closed continuing during the presidency of Arturo Frondizi. As a result, by 1959 the operative railway network had decreased to 44,000 km. i.e. 4,000 km of tracks and at least 6 workshops were closed and 6,000 workers laid off. Tracks were lifted and lands and infrastructure sold. Some of the lines closed were the Belgrano Norte's Don Torcuato-Campo de Mayo branch and the B. Mitre-Delta (that would remain closed until 1995 when it was completely remodeled and re-opened as "Tren de la Costa").

Although the Larkin Plan was not completely implemented due to a strike that lasted 42 days in 1961, a high number of lines and branches were closed such as the lines between Etcheverry and Mira Pampa and Carlos Beguerie to Azul and Olavarría, together with their respective branch lines, all of them part of Province of Buenos Aires Railway. About 200,000 workers gave their support to the strike on 30 October, with several acts of rioting along the country. Frondizi's government forced workers back into work by threats of arrest and imprisonment by military courts.

== De Marchi era: 1968–71 ==
After the coup d'état that overthrew president Arturo Illia, General Juan Carlos De Marchi was named president of Ferrocarriles Argentinos. Marchi carried out a plan of modernisation and investments for the railway network that included to invest US$850 million within five years. During Marchi's administration the rolling stock was renewed, acquiring EMD GT22 and G22 diesel locomotives from the US and units by Materfer manufactured in Córdoba. The EMD locomotives have been running on several railway lines of Argentina until today, such as Belgrano Norte and Belgrano Sur metropolitan services, Roca and Mitre railways long-distance services among others. In 1968 De Marchi was elected secretary of the Latin America Railway Association. In the early 1970s, FA acquired 128 electric units to Japanese consortium Marubeni to be used in Urquiza Railway metropolitan services. The units ran for the first time in 1974, replacing old American-made trams that had been used until then.

Nevertheless, some railways were closed during those years, such as Ferrocarril Económico Correntino in 1969.

== Decline ==
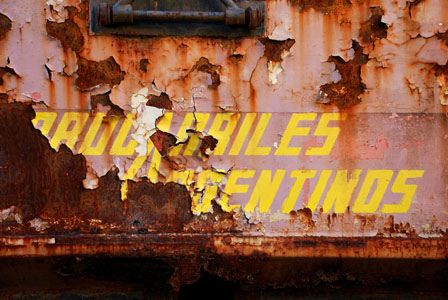
Deteriorated rolling stock due to lack of mainteneance at the workshops of Santa Fe

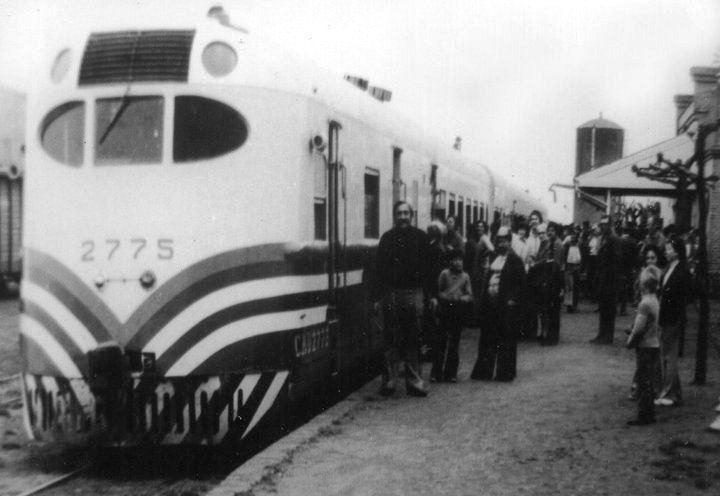
Last service to Carhué, 1977. Several lines were closed by the military dictatorship

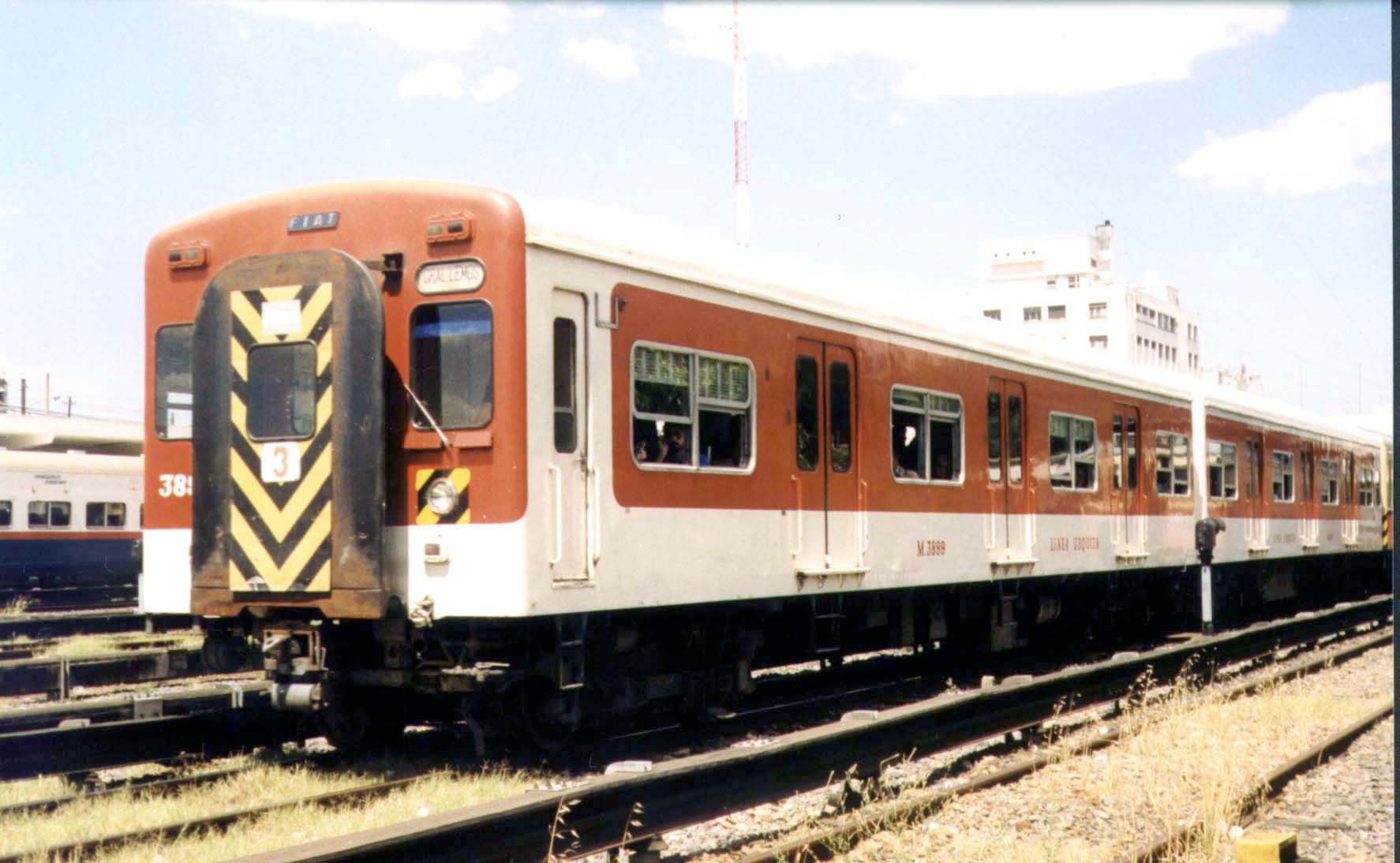
Toshiba electric units acquired in the 1960s, still in use in the 1990s

By 1976, 3,000 km had been suppressed from the Argentine network, with a total extension of 41,400 km. That same year the military dictatorship led by Jorge Videla overthrew president Isabel Perón beginning the National Reorganization Process. During those years, another 6,300 km would be closed, apart from eliminating half of the passenger services and firing 40% of railway workers (the number of employees dropped from 156,000 to 96,000). The railway network went from 41,400 km to 31,110 in 1980, which resulted in the closure of a thousand stations out of a total of 2,400.

"To shrink the State is to enlarge the Nation"

— José A. Martínez de Hoz, Ministry of Economy during the National Reorganization Process in Argentina

Some of the railway lines closed and dismantled during that period were Comodoro Rivadavia, Puerto Deseado and lines from Carlos Beguerie to Mira Pampa (1974) and La Plata to Avellaneda (1977) of Province of Buenos Aires railways.

After the rationalisation, the total extension of each railway division was as follows:

Division	Extension (km)
Sarmiento	4,058
Mitre	5,490
Roca	6,827
San Martín	4,523
Urquiza	2,741
Belgrano	10,474

Raúl Alfonsín's democratic administration sought to keep the services active, but the critical economic situation inherited from the National Reorganization Process's policies drove FA into recession. One of the achievements during Alfonsín's government was the electrification of Roca suburban branches from Constitución to Ezeiza and Glew. In addition, the entire fleet of trains was renewed, acquiring EMU by Japanese companies Nippon Sharyo, Kinki Sharyo, Tokyu Car, Kawasaki and Hitachi. The electrified rail system was opened to public in November, 1985. After electrification, the number of passengers carried increased considerably.

== Break-up and privatisation ==
=== Background ===
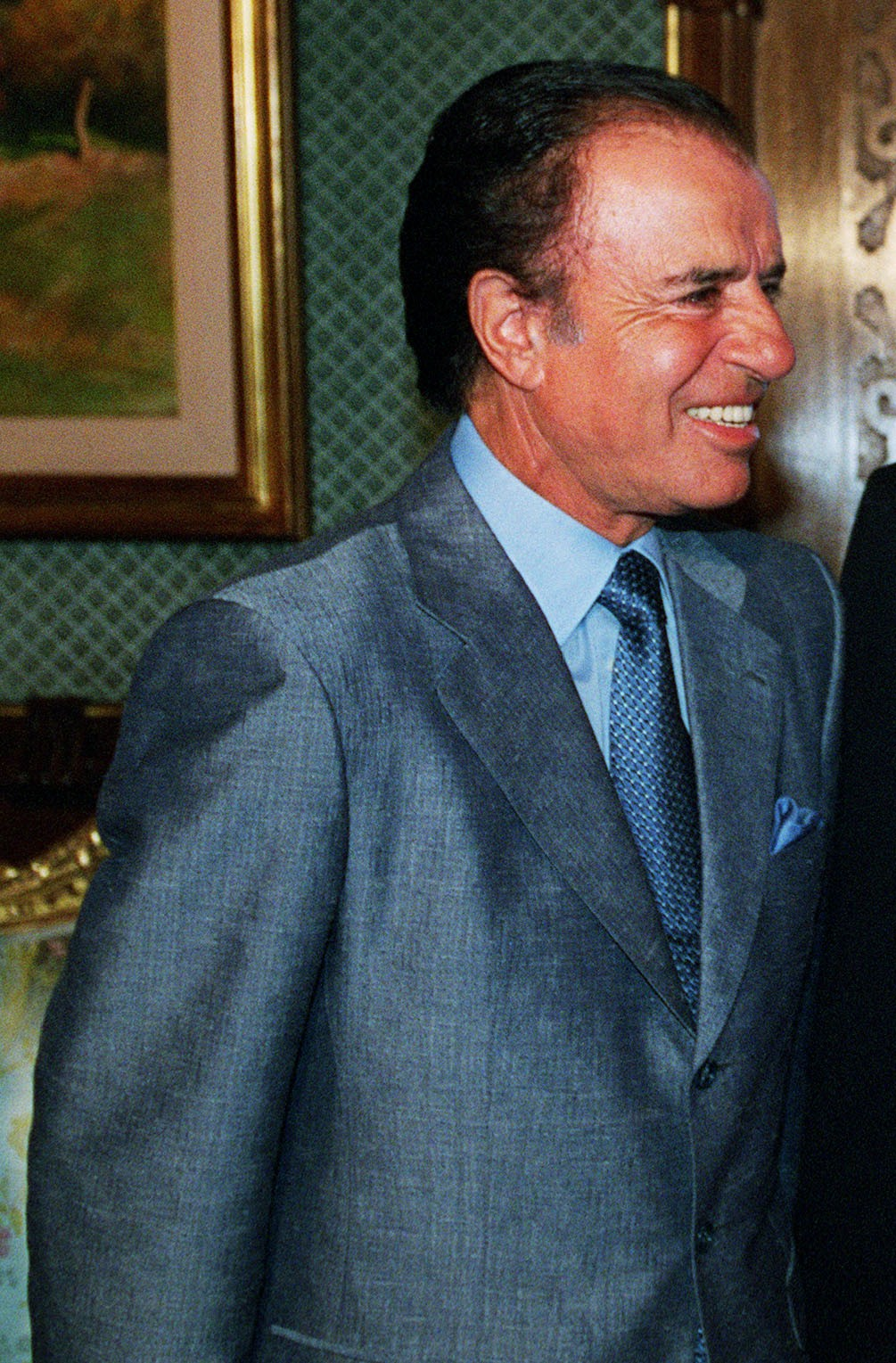
Under the Carlos Menem's administration FA was closed and all services privatised

Following a prolonged period of hyperinflation in the 1980s, accompanied by a steep increase in fiscal deficit and a sharp fall in reserves, the Argentine government, under the presidency of Carlos Menem from 1989, initiated a series of neoliberal reforms which included the privatisation of public utility companies (telephones, gas, electricity and water) together with the entire railway network.

The plan was to break up the network into segments and to grant concessions to private companies for their operation through competitive bidding. Freight and passenger services were separated and, since most of the intercity passenger services were not commercially attractive to the private sector, the government offered these to the provinces. The remaining passenger services in the city of Buenos Aires, including the five lines of the Metro, were potentially more viable and were treated separately.

=== Metropolitan services ===
By Decree 520/91, a new state-owned company, Ferrocarriles Metropolitanos S.A. (FEMESA) was created in 1991 to operate metropolitan services in the city and suburbs of Buenos Aires Province until the privatisation process was carried out, effectively breaking them from the national network. From then on, Ferrocarriles Argentinos only operated freight and long-distance passenger services until their concession to private companies.

Projects not only included Buenos Aires but cities of Córdoba, Rosario and Mendoza with the idea of establishing urban services that included rapid transit transport. In the case of Córdoba, the plan foresaw to unify the two stations in the city and to connect Ferreyra and Argüello districts. The project for Mendoza foresaw to build a new terminal near the El Plumerillo Airport. Nevertheless, the plans were never carried out.

=== Freight trains ===
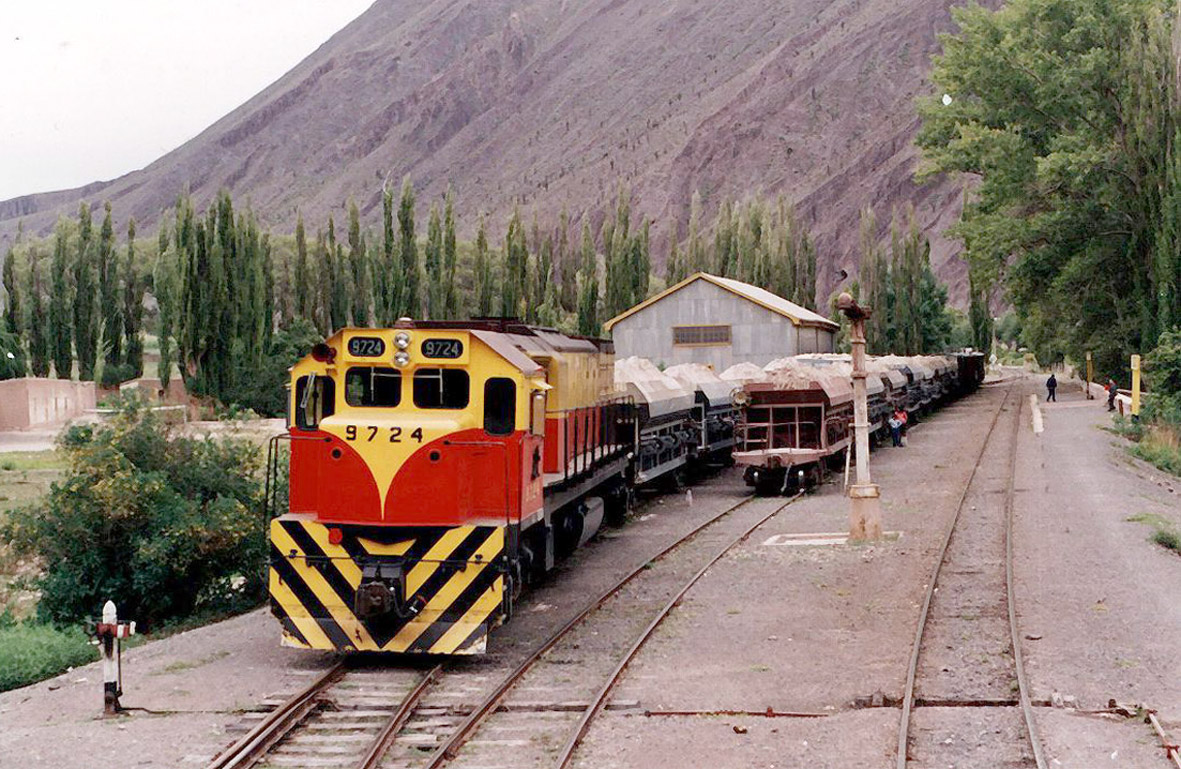
Freight train in Ingeniero Mauri, 1993

Privatisation began with the granting of long-term concessions (30 years with an optional 10-year extension) to six companies for the operation of freight services. These companies were responsible for all operations and maintenance and for the implementation of the investment programme detailed in their bid. The fixed assets remained the property of the state and the operators had to pay for their use and to rent rolling stock. Freight tariffs were deregulated but were subject to state approval. The concessionaires were expected to hire as many FA employees as were required and redundancies were financed by the government with the help of the World Bank.

Initially no bids were received for the Belgrano railway, and in October 1993 the government created a new state-owned corporation to continue its operation and to undertake improvements likely to make it a more attractive commercial proposition for a private buyer. Privatisation followed six years later when Belgrano Cargas took over the line.

=== Long-distance services closure ===
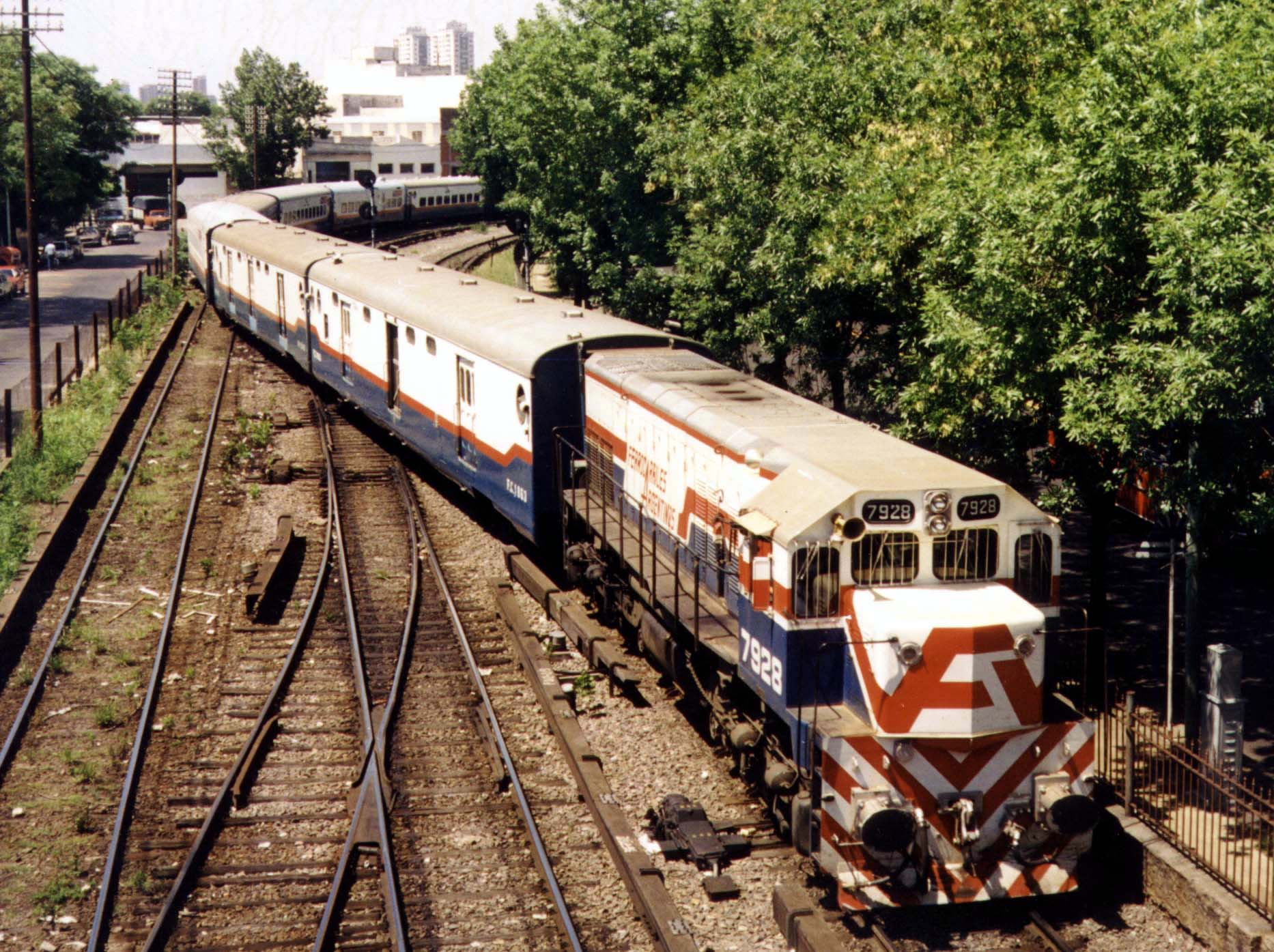
The Gran Capitán, long-distance service to Misiones province, circa 1990

Following the failure of previous rationalisation efforts to curb Ferrocarriles Argentinos' financial deficit, on 10 July 1992 president Menem signed Decree 1168/92, introducing an emergency diagram for long-distance services across the country as an intermediate step to facilitate the privatisation process, beginning on 1 August and effectively setting 31 December 1992 as the expiration date for all passenger operations. Luxury services were eliminated, frequencies were sharply reduced and most comforts done away with, causing a further drop in quality.

In December, Menem granted a final extension until 10 March 1993, when all long-distance passenger services were definitely cancelled, stripping most of the provinces of their rail links with Buenos Aires. Such was the case of Mendoza, Salta, Jujuy, Entre Ríos, Corrientes, Misiones, Mendoza, San Juan, San Luis, Catamarca and La Rioja.

The closure left many villages isolated from the main cities of Argentina, causing younger inhabitants to depart from their hometowns in search of better opportunities. This happened in cities such as La Banda, Laguna Paiva, San Cristóbal, Navarro, Las Marianas among many others. While in 1960 trains had carried 539 million of passengers, thirty years after the number decreased to 264 million. Between 1991 and 1992 urban and intercity services were cancelled due to lack of locomotives to run. In San Martín and Roca lines trains had only two coaches in poor conditions. In addition, railway unions made sudden strikes that left passengers abandoned midway. During the last year of state administration there were 239,000 services cancelled or delayed.

Before the closure, the National government had offered the provinces the possibility of reactivating intercity railway lines at their own expense. Few provinces expressed interest and even fewer did reach an agreement with the central government to resume services, among which were Buenos Aires (establishing its own company, Ferrobaires), Tucumán (with Tucumán Ferrocarriles running trains since 1997), Río Negro (Servicios Ferroviarios Patagónico, still operating), Córdoba, La Pampa (also with services by Ferrobaires) and Chubut. Likewise, the government also transferred jurisdiction over some branches to the provinces, such as Viedma-Bariloche and Ingeniero Jacobbaci-Esquel to Río Negro and Chubut (as the railway crossed both provinces); Córdoba-Cruz del Eje to Córdoba Province. Salta received the Tren a las Nubes and Mendoza took over Transandine Railway. In all the cases, the procedures were ruled by Law n° 2.873.

== Winding-up ==
On 7 July 1995 the company was declared into a state of liquidation by decree n° 1039/95, ceasing operations that same day.

After FA disappeared, the railway infrastructure of Argentina was taken over by a new agency, "Ente Nacional de Administración de Bienes Ferroviarios" (in English: National Board of Railway Properties Management - ENABIEF), then renamed "Organismo Nacional de Administración de Bienes del Estado" (National Agency of State Properties Management - ONABE) until 2008 when the "Administración de Infraestructuras Ferroviarias S.E." (Railway Infrastructure Management - ADIFSE) replaced ONABE as administrator. ADIFSE's headquarters set up in the former FA building in Avenida del Libertador and Av. Ramos Mejía in Retiro, Buenos Aires.

== Revival ==
In 2008, the national government created Operadora Ferroviaria Sociedad del Estado (SOFSE) in order to manage some of its newly acquired railway assets. The state-owned company quickly began to grow, incorporating newly re-nationalised lines, purchasing new rolling stock and replacing long track segments. In 2015, with the state increasingly widening the scope of its railway reformation, it began re-using the old Ferrocarriles Argentinos marque and soon after presented a proposal to the Argentine National Congress whereby the brand would be revived, incorporating SOFSE and potentially other companies which have yet to be re-nationalised. This proposal was passed by overwhelming majority in April 2015 and made law by the Argentine Senate, effectively re-nationalising the country's railways, a move which saw support from all major political parties across the political spectrum.
