= Domingo Faustino Sarmiento Railway =

Railway company in Argentina

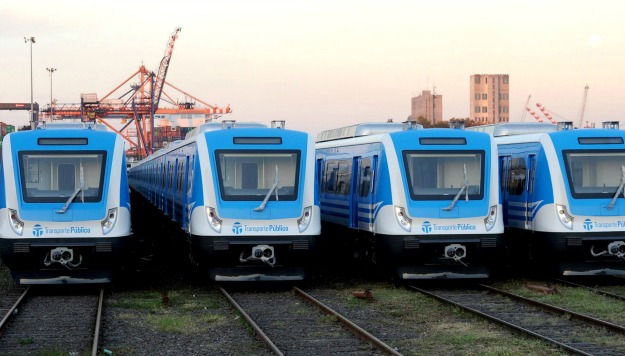
- Current rolling stock of the commuter rail line.

Overview
- Native name: Ferrocarril Sarmiento
- Status: Active
- Owner: Government of Argentina
- Locale: Buenos Aires; La Pampa; San Luis; Mendoza
- Termini: Once; Toay

Service
- Type: Inter-city
- Operator(s): Trenes Argentinos (passengers); Ferroexpreso Pampeano (freight)

History
- Opened: 1948; 78 years ago

Technical
- Track gauge: 1,676 mm (5 ft 6 in)
Route map
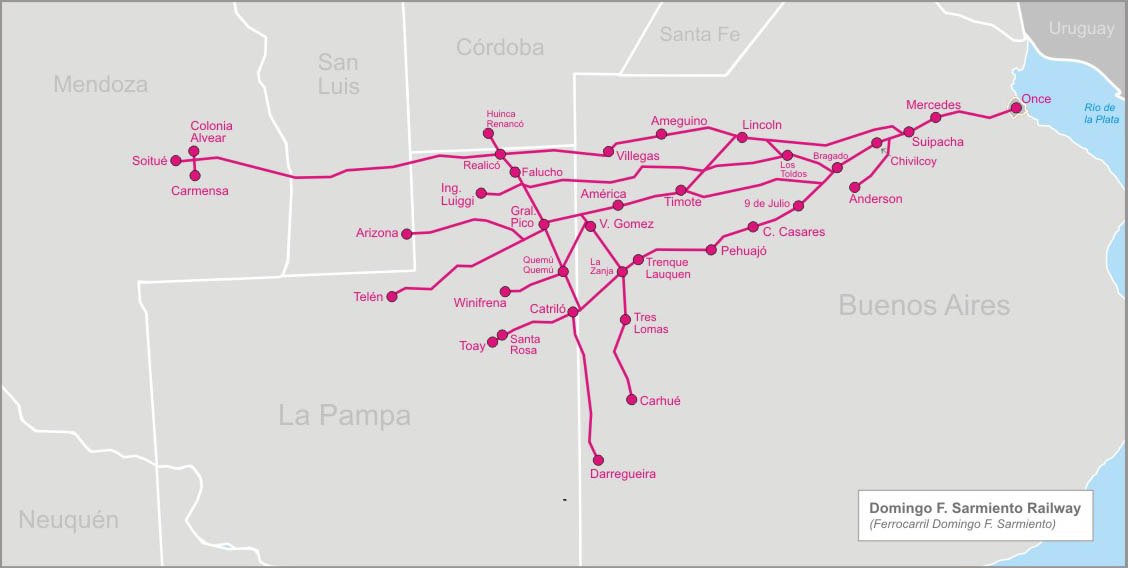

The Domingo Faustino Sarmiento Railway (FCDFS) (Spanish: Ferrocarril Domingo Faustino Sarmiento), named after the former Argentine president, statesman, educator, and author Domingo Faustino Sarmiento, is one of the six state-owned Argentine railway divisions formed after President Juan Perón's nationalisation of the Argentine railway network in 1948. The six companies were managed by Ferrocarriles Argentinos which was later broken up during the process of railway privatisation beginning in 1991 during Carlos Menem's presidency.

The principal lines departed from Once railway station in Buenos Aires to the west through the provinces of Buenos Aires, La Pampa, Córdoba, San Luis and Mendoza.

The railway was created after the nationalization of 5 ft 6 in (1,676 mm) broad gauge lines on the British-owned company Buenos Aires Western Railway on 13 February 1947. The state-owned company created with the nationalization, Ferrocarriles Argentinos took over all the English and French railway lines.

When Ferrocarriles Argentinos was dissolved and the long-distance services closed by the government of Argentina (with Carlos Menem as president), the freight lines of the FC Sarmiento were given in concession to Ferroexpreso Pampeano. On the other hand, some passenger services were taken over by Ferrobaires, a state-owned company established by the government of Buenos Aires Province.

The urban and suburban services were operated by transitional company FEMESA until they were given in concession to local private company Trenes de Buenos Aires (TBA), which was widely criticized due to the poor conditions of its services. After the rail disaster of 2012, the government revoked its contract with TBA and the services were taken over by a newly created state-owned company, SOFSE, which later renewed the urban parts of the network with new rolling stock and infrastructure.

The interurban service of Ferrocarril Sarmiento is second in number of passengers after Ferrocarril General Roca.

== History ==
=== Background ===
The Ferrocarril Sarmiento was the successor of Buenos Aires Western Railway, a company founded by a group of porteño people from the "Sociedad del Camino de Hierro de Buenos Aires al Oeste". Initially a State company, this railway had been the first of Argentina, inaugurated on 29 August 1857. During its first years the service covered a 10 km path from the Plaza Del Parque station (where the Teatro Colón is located nowadays) to La Floresta, then part of San José de Flores Partido. The railway expanded its service to the most productive zones of Buenos Aires Province. During this period, the BAWR's main rival was the Buenos Aires Great Southern Railway so both companies were involved in a hard competition to extend their rails to the southwest territory of Buenos Aires.

In 1887 the Argentine state and provincial governments sold all the public companies, with the argument "The State is the worst administrator" (according to then president Miguel Juárez Celman's speech). Therefore, the BAWR was sold to British company "The Buenos Aires Western Railway Limited", mostly known for its Spanish form "Ferrocarril del Oeste". Once it was given to the British, the railway continued expanding along the country, reaching the La Pampa, San Luis and Mendoza Provinces. By 1914 the line extended to the Andes but the beginning of World War I frustrated the plans to cross to neighborhood Republic of Chile.

After a brief period of prosperity during the decade of 1920, the situation becomes critical with the 1929 crash and the economic depression. By 1945 the British and French companies were seriously affected by the World War II, beginning contacts with the Government of Argentina to sell their railway lines that still operated in the country. As a result, the railway assets were acquired by the State of Argentina between 1 November 1947 and 1 March 1948. President Juan Domingo Perón signed the agreement whereby the government took over all the railway line.

That same year, a decree by the presidency stated that the railway lines would be named with names of national heroes or notable people of Argentina. The Ferrocarril del Oeste received the name "Domingo Faustino Sarmiento", honoring the memory of educator and former President of Argentina born in San Juan Province (one of the regions served by the railway). The branch Darragueira-Huinca Renancó of Bahía Blanca and North Western Railway, that had been administrated by the Great Western Railway) was also added to the FC Sarmiento.

=== Branch Caballito-Puerto Madero ===
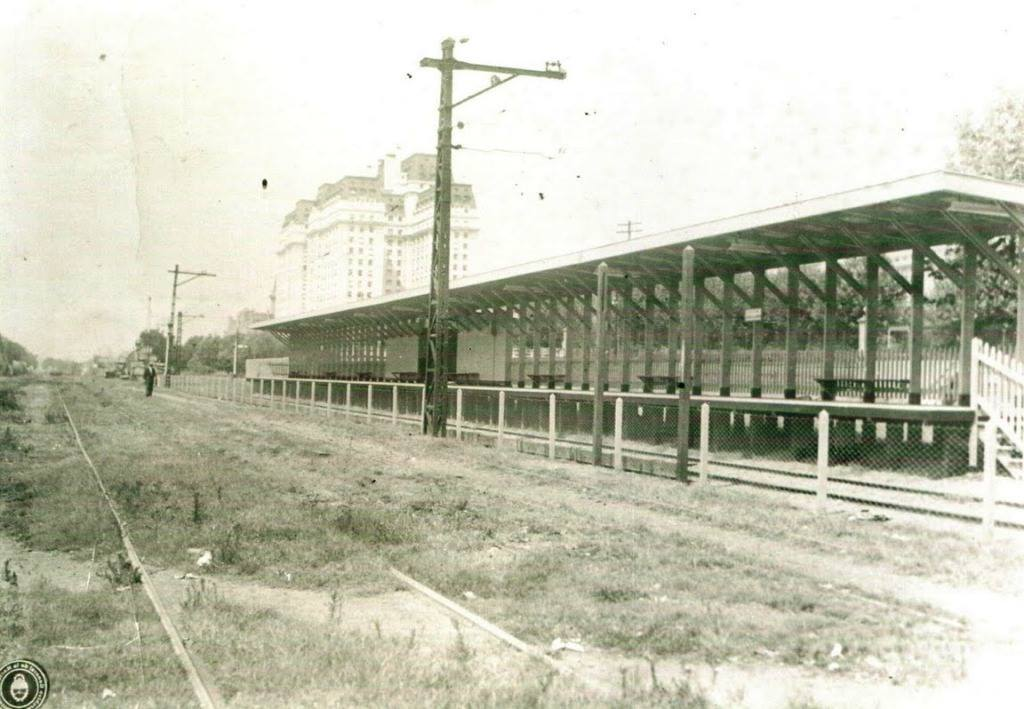
1 de Marzo station in Puerto Madero

On 3 March 1949, a new service was opened on the initiative of Secretary of Transport Juan Castro. It was run through a tunnel by wooden-bodied coaches between Caballito and the recently inaugurated "1° de Marzo" station, located on the crossing of the Buenos Aires Port railway and Cangallo street, in Puerto Madero.

There were four daily services every 40 minutes. The length of the branch was 7.5 km with no stations between terminus, that allowed trains to run at 30 km/h. The most part of the voyage was underground. Finally, this branch was closed on 1 January 1951 due to the very few number of passengers transported. The causes of the lack of passengers were the few daily services and the risk of accidents although the most important reason for the closure was the Line A of Buenos Aires Underground that offered a similar service but adding the possibility to combine with other services such as the branch to Moreno in Once de Septiembre station.

=== Branche closures ===
In 1951 the Liniers-Ingeniero Brian freight branch was definitely closed. The Perito Moreno Highway would be later built over the tracks. Other branches closed were Villa Luro-Versalles (on 5 October 1952) and the "Basílica de Luján"

=== Advances ===
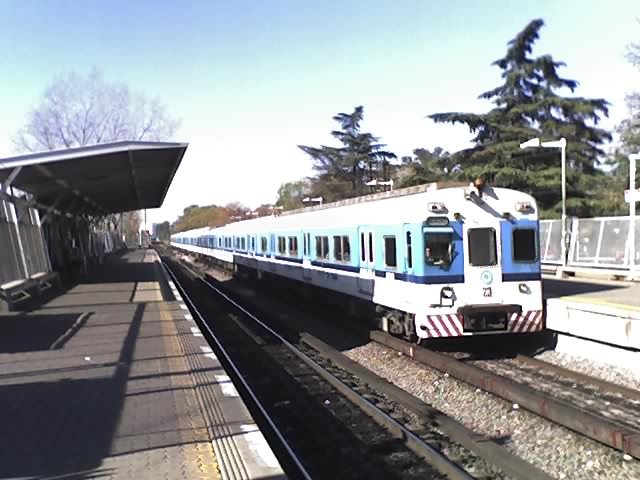
Toshiba units ran for over 50 years

In 1953 the first electronic warning devices were installed on the Boyacá street level crossing of Flores district, having been the first in Argentina. In 1955 the works to improve the Once de Septiembre station began. One year later a new railway signalling system was installed on the Once-Moreno branch.

On 30 June 1956, the first coaches by Toshiba made their debut on the rail. The works on Once took a long time, having finished in 1972. Three years later the Floresta station (the first terminus of the railway) was also remodeled.

During the 80s the Government of Argentina reorganized the railway system of Greater Buenos Aires railway system, creating the "Línea Metropolitana", formed by the respective suburban rail lines. This lasted only five years, having been dissolved before the end of the decade.

== Sarmiento tunneling ==
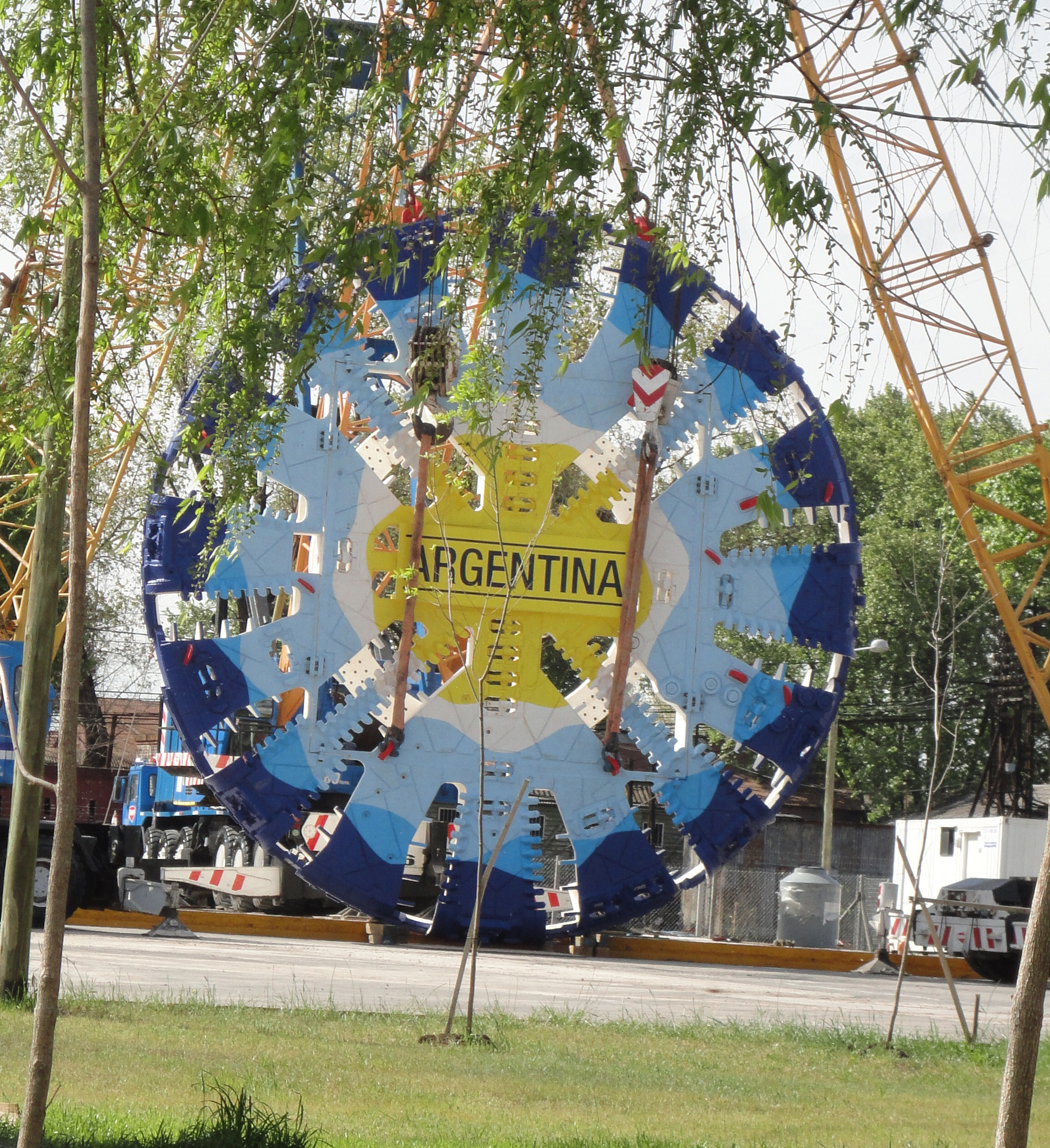
Head of the drilling machine "Argentina", brought to the country to build the underground route of the line

The performance of the Sarmiento line was to be greatly improved by drilling a new tunnel. Under plans announced in 2006, a 33 km tunnel would be bored between Moreno and Caballito in order to replace the surface alignment of the Sarmiento commuter route. According to the Minister of the Interior and Transport, the first stage was to cost 11·5bn pesos, removing many level crossings which would "avoid many accidents and much loss of life". The new underground alignment would increase the service frequency to every three minutes, increasing capacity from 100 million to 280 million passenger-journeys a year. The tunnel segment was to have 13 underground stations. Drilling took place for a few months in 2012, was suspended, resumed in 2016, had at Villa Lugo on 25 February 2019 the hole-through and was suspended again few months later in July due to lack of funds. As of January 2020 the government was studying its options regarding contract cancellation. During the construction, service on the surface line was continuing. On 18 August 2025 the government announced the final stoppage of the whole project and the closing of the already done tunnel with a length of about 7 kilometres.

== Train services ==
=== Metropolitan area ===
- Once – Moreno
- Moreno – Mercedes
- Merlo – Lobos

=== Long distance ===
- Once – Pehuajó
