= Juancho railway station =

Former railway station in Buenos Aires, Argentina

Juancho
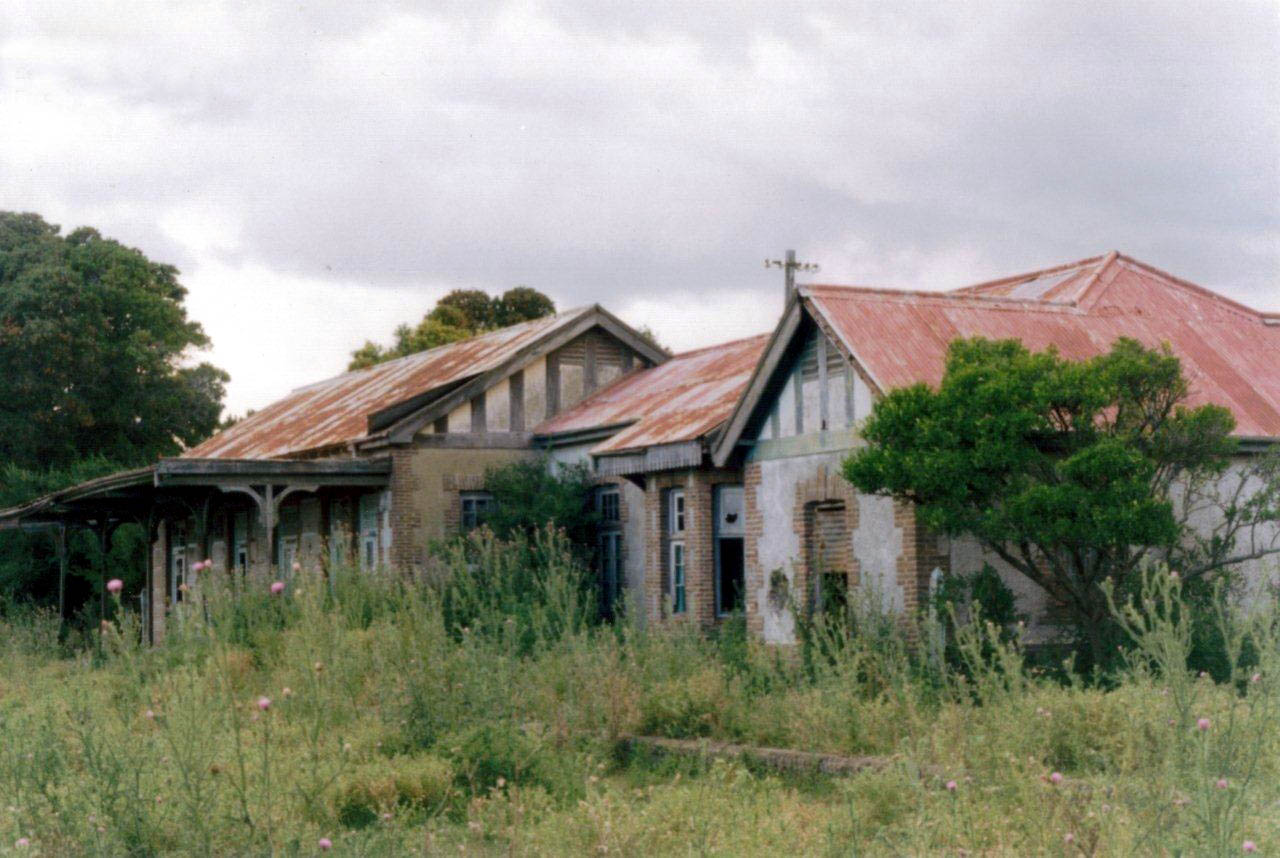
- The abandoned station in 1995

General information
- Location: Argentina
- Coordinates: 37.1532°S 57.0844°W
- System: Inter-city
- Owner: Government of Argentina
- Operator: BA Great Southern (1908–1948); Ferrocarriles Argentinos (1948–1978)
- Line: FC Roca
- Platforms: 1
- Tracks: 1

Construction
- Parking: No
- Cycle facilities: No
- Accessible: No

History
- Opened: 1908
- Closed: 1978; 48 years ago
Location

Juancho is a former railway station and current museum located in the General Madariaga Partido of Buenos Aires Province. The station was originally built by British-owned Buenos Aires Great Southern Railway in 1908, helping tourists reach the cities on the Atlantic coast such as Ostende, the first town established in region currently known as Pinamar Partido, and then Villa Gesell.

After the nationalization process carried out by the Juan Perón's administration in 1948, the station became part of the General Roca Railway, managed by state-owned Ferrocarriles Argentinos.

== History ==
The origins of the station can be traced to 1904 when the BAGSR built the line that connected Buenos Aires with Mar del Plata. Despite the progress of railway in the province of Buenos Aires, livestock producers from regions close to the Atlantic coast had to travel long distances to Maipú or other stations to transport their goods. One of those farmers, Benjamín Zubiaurre, sold part of his lands to allow BAGSR to build a branch from the line to Mar del Plata in order to make distances shorter.

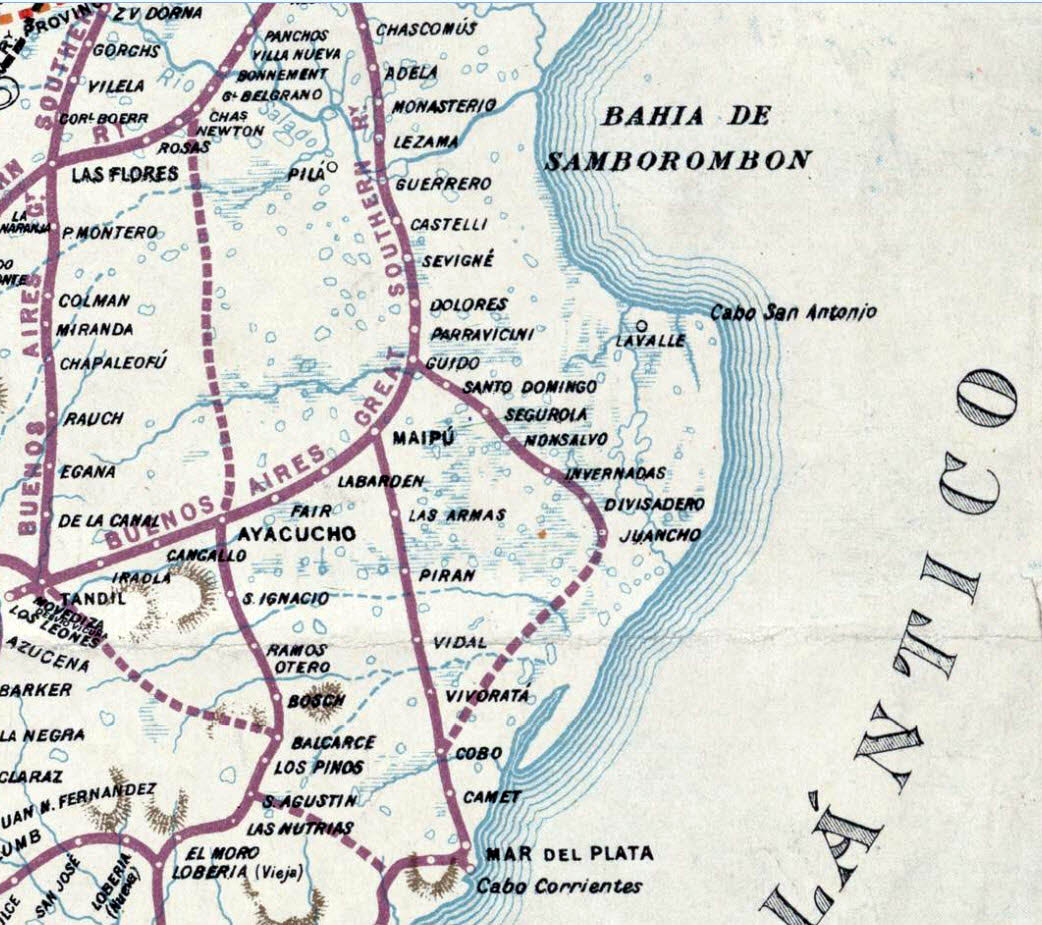
Map of the BAGSR line showing the Gral. Guido–Juancho branch (to the east). The project to extend the section to Cobo is depicted in dotted line. This extension would be carried out but to Vivoratá instead of Cobo

The company responded the demands and constructed a new branch from General Guido (on the main line to Mar del Plata) to the east, and a new station named "Divisadero" (today, General Juan Madariaga). The branch then extended to Juancho station, inaugurated in 1908. (Note: The exact date of opening of the station is unclear. Some sources indicate that it was inaugurated on 7 November 1907, while others state it was opened in 1908.) The station became terminus of the branch, with five intermediate stops (Santo Domingo, Segurola, Monsalvo, Invernadas, and Divisadero). Besides, Juancho was located only 24 km to the beach, being (with the exception of Mar del Plata) the station located closest to a beach in the entire Argentine network, which caused most of the passengers travelled to the expanding city of Ostende. Entrepreneurs, workers, and tourists, were frequent users of the line. They were carried from Juancho in horse-drawn carriages to Ostende, where they boarded a Decauville small train that took them to the beach.

In 1912 the branch was extended from Juancho to Vivoratá (also on the main line to Mar del Plata), as an alternate path to reach the coast city. Intermediate stops were Macedo, Calfucurá, and Nahuel Rucá. In 1931, another entrepreneur, Carlos Gesell, established in the village then known as "Villa Gesell", also travelling via Juancho.

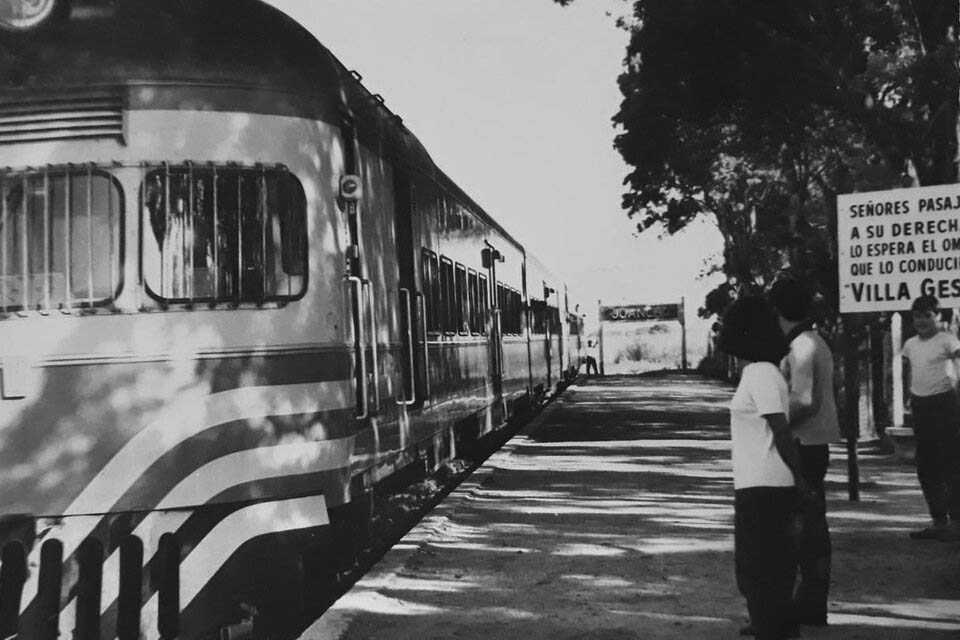
A Fiat 7131 railcar at Juancho station in 1966

Between 1912 and the 1960s the Guido–Juancho–Vivoratá branch was served by freight trains mainly, although the line included some passenger services. In 1949, a new branch was built by state-owned Ferrocarriles Argentinos from General Madariaga to the city of Pinamar including a new station, placed where today stays a park, on Av. Constitución e/ Apolo y Av. Intemedanos.

that would be the only railway line (besides the Constitución–Mar del Plata) with services to any city on the Atlantic coast. The Pinamar railway stat

In 1996, the municipal ordinance no. 857/96 declared Juancho station "historical monument and heritage of Madariaga's culture and history". Nowadays the former station building operates as a railway museum, inaugurated in July 2022.

=== Historic operators ===
Company	Period
(United Kingdom) Buenos Aires Great Southern	1908–1948
(Argentina) Ferrocarriles Argentinos	1948–1978
