= Pinamar railway station (1949) =

Former railway station in Pinamar, Argentina

Pinamar
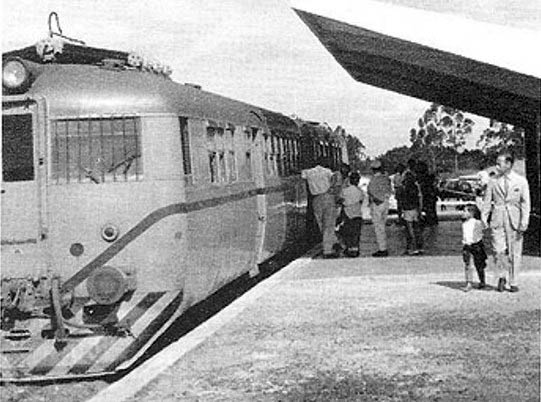
- Pinamar station with a Drewry railcar stopped at it

General information
- Location: Av. Constitución e/ Apolo y Av. Intemedanos, Pinamar; Argentina
- Owner: Government of Argentina
- Operator: Ferrocarriles Argentinos
- Line: Roca
- Platforms: 1
- Tracks: 1

History
- Opened: 1949
- Closed: December 18, 1967; 58 years ago
Location

Pinamar was a railway station in the homonymous city of Buenos Aires Province, Argentina. Operated by recently created Ferrocarriles Argentinos, the station was opened in 1949 as an extension of the General Guido – General Madariaga branch of General Roca Railway, transporting tourist to the city of Pinamar mostly during Summer.

The station lasted 18 years until it was closed in December 1967. In 1996, a new station (Divisadero de Pinamar) was built more distant from the original station. After the service was interrupted during some periods of time, Divisadero de Pinamar was re-opened in January 2021.

== History ==
By 1904 the Buenos Aires Great Southern Railway connected Constitución (Buenos Aires) with Mar del Plata through a line from north to south that has stops in Chascomús, Maipú, among others.

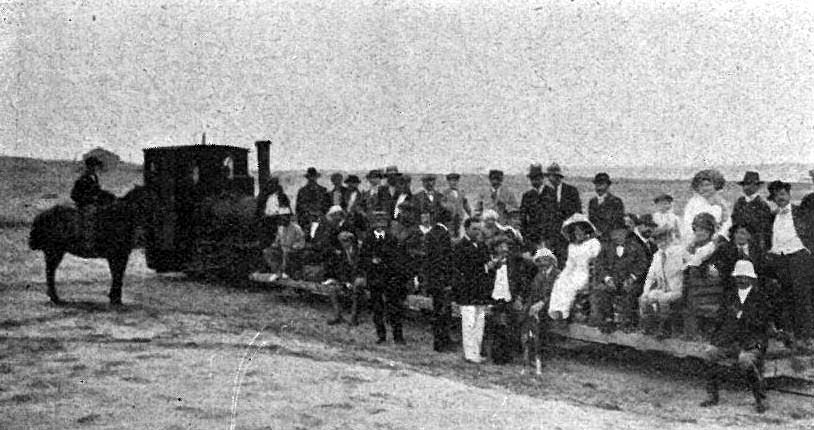
Starting in 1913, the Decauville railroad of Ostende was a predecessor of the future train to Pinamar

Nevertheless, the agricultural producers that lived next to the Atlantic coast were forced to make long trips driving their cattle to the BAGSR stations so there was not any railway line that ran next to the coast. For that reason they requested the BAGSR to build a branch so they could commercialise their goods avoiding so long trips. Furthermore, one of those producers sold part of his lands to the company could build there the "Divisadero" station (today, General Madariaga), located on the km 71,68 of the branch from General Guido.

That branch built from Gral. Guido reached Juancho on November 7, 1907. By 1912 the tracks were extended to Vivoratá (with three intermediate stations built), where it connected with the main line Constituación – Mar del Plata, making it an alternative way for trains between both points in case there was a problem on the main path.

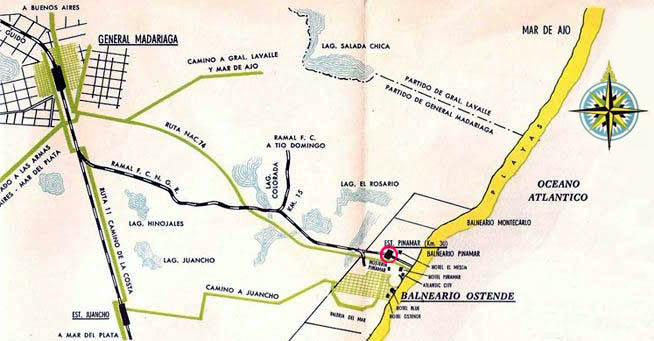
Map showing the branch from Gral. Madariaga to Pinamar station (in red circle) when it was still active (1949–67)

In 1913 a group of Belgian entrepreneurs inaugurated Ostende, a village in the coast built on a land they had bought to the Guerrero family. To go to Ostende, passengers went by train to Juancho, then being transported by horse-drawn carriages to "Colonia Tokio" where they took a narrow-gauge railway (Decauville) to Ostende. On economic grounds, the coming of the train helped the zone to increase its production. Apart from cattle, producers commercialised apples and firewood, for which some small branches were built. One of those branches reached the point where the intersection of RP 11 and RP 74 is placed today, very close to the entrance to Pinamar. Nevertheless, most of those branches would be lifted in the 1940s.

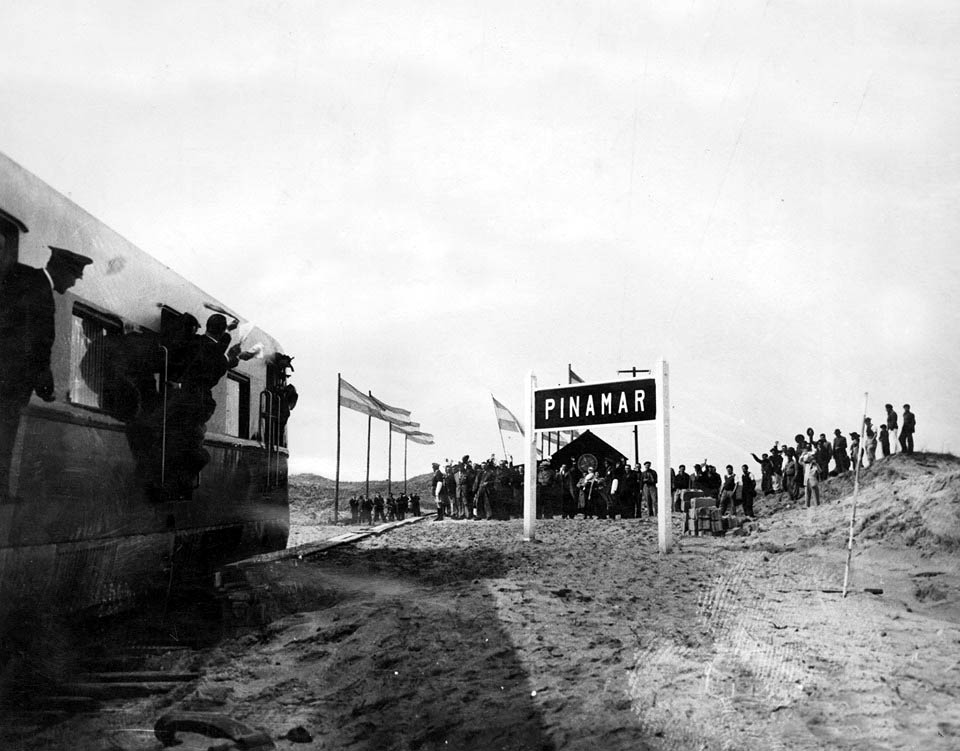
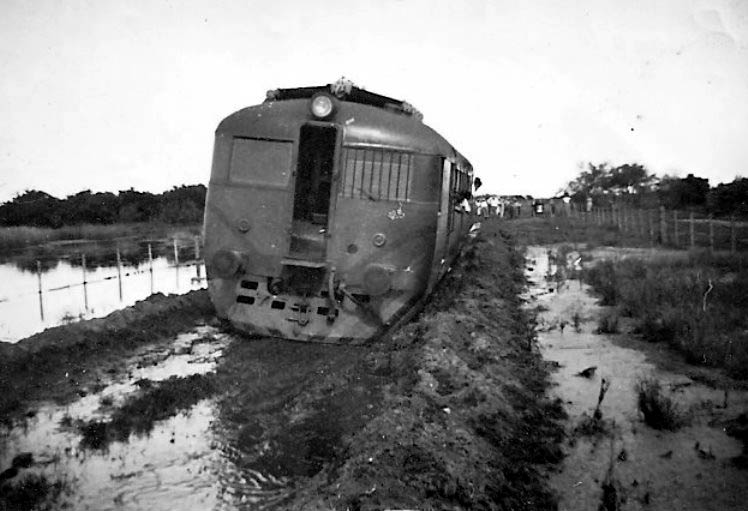
(Left): first train to arrive in Pinamar in August 1949; (right): A Drewry railcar being struck in the mood due to difficult weather conditions on the tracks

When the entire railway network was nationalised in Argentina in 1948, managers of BAGSR's successor, Ferrocarriles Argentinos, thought about using those old freight branches for a passenger service to Pinamar. After some studies, works began and in August 1949, the first Constitución – Pinamar service was opened to public. The Pinamar station was placed where today stays a park, on Av. Constitución e/ Apolo y Av. Intemedanos.

The first services were run by Ganz railcars that had been also used by the Argentine State Railway to run services to Bariloche. However, subsequent services to Pinamar would be run by Drewry vehicles. The Constitución – Pinamar service was run for 18 years until December 12, 1967, when the service was definitely closed. Tracks were lifted in the 1970s.

=== New station: 1996 ===
In 1991 the Governor of Buenos Aires Province, Eduardo Duhalde, expressed his intention to reactivate the Gral. Guido – Gral. Madariaga service (those tracks had not been removed) also stating that the government was studying to extend the line to Pinamar. Services to General Madariaga were reactivated in May 1994, being operated by state-owned Ferrobaires, a company established by the province to operate passenger trains in the territory after Carlos Menem's administration closed all the services in March 1993.

Between 1994 and 1996 rail tracks were put back (as the original had been lifted after the closure of the line) from Gral. Madariaga while a new station started to be built, now distant 1,5 km west of the Route 11, unlike the original Pinamar station, to avoid a level crossing on a highly trafficked road. The new stop, named "Divisadero de Pinamar", was inaugurated on December 7, 1996.

=== Aftermath ===
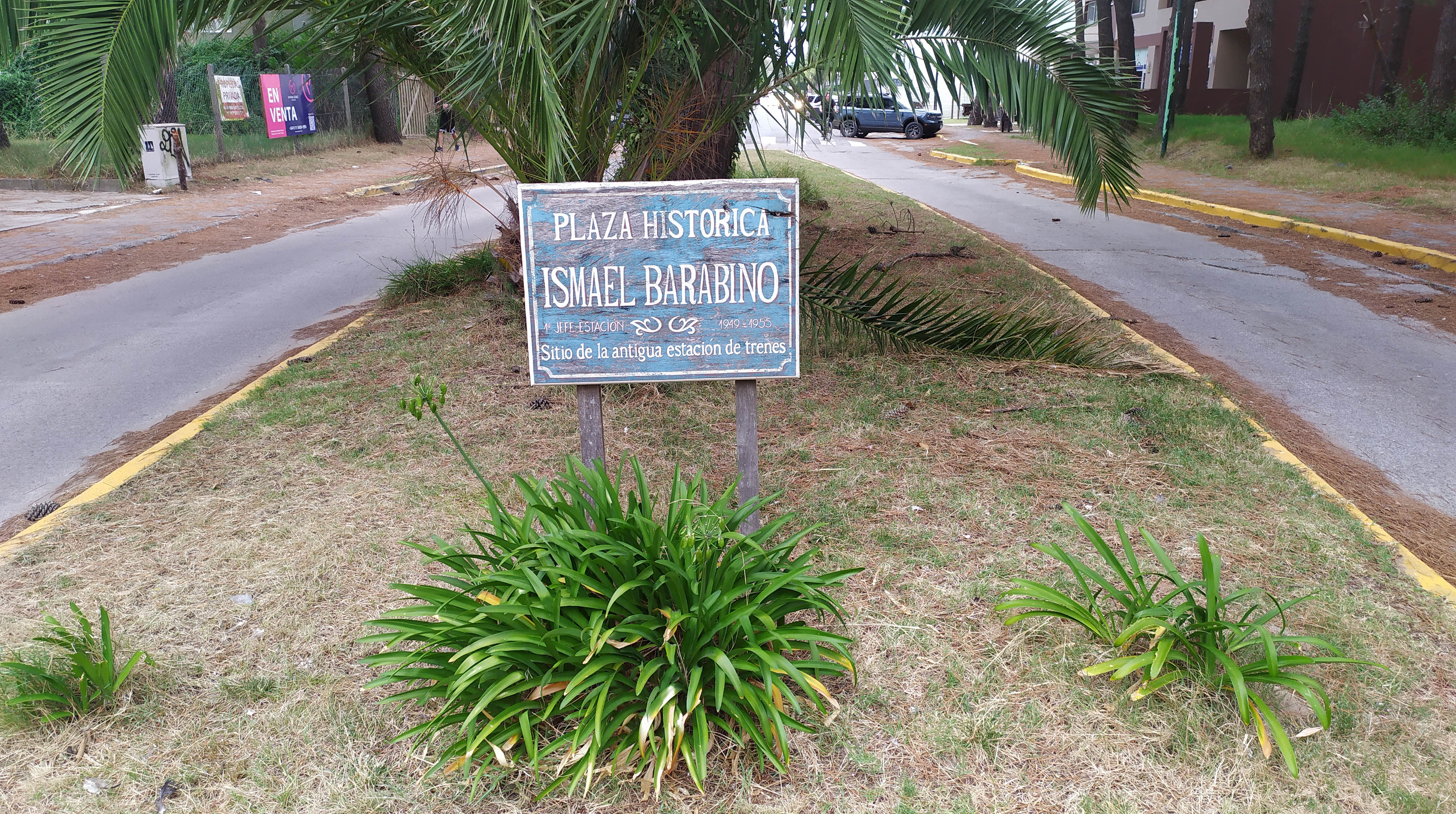
A plaque was put on the place where the station was located, on Av. Constitución

On the site where the station was located (currently a small square on Avenida Constitución between Apolo and Avenida Intermédanos), a plaque was placed to keep the memory active. A pine planted in 1949 still stands there.

The square was named "Ismael Barabino" to honor the first stationmaster, who was in charge from its inauguration in 1949 to 1955.

A project to run an ecological tourist train between General Madariaga and Pinamar was launched in 2016, but it was never carried out.
