= Pinamar Partido =

Pinamar Partido de Pinamar
- Department
- Flag Logo

- location of Pinamar Partido in Buenos Aires Province
- Coordinates: 37°07′S 56°52′W
- Country: Argentina
- Established: April 11, 1978
- Founder: provincial law 9024
- Seat: Pinamar

Government
  - Intendant: Juan Ibarguren (PRO)

Area
  - Total: 63 km^{2} (24 sq mi)

Population
  - Total: 20,666
  - Density: 330/km^{2} (850/sq mi)
- Demonym: pinamarense
- Postal Code: B7167
- IFAM: BUE097
- Area Code: 02254
- Patron saint: ?
- Website: pinamar.gob.ar

Pinamar Partido is a partido on the Atlantic coast of Buenos Aires Province in Argentina. It limits with La Costa Partido to the north, the Atlantic Ocean to the east, the route 11/Interbalnearia to the west, and Villa Gesell Partido to the south.

The provincial subdivision has a population of about 20,000 inhabitants in an area of 63 km^{2} (24 sq mi), and its capital city is Pinamar, which is around 349 km (217 mi) from Buenos Aires.

The Pinamar Partido was created on July 1, 1978, through Decree/Law 9.024/78 promulgated by the Provincial Government. Until then, the city of Pinamar had been part of General Madariaga Partido.

== History ==
=== Origins ===
In the XIX century, the region where the Pinamar Partido stays nowadays was a desertic area plenty of dunes facing the sea. Those dunes constituted the fields called "Los Montes Grandes de Juancho", which belonged to Don Martín de Alzaga, an older man and landowner, who had married Felicitas Guerrero in 1862, a young woman of only 16 years old.

When Martín de Álzaga died in 1870, Felicitas inherited these lands that were part of the Bella Vista, La Postrera and Laguna de Juancho ranches. After the murder of Felicitas, victim of a femicide committed by Enrique Ocampo, these lands are inherited by her parents: Carlos José Guerrero and Felicitas González de Cueto. When the marriage dies, their children inherit, who would be Felicitas' brothers; and among these, Carlos and Manuel Guerrero would correspond to the lands that reached the sea and that finally Héctor Manuel and Valeria Guerrero would turn these moors into the most exclusive tourist destinations on the Argentine Atlantic coast.

=== Ostende ===
Decauville railway

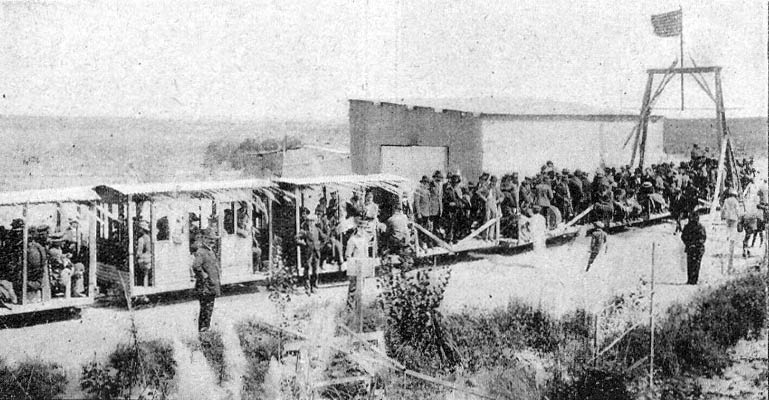
Campos (then, "Tokio") station, where passengers boarded the train after being transported by carriages (1913)

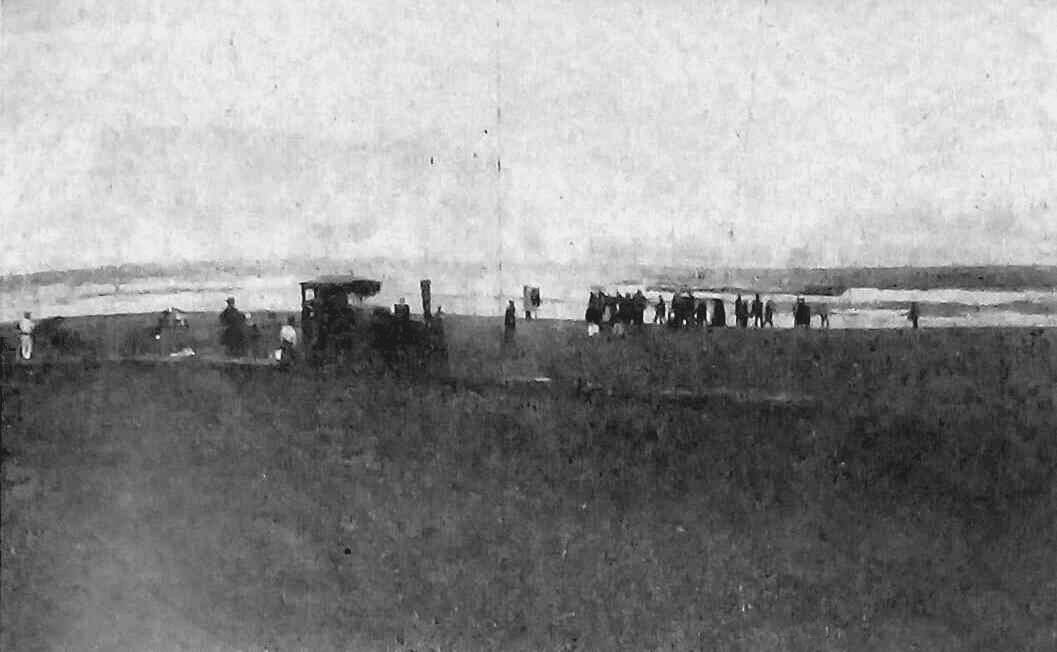
The train running along the beach (1913)

The first city established in the region was "Ostende" founded by Belgian Fernando Robette and Italian Agustín Poli. They had bought the land from Don Manuel with the aim of designing a sophisticated seaside resort with the same model as that city of Belgian origin whose name, Ostend, means “End of the East”. To go to Ostende, passengers went by train to Juancho station (via Constitución–General Madariaga), then being transported by horse-drawn carriages to "Colonia Tokio" station where they took a narrow-gauge railway (Decauville) to Ostende. It was a 3 km-length railroad that reached the beach. On economic grounds, the coming of the train helped the zone to increase its production. Apart from cattle, producers commercialised apples and firewood, for which some small branches were built. One of those branches reached the point where the intersection of RP 11 and RP 74 is placed today, very close to the entrance to Pinamar. Nevertheless, most of those branches would be lifted in the 1940s.

When Robette was already settled he began the work to concretize his projects. Some of the constructions were a dock, and the "Hotel Termas"; That same year the construction of the Rambla Sur also began, which was intended to be an extensive coastal promenade. These works were made very hard, since in addition to the inclemency of the winds, the materials for the constructions had to be sent from Buenos Aires, being the Cabo Corrientes steamship one of the means used for transportation at that time.

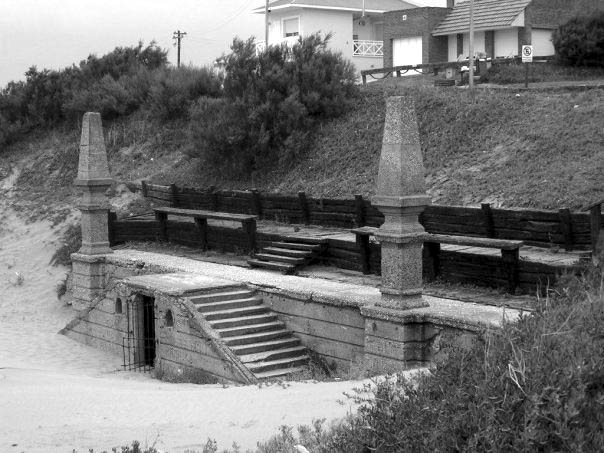
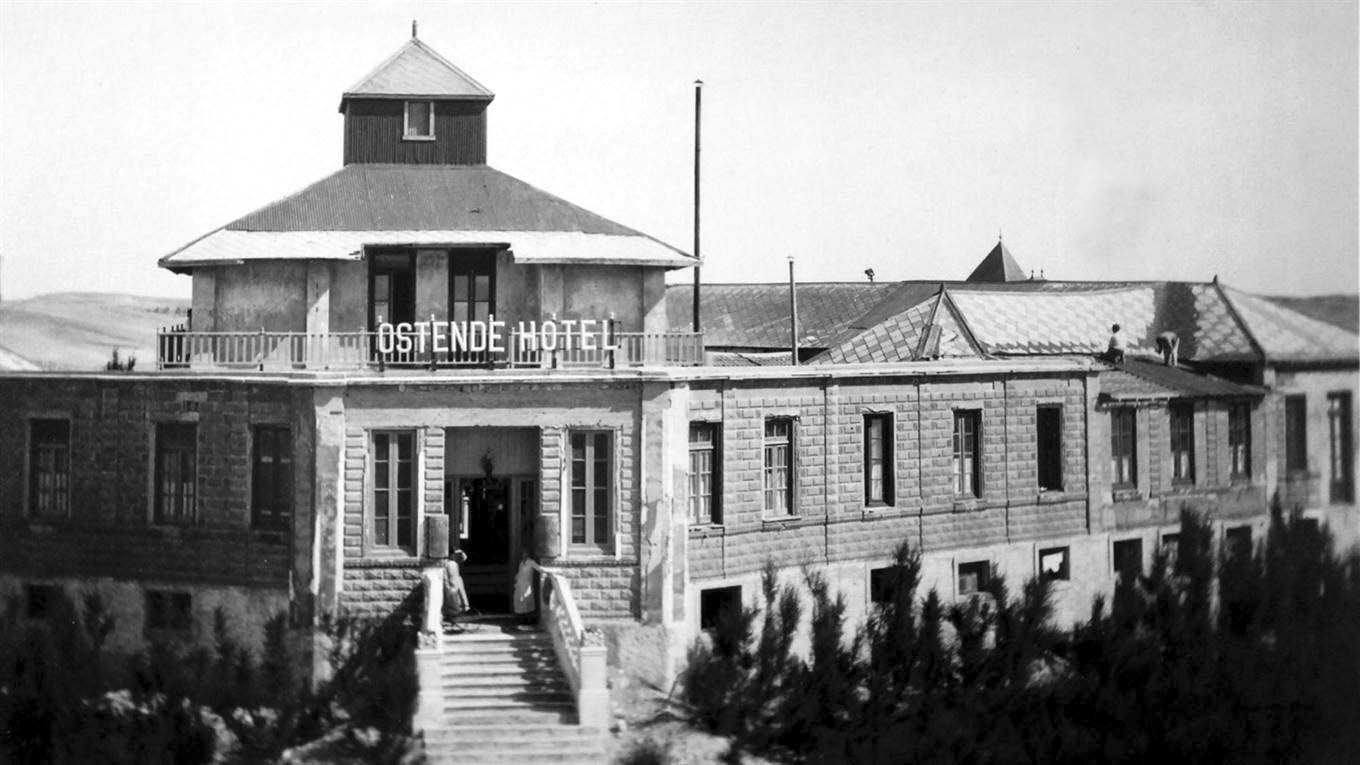
Two characteristic buildings in Ostende, (left): the "rambla" (boardwalk) built in 1912, and "Hotel Ostende" (right), opened in 1913

Finally, on April 6, 1913, the founding ceremony of the new city was celebrated and an important advertising campaign was produced to promote the sale of the lots. Then the houses of Fernando Robette were built, the House of Spiritual Retreats of the Carmelite Monks, the house of one of the first families to spend the summer in Ostende, called Villa Adela, and also a chapel whose owner was Mr. Domingo Repetto, which years later it would disappear due to abandonment and strong sand storms.

To promote tourism on the zone, an hotel ("Hotel Termas", then "Hotel Ostende") was opened. It was inaugurated in December 1913 and had 80 rooms plus rooms for games, lecture, and fencing, restaurants, winter gardens, and even a pasta factory and pastry shop.

During these years the Belgians return to Europe possibly because of the World War I and never returned. After several failed afforestation attempts, the sand buried several constructions, including the boulevard, evidencing the failure of the project to fix the dunes. Ostende (among with other towns) would be annexed into Pinamar Partido in 1983.

=== Cariló, Pinamar, and Valeria del Mar ===
To the south of Ostende, another of Felicitas's heirs, her nephew Don Héctor Manuel Guerrero, decided in 1918 to start fixing the sand dunes of his estate called Charles to later install a nursery and plant species from different regions of the world. Over time these plantations, which were carried out with carts pulled by 8 horses, were transformed into a forest as rich in species as the one we know today by the name of "Cariló", a Mapuche word that means 'Green Medano'. In 1960 the subdivision of that forest began and then with the first constructions.

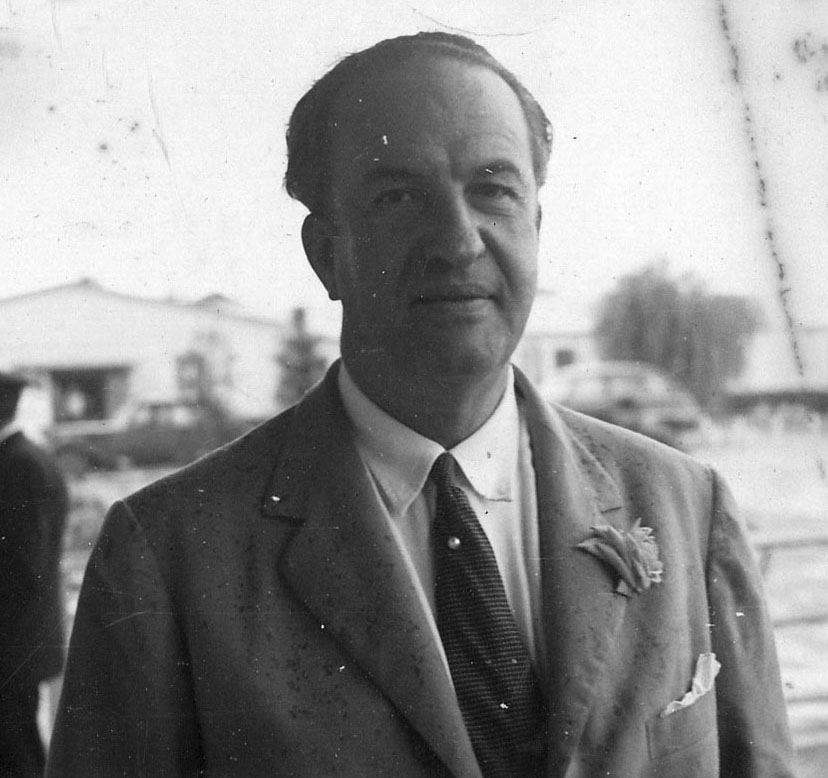
Jorge Bunge, founder of Pinamar

In the last years of the 30's, architect Jorge Bunge, a visionary man, associated with Valeria Guerrero, owner of the land and Felicitas's niece, both formed a partnership and the architect Jorge Bunge created an urban design as particular as innovative, tracing the streets in the form of arabesques and curves to respect the dunes and undulations of the landscape. This is how the fixation of the dunes begins, the opening of streets and the first constructions such as La Hostería, the Hotel Pinamar, where the first tourists came to stay, the water tank at the Mirador de Galatea and Parque Del Tridente and the first private houses. On February 14, 1943, Pinamar was inaugurated as a spa and shortly after the Urbanization Master Plan presented by the architect Jorge Bunge was approved.

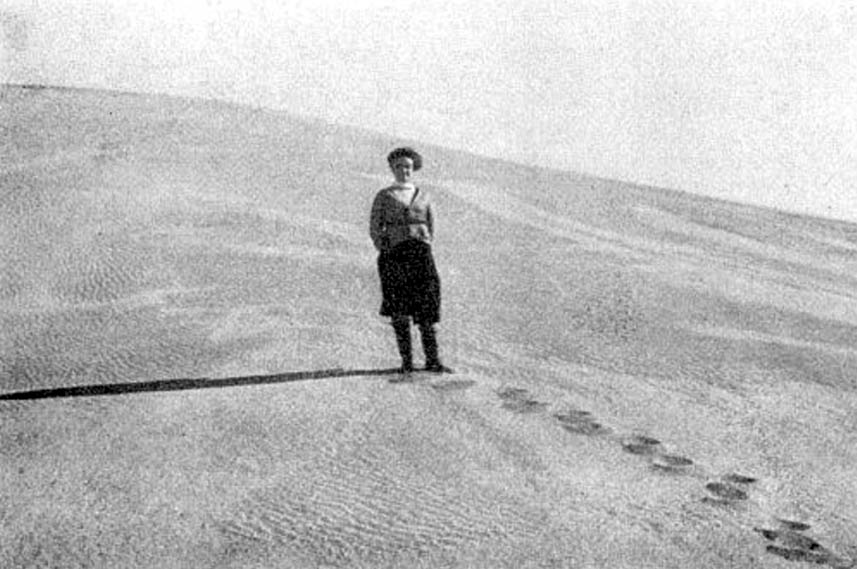
Valeria Guerrero, who gave her name to "Valeria del Mar"

In August 1949 the train arrived in Pinamar, and the road between Pinamar and Madariaga was created. In the mid-1940s, Valeria Guerrero decided to create her own tourist village on land that belonged to her, then the town of Valeria del Mar was founded, dunes were fixed, the area was forested with many acacias and in 1960 the first subdivision is carried out, while in 1964 the first apartment building facing the sea called "El Atlántico" is enabled.

Finally in July 1978 the "Urban Municipality of Pinamar" was created through Decree n° 9.024/78 promulgated by the Provincial Government. Therefore Pinamar became independent from General Madariaga Partido. Apart from Pinamar, creation of La Costa, Villa Gesell, and Monte Hermoso municipalities were included in the decret..

Access to region were improved when the Route 11 was paved The old path remained as a graved road, and entrances to Pinamar, Cariló, and Valeria del Mar were added. In 1983, its name was changed to "Partido de Pinamar", being formed by the towns of Pinamar, Ostende, Valeria del Mar, and Cariló. In 1993, the town of Mar de Ostende was officially incorporated to Pinamar Partido.

== Economy ==
The economy of Pinamar Partido is dominated by the summer tourist season (December–February), which sees hundreds of thousands of Porteños make their way to the Atlantic coast of Buenos Aires Province. Pinamar Partido benefits from 25 km (16 mi) of beaches.

== Attractions ==
Pinamar Partido has miles of unspoiled beaches and hundreds of acres of woodland and sand dunes. The partido has three golf courses and a wide selection of bars and restaurants.

== Settlements ==
- Cariló
- Mar de Ostende
- Montecarlo
- Ostende
- Pinamar (capital)
- Valeria del Mar
