= Divisadero de Pinamar railway station =

Railway station in Buenos Aires

Divisadero de Pinamar
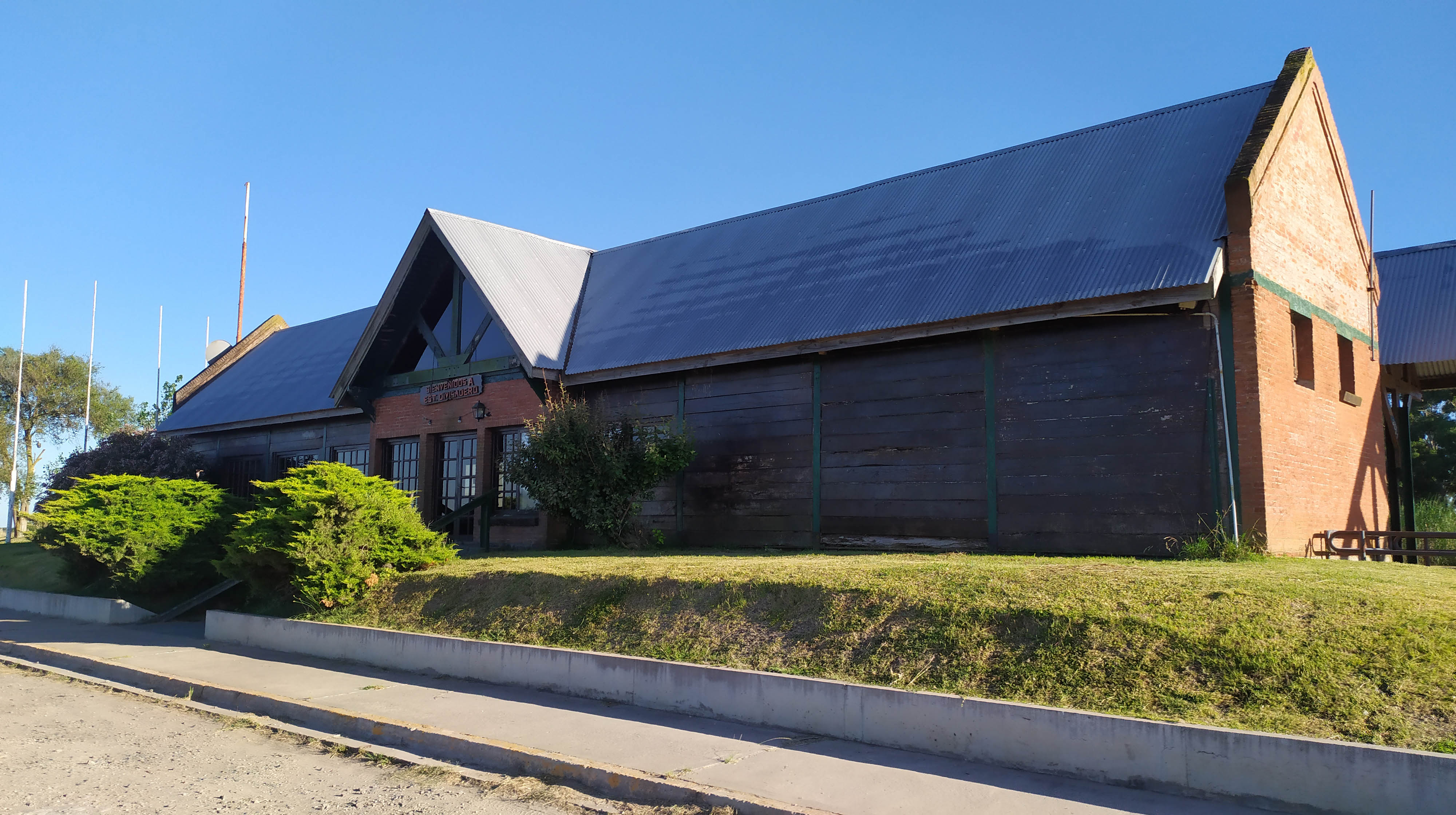
- Station building in February 2026

General information
- Location: PR74, km 1.5; Argentina
- Owner: Government of Argentina
- Operator: Trenes Argentinos Operaciones
- Line: Roca
- Distance: 345 (from Buenos Aires)
- Platforms: 1
- Tracks: 2

History
- Opened: 1996
- Closed: April 1, 2025; 16 months ago
Location

Divisadero de Pinamar is a former railway station in General Madariaga Partido of Buenos Aires Province, Argentina. The station was inaugurated in 1996 as an extension of the General Guido – General Madariaga branch of General Roca Railway.

After some closures, the station was active with trains that transported people from Constitución, Buenos Aires, to turistic cities of Atlantic Coast such as Pinamar and Villa Gesell. It was operated by state-owned Trenes Argentinos Operaciones until April 2025, when the service was suspended.

== History ==
=== Background: the first station ===
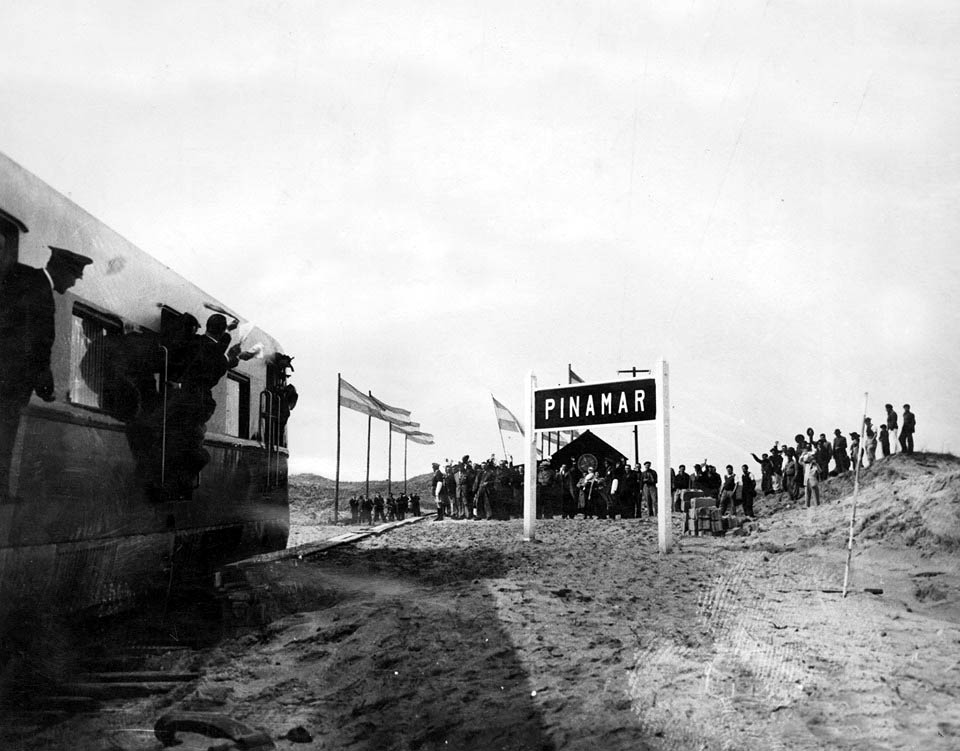
First passenger train arriving in Pinamar station, August 1949

By the beginning of the 20th century, the agricultural producers that lived next to the Atlantic coast were forced to make long trips driving their cattle to the BAGSR stations of the Constitución–Mar del Plata line. After their requests, the BAGSR built a branch from Gral. Guido to Juancho in General Madariaga Partido.

The economical growth of the region allowed its inhabitants to produce other goods so new branches were built to facilitate their transport. One of those branches reached the point where the intersection of RP 11 and RP 74 is placed today, very close to the entrance to Pinamar. Nevertheless, most of those branches would be lifted in the 1940s.

In 1949, state-owned Ferrocarriles Argentinos used remaining tracks to open a passenger service to Pinamar, which was opened in August 1949. The service operated until December 1967, when it was closed.

=== Rebirth with a new station (1996–2011) ===
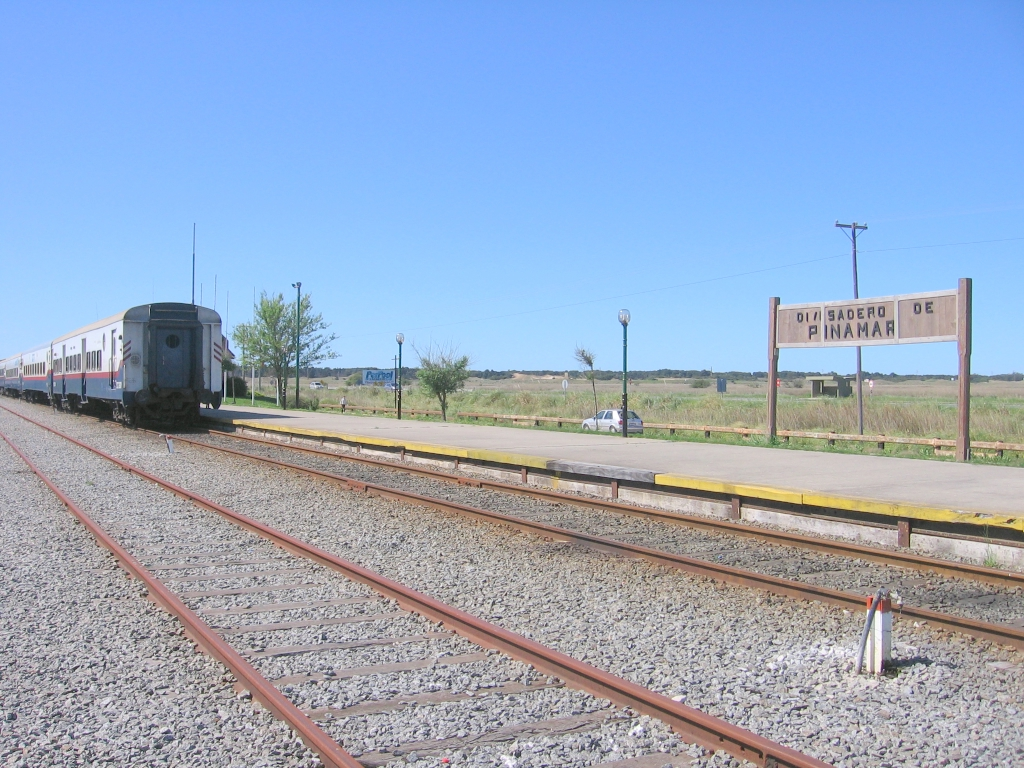
Station platform and sign in 2006

In 1991 the Governor of Buenos Aires Province, Eduardo Duhalde, expressed his intention to reactivate the Gral. Guido – Gral. Madariaga service (those tracks had not been removed) also stating that the government was studying to extend the line to Pinamar. Services to General Madariaga were reactivated in May 1994, being operated by state-owned Ferrobaires, a company established by the province to operate passenger trains in the territory after Carlos Menem's administration closed all the services in March 1993.

Between 1994 and 1996 new tracks were added from Gral. Madariaga and a new station named "Divisadero de Pinamar". The new station was built1,5 km from the Route 11 (west direction) and more distant than the original Pinamar station closed in 1967 to avoid a level crossing on a highly trafficked route.

Divisadero de Pinamar was inaugurated on December 7, 1996.

=== Decadence and closure (2011–2025) ===
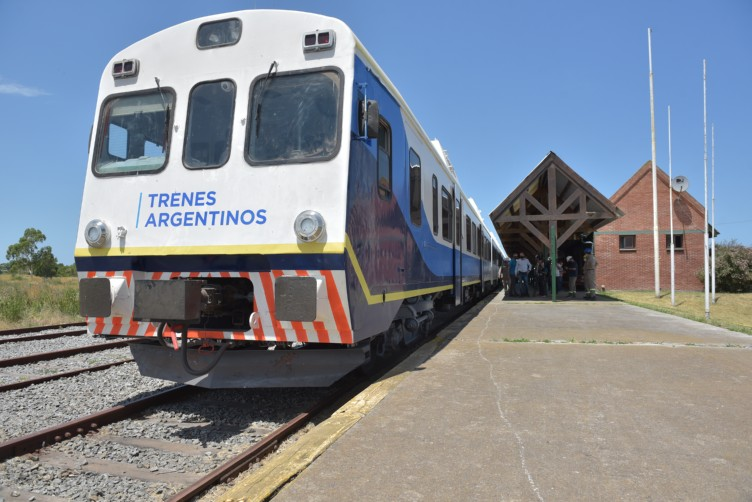
Train at Divisadero de Pinamar in January 2021

From 1996 to 2011, trains run from Constitución to Pinamar normally. In July 2011, a train crash near Lezama caused 70 people were injured. Due to lack of rolling stock, Ferrobaires ceased to run trains. The situation lasted four years until July 2015, when the service was reestablished, with a frequency reduced to once a week. Nevertheless, only 30 days after the service returned, it was suspended again due to Salado River flooding. In 2016, Ferrobaires was put in a hiatus until its definitely shut down that same year. a process that had been unsuccessfully attempted in 2007. Therefore, passenger services formerly operated by the provincial administration (since 1993) would be run by Operadora Ferroviaria Sociedad del Estado (SOFSE)., with all its services and assets being transferred to the National State.

As time went by, the Divisadero de Pinamar station suffered an increasing deterioration. In July 2019, it was announced that Trenes Argentinos had given the administration of the station to General Madariaga Partido, which had plans to establish a fruit market at the former station. Nevertheless, the inhabitants of Pinamar did not agree with the project. Finally it was not carried out.

In August 2020, Trenes Argentinos made some studies in order of reestablish the service. After the first test ride in January 2021, the train was put into service again on January 25, 2021, with a daily frequency.

Nevertheless, the service from Guido to Pinamar was closed by Trenes Argentinos in April 2025. The company alleged increasing maintenance costs, lower demand, and infrastructure problems (including the bad conditions of some bridges of the line that jeopardised safety) as causal factors.

== Operators ==
Since the opening of Divisadero station in 1996, services have been operated by:

Company	Period
Ferrobaires	1996–2011, 2015
Trenes Argentinos	2021–2025
