= Ostende, Buenos Aires =

Ostende
- City
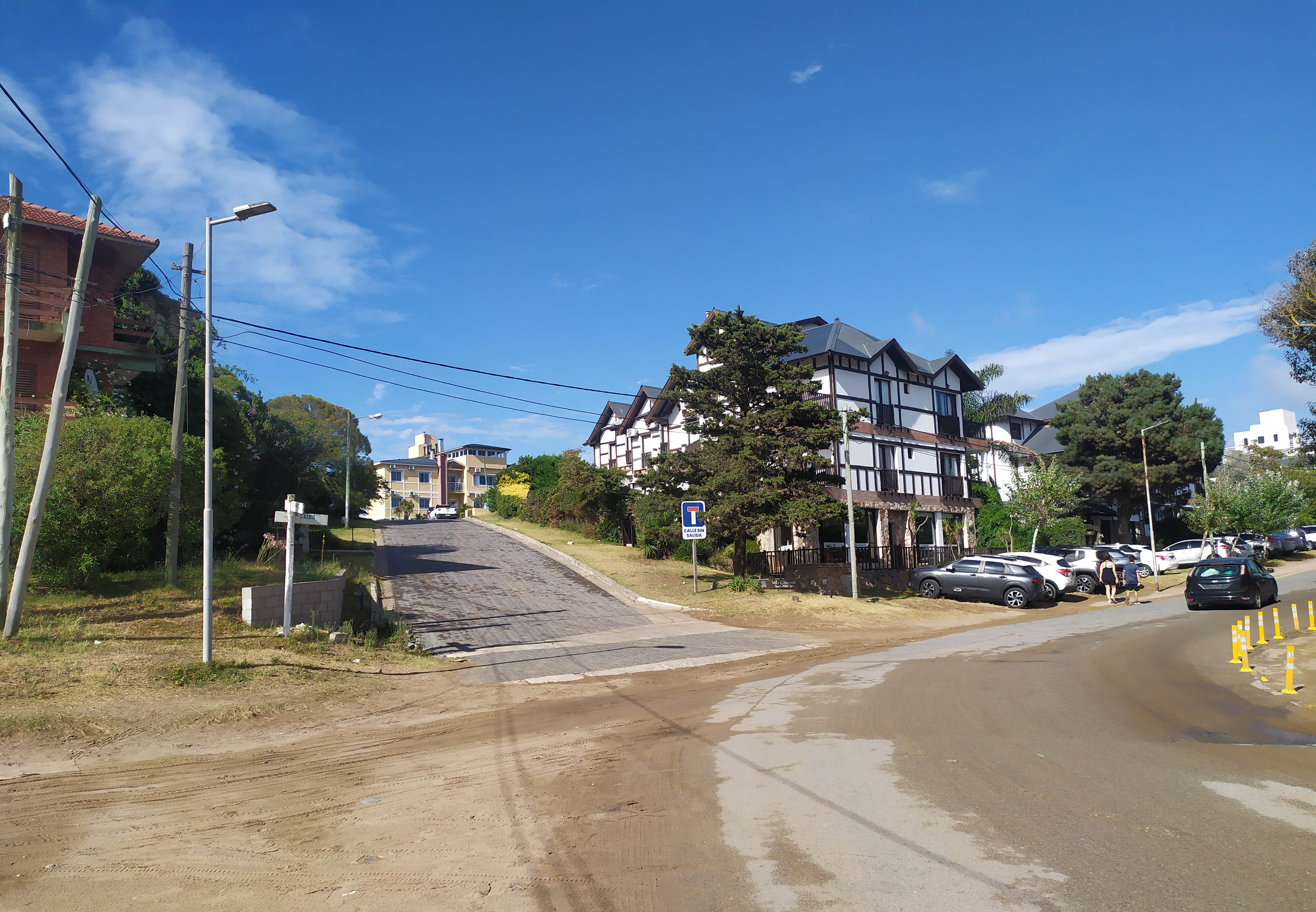
- Biarritz and Cairo streets, February 2025

- Location in Argentina
- Coordinates: 37°06′S 56°51′W
- Country: Argentina
- Province: Buenos Aires
- Partido: Pinamar
- Founded: 1913; 113 years ago

Government
  - Intendant: Juan Ibarguren (PRO)
- Elevation: 14 m (46 ft)

Population (2001)
  - Total: 6,073
- CPA Base: B 7167
- Area code: +54 2254

Ostende is a seaside resort on the Argentine Atlantic Coast belonging to the Pinamar Partido. The town limits to the north with the city of Pinamar, to the northeast with Mar de Ostende, to the south with Valeria del Mar, to the east with the Argentine Sea and to the west with General Madariaga Partido.

Its landscape is characterized by wide beaches and large dunes full of leafy tamarisk trees.

== History ==
=== Background ===
In the 19th century, the region where the Pinamar Partido stays nowadays was a desertic area plenty of dunes facing the sea. Those dunes constituted the fields called "Los Montes Grandes de Juancho", which belonged to Don Martín de Alzaga, an older man and landowner, who had married Felicitas Guerrero in 1862, a young woman of only 16 years old.

When Martín de Álzaga died in 1870, Felicitas inherited these lands that were part of the Bella Vista, La Postrera and Laguna de Juancho ranches. After the murder of Felicitas, victim of a femicide committed by Enrique Ocampo, these lands are inherited by her parents: Carlos José Guerrero and Felicitas González de Cueto. When the marriage dies, their children inherit, who would be Felicitas' brothers; and among these, Carlos and Manuel Guerrero would correspond to the lands that reached the sea and that finally Héctor Manuel and Valeria Guerrero would turn these moors into the most exclusive tourist destinations on the Argentine Atlantic coast.

=== Foundation ===
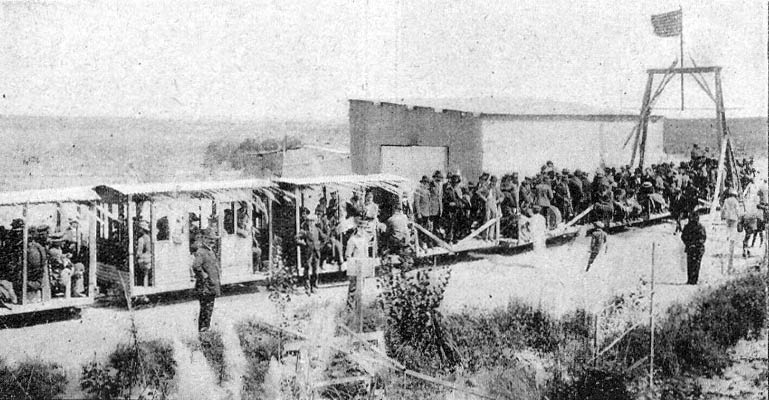
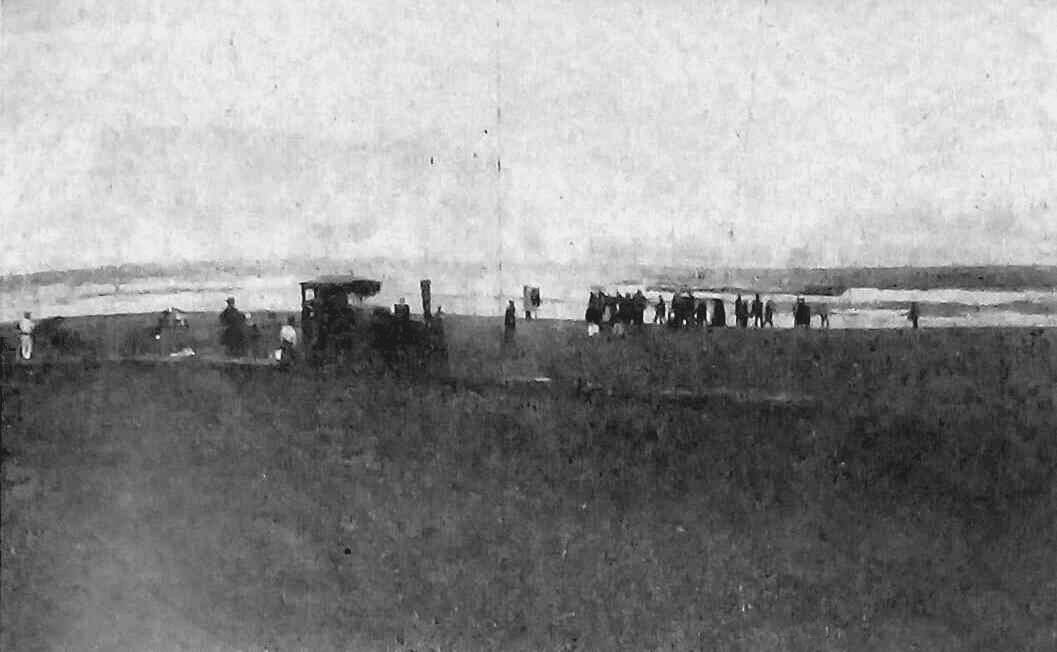
Two images of the Decauville railway of Ostende in 1913, (left): Campos (then, "Tokio") station, where passengers boarded the train after being transported by carriages; (right): the train running along the beach

Ostende was the first town established in region currently known as Pinamar Partido, having been founded by Belgian Fernando Robette and Italian Agustín Poli. They had arrived in 1908 and bought the land from Don Manuel with the aim of designing a sophisticated seaside resort with the same model as that city of Belgian origin whose name, Ostend (Oostende in Dutch), means “End of the East”. To go to Ostende, passengers went by train to Juancho station (via Constitución–General Madariaga), then being transported by horse-drawn carriages to "Colonia Tokio" (an estancia inhabited by Japanese immigrants) where they took a narrow-gauge railway (Decauville) to Ostende. It was a 3 km-length railroad that reached the beach. On economic grounds, the coming of the train helped the zone to increase its production. Apart from cattle, producers commercialised apples and firewood, for which some small branches were built. One of those branches reached the point where the intersection of RP 11 and RP 74 is placed today, very close to the entrance to Pinamar. Nevertheless, most of those branches would be lifted in the 1940s.

When Robette was already settled he began the work to concretize his projects. Some of the constructions were a dock, and the "Hotel Termas"; That same year the construction of the Rambla Sur also began, which was intended to be an extensive coastal promenade. These works were made very hard, since in addition to the inclemency of the winds, the materials for the constructions had to be sent from Buenos Aires, being the Cabo Corrientes steamship one of the means used for transportation at that time.

Finally, on April 6, 1913, the founding ceremony of the new city was celebrated and an important advertising campaign was produced to promote the sale of the lots. Then the houses of Fernando Robette were built, the House of Spiritual Retreats of the Carmelite Monks, the house of one of the first families to spend the summer in Ostende, called Villa Adela, and also a chapel whose owner was Mr. Domingo Repetto, which years later it would disappear due to abandonment and strong sand storms.

=== Development ===
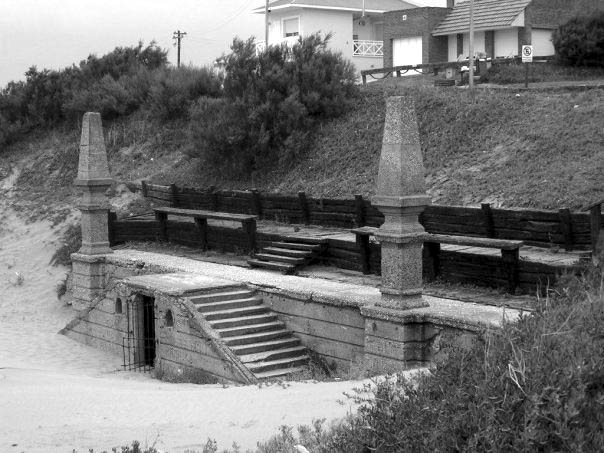
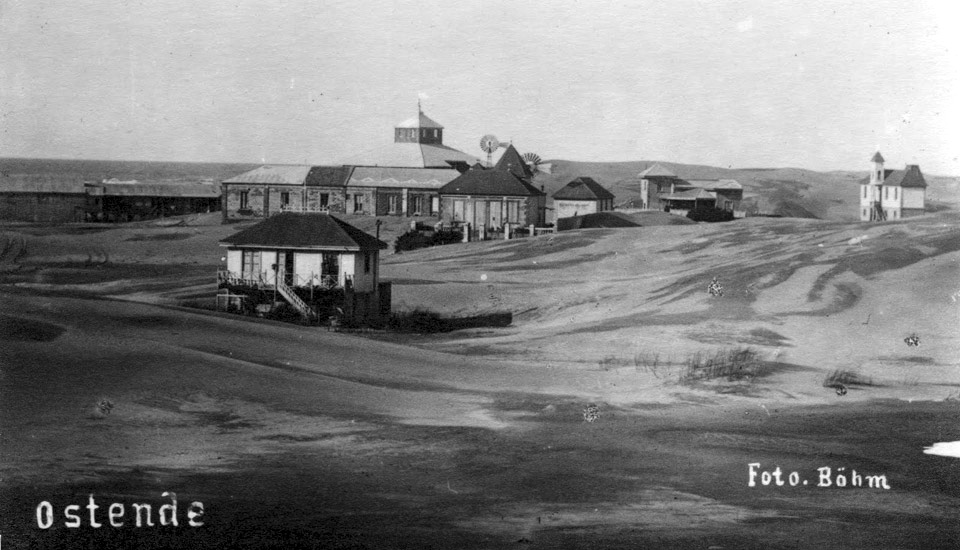
Two characteristic buildings in Ostende, (left): the "rambla" (boardwalk) built in 1912, and "Hotel Ostende" (right), opened in 1913

To promote tourism on the zone, a hotel ("Hotel Termas", then "Hotel Ostende") was opened. It was inaugurated in December 1913 and had 80 rooms plus rooms for games, lecture, and fencing, restaurants, winter gardens, and even a pasta factory and pastry shop.

During these years the Belgians return to Europe possibly because of the World War I and never returned. After several failed afforestation attempts, the sand buried several constructions, including the boulevard, evidencing the failure of the project to fix the dunes.

In 1943 Pinamar was inaugurated as a seaside resort and the following year the Executive Power of the Province of Buenos Aires approved the urbanization plan of Jorge Bunge, who had great success with the afforestation of the area to fix the dunes, Bunge's initiative was based on previous agronomic studies carried out by the Belgian hydraulic engineer Paul-Vincent Levieux and the landscaper Jean-Claude Nicolas Forestier.

The old Ostende project was temporarily eclipsed into oblivion, until on July 1, 1978, the Municipality of Pinamar (then "Pinamar Partido" in 1983) was created, annexing Ostende, among other localities, to its jurisdiction.

== Tourism ==
Ostende's beaches with their original dunes are covered by tamarisks, which differentiates them from those in the center and north of the district of Pinamar. The tourist profile of Ostend, like that of its neighboring town of Valeria del Mar, is markedly predominantly family-oriented, since neither of these two destinations have the hectic nightlife that attracts groups of young people alone.

Given its particular proximity to the bustling and commercial town of Pinamar, Ostende has almost taken on the character of a "residential suburb", being chosen primarily by those tourists who seek tranquility, green, and enjoy its peaceful beaches, but at the same time take advantage of the comfort of being a few blocks from the wide range of products and services of the Pinamarense shopping center.

The small downtown mainly offers supply stores such as warehouses, supermarkets, butchers, and some service establishments such as laundries, internet cafes, call shops, etc. The geographical proximity to the center of Pinamar to the north, and Valeria del Mar or even Cariló to the south, makes the development of leisure businesses unnecessary.

The lodging offer is made up of a few hotels, several inns and aparts, added to a wide variety of cabin complexes and private properties for temporary rental.

Pinamar, Ostende, Valeria del Mar, and Carilo make up a suburban corridor also known as the "Green Coast", a nickname possibly due to its lush afforestation both on its beaches and in its streets. As these four localities are conurbated, it allows access from any of them to the other three neighbors without the need to use the route 11. This green corridor is also famous for the medium/high socioeconomic level of its regular tourists.

=== Sites of interest ===
- Viejo Hotel Ostende: Regarded as the main Ostende's landmark, In the project of the founders Robette and Poli, the construction of a hotel with more than 80 rooms was planned. Originally named "Hotel Termas", it would later become the "Hotel Ostende". This site is also known as the "ghost hotel". It was always frequented by writers, who were inspired there to write some of their works. This is the case of the writer of The Little Prince, Antoine de Saint-Exupéry, who wrote his first texts during his two summers in Argentina. He stayed in room 51, a place that today is recreated just as he left it and open to public. In addition, the walls of the bar keep copies of the sketches of his work. Likewise, writers Adolfo Bioy Casares and Silvina Ocampo wrote the police novel Aquellos que aman, odian ("Those who love, hate"), whose plot takes place in the hotel, which they had visited in the 1940s. The hotel was also an inspiration for musicians and composers such as Indio Solari who wrote Ostende Hotel, a song of his album El ruiseñor, el amor y la muerte which describes a love story that takes place in the old hotel.
- Rambla: Formerly, "Rambla Sur", it was another initiative of pioneers Robette and Poli with the purpose of emblellishing the spa. The "Compañía de Navegación Lloyd Ostende" granted concession to build a boardwalk and a dock to promote urban development of a spa with European style. The cement boarwalk was designed to be 6 meters wide and included 16 chalets –with steps leading down to the beach– along its route. This would create an area dedicated exclusively to tourism that included changing rooms for bathers. Company 'Marcelo Prudent & Cia', concessionary of International Hennebique, was in charge of its construction which began in 1912 employing Japanese workforce from the "Colonia Tokio", a small town in the region distant few kilometers from there. Nevertheless, the coming of the World War I delayed works which abruptly ended. Over the years, the rambla would be buried by sand. It was not until the 1990s when an excavation work was carried out to preserve the construction. In 1995, the rambla was declared a "historical heritage" of the city. In summertime, it hosts cultural events.
- La Elenita: In the 1930s, Arturo Frondizi discovered the local beaches and decided to build a wooden house facing the sea. This was the town's first summer home and for many years the former president spent his vacations with his wife, Elena Faggionato, his daughter Elenita, and his family. In 1993, María Mercedes Faggionato, niece Frondizi's policy, decided to rebuild the house, since it was in poor condition. The house was declared as Provincial Heritage in 2002.
- House of Fernando Robette: it was built by one of Ostende's founders in 1912 but when he returned to France two years later, the house was left, and has remained abandoned since then.

=== Gallery ===
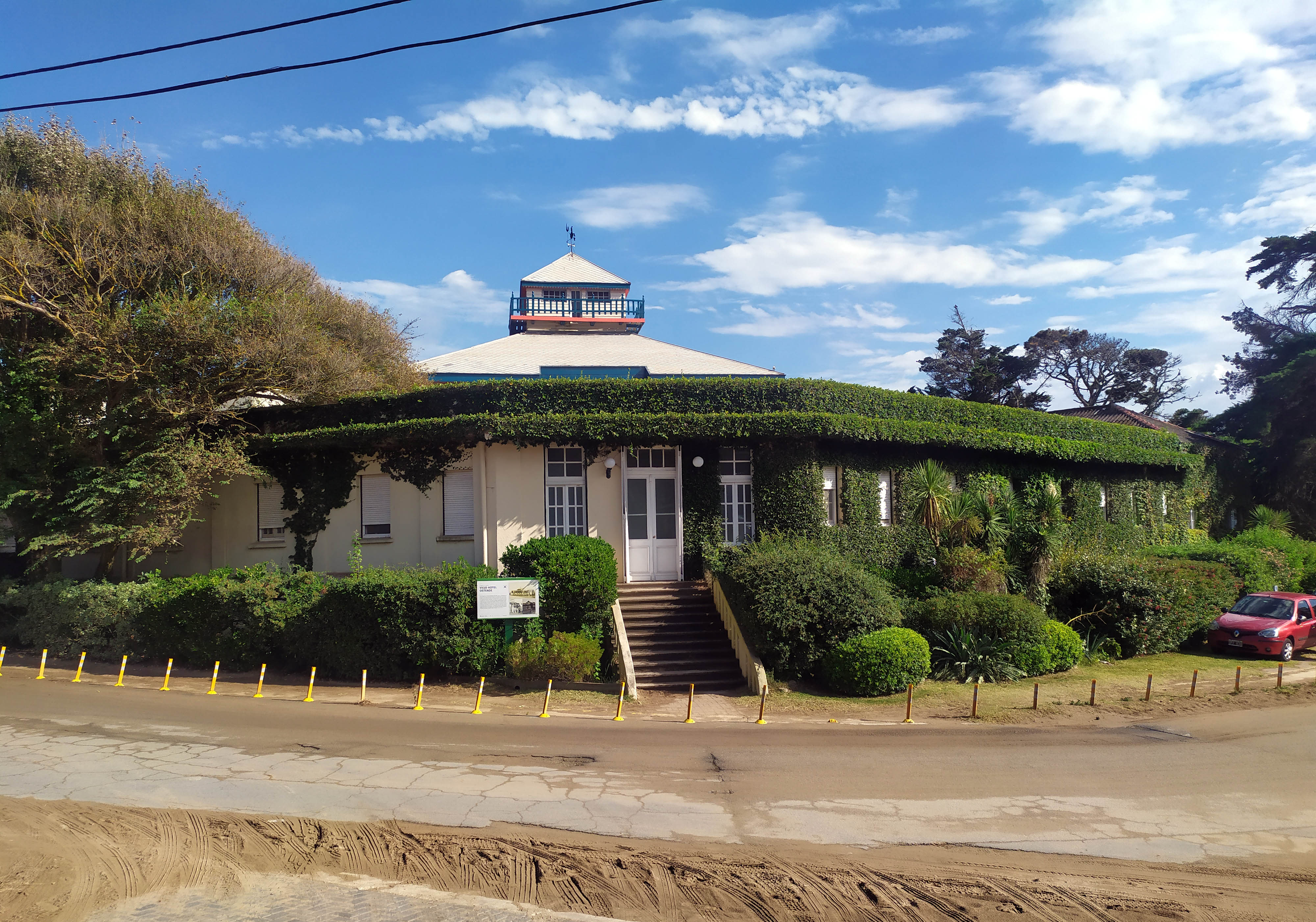
Viejo Hotel Ostende", opened in 1913

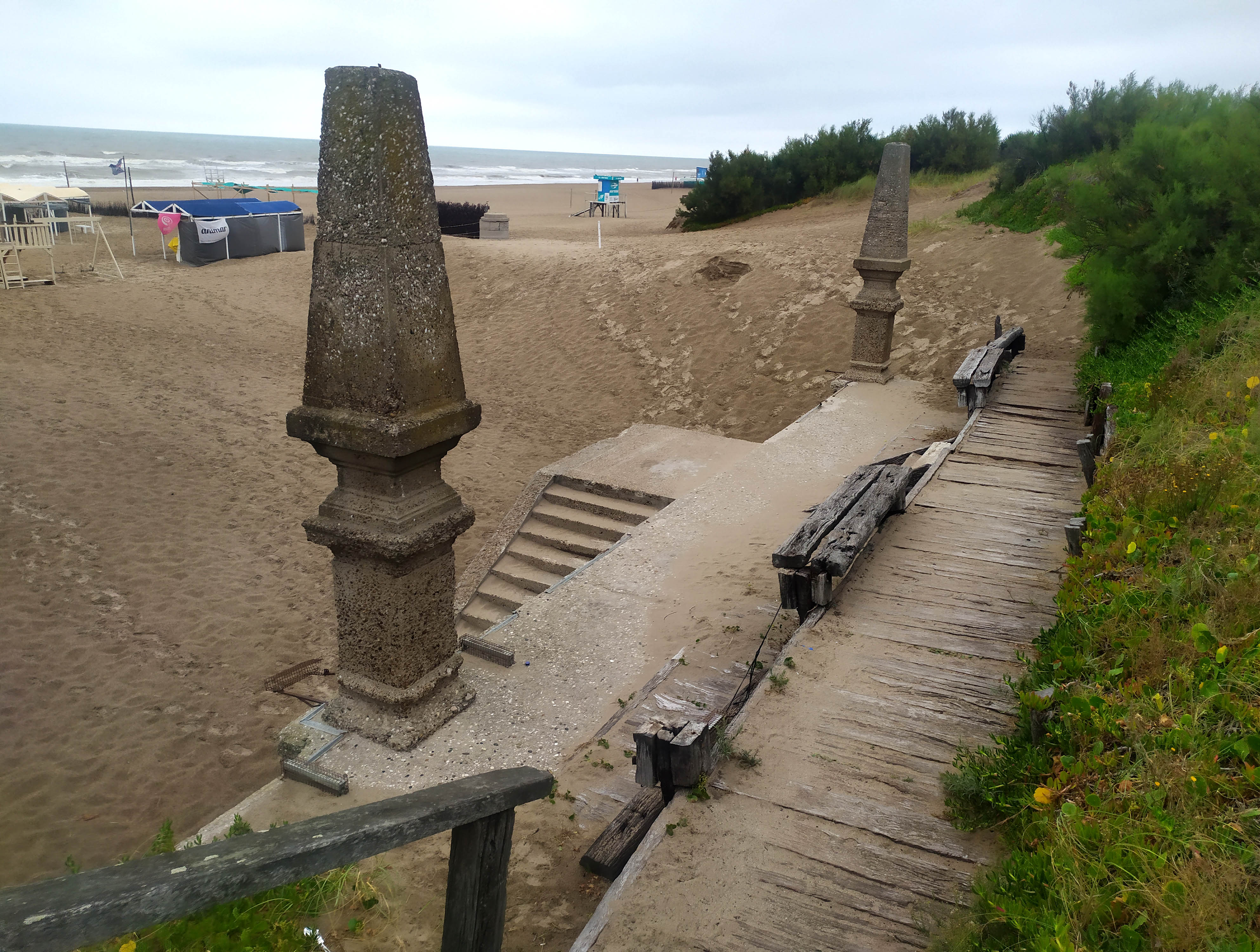
Vieja Rambla

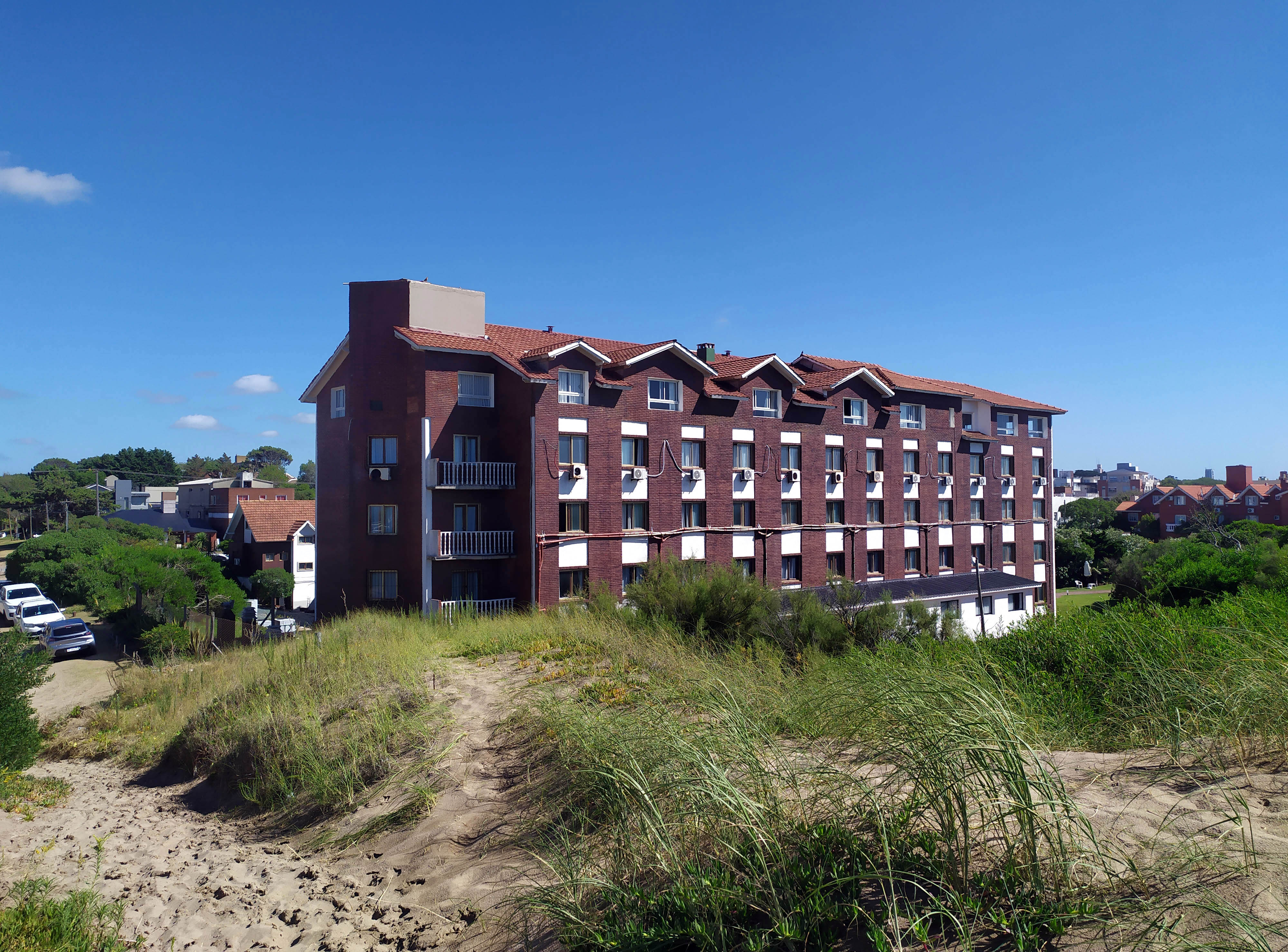
Hotel Savoia

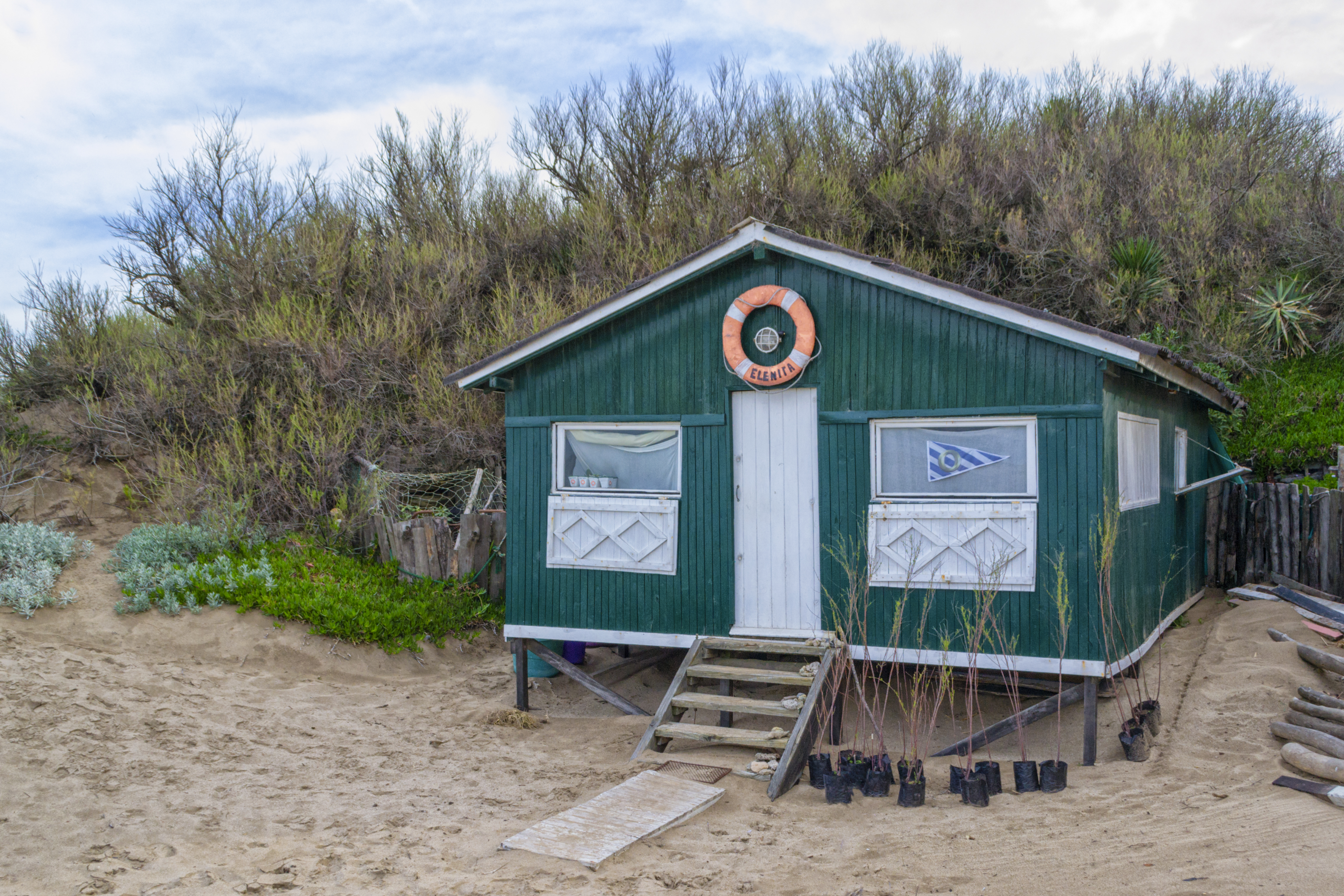
"La Elenita", former house of Arturo Frondizi

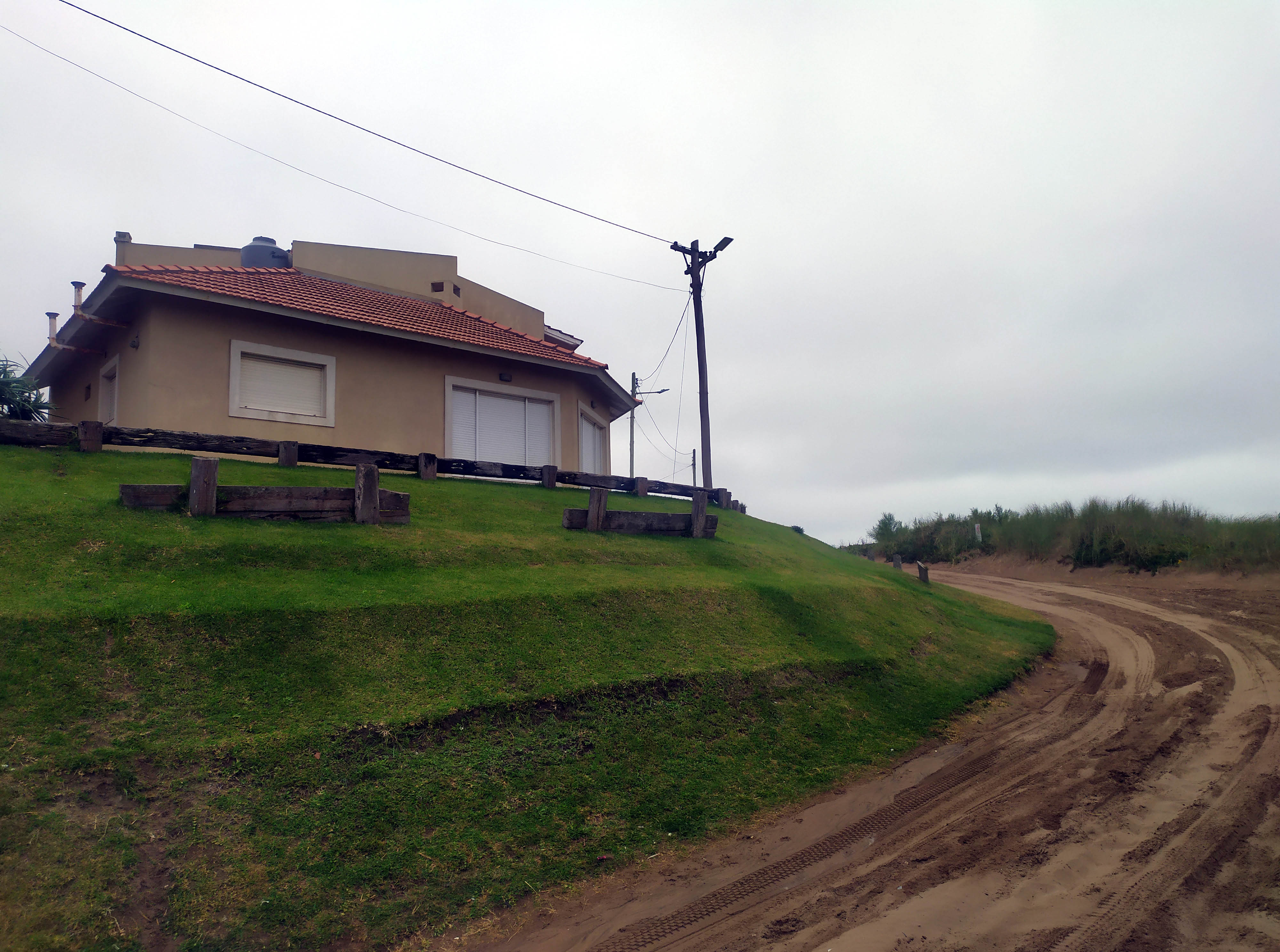
Chalet near the beach

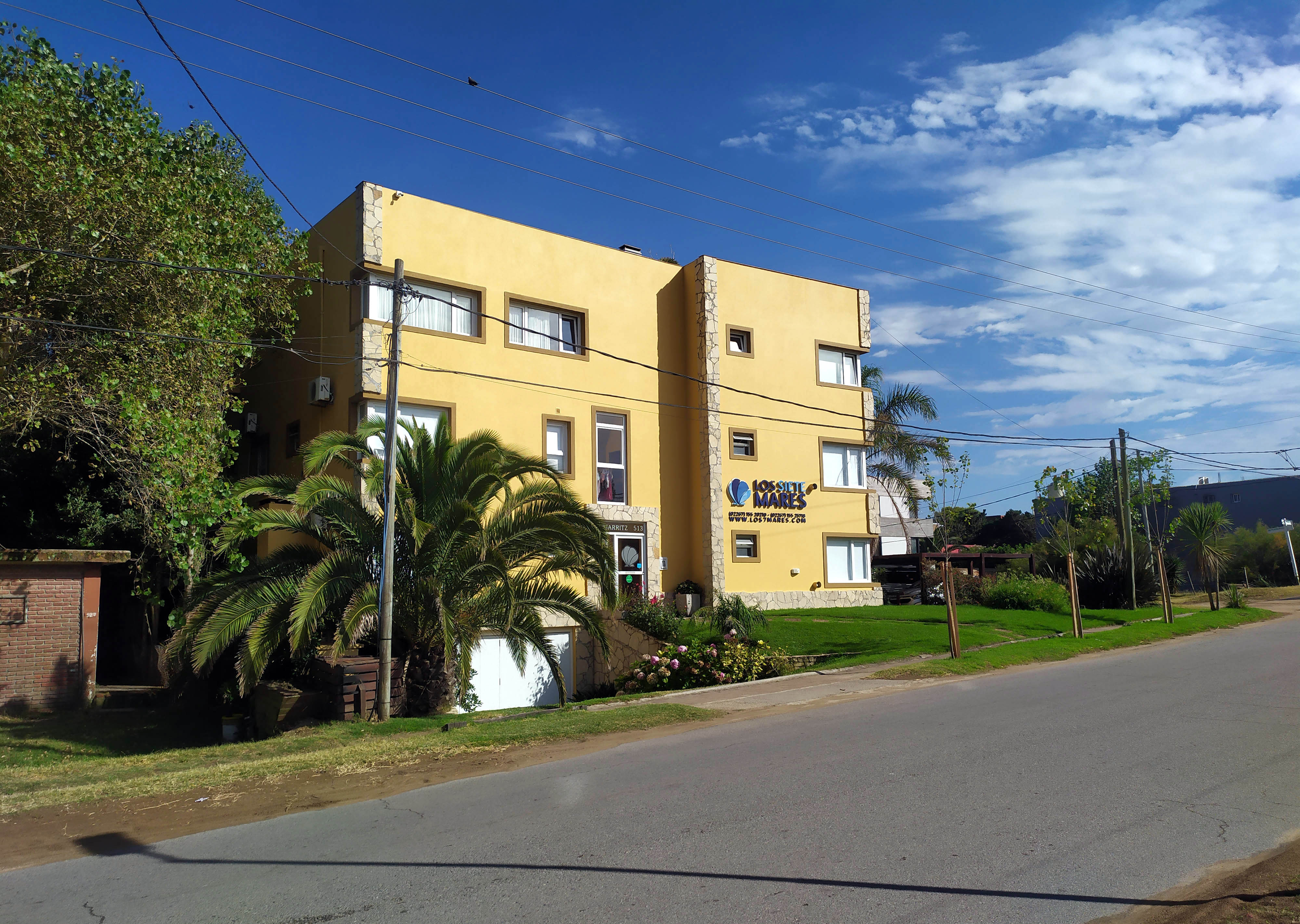
Hotel on Biarritz street

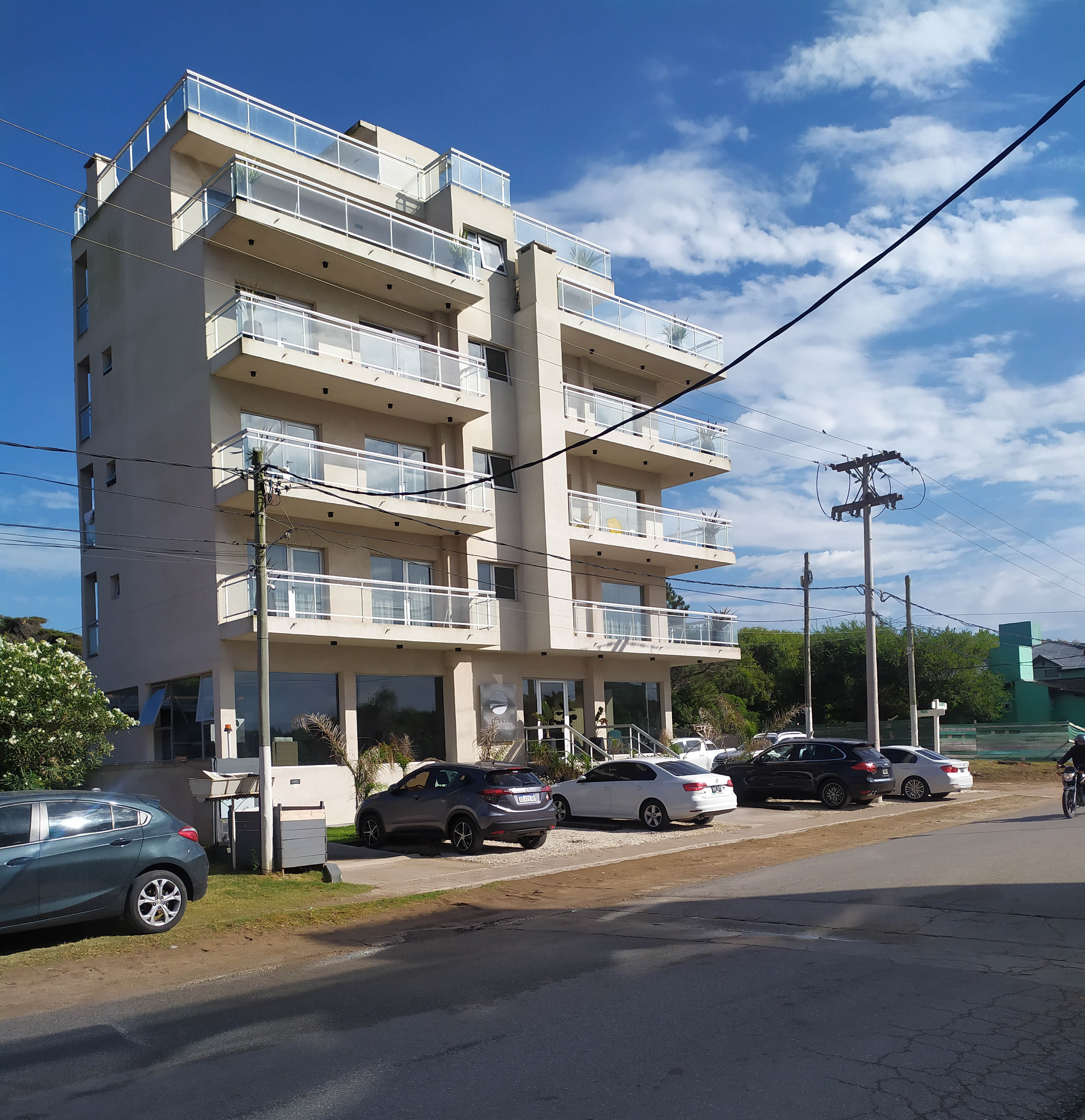
Apart hotel

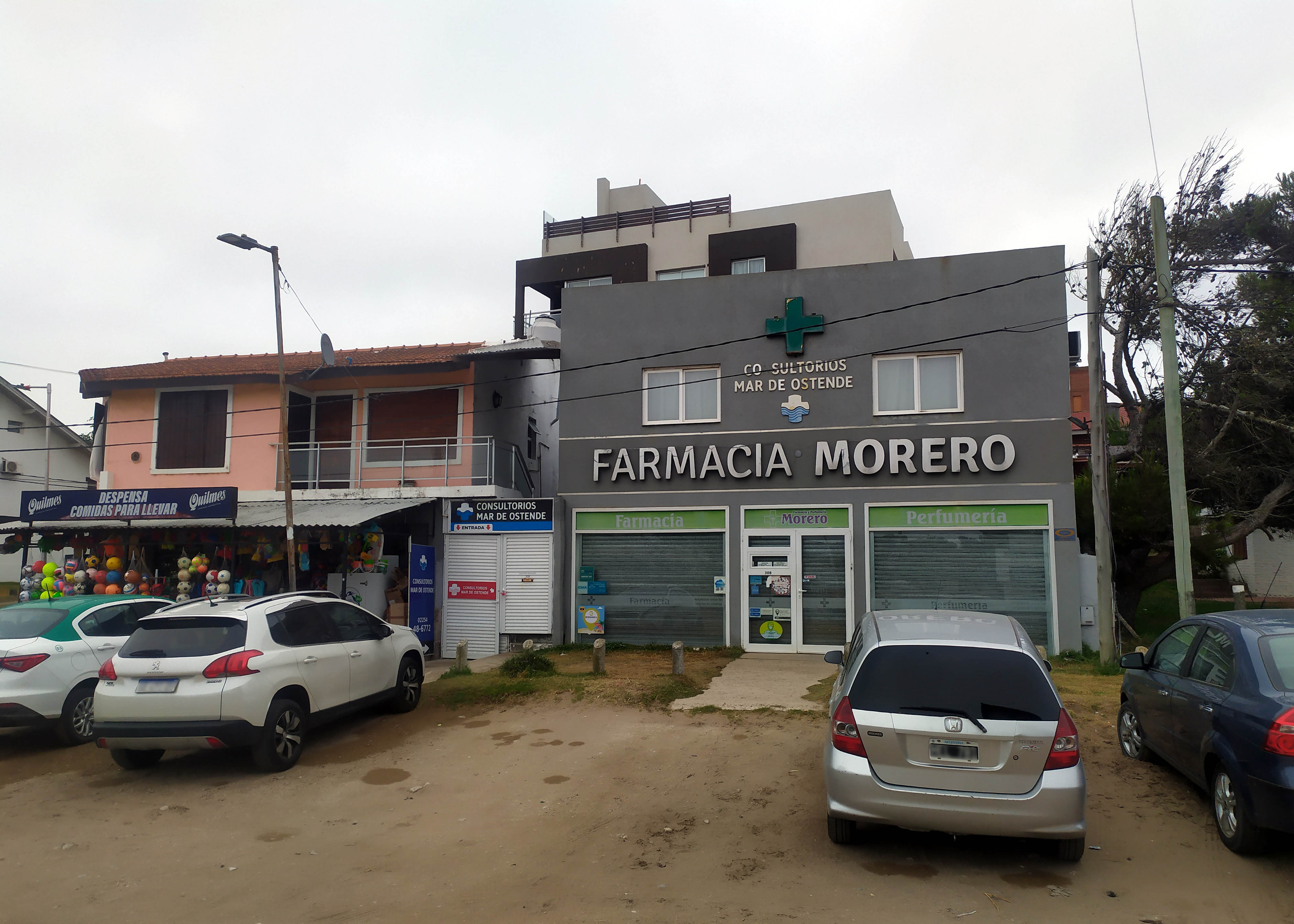
Pharmacy
