= Pinamar =

City in Buenos Aires Province, Argentina

- City
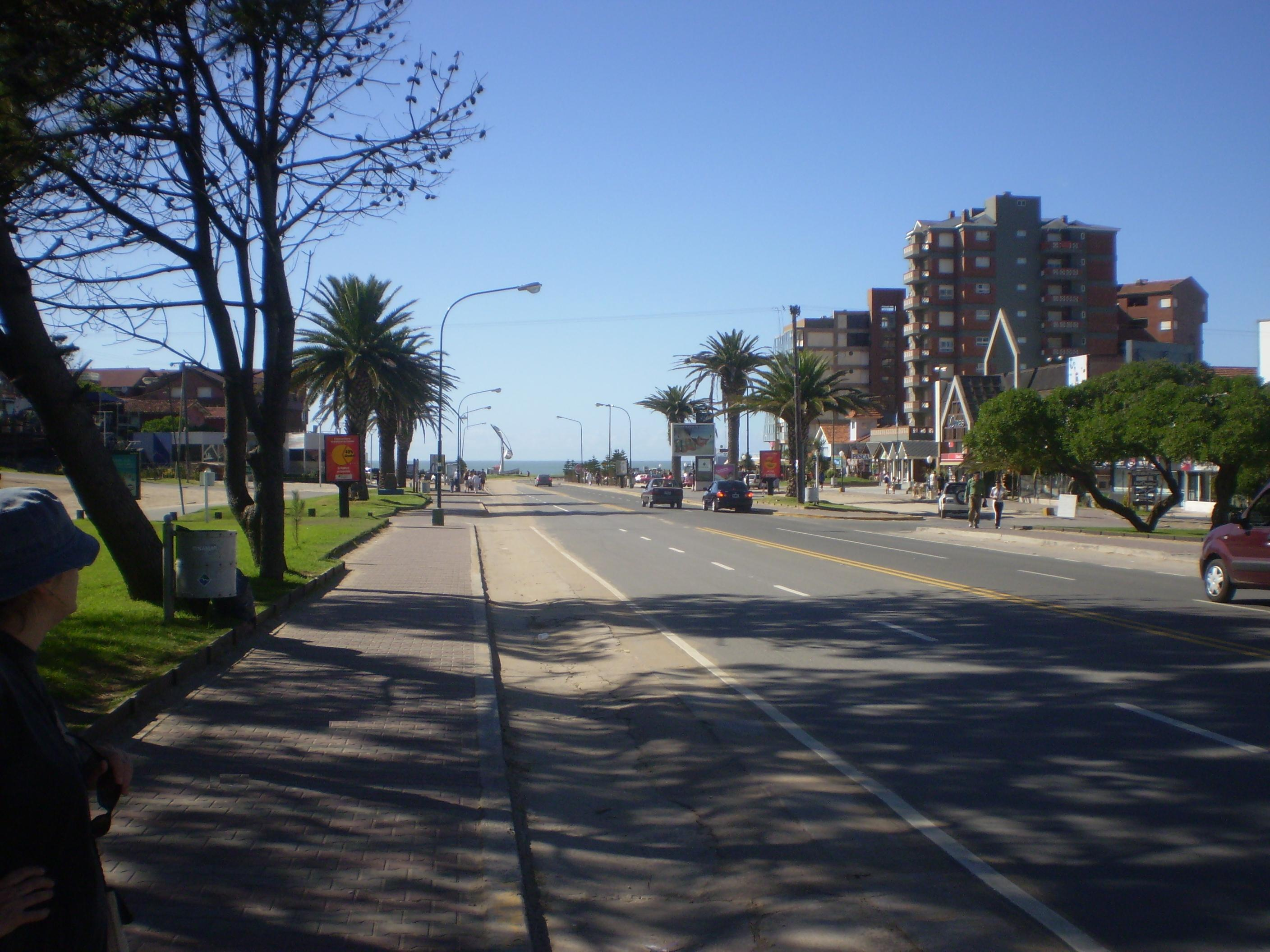
- Avenida Bunge in 2008

- Location in Argentina
- Coordinates: 37°06′S 56°51′W
- Country: Argentina
- Province: Buenos Aires
- Partido: Pinamar
- Founded: February 14, 1943

Government
  - Intendant: Juan Manuel Ibarguren (PRO)
- Elevation: 17 m (56 ft)

Population (2020)
  - Total: 45,000
- CPA Base: B 7167
- Area code: +54 2254
- Website: pinamar.gov.ar

Pinamar is an Argentine resort city of the Atlantic Coast in Buenos Aires Province. It has about 45,000 inhabitants (2020).

Located less than 400 km (249 mi) south of Buenos Aires, it is one of several small seaside communities that line the coast. Since Pinamar's main attraction is the ocean, it is a fairly quiet town during the winter months. Tourism fuels the economy during the summer. Several other coastal towns are right beside Pinamar. If you move south, you will have the towns of Ostende, Valeria del Mar, and finally Cariló.

Two facts set Pinamar apart from most of the other Argentine beach cities: it is a planned city with a very strict building code, and it has been artificially turned from wild sand dunes into a forest (mostly of pine trees, which explains the "pina" in the town's name).

City planning, as defined by founding architect Jorge Bunge and maintained by elected authorities ever since, translates into a city mostly made up of residential houses with open gardens.

Pine planting was originally started in Cariló—a town nearby Villa Gesell and copied in Pinamar, although the city plan for Villa Gesell was not as carefully laid out or kept through the years.

== History ==
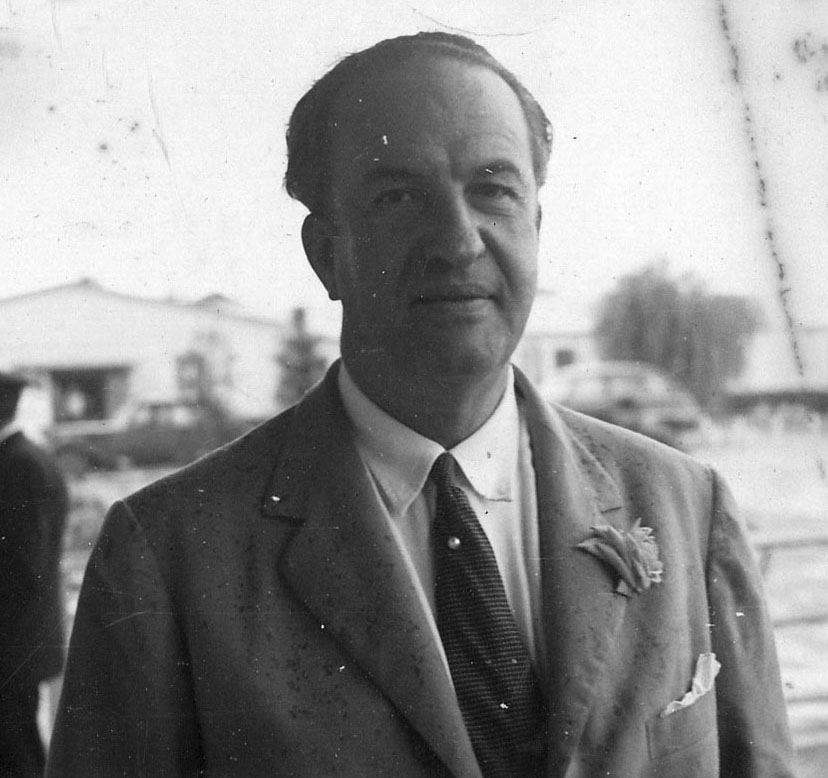
Jorge Bunge, pioneer and founder of Pinamar. His wish of establishing a city in an inhospitable region was carried out due to his enthusiasm and perseverance

In the 19th century, the region where the Pinamar Partido stays nowadays was a desertic area plenty of dunes facing the sea. Those dunes constituted the fields called "Los Montes Grandes de Juancho", which belonged to Don Martín de Alzaga, an older man and landowner, who had married Felicitas Guerrero in 1862, a young woman of only 16 years old.

In 1907, the Buenos Aires Great Southern Railway opened the Juancho station built on lands previously owned by José Guerrero. That station was terminus of a branch from General Guido in the Constitución–Mar del Plata line. The touristic activity would then increase when visitors came to Pinamar via Juancho station (onboarded by horse-drawn carriages which took them to the respective towns).

In the last years of the 30's, architect Jorge Bunge, a visionary man, associated with Valeria Guerrero, owner of the land and Felicitas's niece, both formed a partnership and Bunge created an urban design as particular as innovative, tracing the streets in the form of arabesques and curves to respect the dunes and undulations of the landscape. These lands were dunes that formed a barrier to the sea. Bunge, who had studied not only architecture and engineering but also urban planning in Nicaragua, towards the end of the 1930s thought of fixing the dunes, property of Valeria Guerrero, reforesting and urbanizing them. He studied the characteristics and possibilities of the area, taking into account that a railway branch already existed. He shaped his project with a company called "Pinamar S.A.", together with Guerrero and Franco Moschella. They were joined by a group of people, including men from the countryside, industrialists and professionals motivated by the desire to overcome a real challenge.

In 1940, studies and preliminary tests began, as well as the essential basic constructions to provide infrastructure for the project. One year later, the fixation and afforestation of the dunes began on a large scale with unprecedented methods for Argentina. By 1942 urbanization began; the road network was extended, houses were built for the company's hierarchical personnel and specific studies on the natural resources and climatic characteristics of the place were completed, essential data for the realization of the Master Plan that would project the integral conformation of the landscape required.

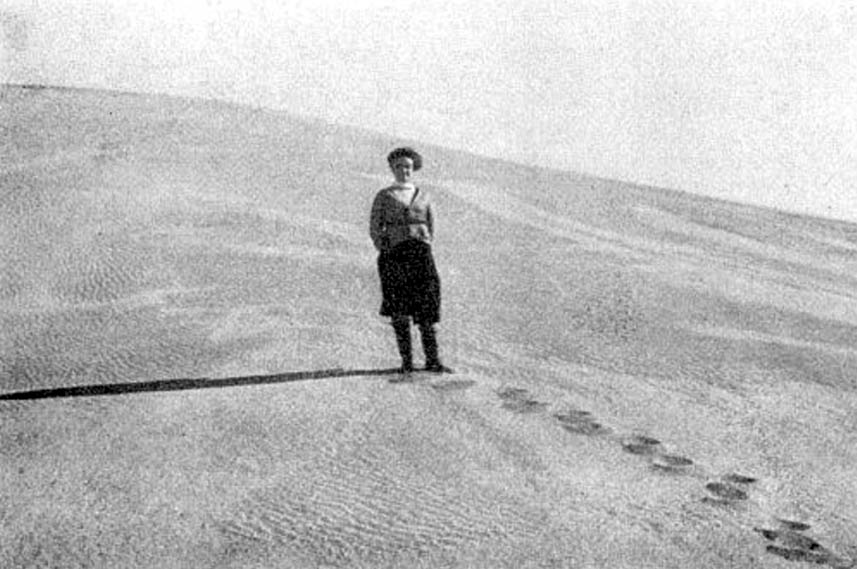
Valeria Guerrero, descendant of one of the landowners in the region, associated Bunge to found a city

On February 14, 1943, Pinamar was inaugurated as a spa and opened to the public. The "Playas Hotel", the Electric Plant and a small Shopping Center were built and inaugurated. The plantations continued to continue fixing their dunes. Fractions of land were donated for the construction of the School, the First Aid Room, the Civic Center, the Police Detachment, the Weather Station and the Church. A factory for roof tiles, tiles and other elements for construction was built. The provincial road (route 11) was completed.

In 1944, the Master Plan was presented to the Province of Buenos Aires, which was approved. The differential road network was extended with the paving of the main streets of Pinamar. Electrical networks and running water were laid, and simultaneously the first areas were definitively urbanized. In 1945, the first lots were sold and construction began on a core of permanent homes and summer homes. In that same year, the first golf course, the School, the first aid room, the Church of Our Lady of Peace, the Water and Light Cooperative, the public telephone, the post office and the original pier were inaugurated.

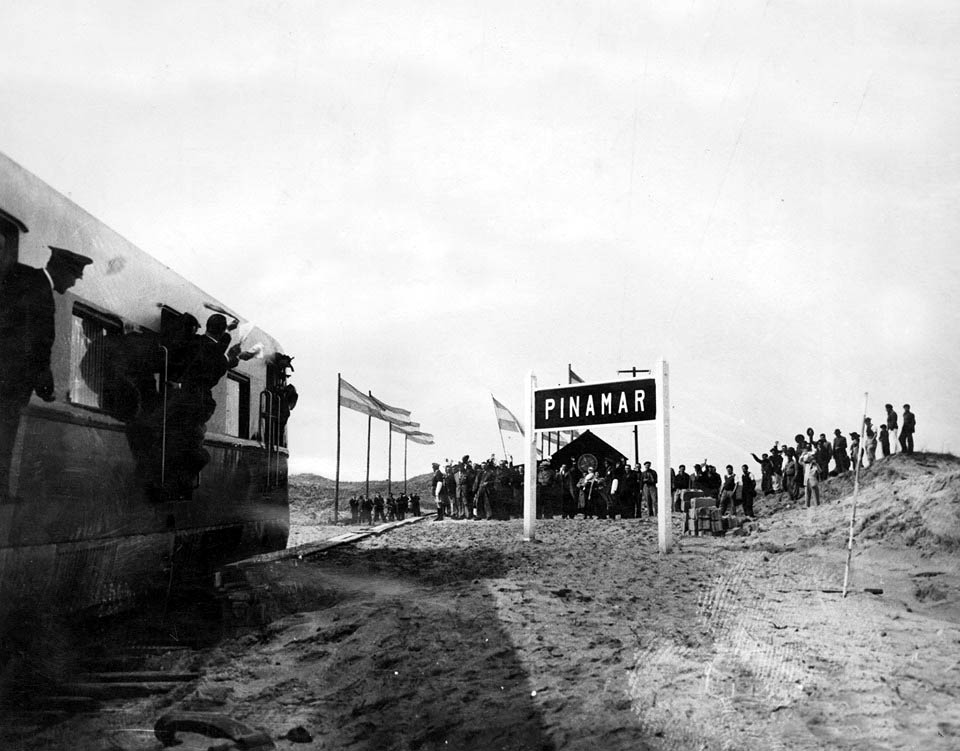
Inauguration of the Pinamar railway station, August 1949. It was closed in 1967

When the entire railway network in Argentina was nationalised in Argentina in 1948, managers of Ferrocarriles Argentinos thought about using the old freight branches operated by the BAGSR for a passenger service to Pinamar. After some studies, works began and in August 1949, the first Constitución – Pinamar service was opened to public. The Pinamar station was placed where today stays a park, on Av. Constitución e/ Apolo y Av. Intemedanos.

The first services were run by Ganz railcars that had been also used by the Argentine State Railway to run services to Bariloche. However, subsecquent services to Pinamar would be run by Drewry vehicles. The Constitución – Pinamar service was run for 18 years until December 12, 1967, when the service was definitely closed. Tracks were lifted in the 1970s.

Bunge died in 1961. One year later, the Telephone Cooperativa was established. On July 1, 1978, the "Pinamar Partido was established through Provincial Law 9,024. The Partido (now independent of General Madariaga Partido) integrated the cities of Pinamar, Ostende, Valeria del Mar, and Cariló, among other small towns.

In 1991 the Governor of Buenos Aires Province, Eduardo Duhalde, expressed his intention to reactivate the Gral. Guido – Gral. Madariaga service (those tracks had not been removed) also stating that the government was studying to extend the line to Pinamar. Services to General Madariaga were reactivated in May 1994, being operated by state-owned Ferrobaires, a company established by the province to operate passenger trains in the territory after Carlos Menem's administration closed all the services in March 1993.

Between 1994 and 1996 new tracks were added from Gral. Madariaga and a new station named "Divisadero de Pinamar". The new station was built 1,5 km from the Route 11 (west direction) and more distant than the original Pinamar station closed in 1967 to avoid a level crossing on a highly trafficked route. Divisadero de Pinamar was inaugurated on December 7, 1996.

== Climate ==
Climate data for Pinamar
Month	Jan	Feb	Mar	Apr	May	Jun	Jul	Aug	Sep	Oct	Nov	Dec	Year
Mean daily maximum °C (°F)	25.8 (78.4)	25.0 (77.0)	23.6 (74.5)	20.4 (68.7)	17.0 (62.6)	13.6 (56.5)	13.3 (55.9)	14.3 (57.7)	16.1 (61.0)	18.8 (65.8)	21.7 (71.1)	25.0 (77.0)	19.6 (67.3)
Daily mean °C (°F)	20.4 (68.7)	20.1 (68.2)	18.9 (66.0)	15.3 (59.5)	12.4 (54.3)	9.1 (48.4)	8.6 (47.5)	9.3 (48.7)	11.4 (52.5)	13.8 (56.8)	16.1 (61.0)	19.4 (66.9)	14.6 (58.3)
Mean daily minimum °C (°F)	15.8 (60.4)	15.5 (59.9)	14.6 (58.3)	10.6 (51.1)	8.5 (47.3)	5.3 (41.5)	4.8 (40.6)	4.9 (40.8)	6.9 (44.4)	9.3 (48.7)	11.1 (52.0)	14.4 (57.9)	10.1 (50.2)
Average precipitation mm (inches)	136 (5.4)	54 (2.1)	86 (3.4)	69 (2.7)	90 (3.5)	46 (1.8)	57 (2.2)	50 (2.0)	54 (2.1)	62 (2.4)	72 (2.8)	119 (4.7)	895 (35.2)
Average precipitation days	10	8	9	9	10	9	9	9	8	10	10	10	111
Average relative humidity (%)	70	72	74	76	79	79	81	76	77	73	69	70	75
Source: Servicio Meteorológico Nacional

== Transport ==
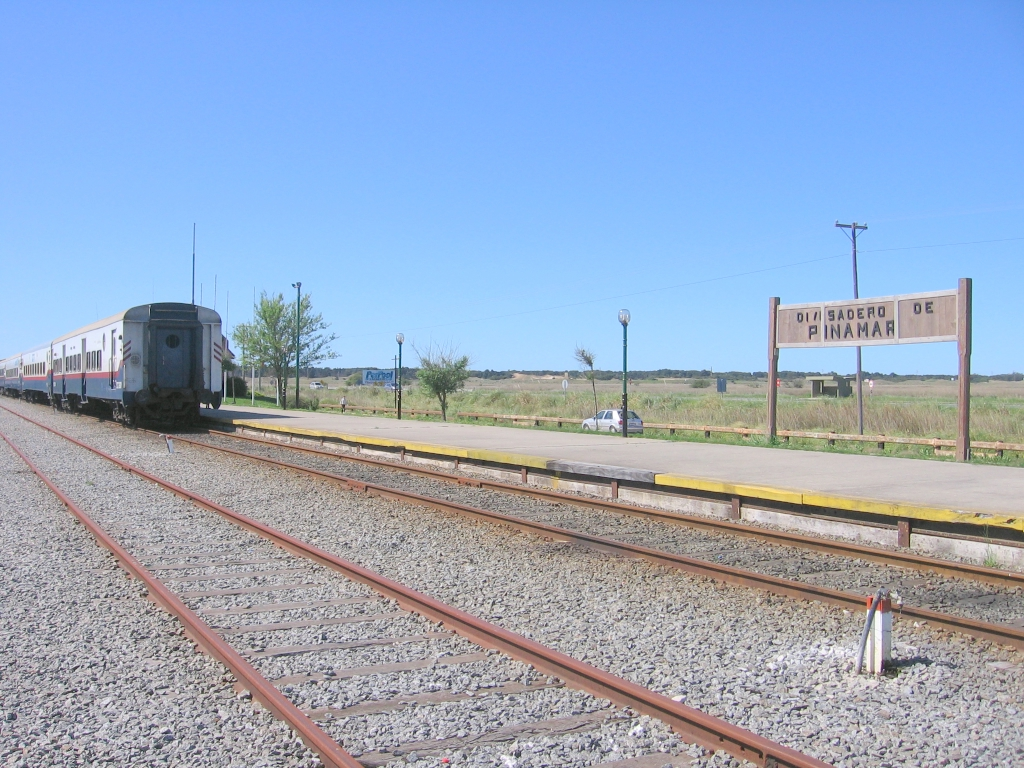
Divisadero de Pinamar station, opened in 1996. It is distant 2km from the city, west direction

Pinamar was one of the few cities of the Argentine Atlantic Coast to have a railway service when the Pinamar station was opened in 1949. It operated for 18 years until on December 12, 1967, the service was definitely closed.

Nowadays, visitors can arrive by train from Constitución station to Divisadero de Pinamar station (opened in 1996 and operated by state-owned Trenes Argentinos) and making an onward connection by bus to the city, distant about 2 km from the station.

The bus terminal is located on Avenida Ingeniero Budge and Del Bosque.

== Interesting facts ==
On July 2, 2019, the world's first webcam observation of the total solar eclipse below the horizon took place from this city, which was at the extension of the 2019 total solar eclipse.

== Gallery ==
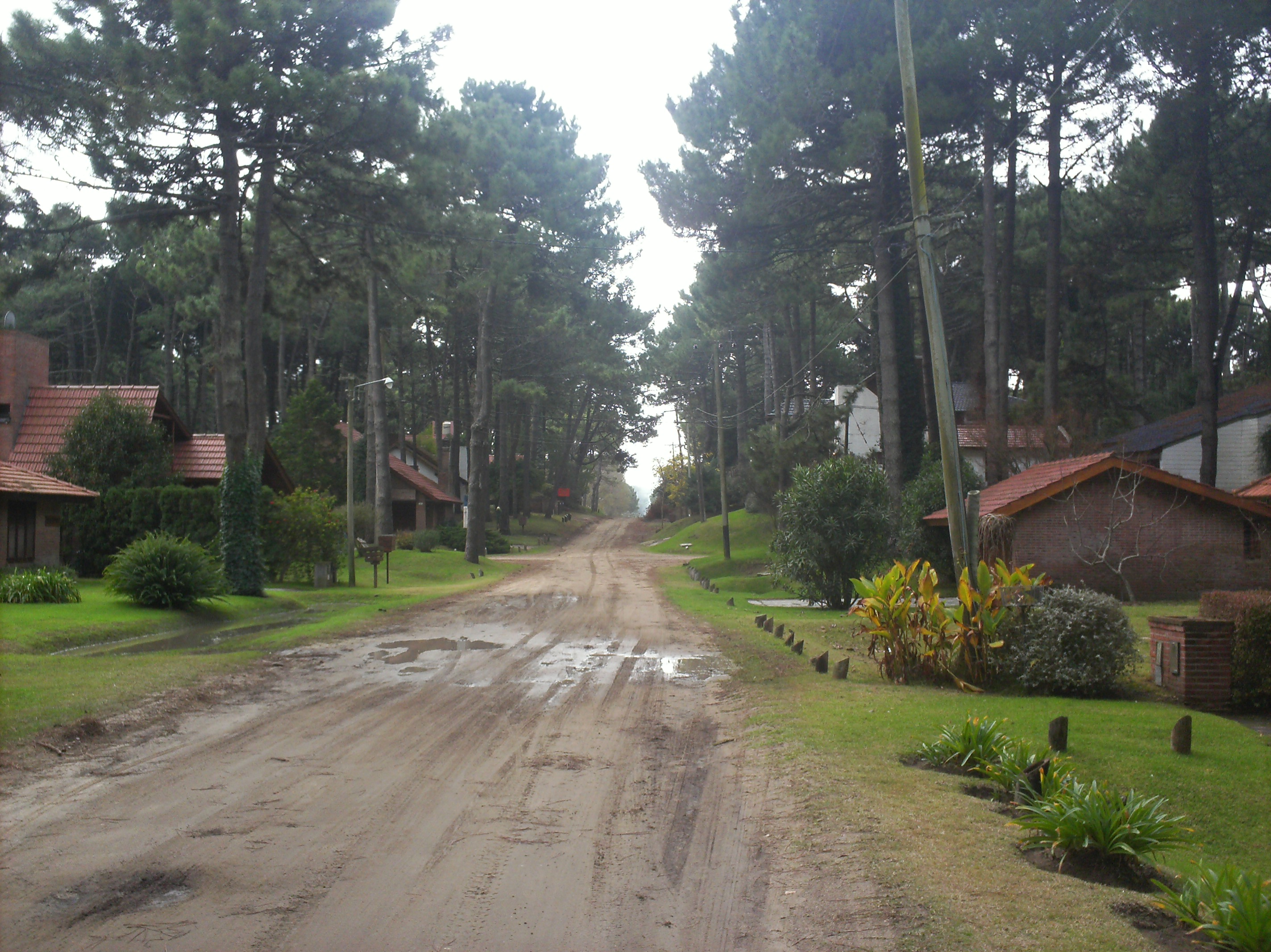
Nautilus Street

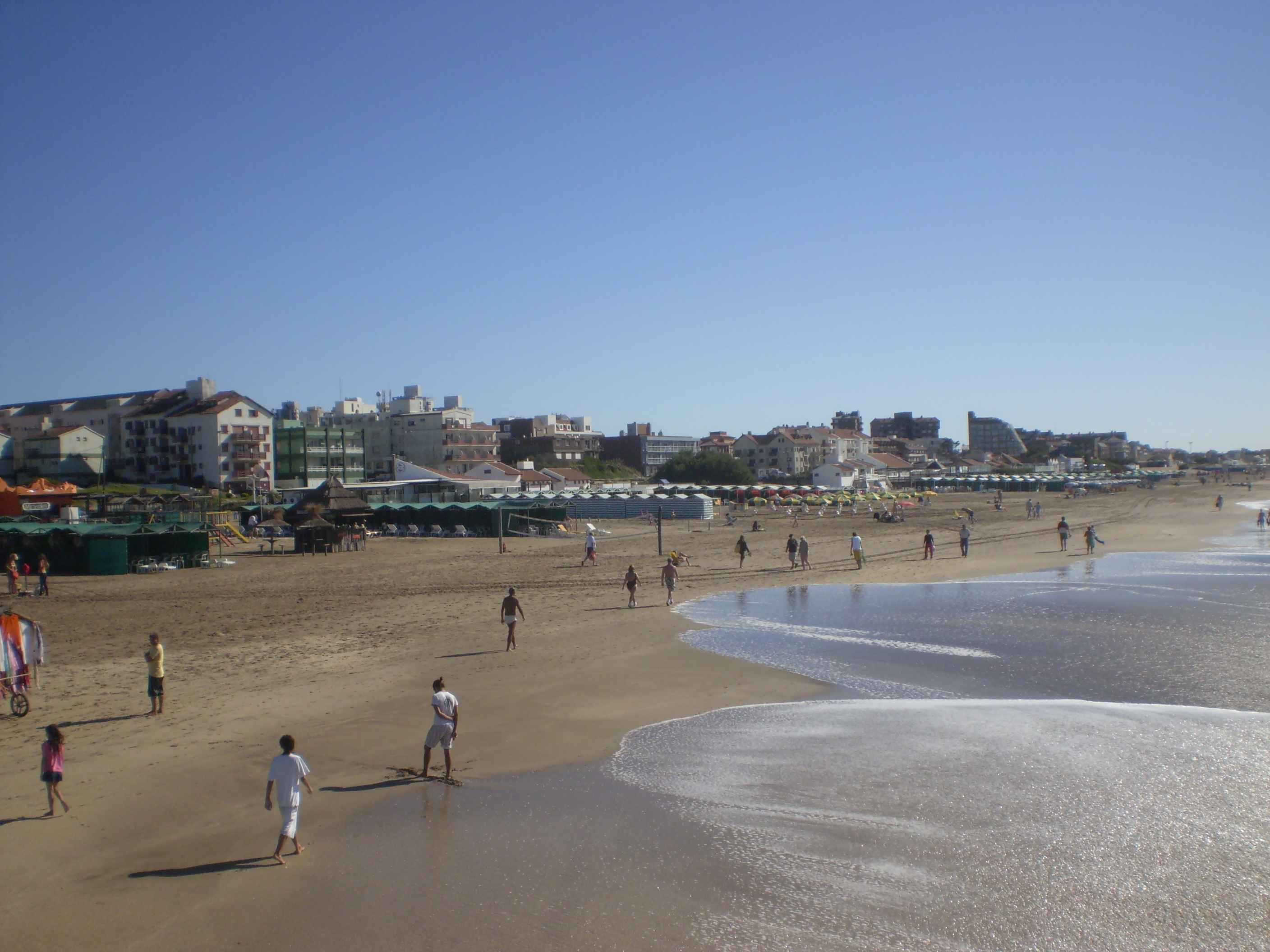
View of the beach from the pier

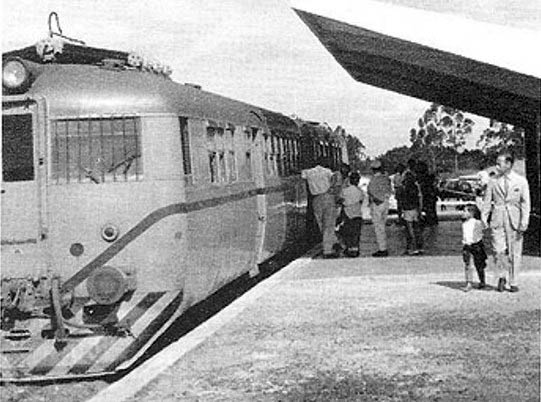
Former train station (1949)

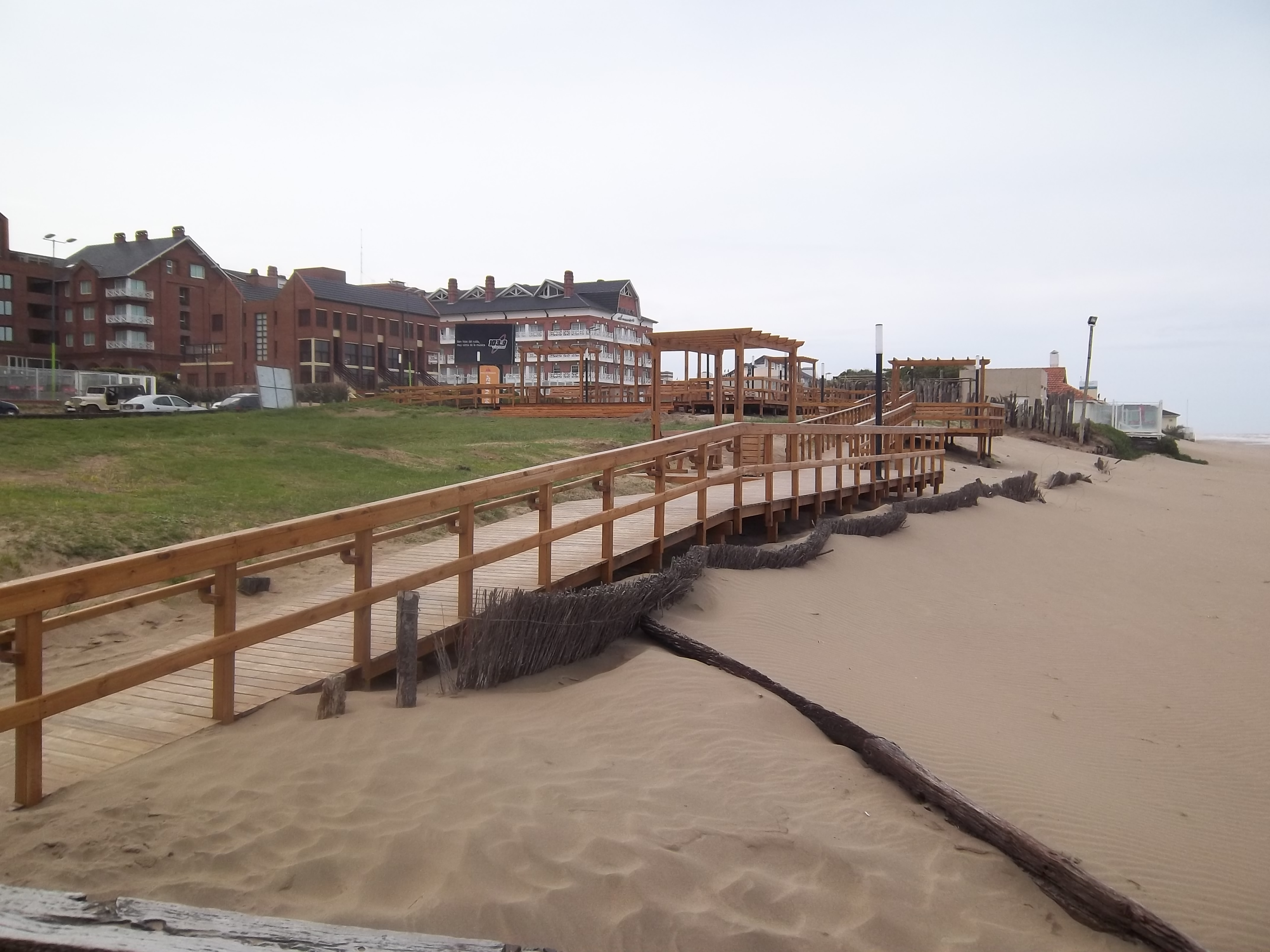
Wooden boardwalk

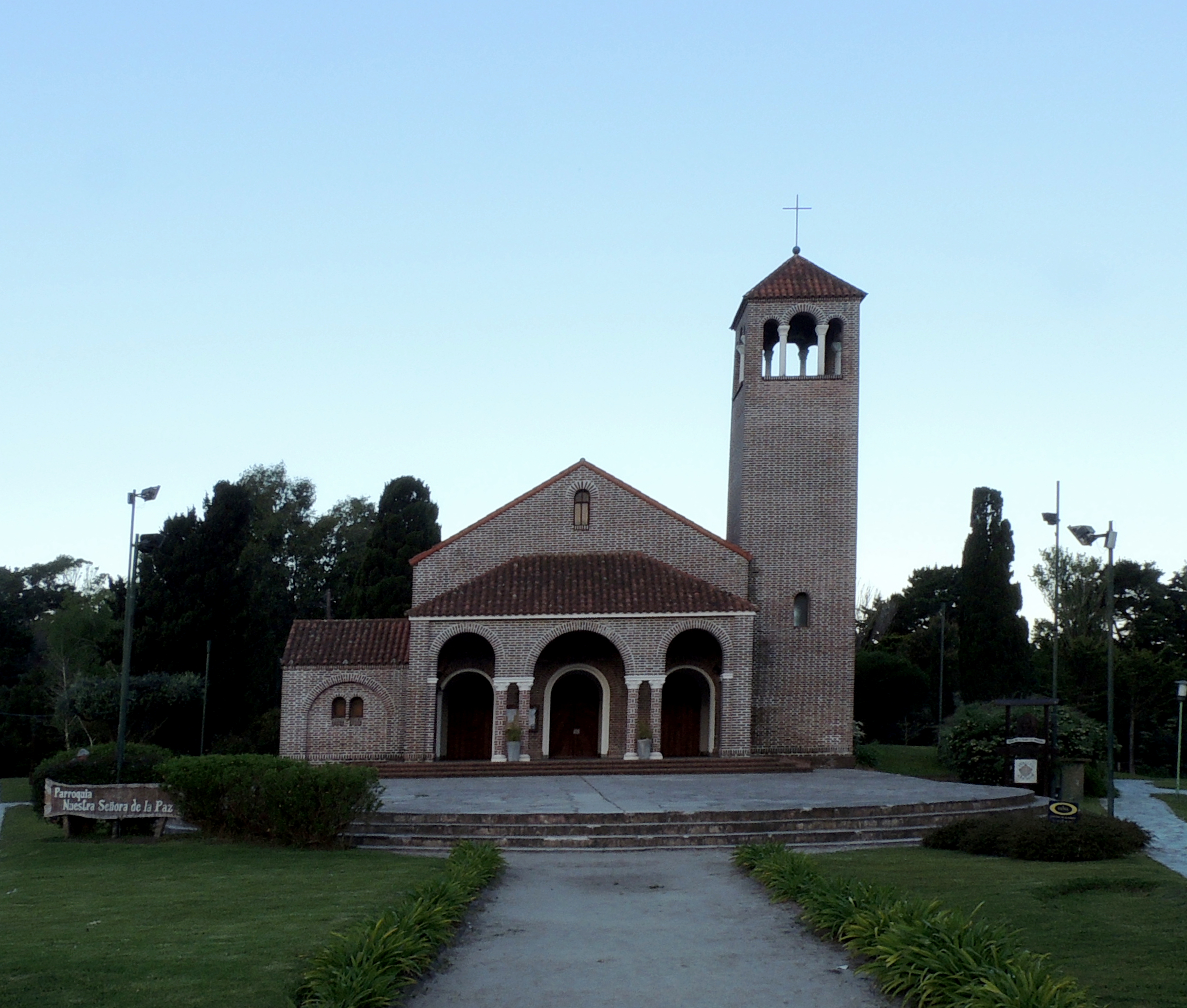
Parroquia Ntra. Sra. de la Paz

Aerial view

== Sister cities ==
- Myrtle Beach, United States
- Oostende, Belgium

== See also ==
- Pinamar Partido
- Pinamar railway station (1949)
- Divisadero de Pinamar railway station
- List of twin towns and sister cities in Argentina
