= General Juan Madariaga =

- Location in Argentina
- Coordinates: 37°01′S 57°08′W
- Country: Argentina
- Province: Buenos Aires
- Partido: General Madariaga
- Founded: 8 December 1907

Population (2001 census [INDEC])
  - Total: 16,763
- CPA Base: B 7163
- Area code: +54 22267

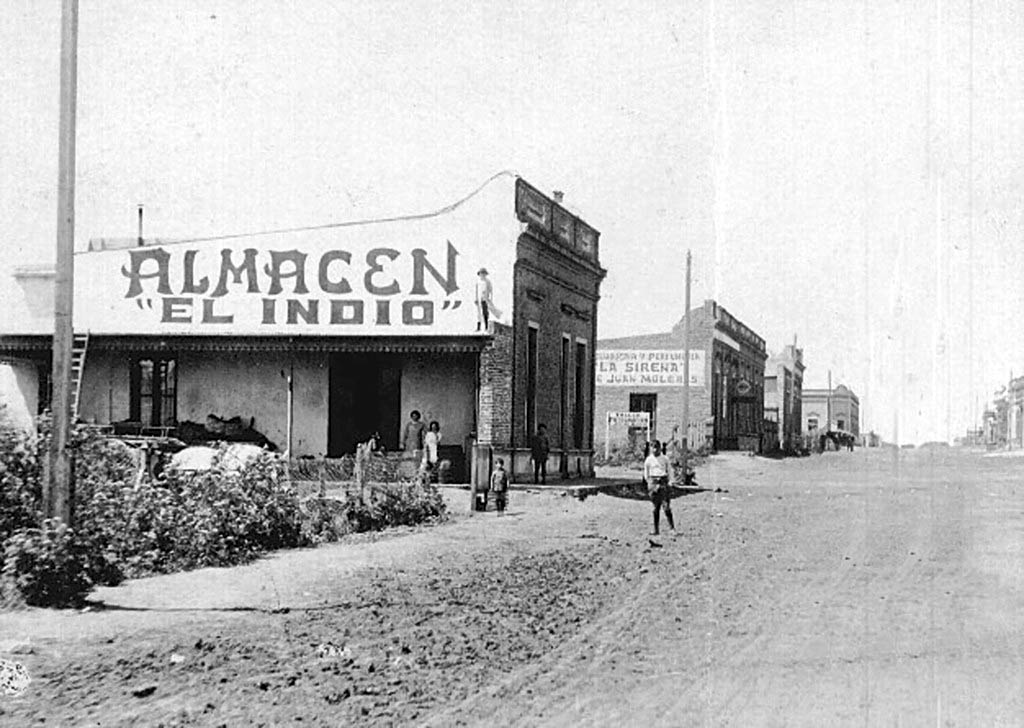
A street of General Madariaga, with a few stores (1918).

General Juan Madariaga (Spanish pronunciation: [xeneˈɾal ˈxwam maðaˈɾjaɣa]) is a town in Buenos Aires Province, Argentina. It is the administrative centre for General Madariaga Partido.

The settlement was established on December 8, 1907.
