= General Madariaga Partido =

General Juan Madariaga Partido de General Juan Madariaga
- Department
- Coat of arms

- location of General Madariaga Partido in Buenos Aires Province
- Coordinates: 37°00′07″S 57°08′10″W
- Country: Argentina
- Established: 8 December 1907
- Named for: Juan Madariaga
- Seat: General Juan Madariaga

Government
  - Intendant: Esteban Santoro (UCR)

Area
  - Total: 286.3 km^{2} (110.5 sq mi)

Population
  - Total: 18,286
  - Density: 63.87/km^{2} (165.4/sq mi)
- Demonym: madariaguense
- Postal Code: B7163
- IFAM: BUE047
- Area Code: 02267
- Patron saint: Sagrado Corazón de Jesús
- Website: madariaga.gob.ar

General Madariaga Partido (Spanish pronunciation: [xeneˈɾal maðaˈɾjaɣa]) (also known as General Juan Madariaga Partido) is a partido located on the Atlantic coast of Buenos Aires Province in Argentina.

This provincial subdivision had a population of about 22,600 inhabitants in 2022. The area is 286.3 km^{2} (111 sq mi).

== Economy ==
The economy of General Madariaga Partido is concentrated around agricultural production, although in the summer vacation season (December–February) tourism offers a valuable addition to the economy.
