= Argentine Atlantic Coast =

Atlantic Coast Costa Atlántica (Spanish)
- Tourism region
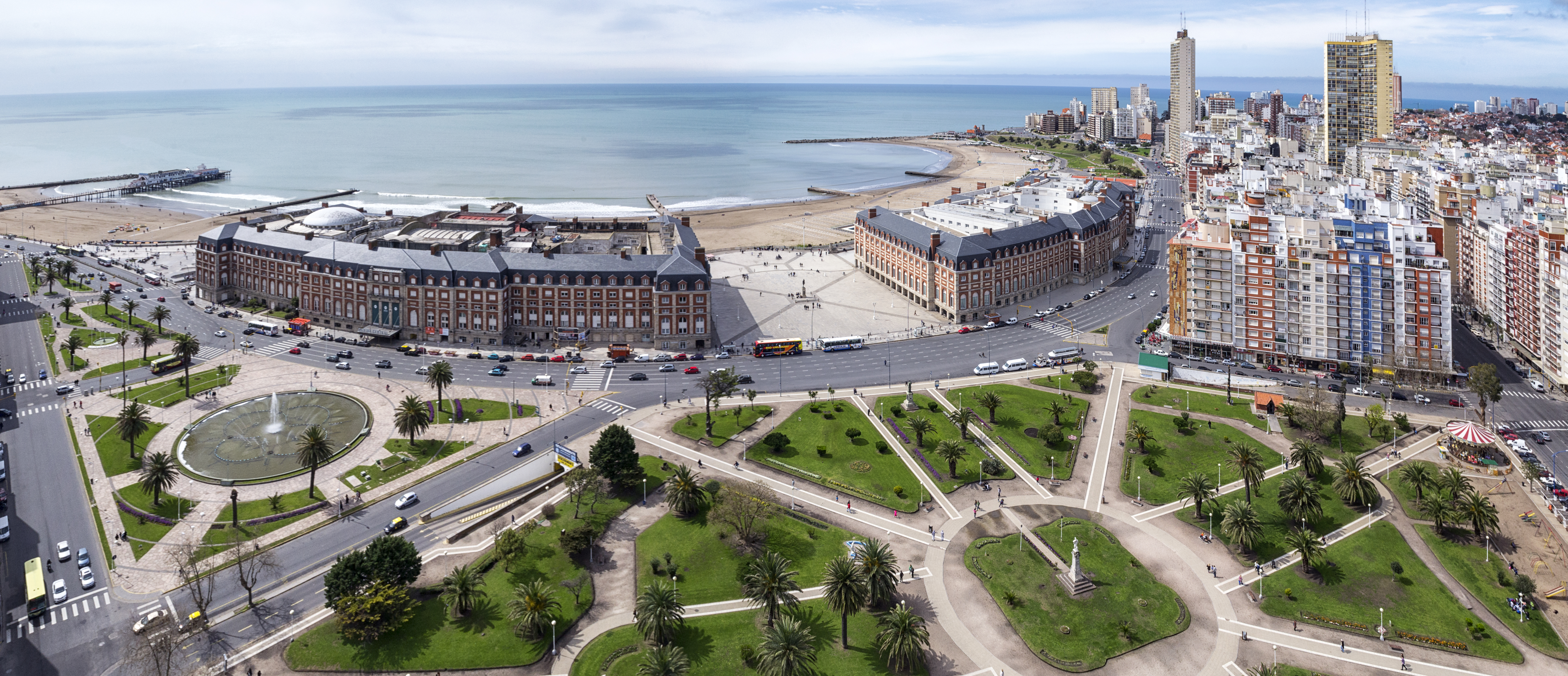
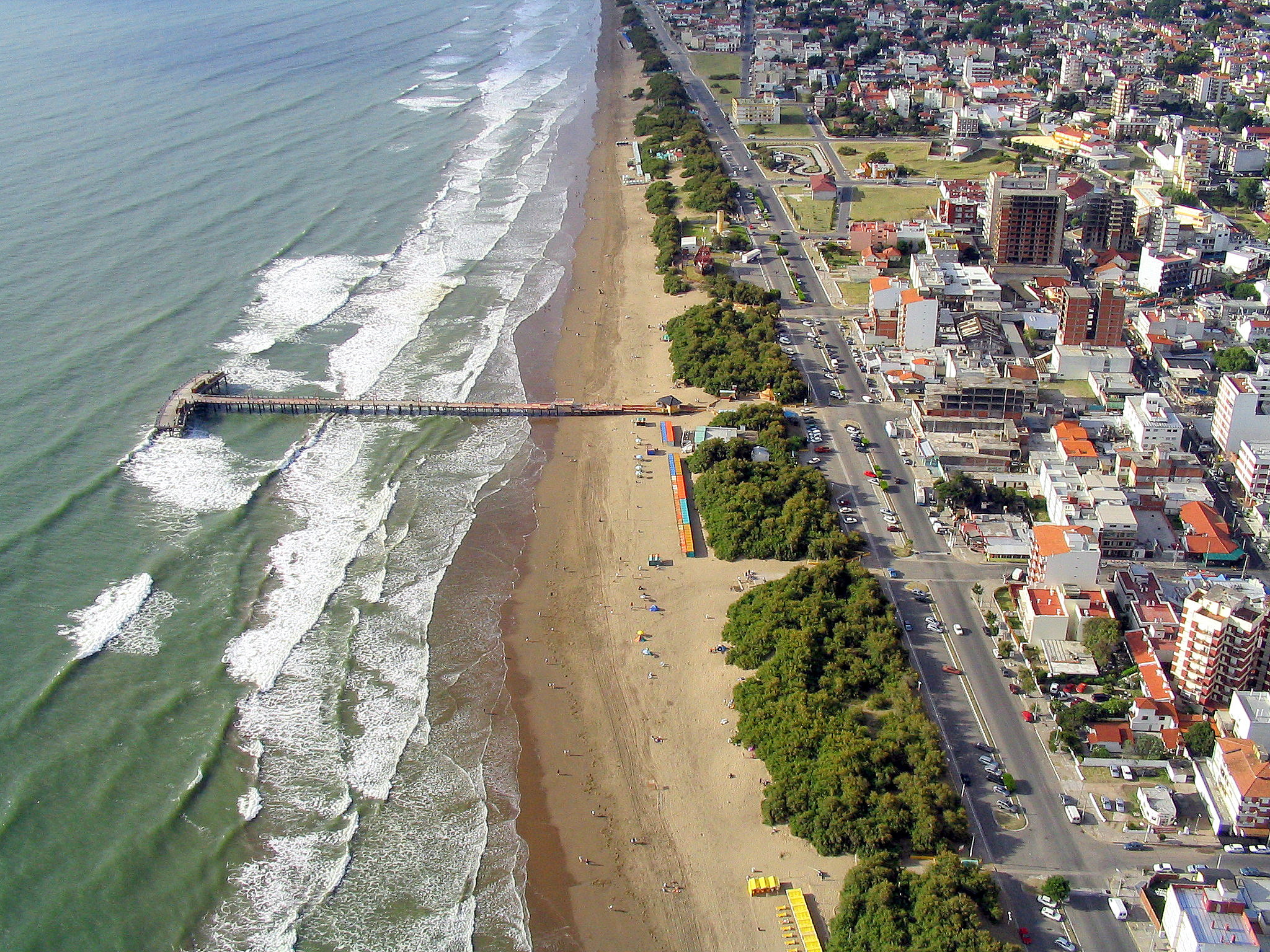
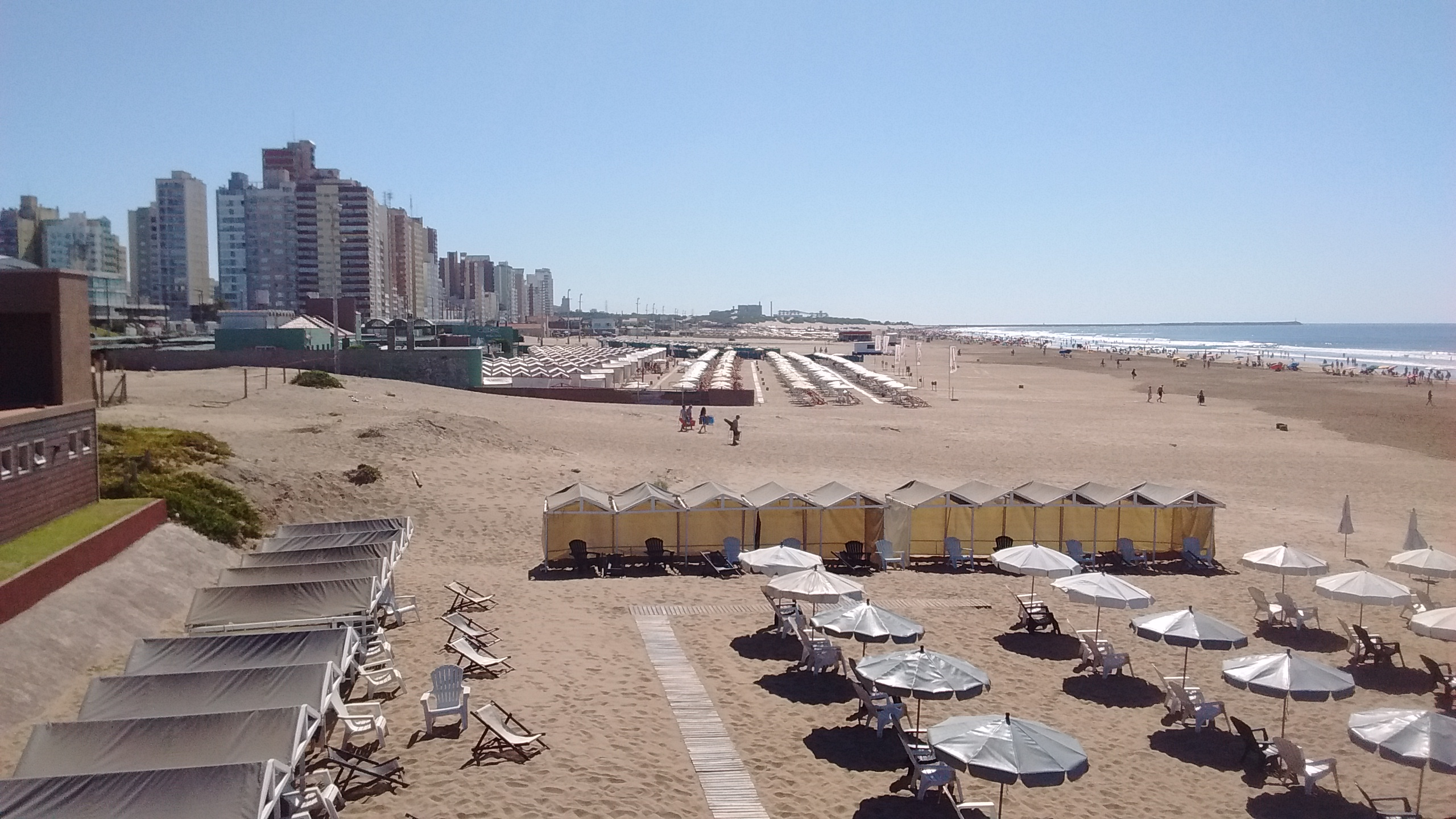
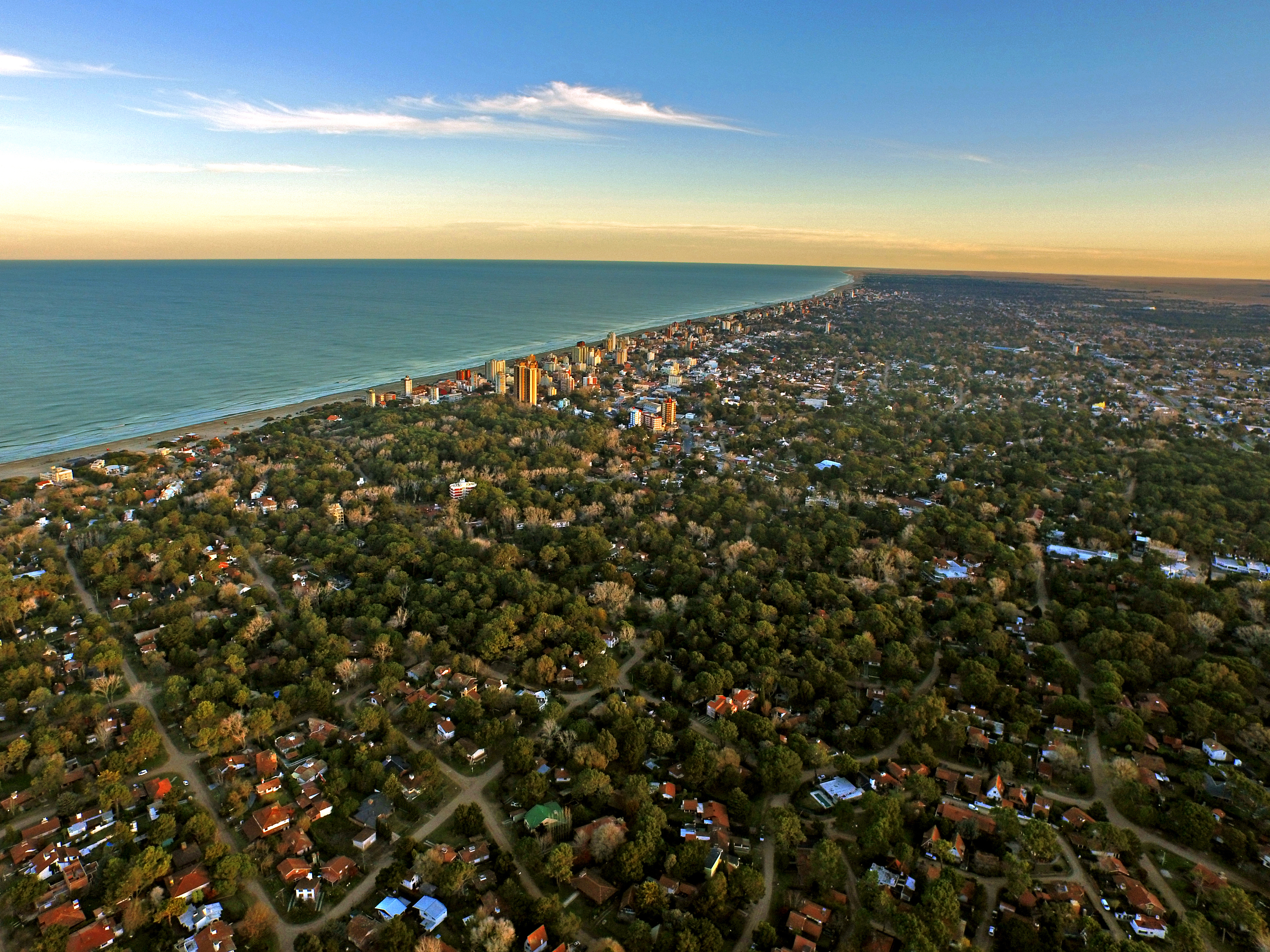
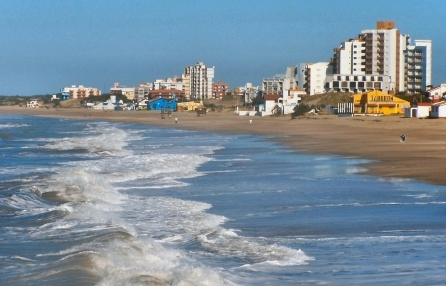
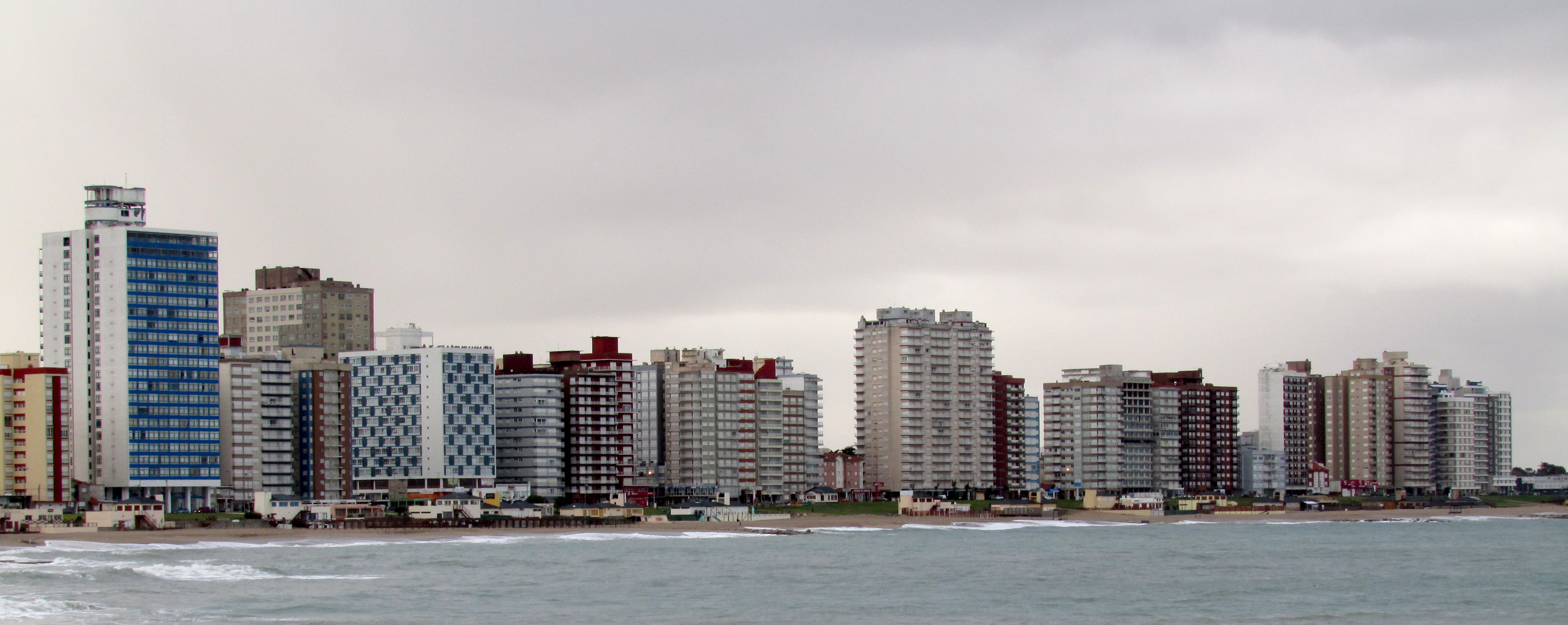
- Mar del Plata Santa Teresita Necochea Villa Gesell Pinamar Miramar
- Country: Argentina
- Province: Buenos Aires
- Partidos (i.e., municipalities): La Costa; Pinamar; Villa Gesell; Mar Chiquita; General Pueyrredón; General Alvarado; Lobería; Necochea; San Cayetano; Tres Arroyos; Coronel Dorrego; Monte Hermoso; Coronel Rosales

In Argentina, especially in tourism-related contexts, the term Atlantic Coast (Spanish: Costa Atlántica), or simply "the Coast" (la Costa), commonly refers to the Atlantic frontage of the Pampas plain in Buenos Aires Province, characterized by a chain of seaside resorts for beachgoing along the Argentine Sea in the South Atlantic Ocean. The tourist corridor's sandy beaches, temperate climate and wide range of tourist services have made it the country's main vacation destination, particularly during the summer season, which in Argentina runs from December to March. The city of Mar del Plata serves as the main regional hub and the country's quintessential tourist city, being the most visited destination by domestic tourists and the second most visited overall after the city of Buenos Aires. The term "Atlantic Coast" may also be used more broadly to include the country's entire Atlantic coastline, extending into Patagonia; for this reason, the expressions "Buenos Aires Atlantic coast" (costa atlántica bonaerense) or "Pampas Atlantic coast" (costa atlántica pampeana) are sometimes used, in contrast to "Patagonian Atlantic coast" (costa atlántica patagónica), to distinguish between these areas. On the Atlantic coast of Patagonia, resort towns with sandy beaches suitable for beach tourism are concentrated in Río Negro Province, the northernmost province of the region, with Las Grutas as the main seaside resort; further south, the coastline is largely encompassed by protected areas and attracts a different type of tourism focused on scenic landscapes, sightseeing and wildlife observation, such as on the Valdés Peninsula.

The coastline of Buenos Aires Province developed primarily as a leisure and recreation area for the Buenos Aires Metropolitan Area, the country's main demographic and economic center, a dynamic that has limited the diversification of local economic activities beyond tourism. The area became a new territorial frontier driven by the tourist appeal of the city of Mar del Plata, founded in 1874, which emerged as the epicenter of the region. Until then, the area had been sparsely populated and largely consisted of the coastal edges of large estancias with little livestock-related productive value. Originating as a settlement around a saladero, Mar del Plata became the preferred tourist destination of the Buenos Aires elite in the late 19th and early 20th centuries, and in the following decades developed into a mass tourism destination for broader sectors of society. Its tourism boom, together with the valorization of the coastal edge of large estancias for real estate purposes, fostered the emergence of nearby seaside resorts. During the late 19th century, seaside resorts first appeared to the south, including Necochea (1881), Miramar (1888) and Mar del Sur (1889). In the 20th century, a marked phase of tourist expansion followed, particularly toward the north of Mar del Plata, producing increasing territorial fragmentation and the creation of new developments; among the most notable are Ostende (1908), Cariló (1918), Villa Gesell (1931), Mar de Ajó (1934), San Clemente del Tuyú (1935), San Bernardo (1943) and Pinamar (1943).

== Atlantic Coast of Buenos Aires ==
=== History and development ===
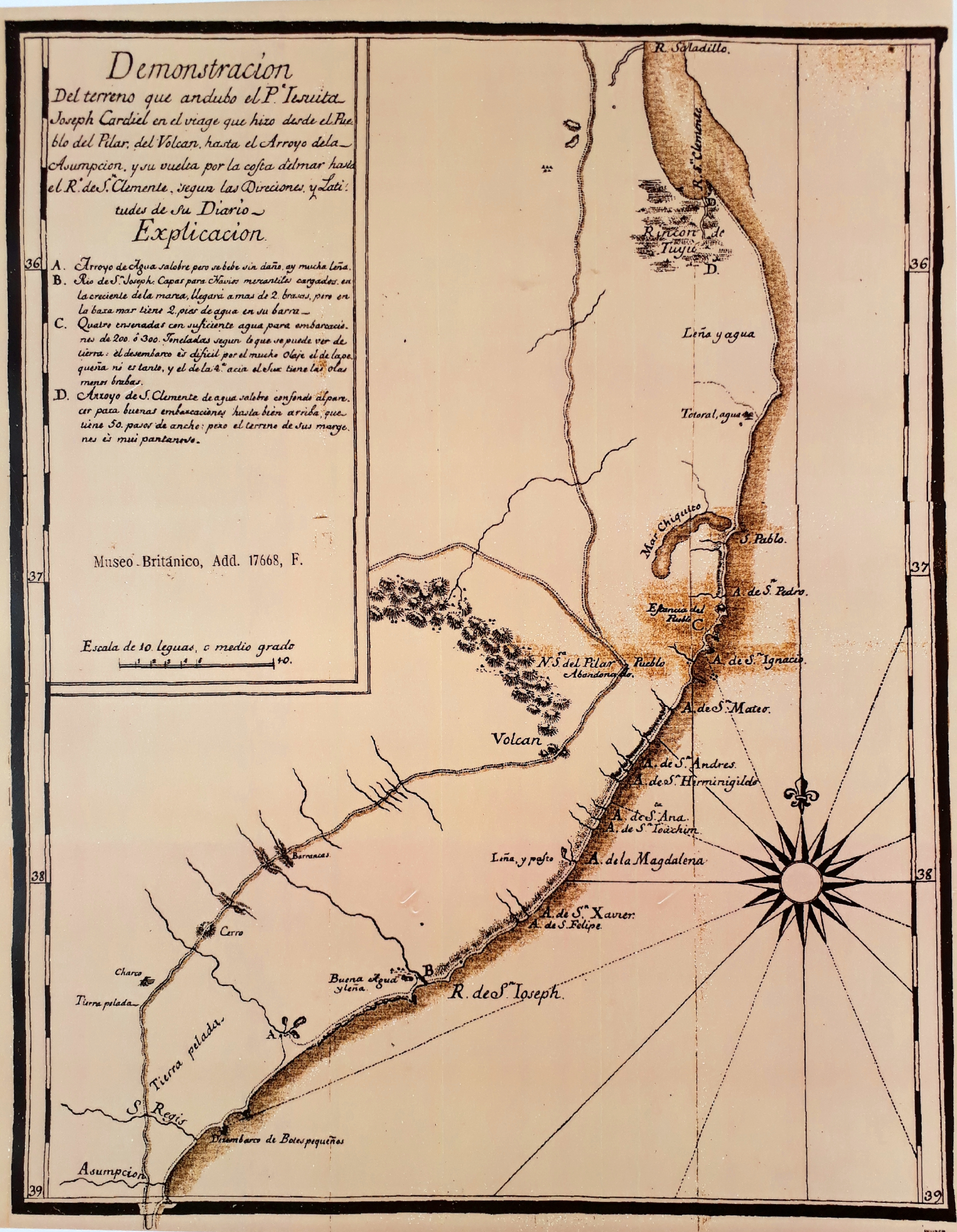
Map of the coastline of Buenos Aires Province by Jesuit missionary José Cardiel, 1766.

Archaeological research indicates that the southeastern sector of Buenos Aires Province's Atlantic coast—between Mar Chiquita lagoon and the mouth of the Quequén Salado River—was used by pre-Hispanic hunter-gatherers throughout the middle and late Holocene, including dune fields and adjacent plains, with evidence of coastal burials dating back at least 7,600 years BP. Studies of material remains and paleodiet (including stable-isotope analysis) further suggest strong links between coastal and inland contexts in the Pampas, with broadly similar lifeways and largely continental diets, although with temporal variation in the use of marine resources. Although European contact with the coastal zone began early, it did not initially lead to permanent settlement. Ferdinand Magellan named Punta de Arena Gordas (present-day Punta Mogotes) in 1519, and Juan de Garay later entered the area by land in 1581–1582, yet neither expedition established lasting populations. The first sustained attempt at settlement occurred in 1747, when Jesuit missionaries Matías Strobel, Tomás Falkner and José Cardiel founded the mission of Nuestra Señora del Pilar near Laguna Las Cabrillas (now Laguna de los Padres), which gathered a sizable indigenous population before being abandoned in 1751 amid conflicts with non-missionized groups and the declining influence of the Jesuit order. As a result, for most of the colonial period, the coastal zone thus remained part of a broad frontier controlled by indigenous groups, with Spanish authority largely confined to Buenos Aires and a limited network of forts and missions, and with only intermittent penetration into the southern Pampas, within what recent historiography describes as a fluid and porous frontier space, where zones of interaction advanced and retreated over time rather than forming a fixed boundary.

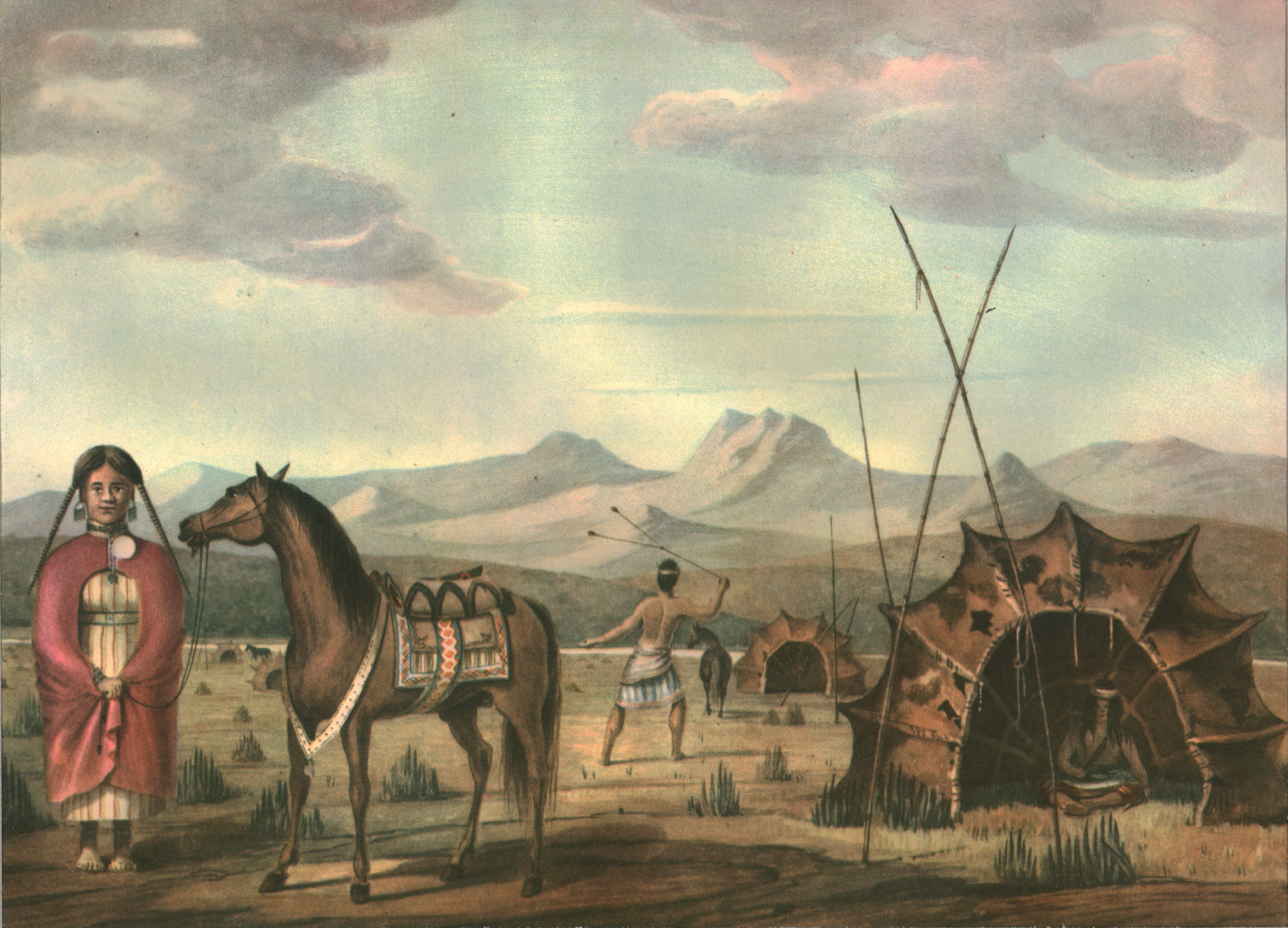
Camp of indigenous peoples of the Pampas near Sierra de la Ventana, as depicted by Charles Pellegrini in 1830.

More enduring European occupation therefore only developed gradually from the Buenos Aires hinterland. Although the 1810 May Revolution in the city of Buenos Aires broke colonial ties with Spain and independence was declared in 1816, internal pacification and the consolidation of a unified national space took several more decades and only stabilized toward the mid-19th century. From the 1820s onward, the provincial state began a more systematic expansion toward the south, aimed at securing land and resources for cattle ranching and extending effective sovereignty over territories still dominated by indigenous groups, combining military action with negotiated arrangements. During that century, state consolidation promoted a more effective occupation of lands south of the Salado River, closely linked to changing regimes of land appropriation and tenure. Frontier expansion involved both coercive campaigns and the so-called "negocio pacífico de indios" ("peaceful affair with the Indians"), a system of asymmetric exchange through which allied indigenous groups received livestock, goods and supplies in return for military support, auxiliary services and relative territorial proximity to forts and settlements, while retaining political autonomy. Despite these arrangements, frontier areas remained vulnerable to conflict and instability, which in many areas discouraged permanent family settlement in many coastal and southern districts during the first half of the 19th century.

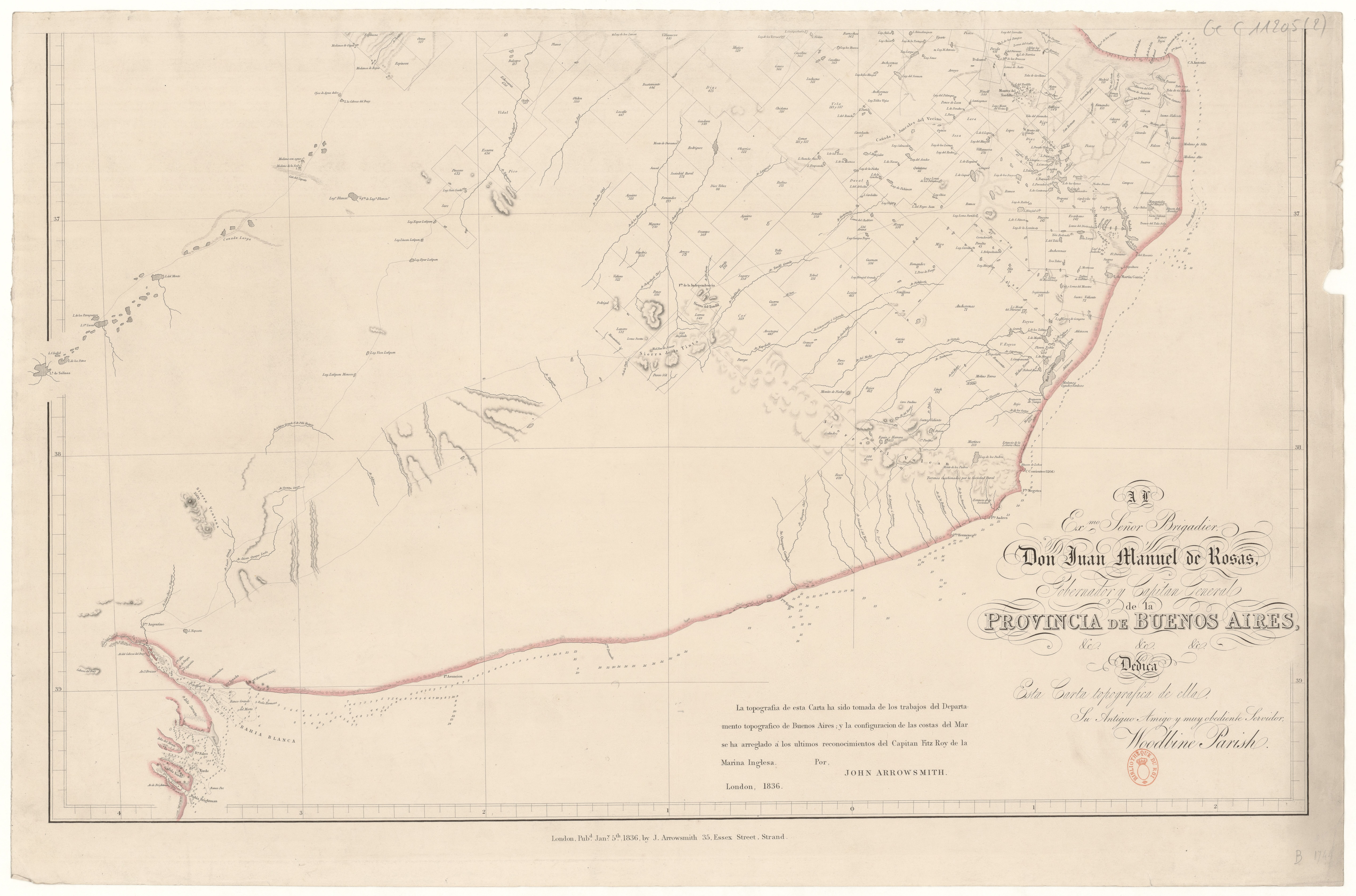
Southern Buenos Aires Province as depicted on an 1836 map by Woodbine Parish and John Arrowsmith.

From the 1830s onward, occupation and land access proceeded through mechanisms such as emphyteusis (1830–1849), the leasing of public lands (1860–1877), and later the sale of land to private owners (from 1878 onward), laying the groundwork for large estancias whose coastal margins would later be subdivided. These policies, while formally aimed at encouraging settlement, in practice favored the consolidation of extensive pastoral estates and reinforced cattle ranching as the dominant economic structure of the southern frontier. In coastal districts such as those later organized as Necochea and Benito Juárez, public lands began to be distributed through emphyteusis as early as 1827, yet population growth remained limited for several decades due to distance from Buenos Aires, harsh living conditions and the continuing risk of indigenous raids. Early institutional footholds included the creation of the curacy of Nuestra Señora de Dolores in 1817, the establishment of the Nahuel Rucá fort in 1822, and the formation around 1825 of the partido of Monsalvo, later redistributed in 1839 into El Tuyú (later General Madariaga), Mar Chiquita, Rincón de Ajó to Estancia Los Manantiales (later General Lavalle), and Vecino (today General Guido). These administrative and ecclesiastical measures formed part of a broader strategy of transforming zones of frontier interaction into stable jurisdictions under provincial authority, supported by local militias and networks of political intermediaries. After the fall of Juan Manuel de Rosas, confiscations and reallocations of estancias south of the Salado altered land tenure and brought new coastal properties into the hands of actors linked to the new political order, including landowners whose fields reached the Atlantic shoreline. Renewed military campaigns and the reorganization of frontier defenses in the 1850s further extended provincial control, creating the territorial conditions that later enabled port projects, industrial ventures and coastal urban foundations in the second half of the 19th century, while the definitive incorporation of vast southern territories into the national space would only be achieved after the Conquest of the Desert campaigns of the late 1870s.

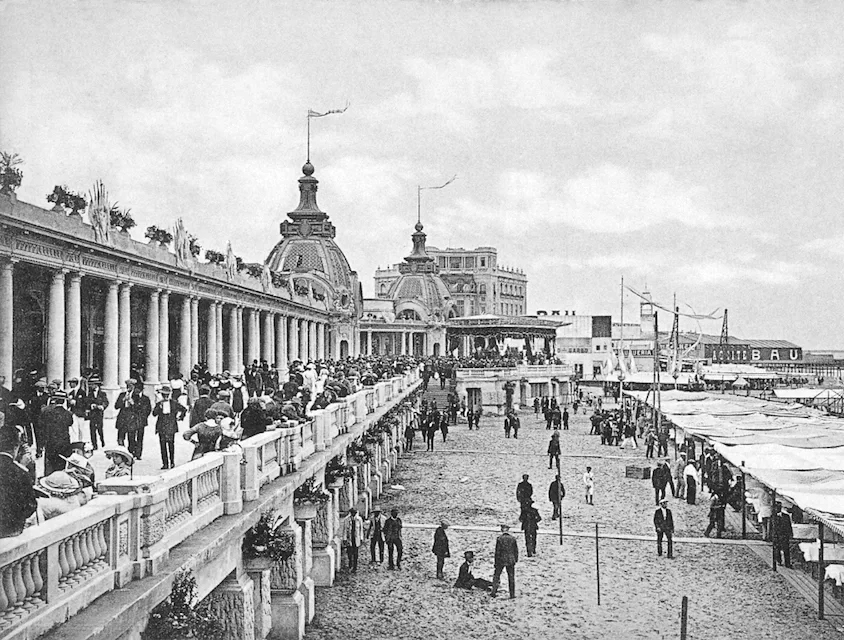
View of the old Rambla and Playa Bristol in Mar del Plata, 1913.

By the mid-19th century, the Buenos Aires maritime coast remained sparsely populated and functioned largely as the seaward edge of large estancias with limited productive value, while its landscape combined low sedimentary beaches, dune cordons and sectors with cliffs and rocky points. A decisive shift in coastal valorisation began with industrial and port initiatives: in 1856, José Coelho de Meyrelles purchased estancias to establish a port and a saladero south of the Salado River, concentrating export-oriented activity and fostering a small settlement near the mouth of the Las Chacras stream, where Mar del Plata later developed. Although this enterprise failed to meet expectations, the sale of the saladero to Patricio Peralta Ramos in 1860 and the official authorization of the town layout in 1874 initiated a sustained process of land valorisation of the urban area and surrounding rural properties. After acquiring industrial installations and land in 1877, Pedro Luro modernized the saladero and diversified production while also promoting lodging and gastronomy, seeking to transform the coastal nucleus into a service-oriented resort town. Connectivity proved crucial for the wider region, as the arrival of the railway in 1886 and the beginning of major port works in 1911 helped consolidate the principal coastal hub and strengthened the logistical basis for seaside travel. This first tourism phase followed an elite resort model inspired by European stations, shaped by upper-class sociability from Buenos Aires and enabled by transport systems that reduced distance and seasonal barriers.

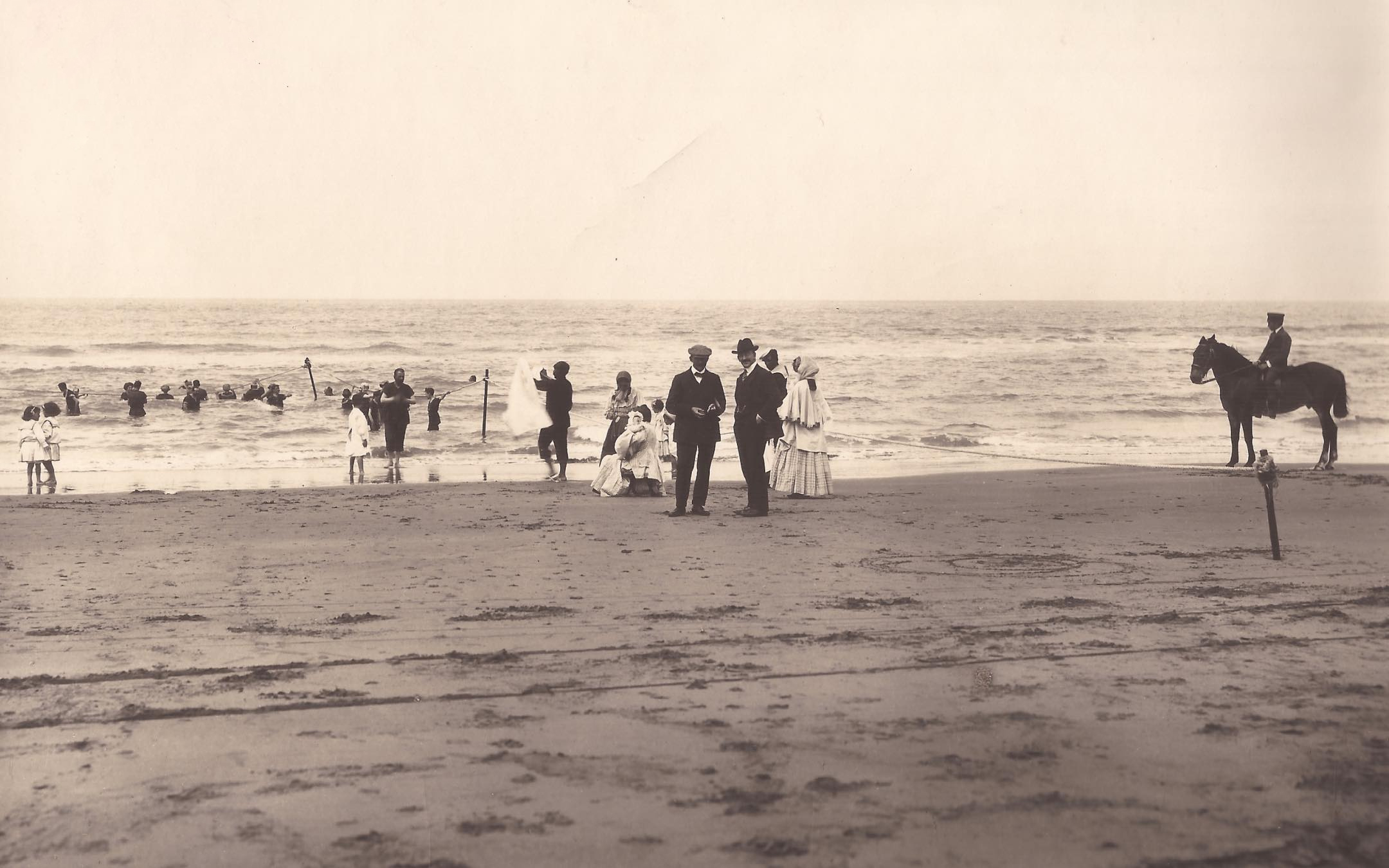
Sea bathing in Necochea, 1907.

Rather than remaining confined to a single urban nucleus, tourism-driven development gradually extended along the shoreline, as the success of Mar del Plata and the rising value of the maritime margins of large estancias encouraged land subdivision and resort projects from the late 19th century onward, including Necochea (1881), Miramar (1888), Mar del Sud (1889) and Boulevard Atlántico (initiated in 1889 and later abandoned), even as Mar del Plata retained regional primacy. In the early 20th century, provincial regulation also shaped where new settlements could be approved, since the 1913 Law on the Founding of Towns (Law 3487/13) required conditions such as potable water, non-floodable terrain and land cessions for public use, despite not being designed for recreation-based towns or for the dune coast's topography. As coastal bathing practices consolidated, the Atlantic shore increasingly displaced earlier riverine recreational sites near Buenos Aires such as Tigre, Quilmes and Punta Lara, while the beach became integrated into the economy and culture of seaside urban life. Over time, the coast became more closely linked to metropolitan mobility patterns, and seaside leisure increasingly depended on accessibility and transport infrastructure connecting the coast with Buenos Aires. This reorientation created the conditions for a wider corridor of resorts that would later form the core of what is commonly understood as the Atlantic Coast (Costa Atlántica). In this process, Mar del Plata functioned as the main regional hub, but the broader territorial dynamic was the progressive multiplication and interconnection of coastal localities along the shoreline.

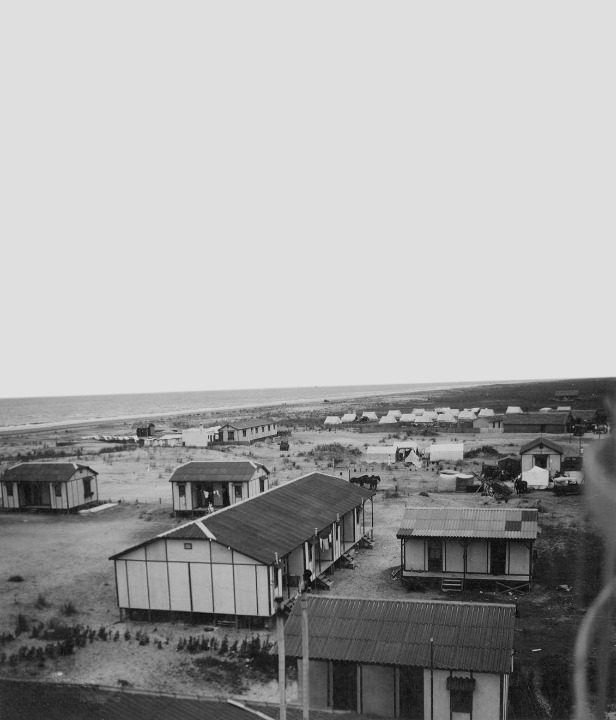
View of San Clemente del Tuyú in 1938.

A major acceleration occurred from the 1930s onward, when new beach towns multiplied and the coastal strip was subdivided into resort settlements. In the northern and central coastal sector, urbanizations emerged as the maritime edges of partidos such as General Lavalle, General Madariaga and Mar Chiquita were revalorized for tourism and subdivided, typically on dune-barrier landscapes where afforestation preceded tourist urbanization. Within what later became Partido de La Costa, resort foundations included Mar de Ajó (1934), San Clemente del Tuyú (1935), San Bernardo (1943), Las Toninas (1943), Mar del Tuyú (1945), Santa Teresita (1946), La Lucila del Mar (1954), and later Costa del Este and Aguas Verdes (both 1966), forming a linear chain of settlements organized along the shore. In the area that later became Partido de Pinamar, the resort system included Ostende (with early constructions dating to 1908), Pinamar (1941), Valeria del Mar (1945) and Cariló (1960), developed through dune afforestation and planning ideals associated with garden-city models and wooded landscapes. In the area that later formed Partido de Villa Gesell, the coastal system included Villa Gesell (founded in 1931) and later Mar Azul (1946), Las Gaviotas (1948) and Mar de las Pampas (1957), alongside the Faro Querandí zone, whose lighthouse was inaugurated in 1922 and later became associated with conservation initiatives. From the 1970s onward, intensified development contributed to territorial fragmentation and to the creation of new administrative units grouping multiple resort settlements with similar origins but differing in population size and urban scale.

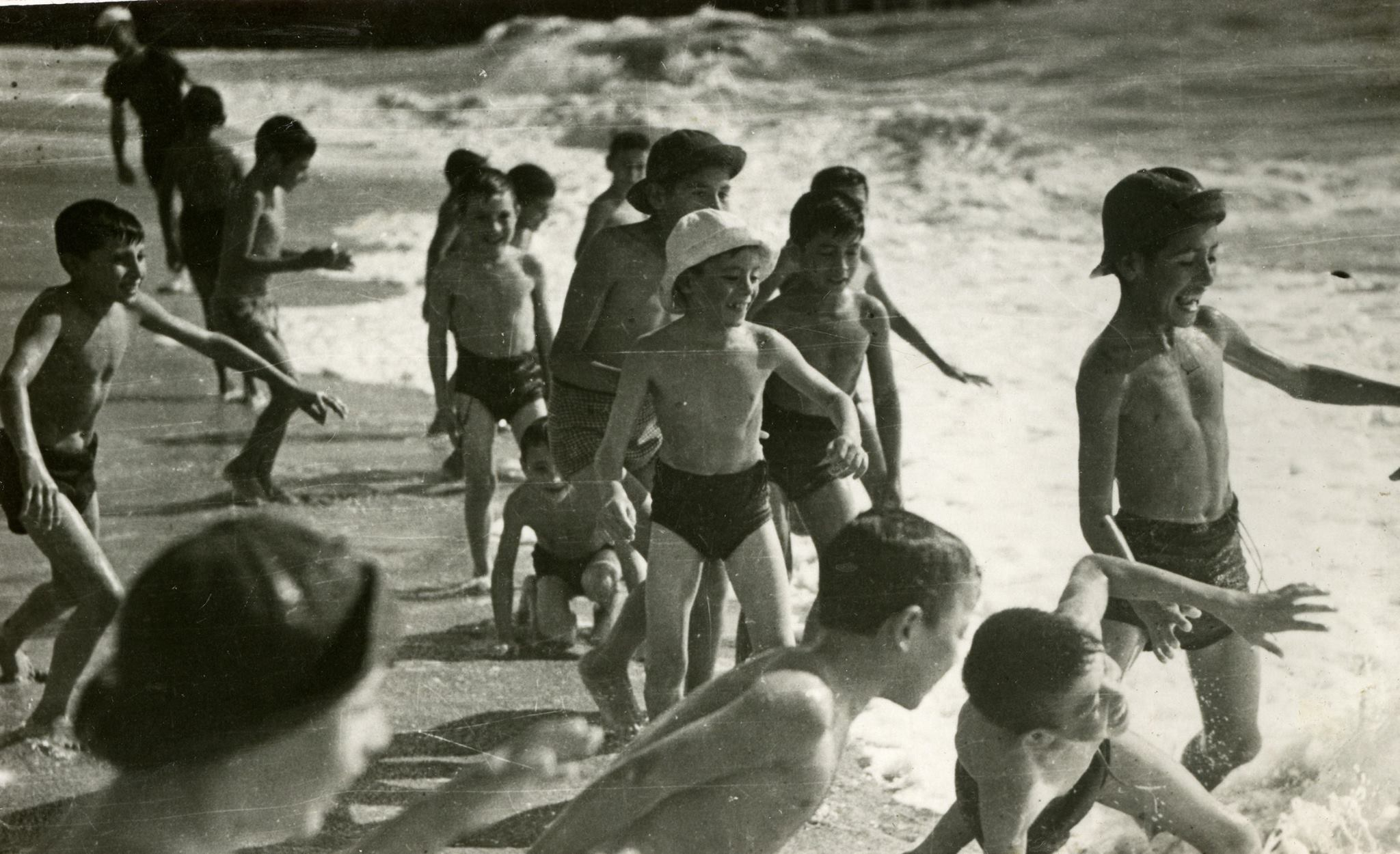
Schoolchildren at summer camp in Chapadmalal, 1950.

As this corridor expanded, it also diversified socially and functionally, and its later growth cannot be explained without mass tourism and changing mobility patterns. A second structuring moment for coastal tourism unfolded in the mid-20th century alongside industrialization and the expansion of the middle class, which increased demand for seaside vacations and encouraged the proliferation of smaller resorts beyond the original elite model. Road-based mobility became increasingly significant as automobile diffusion and public investment in highways improved accessibility, including the paving of Provincial Route 2 in 1938 and the development of secondary routes linking coastal resorts to inland circuits and to Buenos Aires. During Peronism, organized vacationing and trade union hotel systems contributed to the democratization of holidays, reinforcing the coast as a leisure space for broad social sectors rather than only elites. This transformation was not limited to existing cities but also materialized in new state-built facilities along the coast, most notably the Chapadmalal vacation colony south of Mar del Plata, developed through state expropriations in the mid-1940s and later operated by the Eva Perón Foundation as a major center of social tourism for workers and students. At the same time, Mar del Plata experienced rapid demographic and economic growth and reinforced its role as the coast's principal hub, while fishing, related industries, and a naval presence complemented tourism and made the city increasingly multifunctional. At the same time, many newer resort towns retained marked seasonality, and outside the summer peak they tended to maintain small permanent populations and limited year-round economic diversification. As tourism expanded among middle-class sectors and Mar del Plata became more congested, much of the resort system adopted a predominantly middle-class profile, with Cariló often identified as an exception that preserved a more exclusive character.

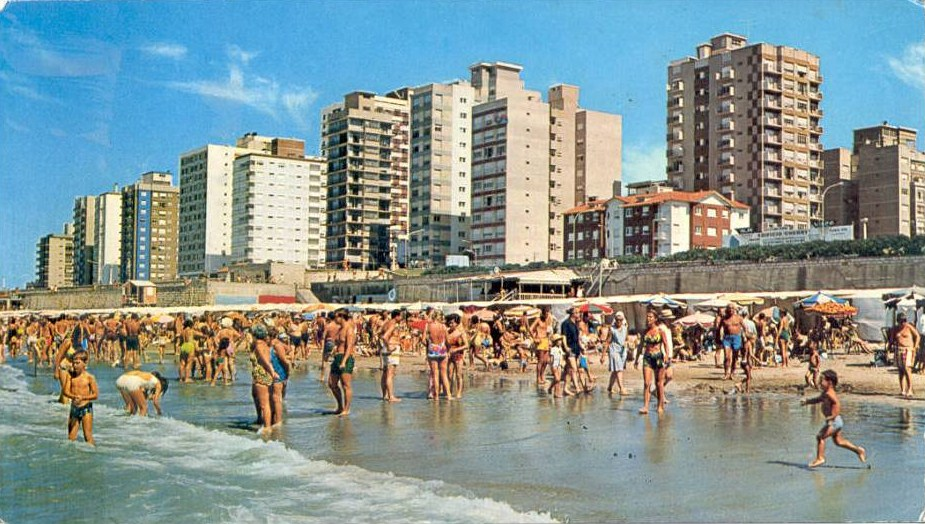
View of the beach in Miramar, c. 1970s.

By the late 20th century, coastal urbanization had produced an extensive and often near-continuous resort system, though with clear internal contrasts along the shoreline. Spatially, this pattern extended almost uninterrupted from south of Samborombón Bay toward Mar del Plata and Miramar, with few gaps between built-up resort areas in the northern and central corridor. Within Partido de Mar Chiquita, the coastal set of localities included Santa Clara del Mar (founded in 1949) alongside Mar Chiquita and Mar de Cobo, and the partido combined littoral settlements with interior rural centers, illustrating that not all coastal districts fragmented in the same way as the northern corridor. South of the main corridor, other coastal resorts remained smaller and more locally oriented, including Claromecó, Reta and Oriente, while Monte Hermoso functioned as a tourist center strongly linked to Bahía Blanca and Necochea–Quequén stood out as an intermediate city combining port functions with beach tourism. Across the coastal system, the shift from an earlier agrarian territorial model to a tourism-oriented coastal model was reinforced by the subdivision of low-productivity maritime margins of estancias, the rise of second homes, and the consolidation of beach tourism as the dominant organizing logic of settlement. In this way, the Atlantic Coast developed historically as a leisure-oriented territorial system structured around tourism and real-estate development, differentiated from inland municipalities whose economies remained primarily anchored in agriculture and livestock production. The result was a coastal network in which Mar del Plata remained the principal epicenter, but whose defining feature is the broader mosaic of resort towns and partidos that progressively reorganized land use, mobility, and settlement along the Atlantic shore.

=== Administrative divisions ===
Location of some of the resort towns of the Atlantic Coast (in blue), with Mar del Plata, the region's epicenter, highlighted in black; within Buenos Aires Province, and with the Buenos Aires Metropolitan Area shown in yellow.
- Partido de La Costa
- Partido de Pinamar
- Partido de Villa Gesell
- Partido de Mar Chiquita
- Partido de General Pueyrredón
- Partido de General Alvarado
- Partido de Lobería
- Partido de Necochea
- Partido de San Cayetano
- Partido de Tres Arroyos
- Partido de Coronel Dorrego
- Partido de Monte Hermoso
- Partido de Coronel Rosales
- Partido de Bahía Blanca

=== Geography and climate ===
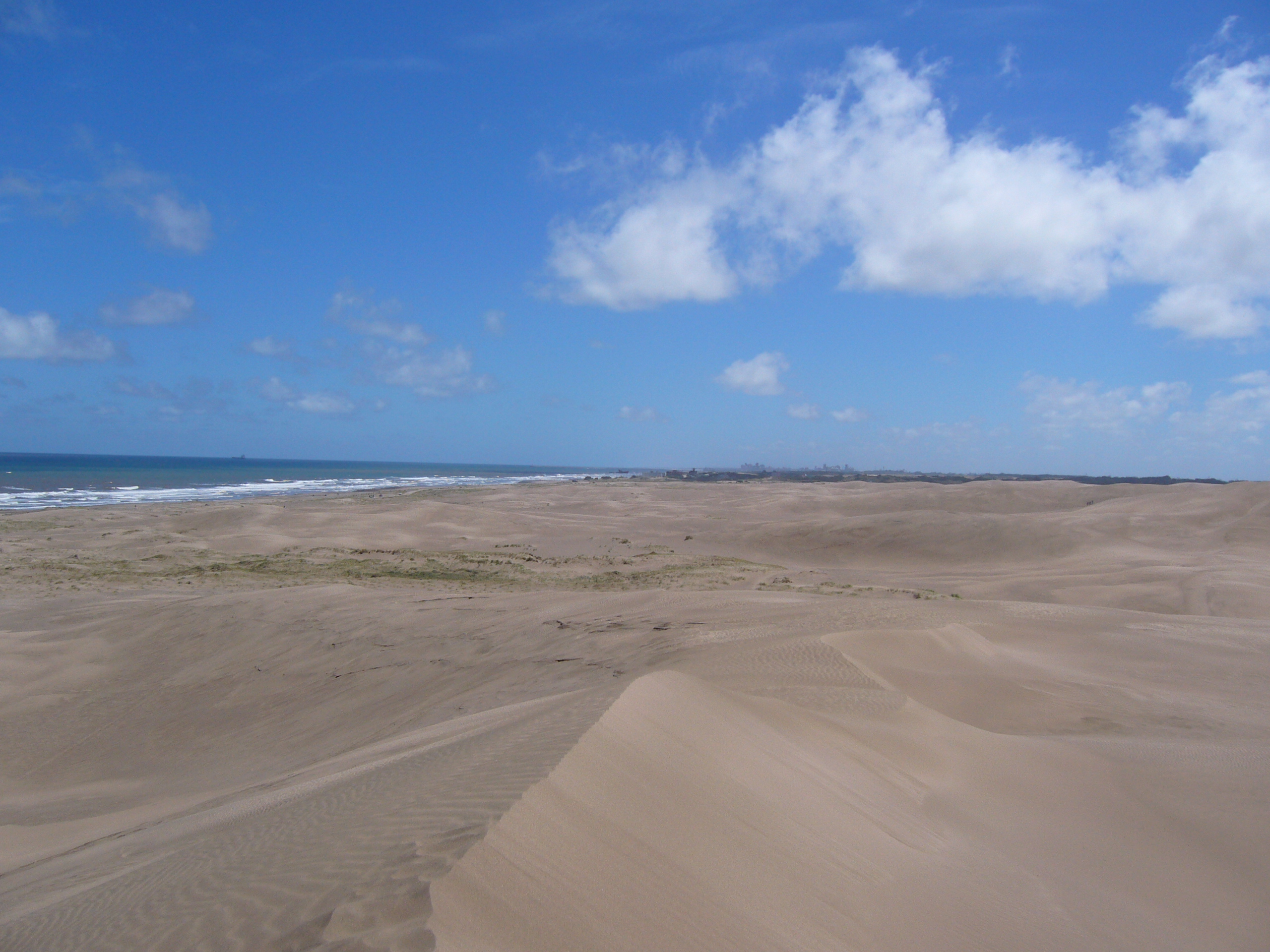
Extensive coastal dune fields occupy much of the Atlantic Coast, as seen in this view from Arenas Verdes, Partido de La Costa.

The Atlantic coast of Buenos Aires Province is largely a straight shoreline bordering the Pampas region, much of which is characterized by an alternation of extensive dune complexes and low sandy beaches. (Fuente Bouvet). It extends for approximately 1,281 km, from Punta Rasa at Cape San Antonio to the northern margin of the mouth of the Río Negro river, and constitutes a distinctive coastal system bathed by the waters of the Argentine Sea. The influence of the Atlantic Ocean moderates local climatic conditions along the entire coast. The climate corresponds to a temperate oceanic type, with a mean annual temperature of about 14 °C, average summer temperatures around 20 °C, and average winter values close to 8 °C. Precipitation reaches its maximum values during the summer. Although rainfall intensity is higher in the warm season, much of the water either runs off superficially or evaporates rapidly due to high temperatures. The period of strongest winds generally extends from September to January. During summer, prevailing winds blow from the east and northeast under the influence of the Atlantic anticyclone and continental low pressure. In contrast, during winter a continental high-pressure system predominates, and winds mainly originate from the west and southwest. The combination of climatic conditions, coastal morphology and the availability of tourist services has contributed to the development of the Buenos Aires Atlantic Coast as Argentina's most important vacation destination.

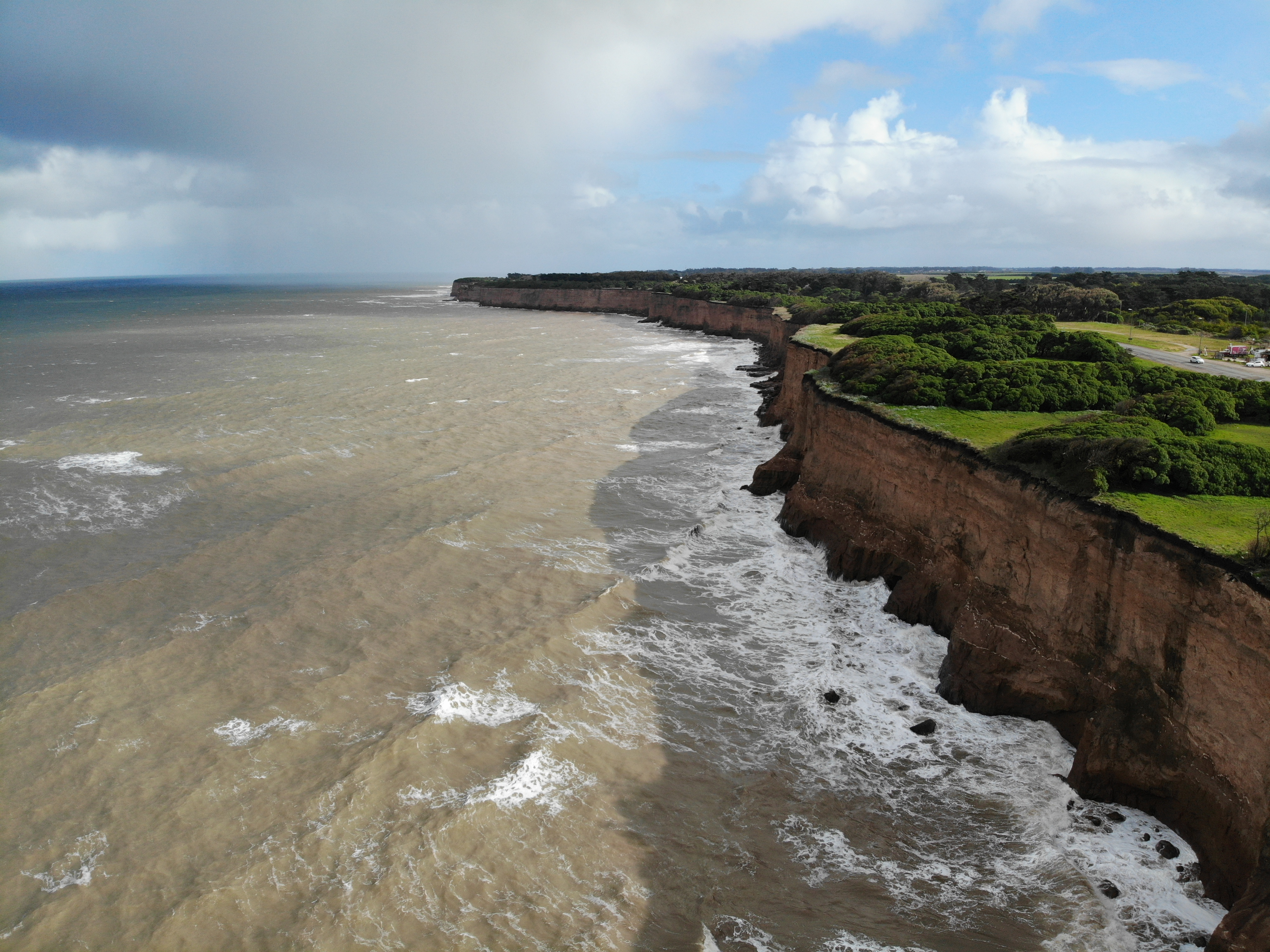
In the Mar del Plata area, the monotony of the Pampas plain is interrupted by the Tandilia mountains, which create undulations and cliffs.

The coastal geomorphology is characterized by a narrow belt of sandy sediments shaped into dune relief, extending from San Clemente del Tuyú to Bahía Blanca and interrupted only in the area of Mar del Plata. In that sector, the eastern extensions of the Tandilia mountains, reaching elevations of around 500 m, generate intra-urban undulations and form coastal cliffs interspersed with wide beaches. This slight topographic alteration, which appears again farther south in connection with the foothills of the Sierra de la Ventana, stands out against the general flatness of the provincial coastal plain. A similar formation also appears in the south of the province, particularly in Bahía San Blas. Most of this unit consists of sandy materials produced and transported by marine action, which are continuously reworked by wind and hinder the development of vegetation and soils. Only where plant cover has stabilized the landscape have very incipient soils developed, in which only a superficial horizon with low organic matter content can be recognized.

From San Clemente del Tuyú to the Mar Chiquita lagoon, and from Miramar to Pehuen-Có (Coronel Rosales), the dominant landscape consists of coastal dune fields arranged in ridge-like belts, some with active crests and others fixed by vegetation. In contrast, in the locality of Punta Alta the landscape is characterized by isolated dune formations and by extensive flat and gently undulating areas. A similar configuration occurs in Bahía San Blas (Patagones), where dune fields are associated with gently rolling hills. The coastal strip of the partidos of Coronel Rosales, Bahía Blanca, Villarino and Patagones is characterized by landscapes composed of extensive marine plains and tidal channels, in some sectors transformed into salt flats. In the specific case of Los Pocitos (Villarino), marine coastal plains alternate with micro-relief consisting of small hills and shallow depressions.

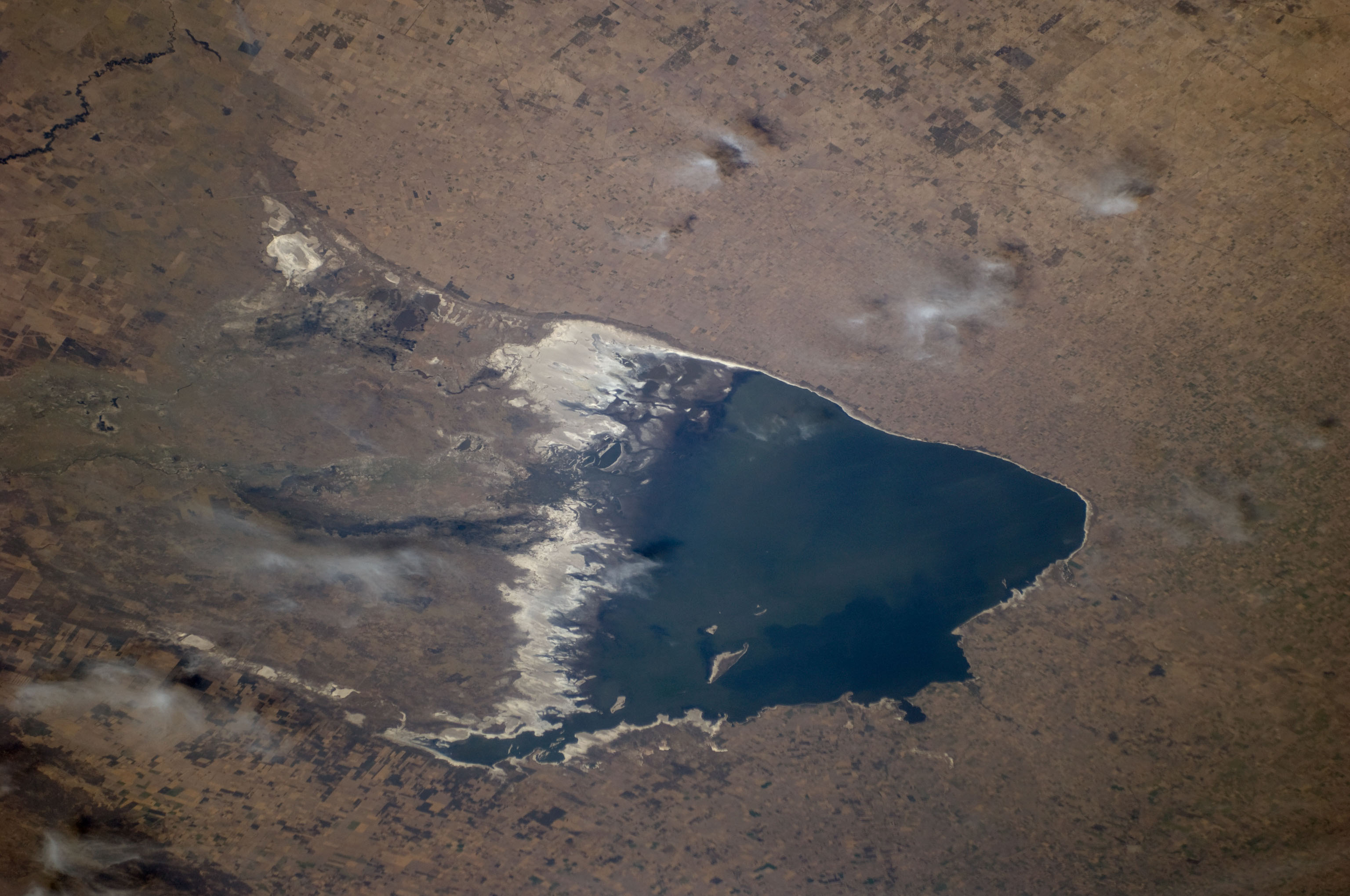
Satellite picture of the Mar Chiquita lagoon, in the partido of the same name.

A geomorphological study identified the sector extending from the northern end of Cape San Antonio to Punta Negra (Necochea) as the most complex portion of the Buenos Aires Atlantic coast. This segment covers approximately 180 km, about one-seventh of the total coastal length, and is subdivided into five sections distinguished by specific morphological traits. In the northernmost section, extending from Cape San Antonio to just south of Mar Chiquita lagoon, abundant sand supplied by littoral currents and redistributed by marine winds forms continuous dune belts that block continental drainage and promote the formation of lagoons behind the dunes. These water bodies hinder drainage toward the ocean, which has led to the construction of artificial channels to facilitate runoff. Behind the dune belt lies Mar Chiquita lagoon, an albufera that receives freshwater from the Tandilia drainage basin and also maintains a marine inlet from the Atlantic Ocean, discharging to the sea through a variable-width southern channel.

The second section, extending south of Mar Chiquita lagoon to the La Perla area of Mar del Plata, is characterized by coastal cliffs between 3 and 15 m high, narrow beaches, and strong wave action that directly erodes the cliff base during high tide. In this stretch, dunes are generally small and low because narrow beaches and littoral currents limit sand accumulation. The area has also experienced significant human modification through the replacement of native vegetation with introduced forests of conifers and broad-leaved species. The third section, from Punta Iglesia to Punta Mogotes, includes a sequence of embayments and rocky headlands that control sediment deposition and beach development. In this sector, some beaches show significant recent sediment accumulation, particularly in the Punta Mogotes area, where wind-driven sands advance inland over formerly rocky substrates.

The fourth section, between Punta Mogotes and Punta Hermengo, extends for about 35 km and is marked by strongly undulating relief produced by fluvial valleys intersecting the coastal plain. In some headland areas, vertical cliffs reach heights of up to 30 m, while in valley mouths the coastline retreats inland, forming small embayments with beaches such as Alfar, Chapadmalal and Miramar. Wind action also contributes to the accumulation of modern dunes atop the cliffs, particularly near Punta Mogotes, requiring stabilization through vegetation. The fifth section, from Punta Hermengo to Punta Negra west of Necochea, consists of a low-relief coastal plain receiving numerous inland watercourses, including the Quequén Grande River, whose wide estuary is influenced by tidal action and associated with muddy tidal flats. In this area, dune belts locally increase cliff height to as much as 40 m and restrict access from inland areas.

== Atlantic Coast of Patagonia ==
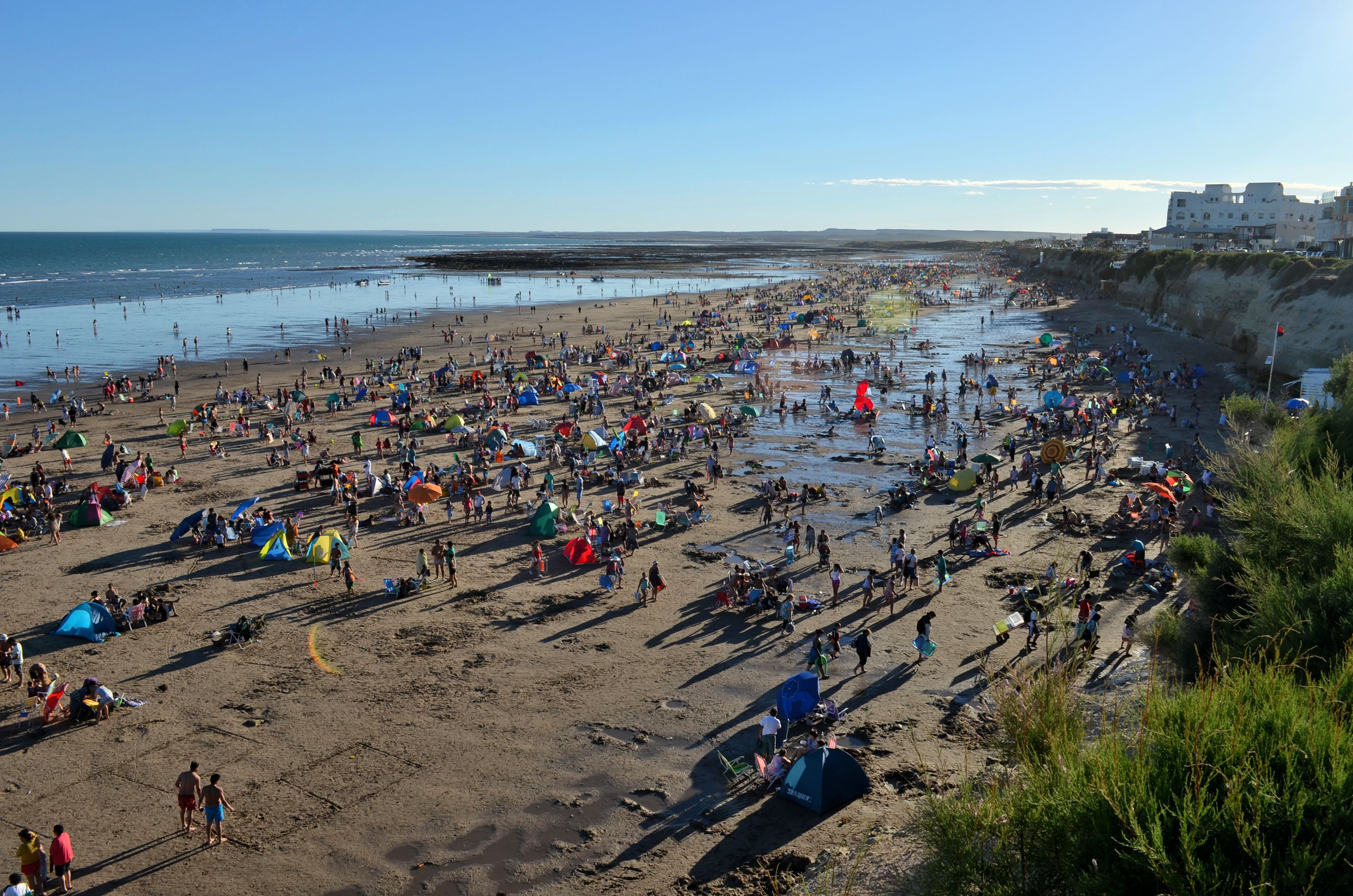
Beachgoers in Las Grutas, Río Negro Province.

The Patagonian Atlantic Coast is characterized by scenic coastal landscapes in which marine wildlife is the dominant feature, with high species richness and some of the largest animal colonies on the planet. Parallel to much of the Atlantic shoreline runs National Route 3, which functions as the main north–south travel axis for coastal itineraries through Patagonia. Traveling south along Route 3, the first Patagonian city encountered is Viedma, capital of Río Negro Province. About 30 km from the city lies the seaside resort of El Cóndor, where low beaches transition westward into the first coastal cliffs that host the world's largest colony of burrowing parrots (Cyanoliseus patagonus). Along long sandy stretches, additional beach resorts and areas for wind and water sports are distributed, but they are spatially limited compared with the overall extent of the coastline. Farther south are the towns of San Antonio Oeste and Las Grutas, the latter located within the Bahía de San Antonio Protected Natural Area on the coast of the San Matías Gulf. The gulf supports high marine biodiversity that can be observed year-round through boat excursions departing from Las Grutas and San Antonio Este. Depending on the season, sightings include dolphins, sea lions, petrels, albatrosses, penguins and, from August to October, southern right whales (Eubalaena australis). Due to its geographic position, the beaches of Las Grutas are noted for relatively warmer waters, which attract large numbers of summer tourists. Continuing south through Río Negro Province, Playas Doradas offers opportunities for nature-based recreation and nautical sports along a three-kilometer beach with very fine sands derived from quartz and silica fragmentation. From this area, the Islote Lobos National Park can be accessed via the Desembocadura self-guided trail, with visitation conditioned by tidal cycles.

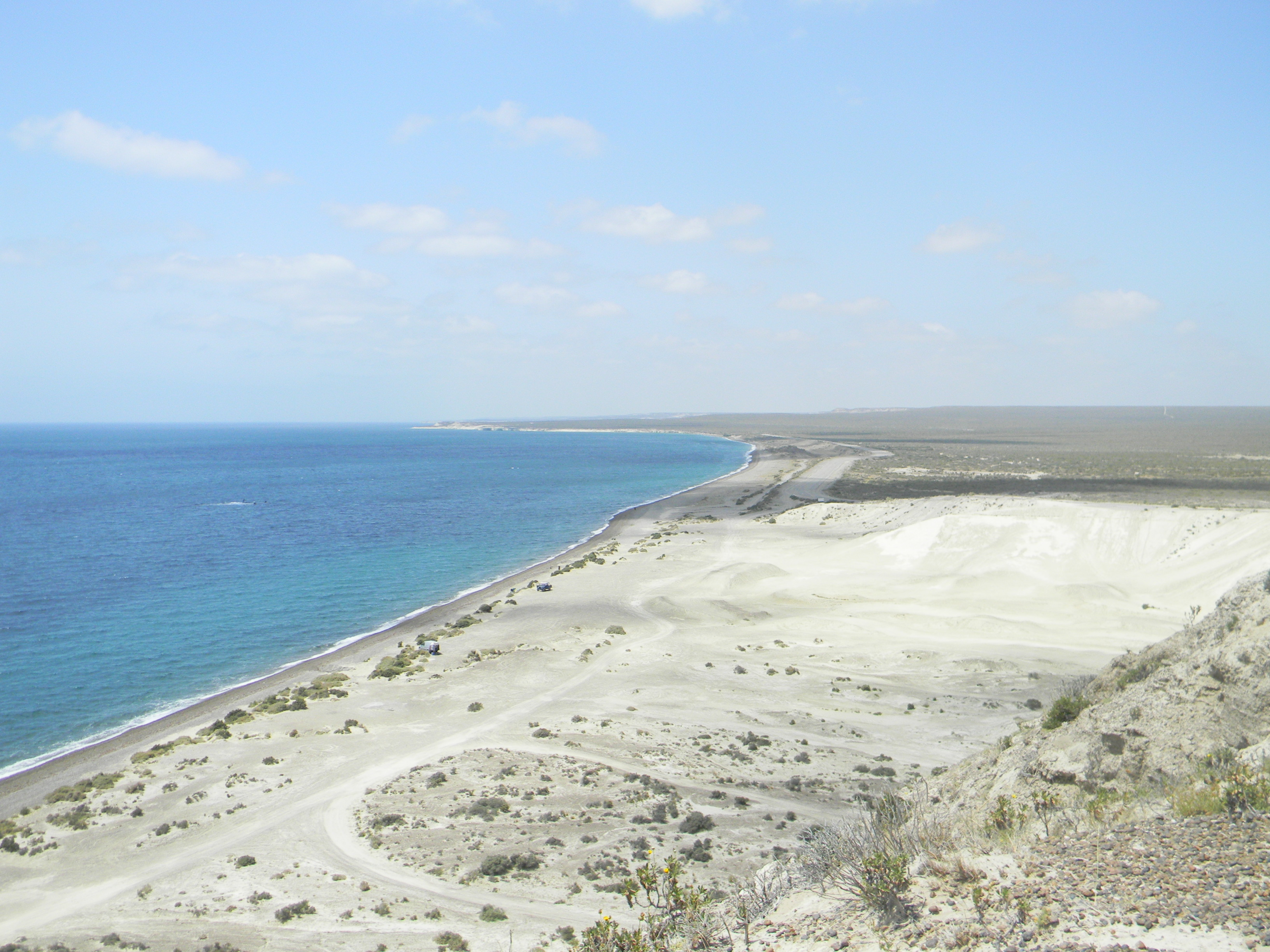
A beach near Puerto Madryn, in the Valdés Peninsula, Chubut Province.

In Chubut Province, Puerto Madryn functions as the main service center of the Patagonian coast and as the gateway to the Valdés Peninsula, declared a UNESCO World Heritage Site in 1999. The peninsula is a breeding and calving ground for southern right whales, which can be observed between June and mid-December, particularly from the town of Puerto Pirámides. Near Puerto Madryn, the El Doradillo Protected Natural Area is recognized as one of the best locations for land-based whale watching. The region also hosts dolphins, orcas, sea lions, elephant seals, Magellanic penguins and numerous seabirds and terrestrial species. Punta Tombo Protected Natural Area contains one of the largest continental colonies of Magellanic penguins, exceeding 400,000 individuals, visible between September and April. Between Trelew and Comodoro Rivadavia, the so-called "Blue Route" extends for more than 450 km along the Chubut coast, linking scenic landscapes, small towns and protected areas near the Argentine Sea. This corridor includes bays and islands that serve as refuges for birds and marine mammals and highlights the Parque Provincial Patagonia Azul, one of the largest coastal-marine reserves in Argentina and designated a UNESCO Biosphere Reserve. The Cabo Dos Bahías Protected Natural Area, considered the gateway to the Patagonia Austral Interjurisdictional Coastal-Marine Park, preserves volcanic coastal landscapes and an important Magellanic penguin colony. Near Comodoro Rivadavia, the Sierras Coloradas Protected Natural Area combines coastal fauna with fossil forests containing conifer trunks over 60 million years old and Paleocene palm remains.

Farther south in Santa Cruz Province, the coastal segment of the Blue Route follows National Route 3 from Caleta Olivia to Río Gallegos, connecting historic ports, rural settlements and protected natural areas where the Atlantic meets the Patagonian Plateau. Along this stretch, visitors can access observation points for sea lions, elephant seals, Commerson's dolphins, cormorants, Antarctic pigeons, Magellanic penguins, and the only continental colony of southern rockhopper penguins. Major natural attractions include Isla Pingüino, the Deseado Estuary, Darwin viewpoints, Monte León National Park and Cabo Vírgenes. Cultural attractions include museums and historic monuments, notably in San Julián, where European contact with local populations occurred in 1520 during Ferdinand Magellan's expedition, commemorated by a full-scale replica of the Nao Victoria.

== See also ==
- Geography of Argentina
- Regions of Argentina
- Tourism in Argentina

== Bibliography ==
- Athor, José; Celsi, Cintia, eds. (2016). La Costa Atlántica de Buenos Aires (PDF) (in Spanish). Buenos Aires: Fundación de Historia Natural Félix de Azara. ISBN 978-987-3781-30-8.
- Barreneche, Osvaldo, ed. (2014). Historia de la provincia de Buenos Aires: tomo 5. Del primer peronismo a la crisis de 2001 (PDF) (in Spanish). Buenos Aires: UNIPE: Editorial Universitaria; Edhasa. ISBN 978-987-628-304-5. Archived from the original (PDF) on 11 September 2025 – via CLACSO.
