= San Antonio Oeste =

City in Río Negro Province, Argentina

- City
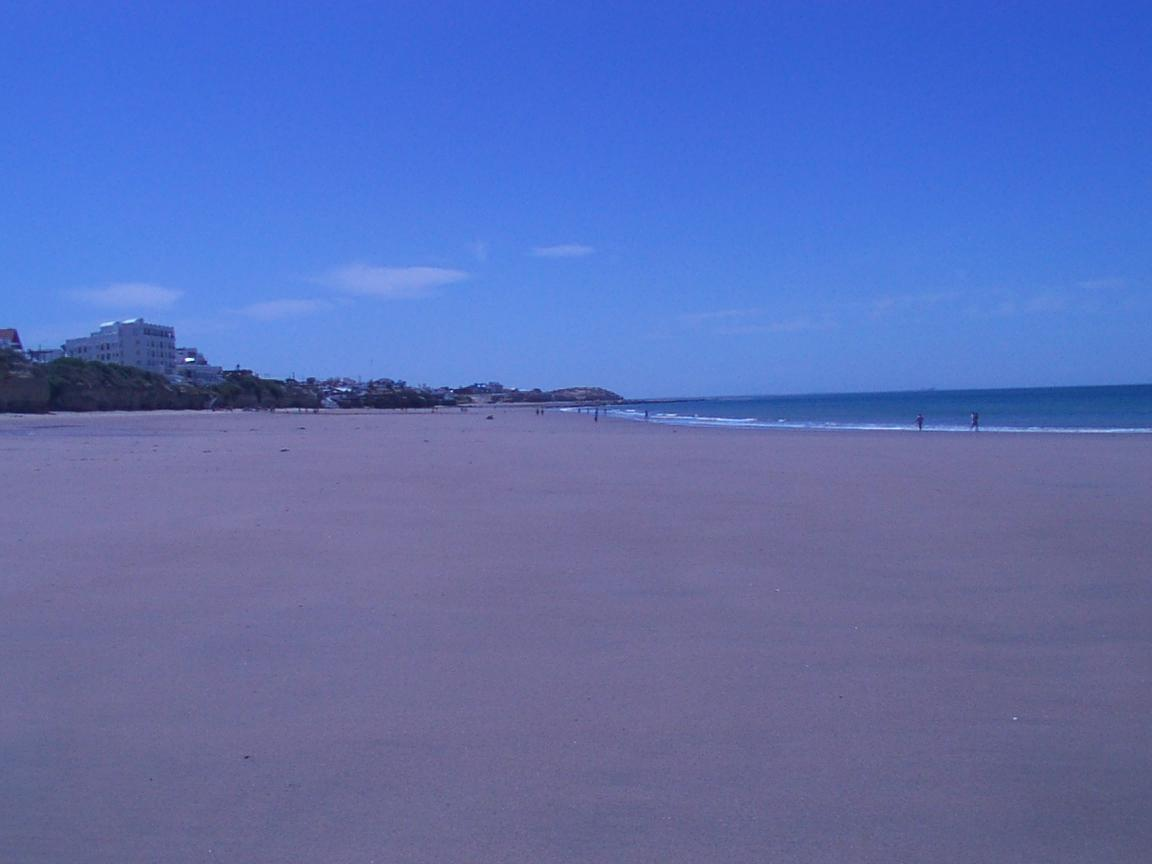
- San Antonio Oeste

- Location within Argentina
- Coordinates: 40°44′S 64°57′W
- Country: Argentina
- Province: Río Negro
- Established: July 10, 1905

Government
  - Intendant: Jorge Adrián Casadei
- Elevation: 3 m (9.8 ft)

Population (2010 census)
  - Total: 16,265
- Time zone: UTC−3 (ART)
- CPA Base: R8520
- Climate: BSk
- Website: https://sanantoniooeste.gob.ar/

San Antonio Oeste is a port city in the Argentine province of Río Negro, and head of the department of San Antonio.

The town is bordered by its sister communities of San Antonio Este, to the east, and Las Grutas, to the southwest. Discovered by an expedition of the Spanish Empire in 1779, San Matías Gulf became the site of an outpost, San Antonio (so named in honor of St. Anthony of Padua). Water scarcity led the original settlement to fail in 1905, leading the community to settle west of the gulf, in what today is San Antonio Oeste.

The arrival of the Buenos Aires Great Southern Railway in its expansion towards Bariloche in 1910 led to the hamlet's growth. It later became the site of Punta Verde, the leading port for the large wool export industry of Patagonia, though the collapse in the wool market during the 1930s and 1940s led to the port's closure in 1944.

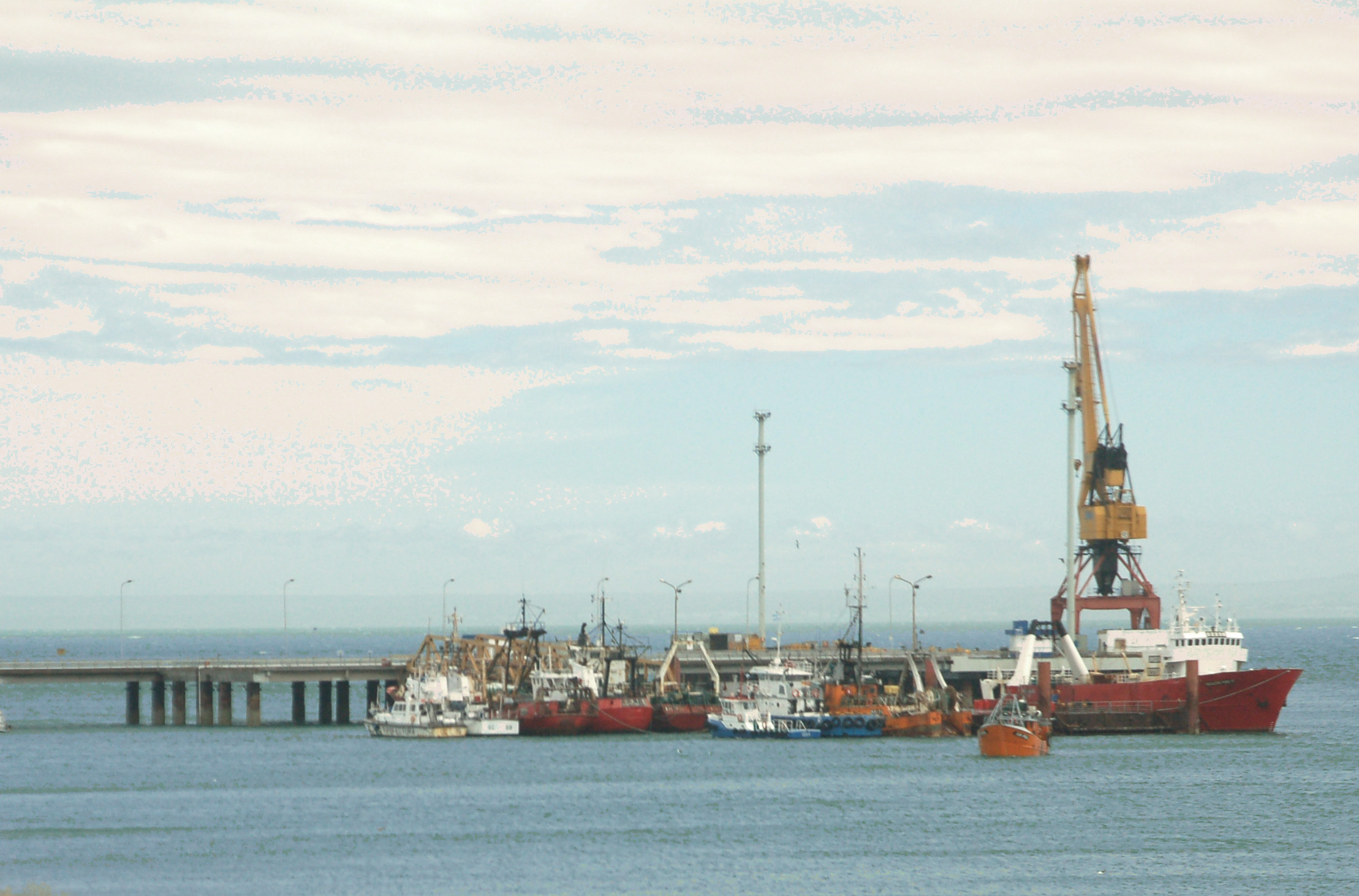
Deep-water port of San Antonio Este

San Antonio Oeste benefited afterwards from a growth in tourism in nearby Las Grutas, a scenic cove known for its grottoes. Since 2000, it has also been home to a growing fishing industry, resulting from the opening of a deep-water port in San Antonio Este.

== Geography ==
=== Climate ===
San Antonio Oeste has a semi-arid climate (Köppen climate classification BSk) with cool winters and hot summers. Winters are characterized with cool temperatures during the day and very cold nights. In the coldest month, June and July, the mean temperature is 8.3 °C (46.9 °F). Temperatures can regularly fall below freezing during the winter months although snowfalls rarely occur, averaging 0.2 days with snow per year. During this time of the year, the weather is characterized by cloudy weather in which an average of 9–11 overcast days are recorded per month.

Spring and fall are transition seasons featuring mild daytime temperatures and cool nighttime temperatures. Spring starts out cool, with frosts that occur regularly in September with the last date of frost occurring on October 2. However, frosts can occur as late as November 4 It is also a windy season, which can make the temperature feel cooler than it should be. Autumn starts out warm but increasingly becomes cooler in April and May with the frosts that can occur as early as March 26. Normally, the first date of frost occurs on April 28.

Summers are hot during the day while nighttime temperatures are mild. It tends to be sunnier than the other seasons with only 4–6 overcast days per month and having 7–11 clear days per month. In the hottest month, January, the average high is 30.2 °C (86.4 °F) while the average low is 16.6 °C (61.9 °F). During the most extreme heat waves, the temperature can reach above 40 °C (104.0 °F) from November to March. The average relative humidity is 57%, with the winter months being more humid than the winter months. San Antonio Oeste is windy throughout the year with mean wind speeds ranging from a low of 13.8 km/h (8.6 mph) in April to a high of 23.1 km/h (14.4 mph) in December. Precipitation is low throughout the year with San Antonio Oeste receiving 248.0 millimetres (10 in) of precipitation per year with 63 days with measureable precipitation that is fairly evenly distributed throughout the year. There are approximately 2,633.5 hours of bright sunshine per year or 58.3% of possible sunshine per year, ranging from a low of 45.7% in June (only 136.4 hours of sunshine per month) to a high of 72.0% in February. The highest recorded temperature was 44.6 °C (112.3 °F) while the lowest recorded temperature was −11.5 °C (11.3 °F) on June 22, 2002.

Climate data for San Antonio Oeste (1991–2020, extremes 1941–present) (Note: The record highs and lows are based on the Secretaria de Mineria link for the period 1941–1990 while records beyond 1990 come from the Servicio Meteorológico Nacional link since it only covers from 1961–present. As a result, the most extreme values from either source are used.)
Month	Jan	Feb	Mar	Apr	May	Jun	Jul	Aug	Sep	Oct	Nov	Dec	Year
Record high °C (°F)	44.6 (112.3)	43.6 (110.5)	40.0 (104.0)	35.0 (95.0)	32.1 (89.8)	26.6 (79.9)	27.2 (81.0)	28.4 (83.1)	33.3 (91.9)	38.6 (101.5)	41.0 (105.8)	44.1 (111.4)	44.6 (112.3)
Mean daily maximum °C (°F)	30.4 (86.7)	29.2 (84.6)	26.4 (79.5)	21.5 (70.7)	16.9 (62.4)	13.8 (56.8)	13.4 (56.1)	15.8 (60.4)	18.1 (64.6)	22.0 (71.6)	25.9 (78.6)	28.9 (84.0)	21.9 (71.4)
Daily mean °C (°F)	22.8 (73.0)	21.8 (71.2)	19.2 (66.6)	14.3 (57.7)	10.2 (50.4)	7.5 (45.5)	6.6 (43.9)	8.7 (47.7)	11.3 (52.3)	15.2 (59.4)	18.7 (65.7)	21.5 (70.7)	14.8 (58.6)
Mean daily minimum °C (°F)	15.7 (60.3)	14.6 (58.3)	12.3 (54.1)	7.8 (46.0)	4.6 (40.3)	2.1 (35.8)	1.0 (33.8)	2.5 (36.5)	4.3 (39.7)	7.7 (45.9)	11.1 (52.0)	13.8 (56.8)	8.1 (46.6)
Record low °C (°F)	4.0 (39.2)	2.0 (35.6)	−0.5 (31.1)	−6.8 (19.8)	−10.1 (13.8)	−11.5 (11.3)	−11.2 (11.8)	−11.1 (12.0)	−8.0 (17.6)	−5.5 (22.1)	−2.7 (27.1)	0.5 (32.9)	−11.5 (11.3)
Average precipitation mm (inches)	19.4 (0.76)	27.3 (1.07)	33.4 (1.31)	37.6 (1.48)	28.4 (1.12)	25.7 (1.01)	20.9 (0.82)	16.6 (0.65)	17.9 (0.70)	27.8 (1.09)	19.0 (0.75)	19.4 (0.76)	293.4 (11.55)
Average precipitation days (≥ 0.1 mm)	3.1	3.4	3.7	3.5	4.8	4.5	3.6	3.0	3.7	4.2	3.7	3.0	44.2
Average snowy days	0.0	0.0	0.0	0.0	0.0	0.0	0.1	0.1	0.0	0.0	0.0	0.0	0.1
Average relative humidity (%)	47.1	51.2	54.9	59.7	67.5	67.0	65.9	59.4	56.5	51.5	48.0	45.5	56.2
Mean monthly sunshine hours	313.1	271.2	238.7	192.0	148.8	126.0	151.9	167.4	183.0	238.7	270.0	291.4	2,592.2
Mean daily sunshine hours	10.1	9.6	7.7	6.4	4.8	4.2	4.9	5.4	6.1	7.7	9.0	9.4	7.1
Percentage possible sunshine	65.7	72.0	65.3	61.0	49.7	46.7	45.7	51.7	53.0	58.7	67.5	62.5	58.3
Source 1: Servicio Meteorológico Nacional
Source 2: Secretaria de Mineria (extremes and percent sun 1941–1990)
