= Las Grutas =

Town in Rio Negro Province, Argentina

Coordinates: 40°48′30″S 65°05′12″W

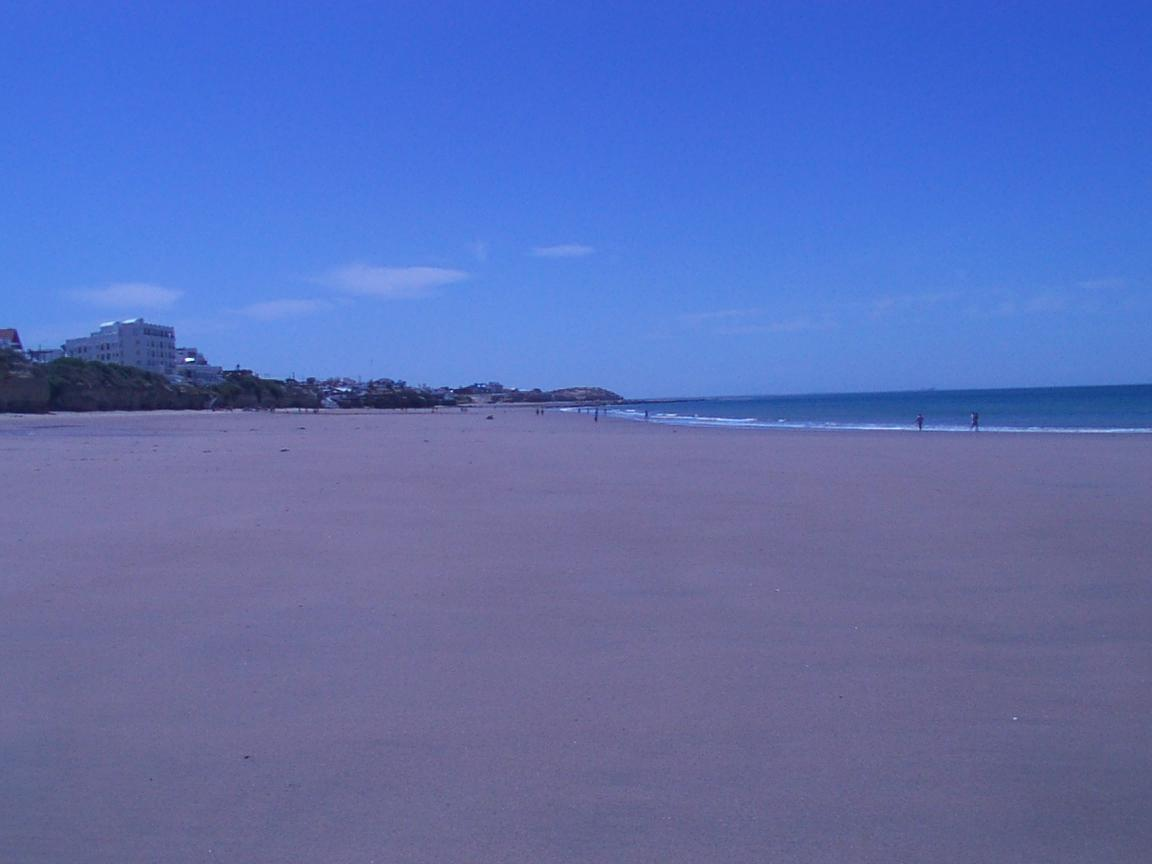
Wide beaches during low tide. View from the Third access towards the second.

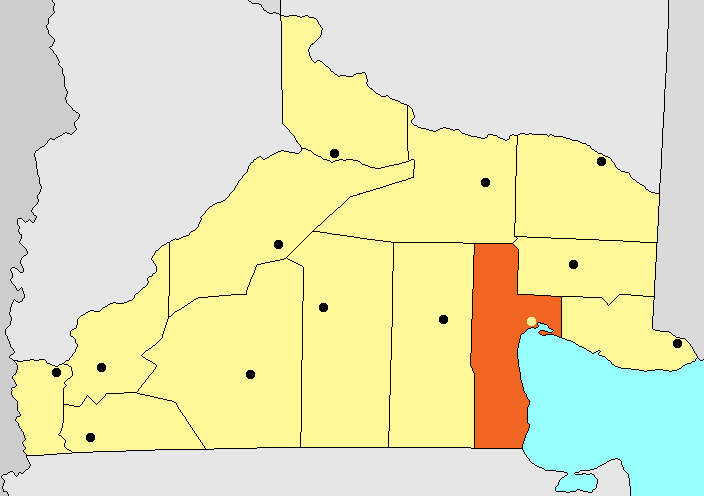
View of the San Antonio Department and the San Antonio Oeste city at the San Matías Gulf

Las Grutas is a beach resort town located in the Argentine province of Río Negro, in the department of San Antonio, with a stable population of 8,000 inhabitants.

It's located 15 kilometers south of San Antonio Oeste, and is visited by over 400,000 tourists every summer. Its beaches are known for having relatively warm waters in spite of their location in Patagonia, due to the wide tidal amplitude, and the protection of the San Matías Gulf. The town was founded in 1964, mainly as a group of campings, and soon began growing. But it was not until the 1980s that tourism industry finally exploded, with the construction of numerous apartment and a casino. southern right whales are seasonal residents and visit here.

Las Grutas', meaning "The Caves" in Spanish, comes from the caves created by the erosion of the sea on the cliffs that separate the city from the beach. The access to the beaches is therefore restricted to the existing 12 descends or "bajadas". Their names, from north to south, are "3 de febrero", "Los acantilados", "A.C.A.", "La rueda", "Cero", "Primera", "Segunda", "Tercera", "Cuarta", "Quinta", "Sexta" y "Séptima", the last seven named from first to seventh.

The first accesses where the ones named "Primera", "Segunda", and "Tercera" (first, second and third), to which new ones were added as the town, and the number of visitors grew.

Near the "Cero" access there are pools artificially carved in the stone that change their water in every tidal cycle. When the tide is low, the water in the pools is quickly warmed by the sun. In colder days, old people and children sometimes prefer to make use of the pools instead of the sea.

== Climate ==
Climate data for Las Grutas, Río Negro (1997–2011)
Month	Jan	Feb	Mar	Apr	May	Jun	Jul	Aug	Sep	Oct	Nov	Dec	Year
Record high °C (°F)	39.2 (102.6)	39.8 (103.6)	36.4 (97.5)	29.6 (85.3)	31.0 (87.8)	21.3 (70.3)	22.7 (72.9)	24.1 (75.4)	26.8 (80.2)	34.4 (93.9)	35.6 (96.1)	37.1 (98.8)	39.8 (103.6)
Mean daily maximum °C (°F)	26.2 (79.2)	26.7 (80.1)	24.1 (75.4)	19.6 (67.3)	15.3 (59.5)	12.4 (54.3)	12.5 (54.5)	14.5 (58.1)	16.1 (61.0)	18.3 (64.9)	22.7 (72.9)	26.4 (79.5)	19.6 (67.3)
Daily mean °C (°F)	21.0 (69.8)	20.9 (69.6)	18.9 (66.0)	14.3 (57.7)	10.6 (51.1)	8.0 (46.4)	7.7 (45.9)	9.4 (48.9)	11.0 (51.8)	13.1 (55.6)	17.6 (63.7)	20.7 (69.3)	14.4 (57.9)
Mean daily minimum °C (°F)	15.8 (60.4)	15.2 (59.4)	13.4 (56.1)	9.0 (48.2)	6.3 (43.3)	4.1 (39.4)	3.2 (37.8)	4.2 (39.6)	5.8 (42.4)	7.7 (45.9)	12.1 (53.8)	15.2 (59.4)	9.3 (48.7)
Record low °C (°F)	6.9 (44.4)	5.8 (42.4)	1.5 (34.7)	−1.3 (29.7)	−3.8 (25.2)	−4.9 (23.2)	−6.0 (21.2)	−7.3 (18.9)	−4.8 (23.4)	−2.4 (27.7)	0.8 (33.4)	5.2 (41.4)	−7.3 (18.9)
Average precipitation mm (inches)	15.7 (0.62)	16.1 (0.63)	47.1 (1.85)	9.7 (0.38)	16.9 (0.67)	6.8 (0.27)	6.9 (0.27)	6.1 (0.24)	8.4 (0.33)	40.3 (1.59)	12.9 (0.51)	5.8 (0.23)	189.9 (7.48)
Source: Departamento Provincial de Aguas
