= Chapadmalal, Buenos Aires =

Chapadmalal
- Town
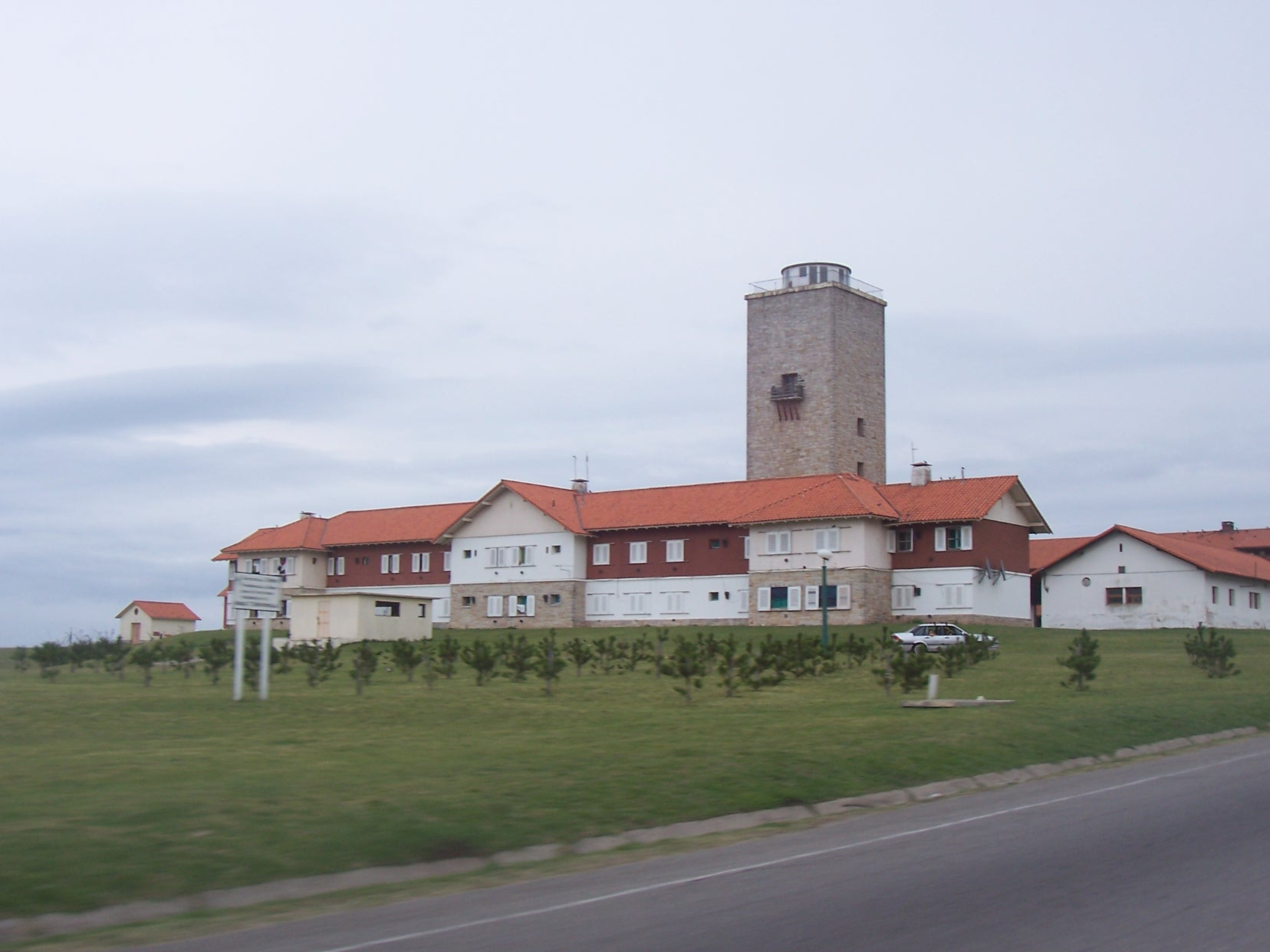

- Location within Buenos Aires Province
- Coordinates: 38°10′23″S 57°39′07″W
- Country: Argentina
- Province: Buenos Aires
- Partidos: General Pueyrredón
- Elevation: 82 m (269 ft)

Population (2001 Census)
  - Total: 1,323
- Time zone: UTC−3 (ART)
- CPA Base: B 7605
- Climate: Dfc

Chapadmalal is a resort town of the Atlantic Coast located in the General Pueyrredón Partido in the province of Buenos Aires, Argentina, near the city of Mar del Plata. It is a beach town, popular for surfing and other seaside activities.

== Geography ==
Chapadmalal is located 30 km (19 mi) from the city of Mar Del Plata.

== History ==
The town was named after a piece of land owned by a wealthy family in the region, which was first built in 1906. A golf course under the United States Golf Association was established in the town in 1945.

== Population ==
According to INDEC, which collects population data for the country, the town had a population of 1,323 people as of the 2001 census.
