= Costa del Este =

Town in Buenos Aires, Argentina

- Town
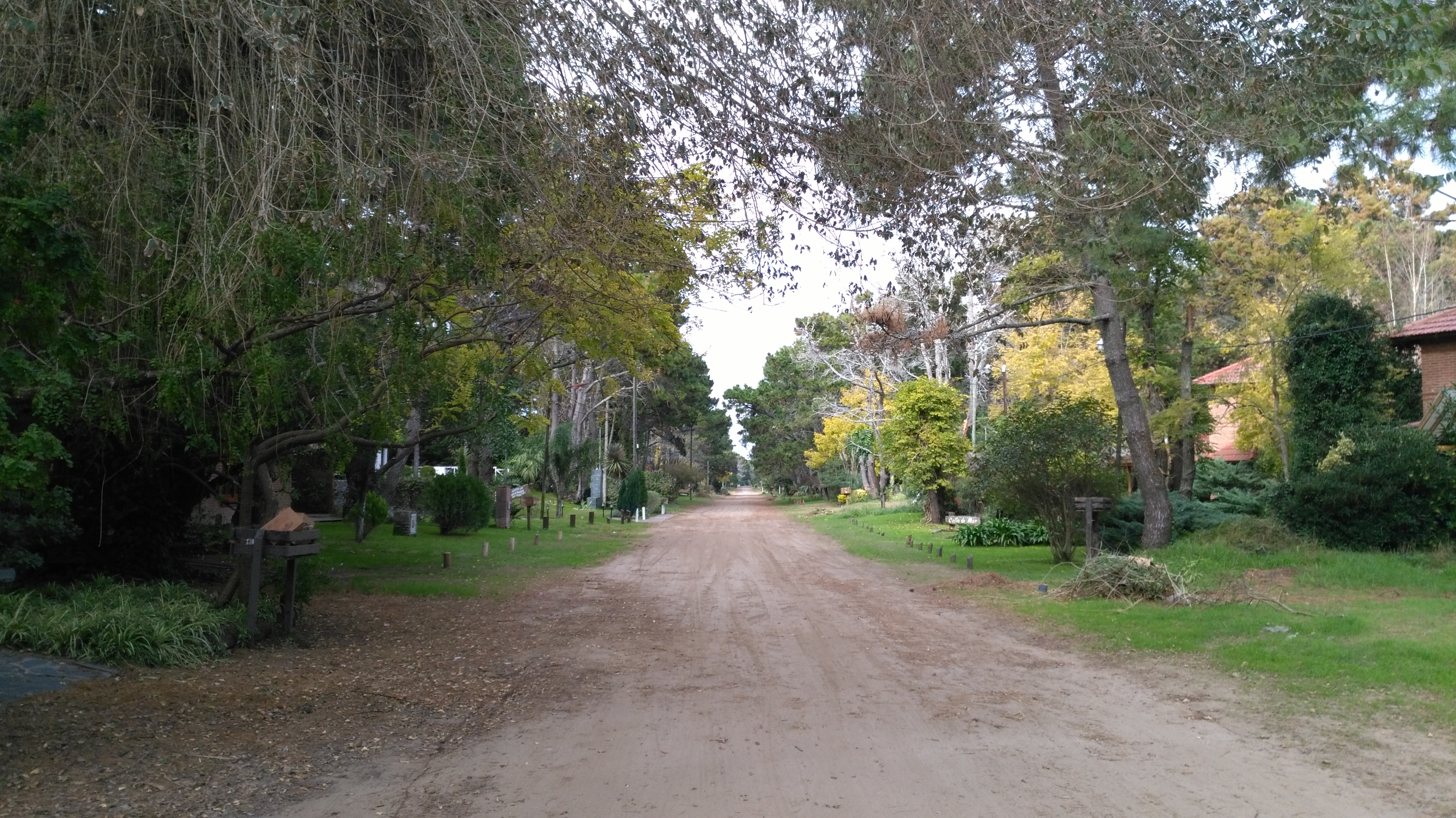
- Street of Costa del Este in its residential area

- Location of Costa del Este in Argentina
- Coordinates: 36.36°S 56.42°W
- Country: Argentina
- Province: Buenos Aires
- Partido: La Costa

Population (2001 census)
  - Total: 6,916
- Time zone: UTC−3 (ART)
- CPA base: M5517
- Dialing code: +54 02614
- Climate: CFB
- Website: Luján de Cuyo (in Spanish)

Costa del Este is a town in the province of Buenos Aires in Argentina, belonging to La Costa Partido. It is a luxury spa and health resort, located in the Atlantic Coast region. It borders Mar del Tuyú to the north and Aguas Verdes to the south.

== History ==
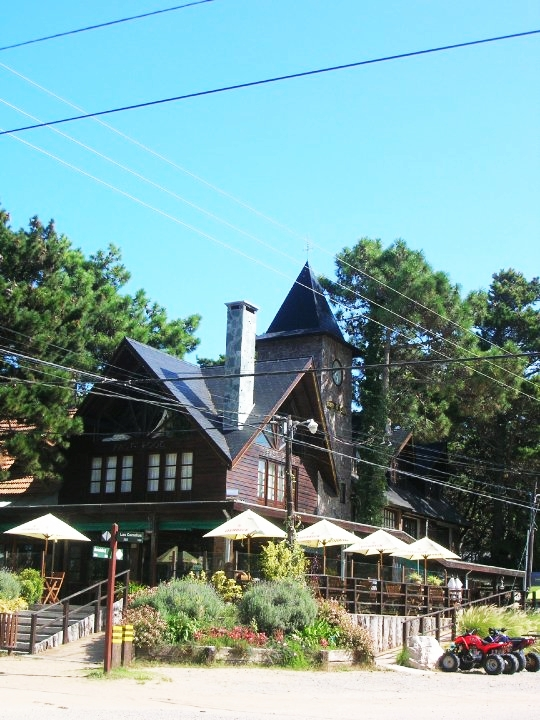
Typical architecture of Costa del Este.

The spa was founded in 1966, when it was still a desert place. Messrs. Fidel A. Zabalo, Emilio Doura and Marcelino Grizutti, who bought the land from the Duhau family, are considered founders. The fixing of dunes and paths were done without changing the undulating and smooth relief. For them, various tree species were planted, such as tamarisks and acacias, forming a densely forested dune. Later, eucalyptus, various species of pine, poplar and willow were added. Since then it was known as The Beach of a Million Pines. Thanks to the forestry work that was carried out, the town is densely forested. The streets are mostly sand, although the important ones are paved. Not by chance, they are named after species of trees or flowers. The person in charge of directing the forestation initially was the forestry technician Arnaldo Félix Esquivel and, at the direction of Mr. Doura, he outlined the project in the Uruguayan resort of Punta del Este, as well as being in charge of the San Clemente del Tuyú nursery, given that There the pine trees developed faster and he was the one who named the streets. Originally it was a closed neighborhood that, since it did not have the necessary critical number of owners capable of supporting the basic infrastructure with their contribution, in a neighborhood assembly they chose to municipalize the urban development, becoming an open neighborhood while maintaining certain characteristics and regulations that guarantee a rugged and distinctive architecture
