= Islote Lobos National Park =

National park in Argentina

Islote Lobos National Park Parque Nacional Islote Lobos
- IUCN category II (national park)
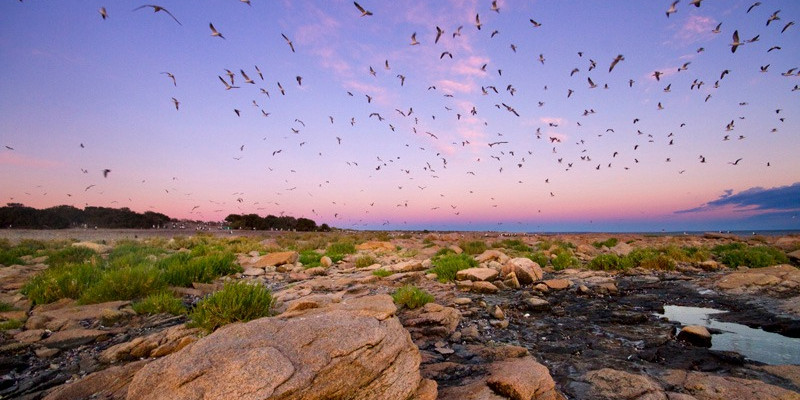
- Birds at the Islote Lobos National Park

- Location within Argentina
- Location: Río Negro province, Argentina
- Nearest city: Sierra Grande, Río Negro and Playas Doradas
- Coordinates: 41°25′55″S 65°03′31″W
- Area: 19.0792 km^{2} (7.37 mi^{2})
- Established: 2020
- Governing body: Administración de Parques Nacionales

Islote Lobos National Park (Spanish: Parque Nacional Islote Lobos) is a protected natural area located over the San Matías Gulf on the Atlantic coast of Río Negro province, about 50 km from the town of Sierra Grande and adjacent to the town of Playas Doradas, San Antonio department, in Argentine Patagonia. The park is a coastal strip of approximately 20 km that includes a complex of six rocky promontories close to the shore: Lobos, La Pastosa, Ortiz Norte, Ortiz Sur, Redondo, and de los Pájaros.

From a phytogeographic perspective, the terrestrial part corresponds to the ecoregion of plains and plateaus. The area has had provincial protection since 1977, and on 30 July 2020, the project to convert it into a national park was announced.

== General characteristics and history ==
The reserve was created in 1977 through provincial decree No. 1402/77 with the aim of preserving the species and genetic diversity of the region. At the time of its creation, it was estimated to cover an area of approximately 2,400 hectares around 41°24′S 65°00′W (a spot that is in the ocean).

Subsequently, it was established that the protected area would consist of a rectangle approximately 8,000 meters long in the north-south direction, coinciding with the coastline, and about 5 km wide, of which 1 km would be on land and 4 km over the sea. These lines delineate a surface area of 4,000 hectares. Currently, the protected area covers 19,079.20 hectares.

The complex is formed by six rocky promontories —"Lobos", "La Pastosa", "Ortiz Norte", "Ortiz Sur", "Redondo", and "de los Pájaros"— some of which are covered with sedimentary material and emerge a short distance from the coast. During low tide, they are connected to the mainland, exposing extensive rocky or sandy surfaces, pools, saltwater wells, and isolated rocks.

On 30 July 2020, the project to convert it into a national park was announced. To realize this, the province of Río Negro ceded the ownership of that territory to the nation through a provincial law on 20 November of the same year. On 16 June 2022, the National Congress accepted this cession and created the new national park in the same law.

== Biodiversity of the park ==
=== Vegetation ===
Vegetation cover is not the most prominent aspect of the protected area; for example, one of the islets, the Lobos Islet, is completely devoid of vegetation. The other islets feature vegetation adapted to the saline environment, such as the perennial glasswort and espartillo, which alternate in the more inland areas with some specimens of molle, llaollín, zampa, jume, jarrilla, and white flechilla.
