= San Antonio Department, Río Negro =

San Antonio Departamento San Antonio
- Department
- Location of San Antonio within Río Negro
- Country: Argentina
- Province: Río Negro
- Capital: San Antonio Oeste

Area
  - Total: 14,015 km^{2} (5,411 sq mi)

Population (2022)
  - Total: 35,800
  - Density: 2.55/km^{2} (6.62/sq mi)

San Antonio is a department of the province of Río Negro (Argentina).
