= Mar del Sur =

Beach town in Argentina

Coordinates: 38°21′S 57°59′W

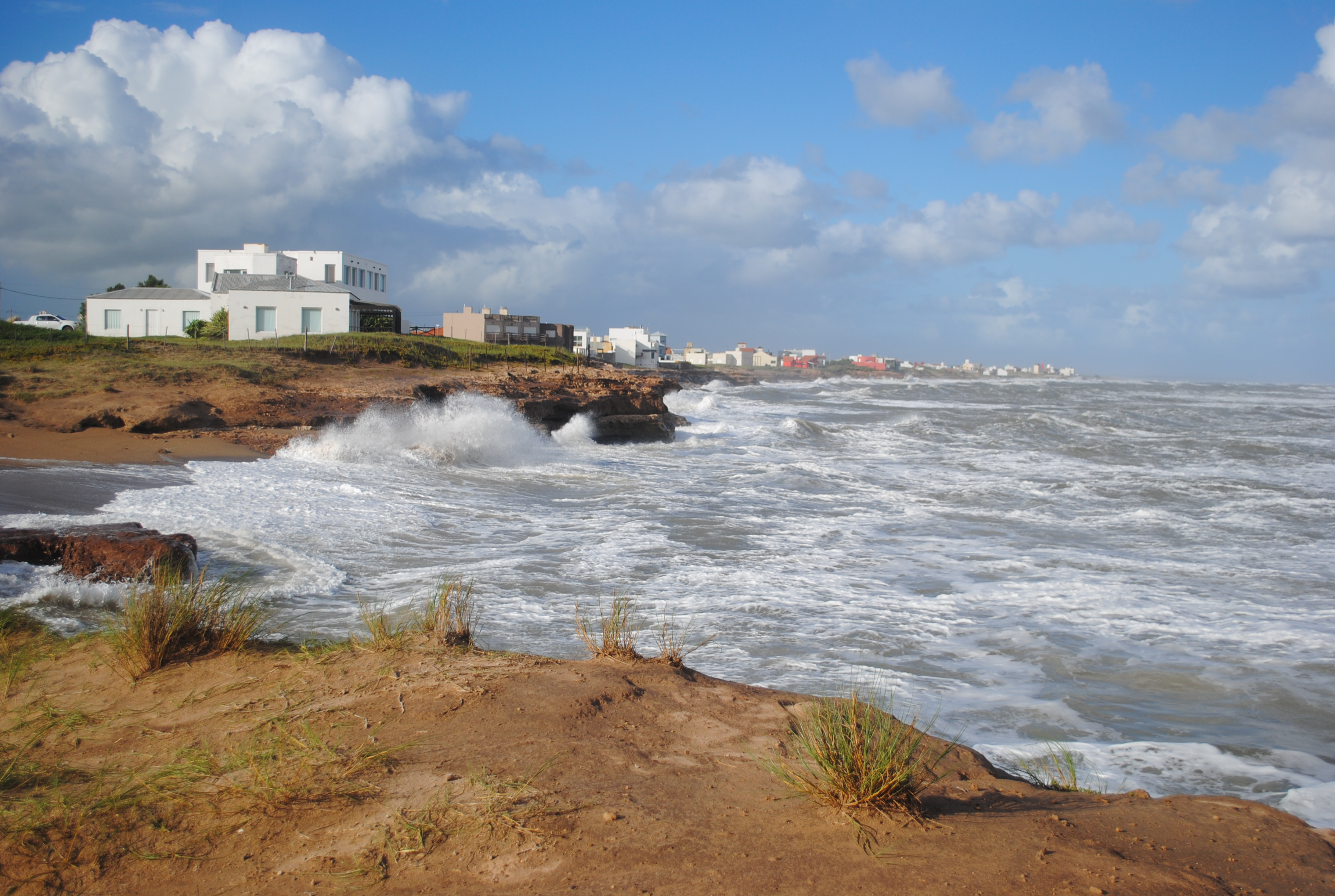

Mar del Sur or Mar del Sud is an Argentine beach town along the coast a few miles south west of Mar del Plata in Buenos Aires Province. This growing vacation area is down a major highway from Mar del Plata, one of the most popular vacation cities in South America. Mar del Sur is one of the oldest vacation towns in Argentina.

== Economy ==
Mar del Sur concentrates on beach vacationing from locals and other tourists from Argentina and other areas of South America. A satellite view shows the nature of this location in detail. Tourism in Argentina has experienced a dramatic and welcome increase in recent years.

== Attractions ==
The main beach provides access for the southern beaches. Mar del Sur is located just a few miles on Highway 11 from two famous beach resorts being from this point north Miramar and Mar del Plata. Necochea is located past the beach access to the south of Mar del Sur, and is easily traveled to over major highways. In addition to the large casinos and show venues of Mar del Plata, the beaches and sea fishing are very popular.

== Transportation ==
Six airports both commercial and regional are located within just a few miles of the Mar del Sur beach resort. The airports are Estancia el Premol, Bellmar, Miramar, San Martin, Estancia Ballenara, and Estancia La Totorro South. More and larger airports are located up the coast near Mar del Plata.
