= Punta Mogotes =

Beach in Mar del Plata, Argentina

Coordinates: 38.050°S 57.567°W

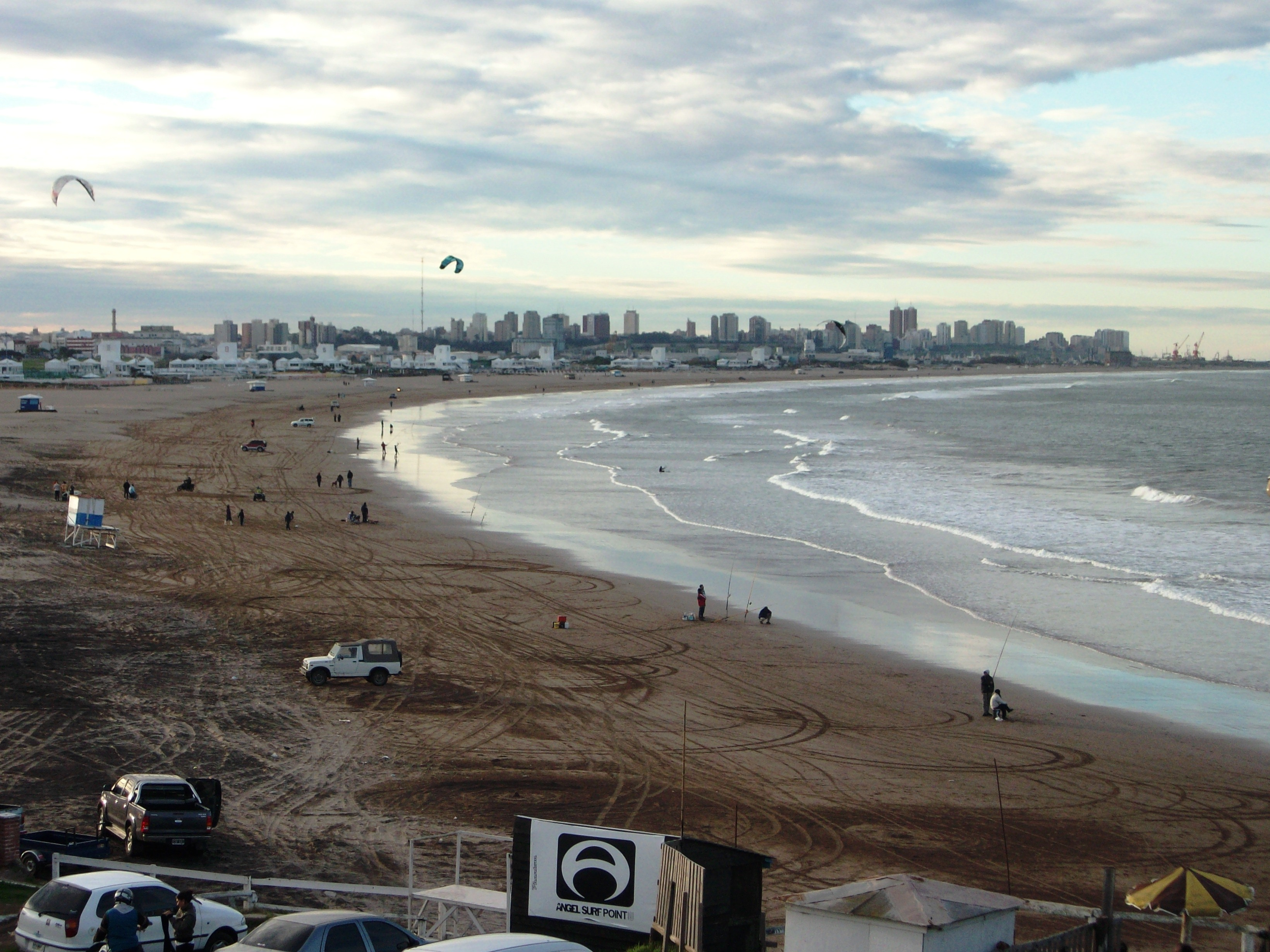
Punta Mogotes beach from the south

Punta Mogotes is an open beach area and an adjacent neighbourhood located in Mar del Plata, Argentina, some three kilometres (2 mi) south-west of the city's port. The coastline was largely high dunes and a somewhat wild landscape until 1980, when a large compound of resort facilities and paved roads was built right along the beach.
