= Patricio Peralta Ramos =

Argentine businessman

Patricio Peralta-Ramos
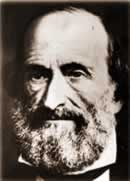
- Born: May 17, 1814; San Nicolás, Buenos Aires, Argentina
- Died: April 25, 1887 (aged 72); Mar del Plata, Buenos Aires, Argentina
- Occupation: Businessman

Patricio Peralta-Ramos (born Patricio Pascual Porcel de Peralta y Ramos; May 17, 1814 – April 25, 1887) was an Argentine businessman and landowner prominent in the foundation of the seaside city of Mar del Plata.

== Life and times ==
Patricio Peralta-Ramos was born in the San Nicolás, a Buenos Aires neighbourhood, in 1814. His father, Juan José Porcel de Peralta y de las Casas, was a high-ranking official of the Patricios Regiment. In 1860, he married a distant relative, Cecilia Robles, with whom he had twelve children.

Peralta-Ramos became a large clothing supplier to the Argentine Army during the 1829-52 regime of Governor Juan Manuel de Rosas, of whom Peralta-Ramos became an official supporter in 1842. A wealthy man by the time of Rosas' overthrow at the 1852 Battle of Caseros, he traveled in 1860 to the Atlantic Ocean shore, where he purchased over 136,000 hectares (340,000 acres) from Portuguese Consul and entrepreneur José Coelho de Meyrelles, and a meat salting house.

His beef jerky facility struggling, Peralta-Ramos embarked on the initial real estate development of his vast, scenic land. His enterprise met with the resistance of the gentry of Balcarce (then the county seat), though in 1865, he obtained a favorable ruling for the shoreline development from the local Justice of Peace, Juan Peña. Seizing on a discrepancy between Peralta-Ramos' holdings and what appeared in the official appraisal, Balcarce founder and Mayor José Chaves nearly forced his adversary to relocate his planned development on marshland, but an 1867 letter in Peralta-Ramos' support by neighboring Mar Chiquita Judge José Bernal to Buenos Aires Province official Nicolás Avellaneda settled the dispute in Peralta-Ramos' favor.

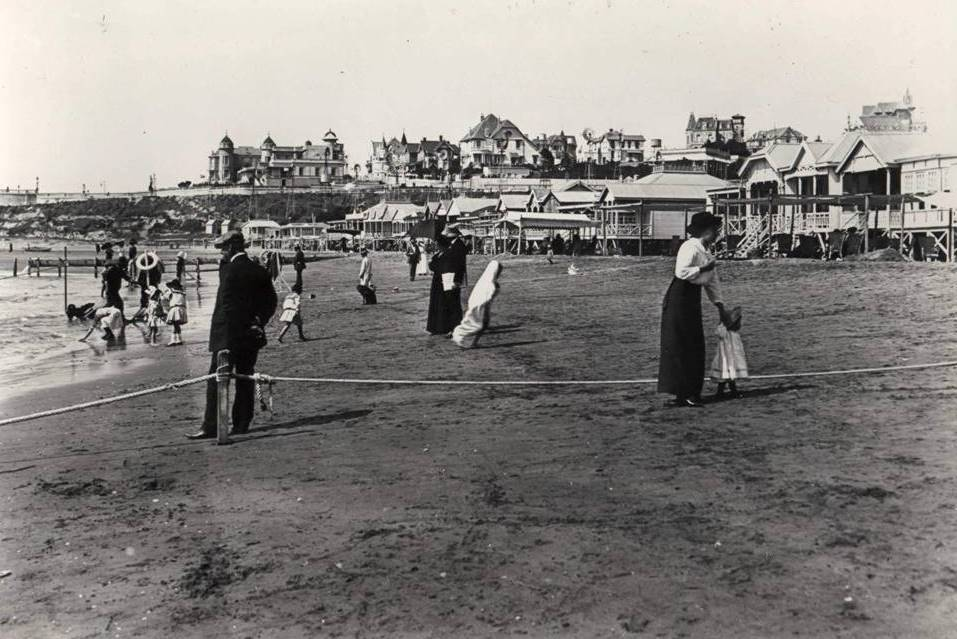
Mar del Plata's Bristol Beach, around 1910

Advertising the development as Puerto de la Laguna de los Padres, the sale of allotments was successful, and in 1873, Peralta-Ramos petitioned the province for the seaside hamlet's incorporation, which was granted by Governor Mariano Acosta on February 10, 1874, as Puerto Balcarce. As this nomenclature was assigned over his objections, Peralta-Ramos unofficially christened the community Mar del Plata (in the sense of "Sea of the River Plate region").

The accomplishment was clouded, however, by the death of his wife, Cecilia, in honor of whom Peralta-Ramos personally designed and built the Saint Cecilia Chapel; the structure, poignantly, was built by the mourning widower from wooden planks salvaged from a recent wreckage.

Boasting seaside appeal, an iron pier and made self-sufficient by the salting house, as well as by a flour mill, bakery, blacksmith and other establishments, the community prospered. In his later years, Peralta-Ramos promoted the hunt of the area's then-vast herds of sea lions, which he termed "an inexhaustible source of wealth."

He died in Mar del Plata in 1887, and his remains were buried initially at Saint Cecilia chapel and some years later reburied at the La Recoleta Cemetery in Buenos Aires.
