= Saladero =

Salted meat industry in Argentina and Uruguay

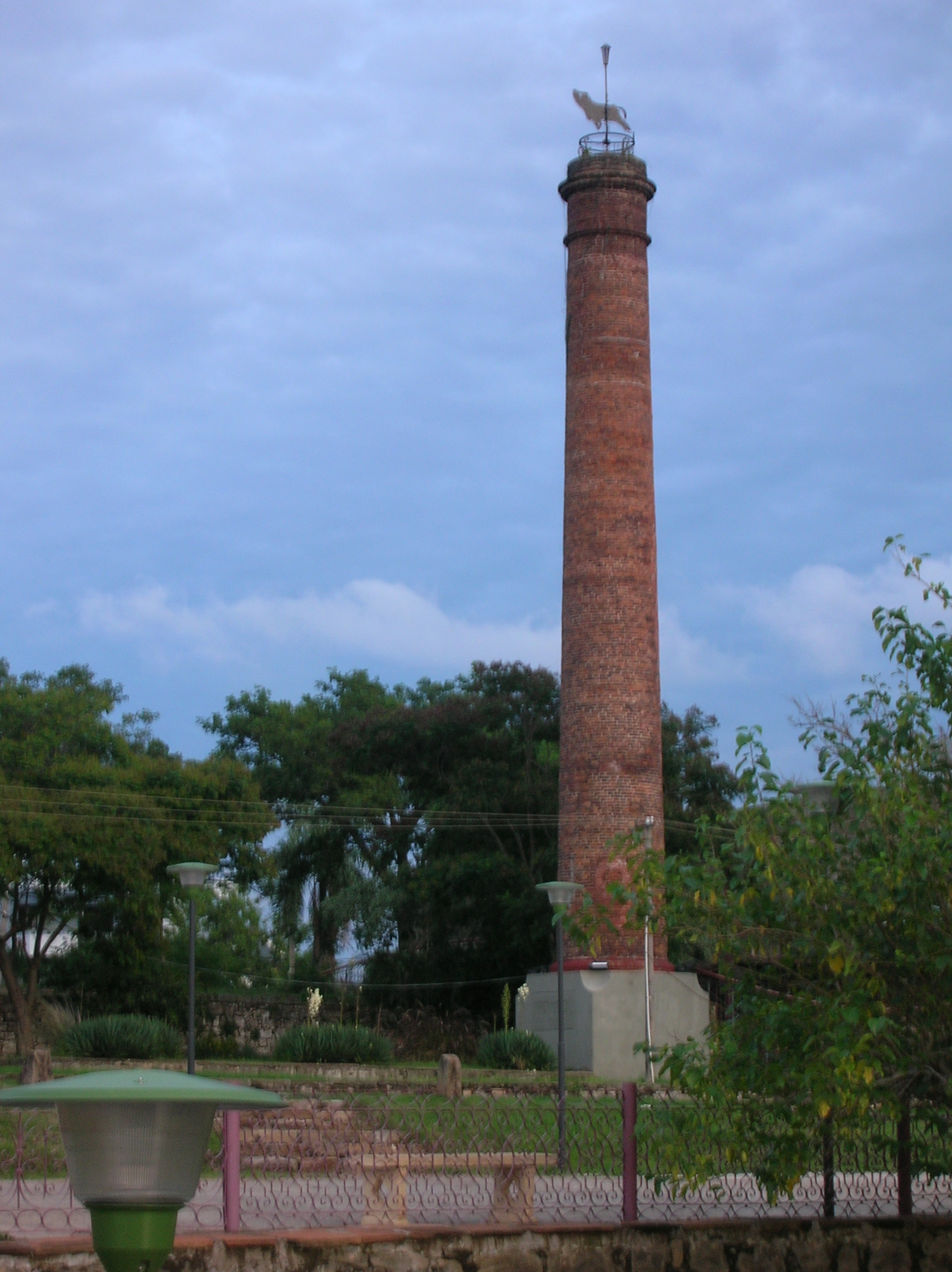
Chimney of an old saladero in Salto, Uruguay.

A saladero was a basic industry that produced salted meat. It was one of the earliest industries of Argentina and Uruguay after the Argentine War of Independence and benefited from the expansion of a landed class into the Humid Pampas.

Most of the production was sold to Cuba and Brazil to feed enslaved laborers. In time, it expanded into other products including extracting the leather, horns and fat from cows (fat was useful for public lighting, soaps and candles). By the 1840s, saladeros employed steam engines and encouraged foreign investments. During the last quarter of the nineteenth century, saladeros, along with enslaved labor, declined with the expansion of refrigeration techniques.

Known as one of the early sites of union organization, in 1854 saladero workers in Gualeguaychú, Argentina organized a strike. The administrator had failed to pay them.

== See also ==
- Hacienda
