= Playas Doradas =

Coordinates: 41°37′52″S 65°01′45″W

- Municipality and village
- Interactive map of Playas Doradas
- Country: Argentina
- Province: Río Negro Province
- Time zone: UTC−3 (ART)

Playas Doradas is a village and municipality in Río Negro Province in Argentina.
