= San Antonio Este =

Coordinates: 40°48′54″S 64°45′26″W

- Municipality and village
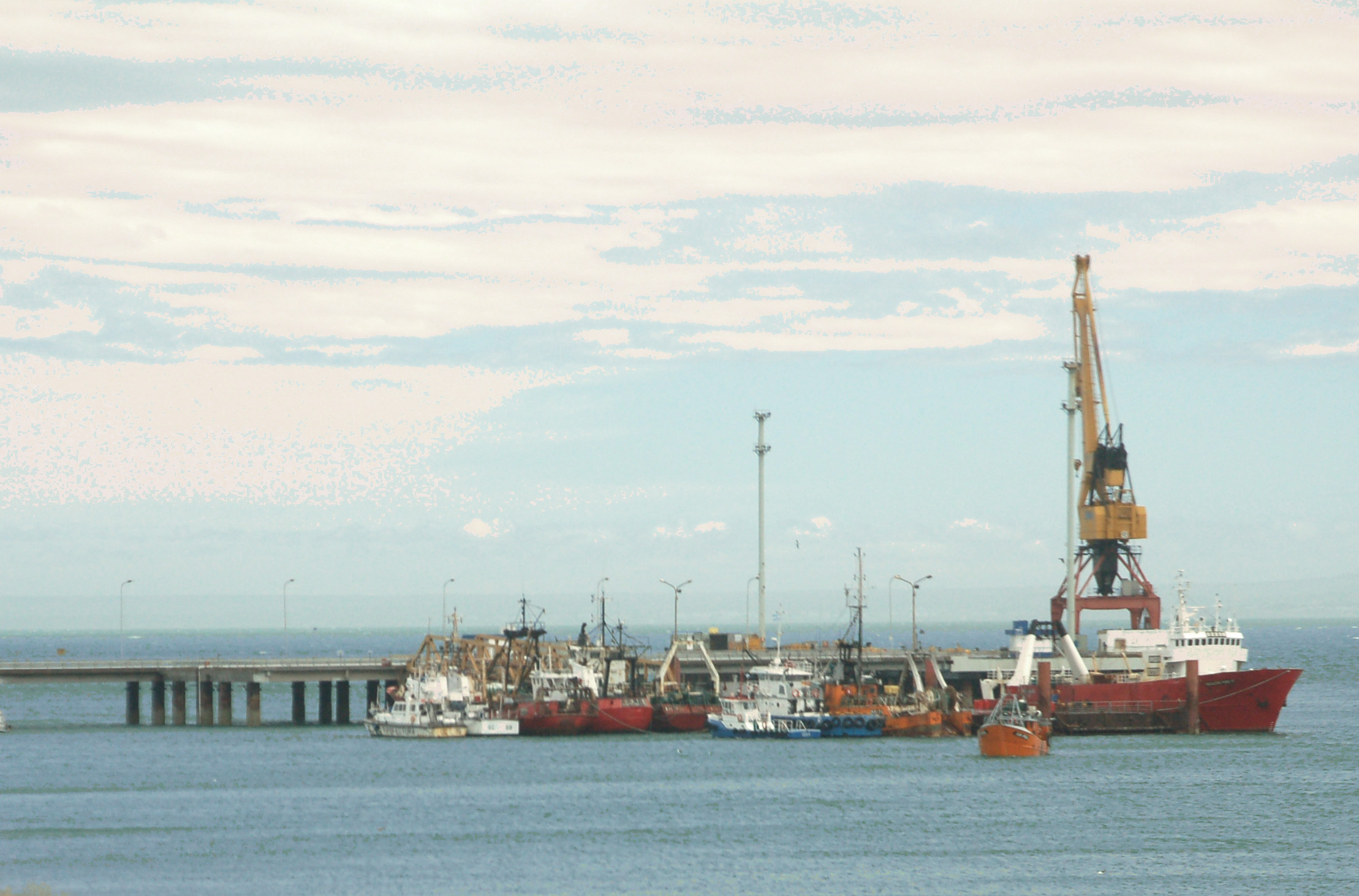
- Port of San Antonio Este
- Interactive map of San Antonio Este
- Country: Argentina
- Province: Río Negro Province
- Time zone: UTC−3 (ART)

San Antonio Este is a village and municipality in Río Negro Province in Argentina.
