= Attalia (disambiguation) =

Attalia is the ancient name of Antalya, a city on the Mediterranean coast of southwestern Turkey.

Attalia, Atalia, Athaliah, or similar spellings may also refer to:

== Boats ==
- Attalia 32, a French sailboat design

== Media ==
- Atalia (Mayr), an 1822 oratorio by Simon Mayr
- Atalia, a 1984 Israeli film
- Athalia (Handel), a 1733 oratorio by George Frideric Handel
- Athaliah (opera), 1964 opera by Hugo Weisgall
- Athalie, a 1691 play by French playwright Jean Racine based on the biblical story of Athaliah, the queen of Judah
- Attalia (Libya), a defunct Arabic-language weekly newspaper in Tripoli

== People ==
- Athaliah, a queen of Judah
- Atalia, an ancient Assyrian queen

== Places ==
- Attalea in Lydia
- Athalia, Ohio, US
- Attalia, Washington, US

== Science ==
- Attalia, a synonym for Galinthias, a genus of praying mantis
- Athalia, a genus of sawflies belonging to the family Tenthredinidae
- 515 Athalia, a minor planet
- Atalia, a synonym for Clubiona, a genus of spiders
- Attalea (plant), a genus of plants

== See also ==
- Adalia (disambiguation), alternate spelling
- Atalya (disambiguation)
