= Provincial Route 36 (Buenos Aires) =

Highway in Argentina

Provincial Route 36
- Ruta provincial 36
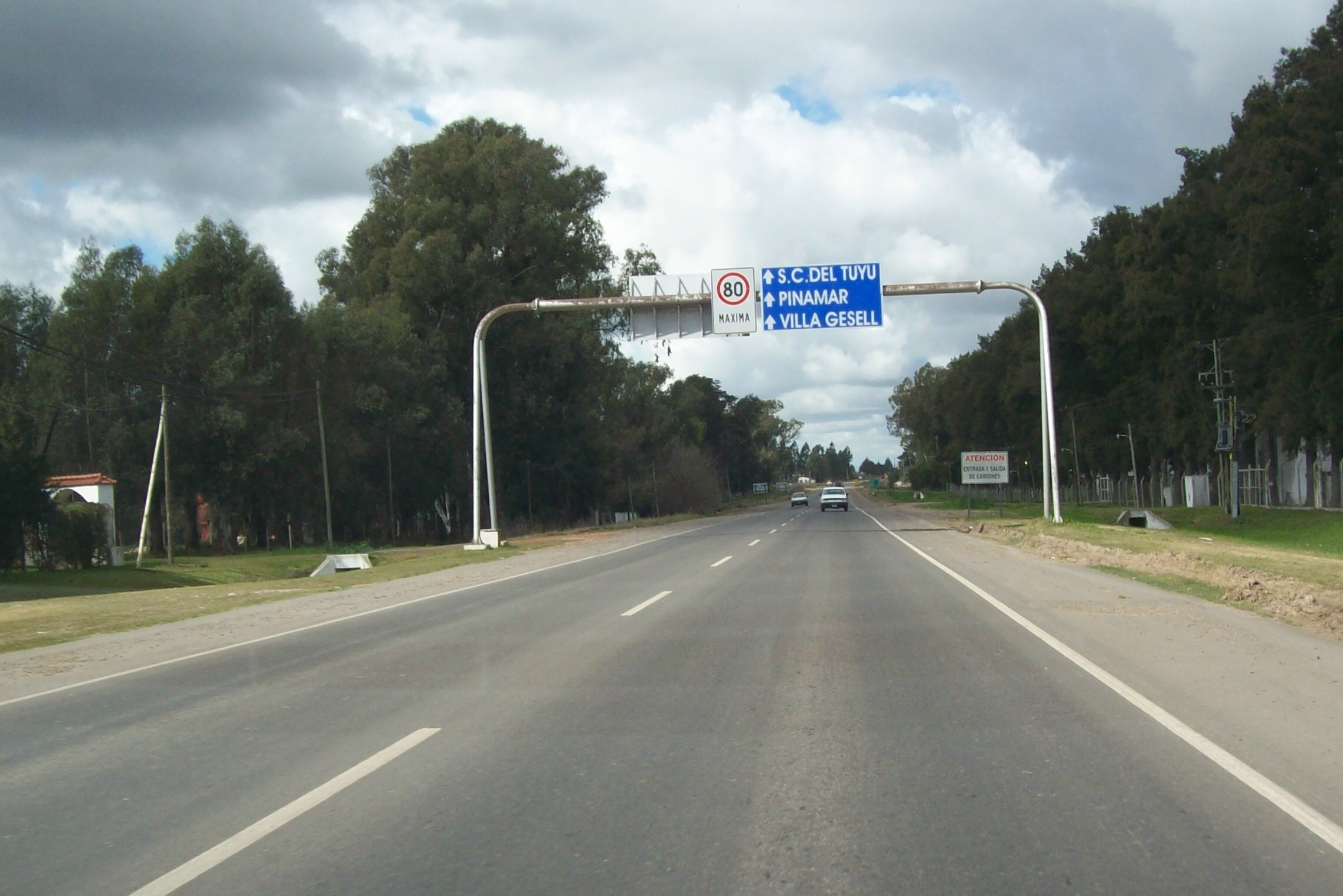
- View of the PR36 in El Pato

Route information
- Length: 155 km (96 mi)

Major junctions
- Northeast end: New Pueyrredón Bridge in Avellaneda
- Southeast end: in Pipinas

Location
- Country: Argentina
- Municipalities: Berazategui, Florencio Varela, La Plata, Magdalena, Punta Indio, Punta Indio, Quilmes

Highway system
- Highways in Argentina

Provincial Route 36 is a 155 km (96 mi) long paved highway located in the eastern province of Buenos Aires, in Argentina. It joins the Matanza River in the city of Avellaneda and the junction with Provincial Route 11, next to Samborombón Bay, 7 km (4.3 mi) southeast of Pipinas.

== Names of avenues ==
As this route passes through urban crossings, the different municipalities give it different names depending on the partido it crosses:

- Avellaneda Partido: Avenida Presidente Bartolomé Mitre
- Quilmes Partido: Avenida Los Quilmes and Avenida Calchaquí
- Quilmes and Florencio Varela Partido: Avenida Calchaquí
- Florencio Varela and Berazategui Partido: Avenida Calchaquí
- Berazategui Partido: Avenida El Pato
- La Plata Partido: Calle 191
