= General Mansilla =

General Mansilla may refer to:

- Lucio Norberto Mansilla (1789–1871), Argentine Confederation general
- Lucio Victorio Mansilla (1831–1913), Argentine general
- Williams Mansilla (born 1964), Guatemalan general
- General Mansilla, Buenos Aires, a settlement in Magdalena Partido, Buenos Aires Province, Argentina
