= Atalaya =

Atalaya (Spanish for watchtower) may refer to:

== Places ==
=== Spain ===
- Atalaya, Badajoz, a municipality in the province of Badajoz, Extremadura
- Atalaya (Madrid), a ward in Madrid
- Atalaya del Cañavate, a municipality in the province of Cuenca, Castile-La Mancha
- La Atalaya, Salamanca, a municipality in the province of Salamanca, Castile and León
- Atalaya Castle (Spain), a Moorish structure in Villena, province of Alicante
- La Atalaya, a former village that was destroyed to expand the Corta Atalaya open-pit mine
- Atalayas de Alcalá, (Talaies d'Alcalà), a mountain range in the Valencian Community

=== Puerto Rico ===
- Atalaya, Aguada, Puerto Rico, a barrio
- Atalaya, Rincón, Puerto Rico, a barrio

=== Elsewhere ===
- Atalaya, Buenos Aires, a settlement in Magdalena Partido, Argentina
- Atalaya, a part of the Guatemalan archaeological site Q'umarkaj
- Atalaya District, Veraguas Province, Panama
- Atalaya, Veraguas, capital of Atalaya District, Panama
- Atalaya Province, Peru
- Atalaya, Ucayali, Ucayali region, Peru
- Atalaya Castle (US), a mansion in South Carolina
- Atalaya Mountain, a hill in the Sangre de Cristo Mountains, Santa Fe, New Mexico, USA

== Other uses ==
- Atalaya (plant), a genus of flowering plants in the family Sapindaceae

== See also ==
- Atalaia (disambiguation)
- Atalya (disambiguation)
