= Tronador (rocket) =

Argentine proposed expendable launch system

Tronador (Spanish for Thunderer) is a series of Argentine rockets, including the Tronador I and Tronador II vehicles, to develop a liquid-propellant rocket expendable launch system called ISCUL (Inyector Satelital de Cargas Utiles Ligeras, Light-Payload Satellite Launcher).

The Tronador I is an unguided liquid-fueled rocket used for sub-orbital test flights. Its development led to the larger VEx test rocket, testing technologies needed for the Tronador II, which has a guidance system and would be capable of reaching low Earth orbit. Development of the satellite launch vehicle has cost more than 600 million dollars over several years.

== Tronador I ==
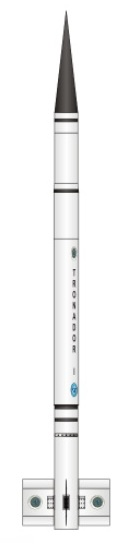
Tronador I

The Tronador I is an unguided liquid-fueled rocket used for sub-orbital test flights.

=== Tronador I (T1) ===
The Tronador I (T1) vehicle was flown successfully on June 6, 2007 from Puerto Belgrano Naval Base near Bahía Blanca, in the southeast of the Buenos Aires Province. This was the first flight of a technology demonstrator vehicle for the program.

==== Characteristics ====
- Length: 3,400 mm
- Stages: 1
- Total takeoff mass: 60 kg
- Payload mass: 4 kg
- Thrust (x 10 s): 500 kgf

=== Tronador Ib (T2) ===
The Tronador Ib (T2) vehicle was flown successfully on August 5, 2008 from Puerto Belgrano Naval Base. This was the second technology demonstrator vehicle flown for the program.

==== Characteristics ====
- Length: 3,400 mm
- Stages: 1
- Total takeoff mass: 60 kg
- Payload mass: 4 kg
- Apogee: 15–20 km
- Thrust (10 s): 1,500 kgf

=== VS-30 ===
This was the first cooperative test flight between Comisión Nacional de Actividades Espaciales and Brazilian Space Agency; it was successfully flown in December 2007 (Operacion Angicos). The payload built by CONAE, carried out several experiments to validate subsystems for the program such as: IMU (Inertial Measurements Unit, that used IFOG's), GPS receptor (for navigation), all integrated into the on-board computer, and an attitude control system via cold-gas thrusters. The payload unit completed a suborbital flight carried by an AEB-built VS-30 solid-propellant rocket booster, and was then recovered from the sea after landing with parachutes.

==== Characteristics ====
- Length: 3,288 mm (Payload module)
- Stages: 1 (VS-30 booster)
- Total takeoff mass: 1,500 kg
- Payload mass: 242.1 kg
- Apogee: 120–160 km
- Specific Impulse: 266 s (VS-30 booster)

== Tronador II ==
Tronador II
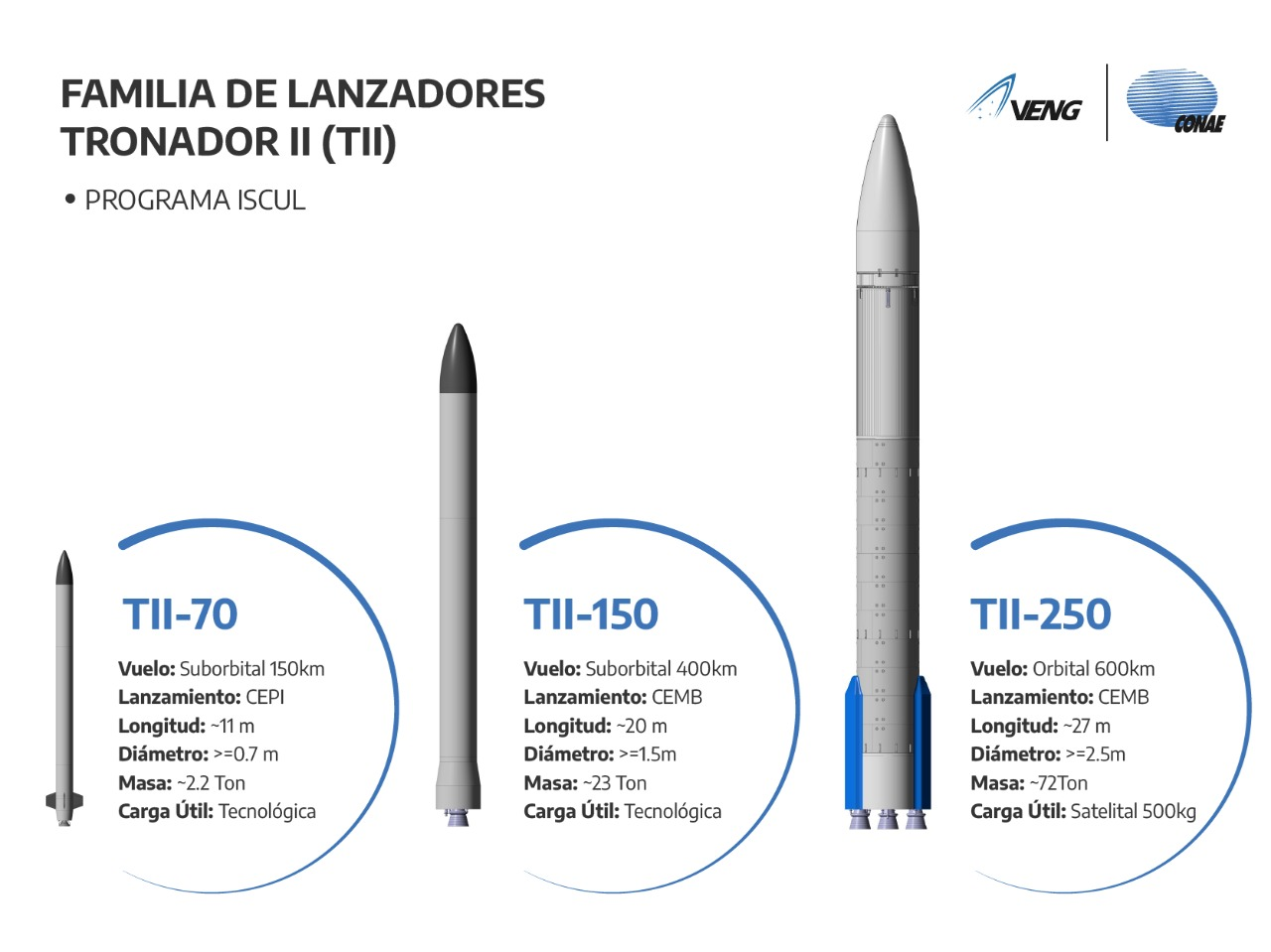
- Function: Orbital launch vehicle
- Manufacturer: VENG
- Country of origin: Argentina

Size
- Height: 27 m (89 ft)
- Diameter: 2.5 m (8 ft 2 in)
- Mass: 72,000 kg (159,000 lb) (including propellant)
- Stages: 2

Capacity

Payload to Polar
- Mass: 600 kg (1,300 lb)

Launch history
- Status: Under development
- Launch sites: Manuel Belgrano Space Center
- First flight: 2030

First stage
- Powered by: 3 RS-2
- Maximum thrust: 882 kN total
- Propellant: LOX / RP-1

Second stage
- Powered by: 1 MT-B
- Maximum thrust: 14 to 40 kN
- Propellant: LOX / RP-1

As of 2020, Tronador II's maiden orbital launch is expected to fly in "the next 4 years", according to the National Commission for Space Activities.

=== Early proposals ===
The initial proposal was for a 3-stage rocket. In early 2015, an evolved configuration was presented at the 52nd Committee on Peaceful Uses of Ultra-Terrestrial Space meeting and at the Punta Indio (35.523496°S 57.1846139°W) test launch pad:

- First Stage: 90 t total thrust (3 × 30 t engines)
- Second Stage: 30 t thrust
- Third stage: 4 t thrust
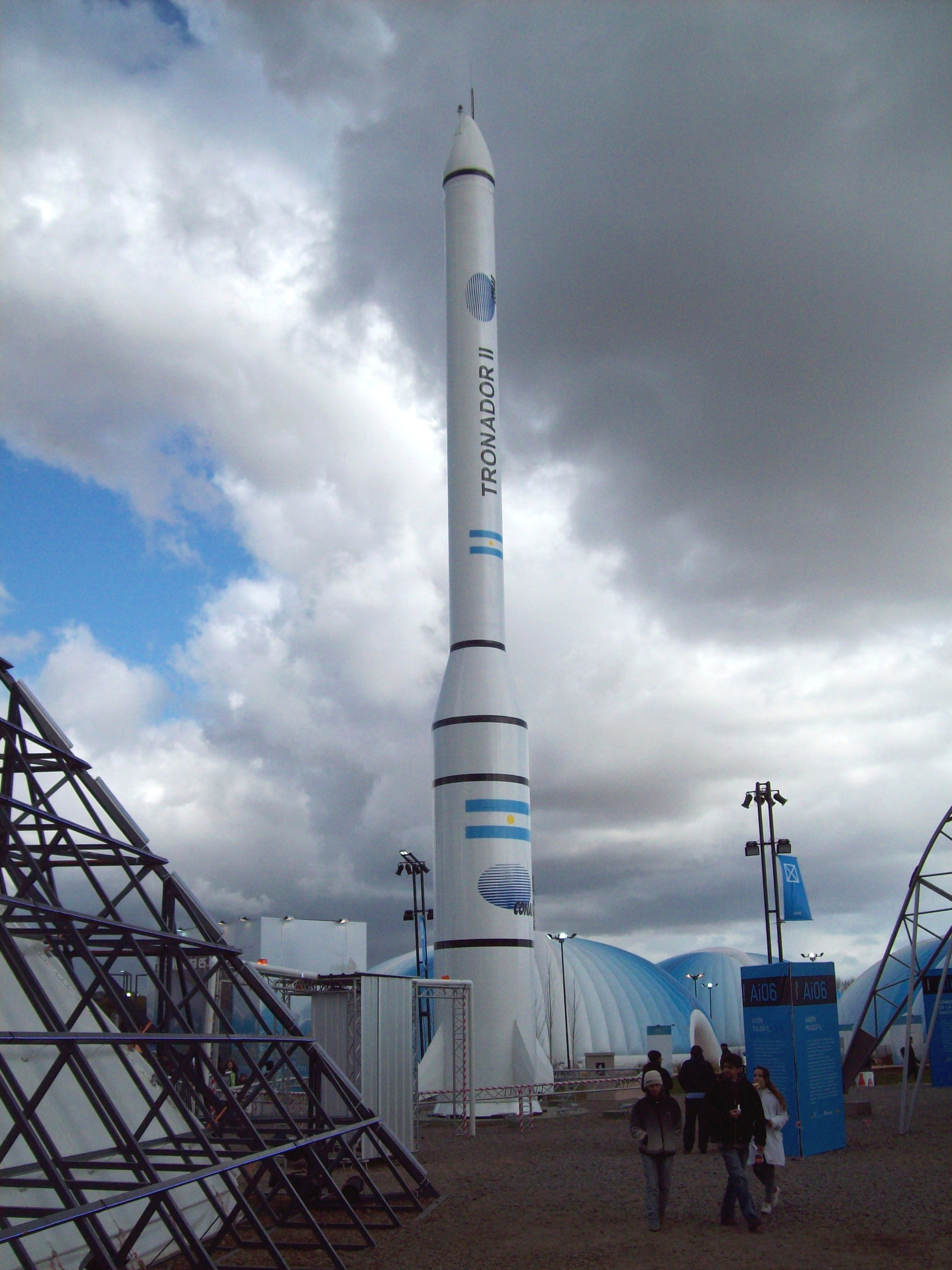

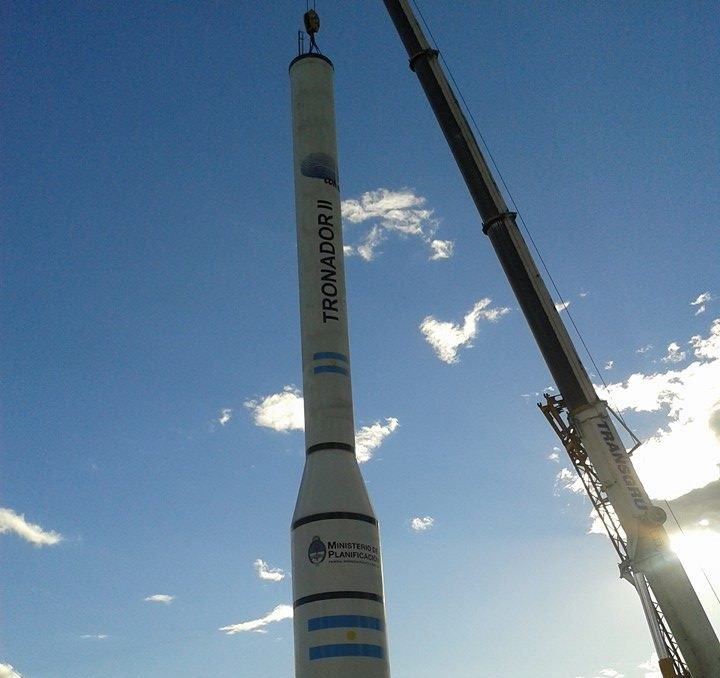

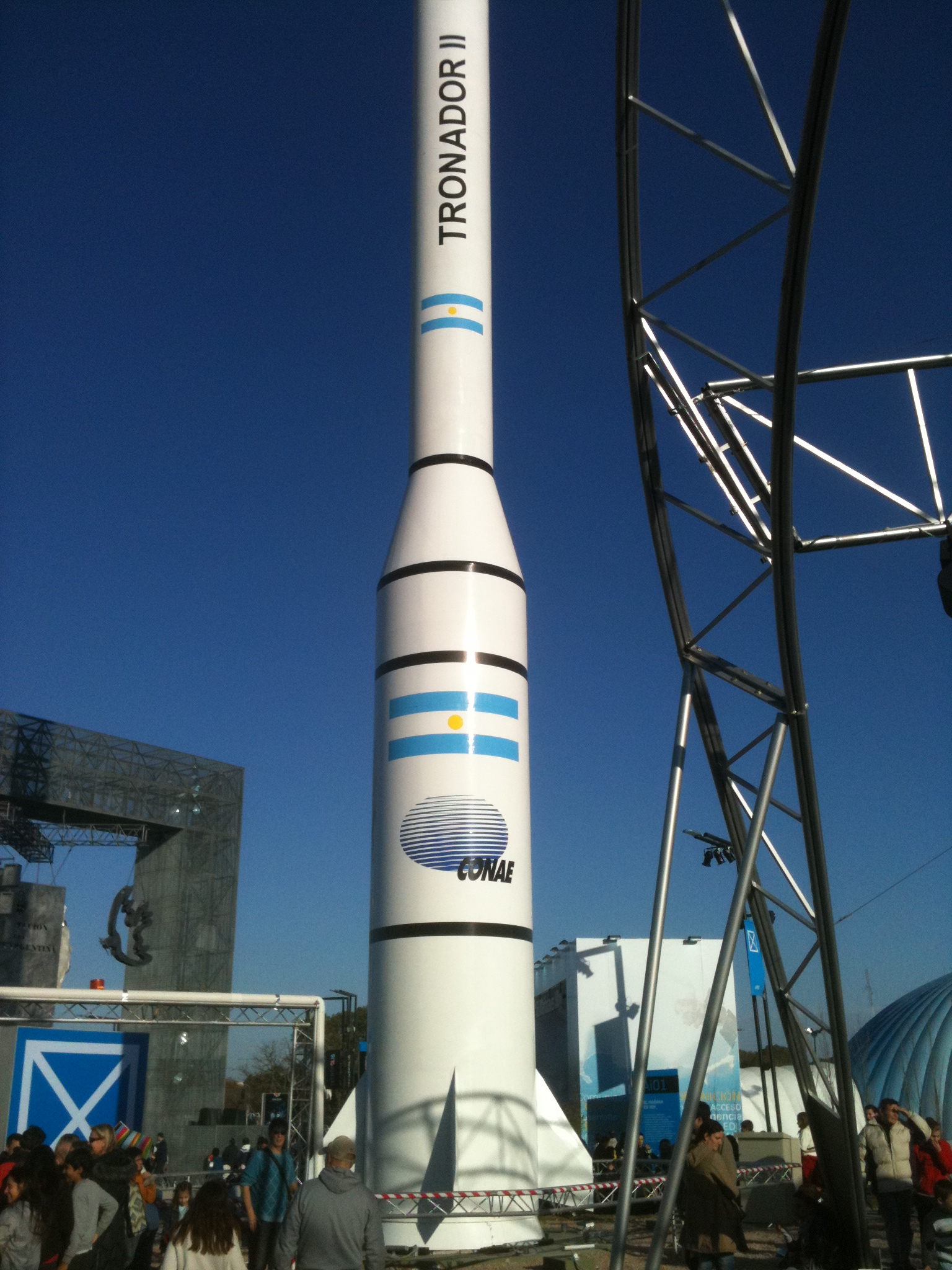

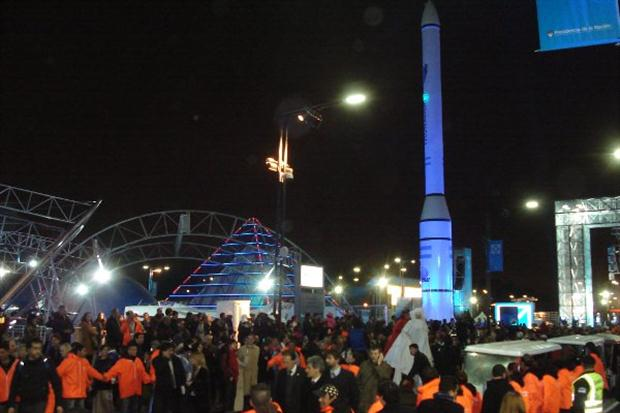

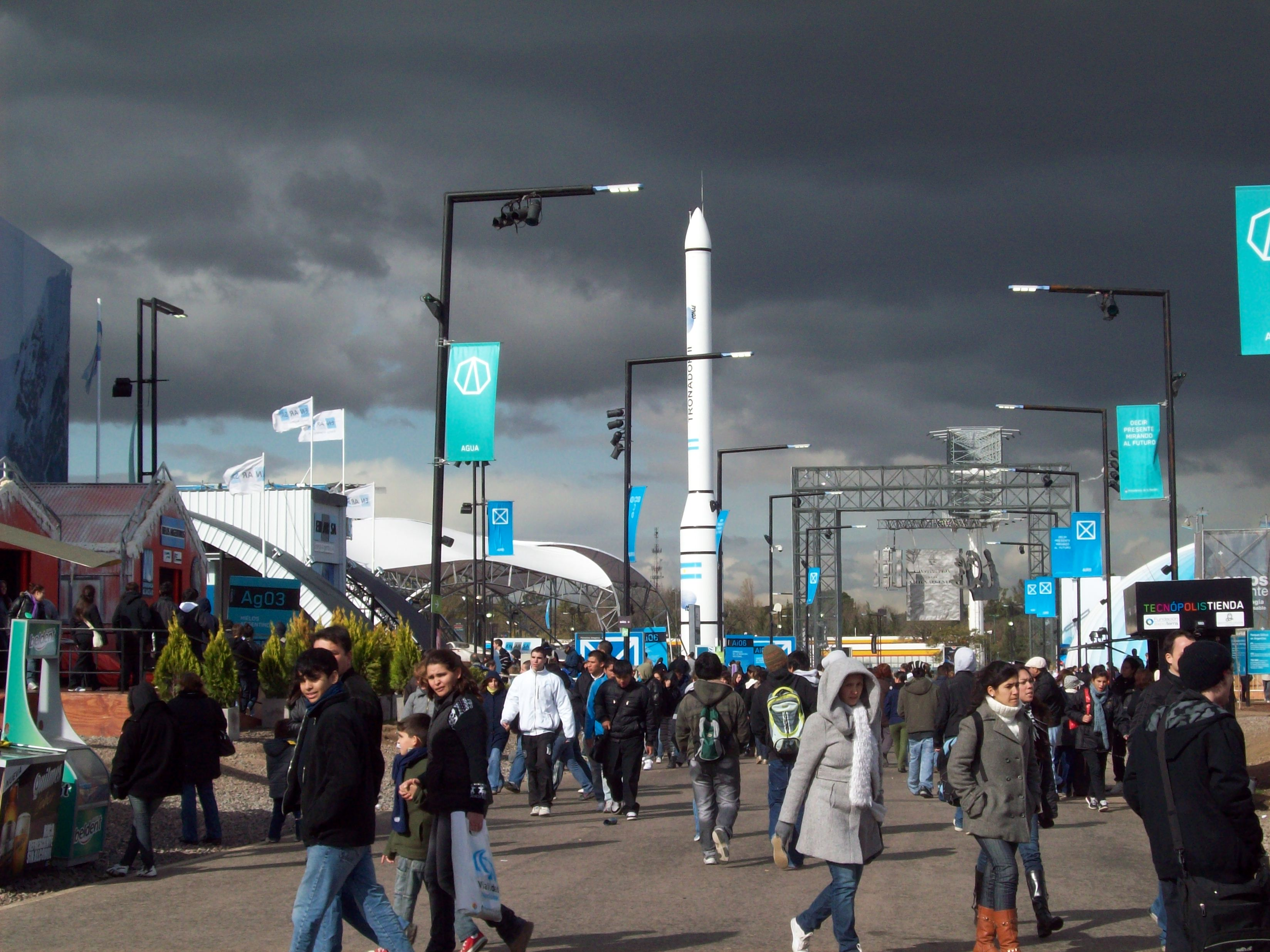

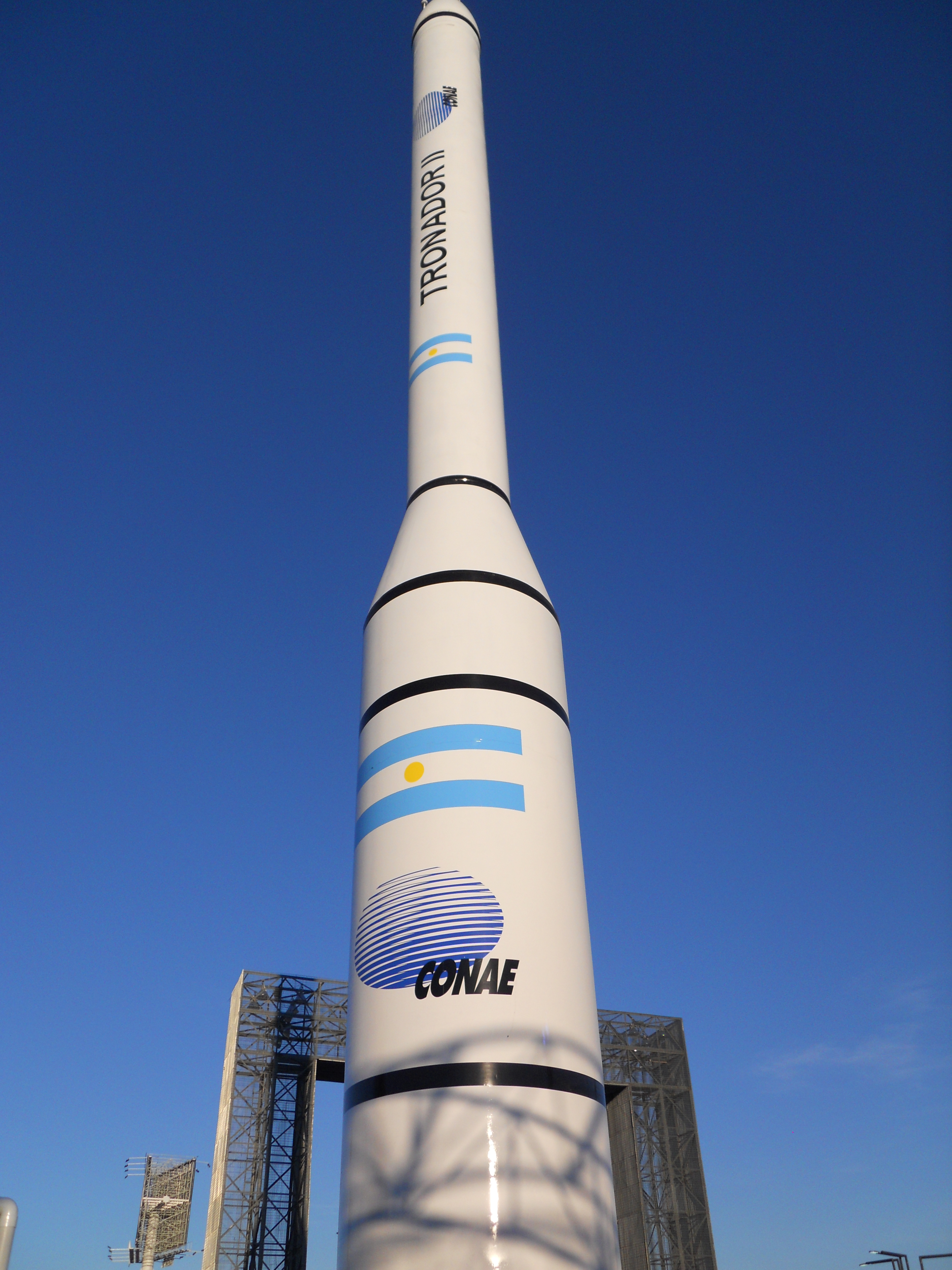

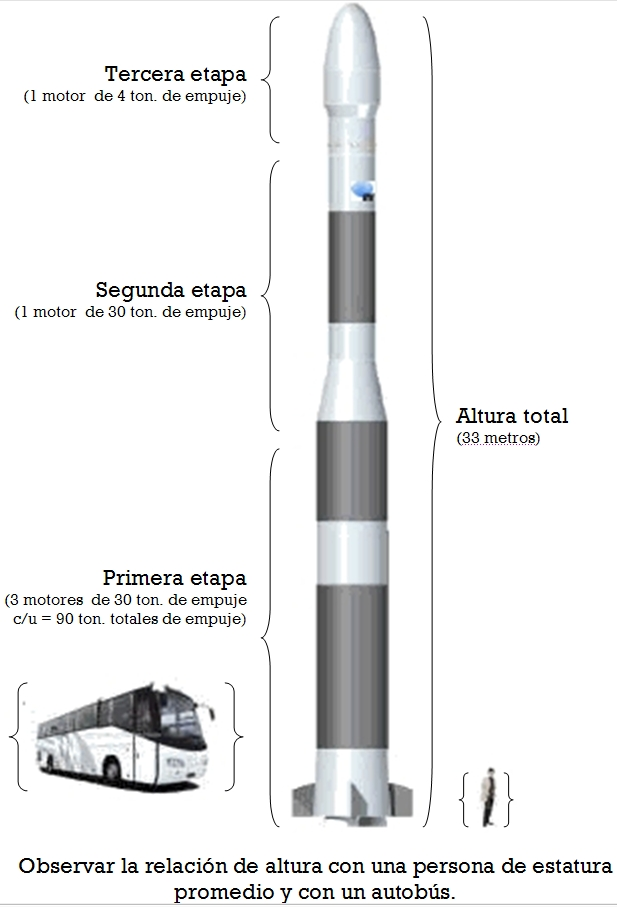

=== Characteristics ===
As of June 2016, the proposed Tronador II configuration was:

- Length: 27 m
- Stages: 2
- Diameter: 2.5 m
- Total weight: 72,000 kg
- Payload mass: 600 kg
- Apogee: 600 km
- Lower Stage: 90 t total thrust (3x30 t engines) at sea level. Fuel: RP-1 / LOX
- Upper stage: 1.4 t to 4 t thrust (single pressurized engine) at sea level (2 t to 5.5 t in vacuum). Fuel: Monomethylhydrazine (MMH) / N_{2}O_{4}
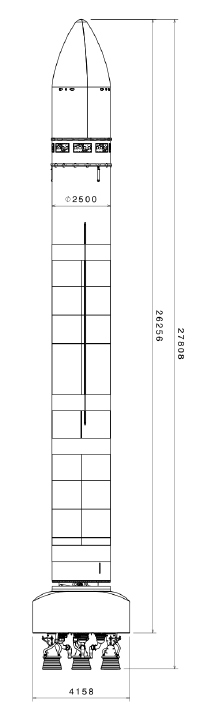
Tronador II dimensions

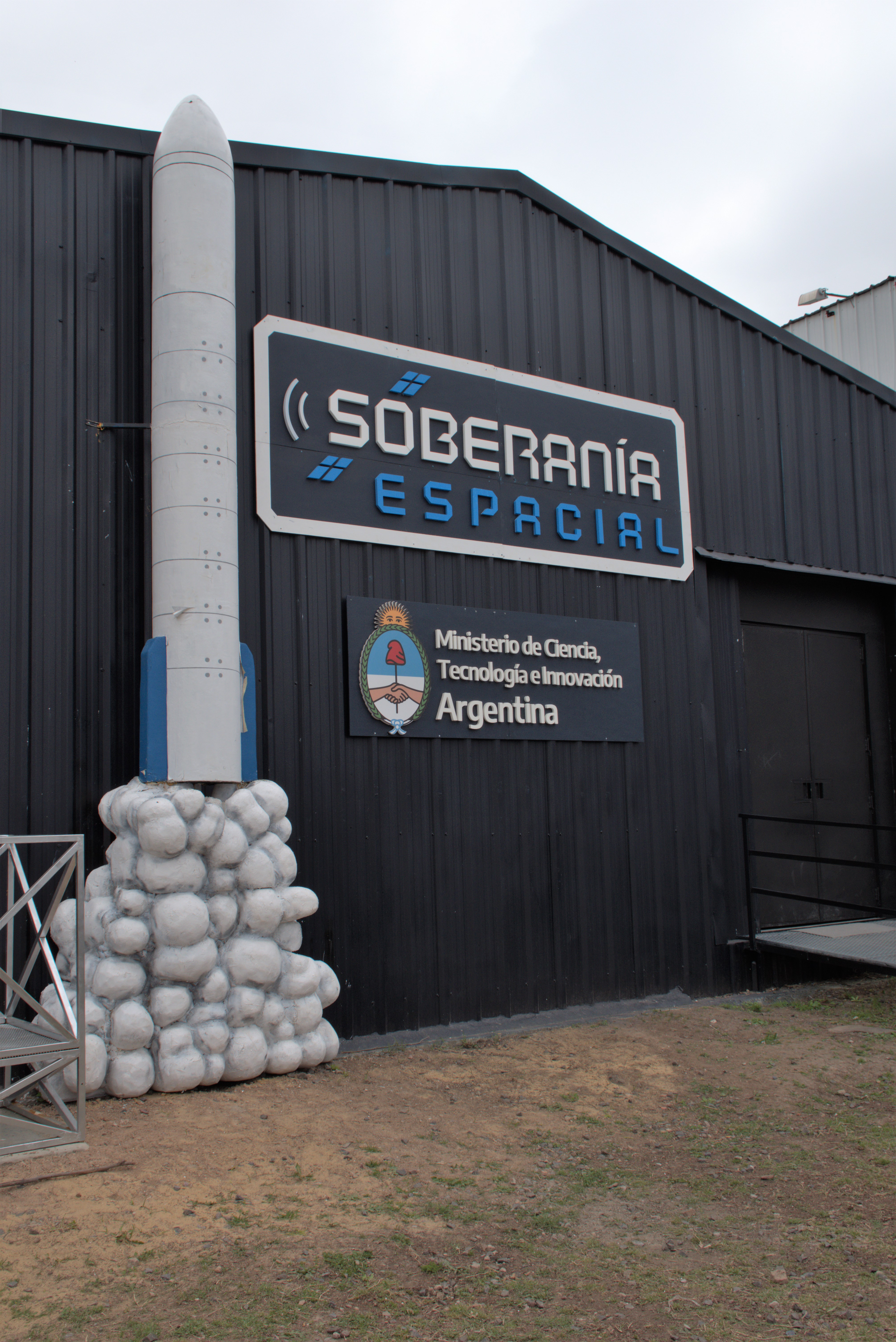
Tronador II mockup

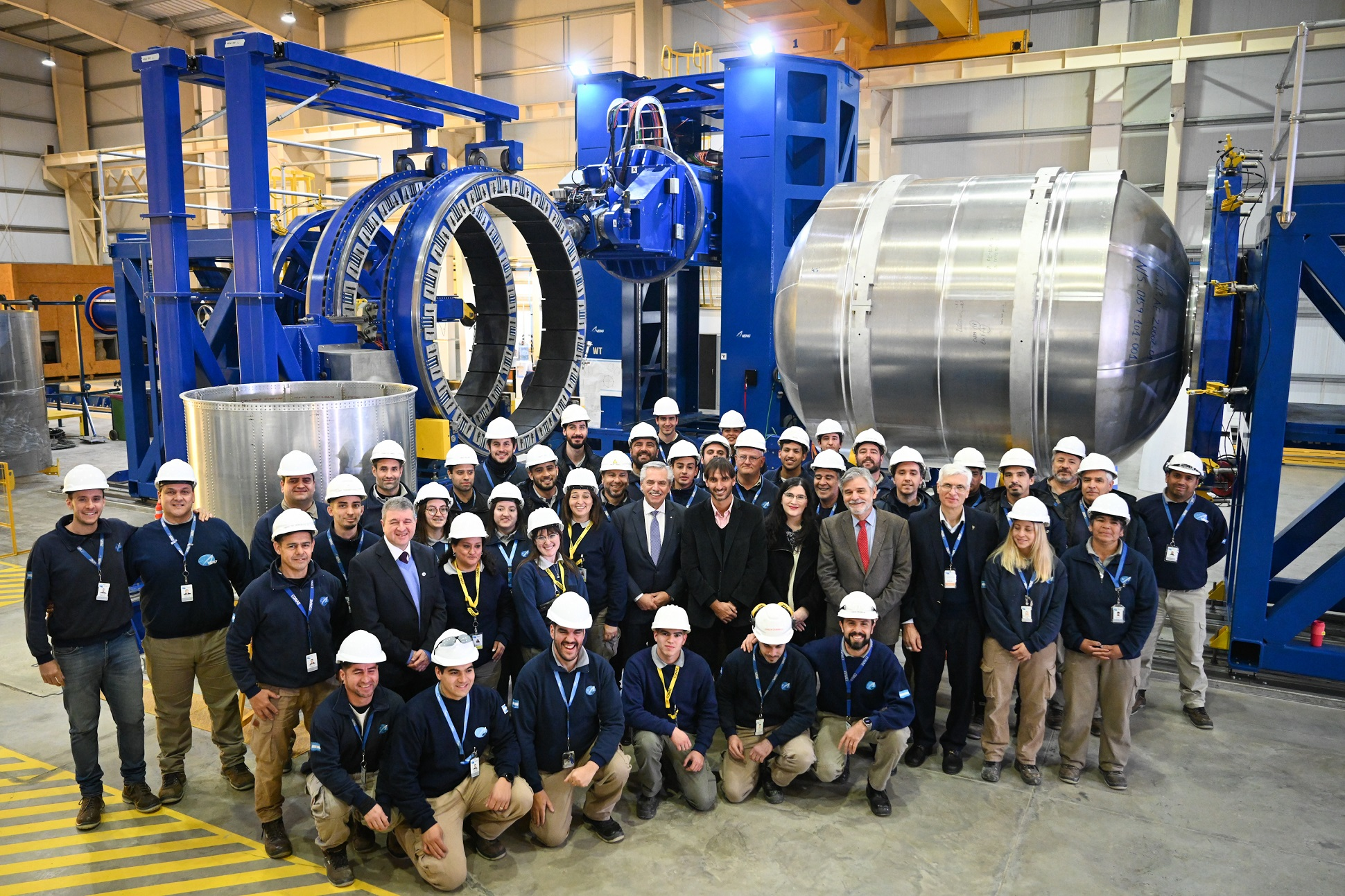
First stage tank of the Tronador rocket

=== TII-250 ===
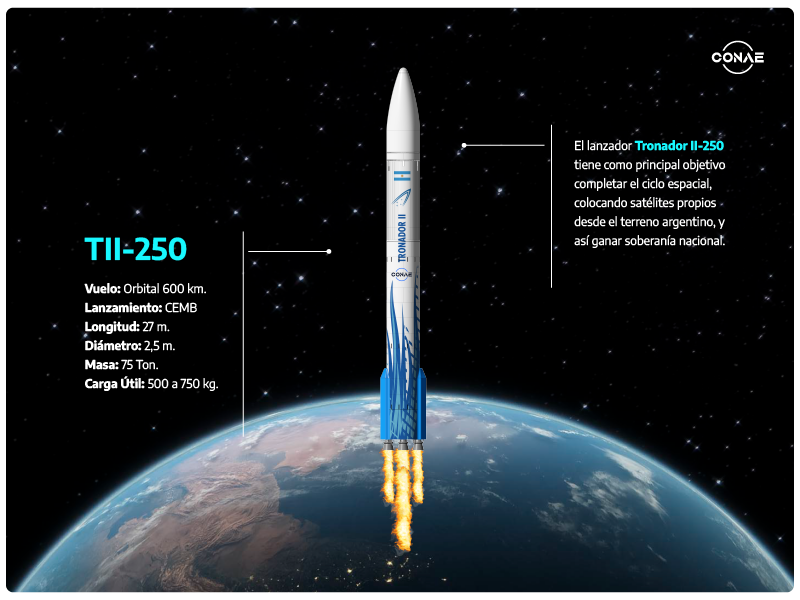
Infographic of the Tronador II-250 rocket

In late 2022 Tronador II was named TII-250, with the launch site being indicated as Centro Espacial Manuel Belgrano (CEMB), in Bahía Blanca.

=== Tronador II prototypes ===
==== T4000 ====
The T4000 (Tronador T4000 pathfinder rocket) test rocket is related to the project, as it is the basis of the 3rd stage of the Tronador II. Specifically, it was intended to house the attitude control system (“Thrust Vector Control” - TVS). The first launch attempt in 2011 failed.

Characteristics

- Diameter: 4.38 m
- Thrust: 4,000 kg (40 kN)
- Burn time: 10 seconds

==== VEx ====
The recent strategy was to fly separately several suborbital experimental subsystems, called "VEx", before they are incorporated in the prototype of the Tronador II rocket. After a few launches, it was decided in 2017 to stop the experimental VEx series as enough data was obtained to go ahead with a prototype rocket. However, in November 2021, it was announced that the program were reactivated again.

===== VEx-1A =====
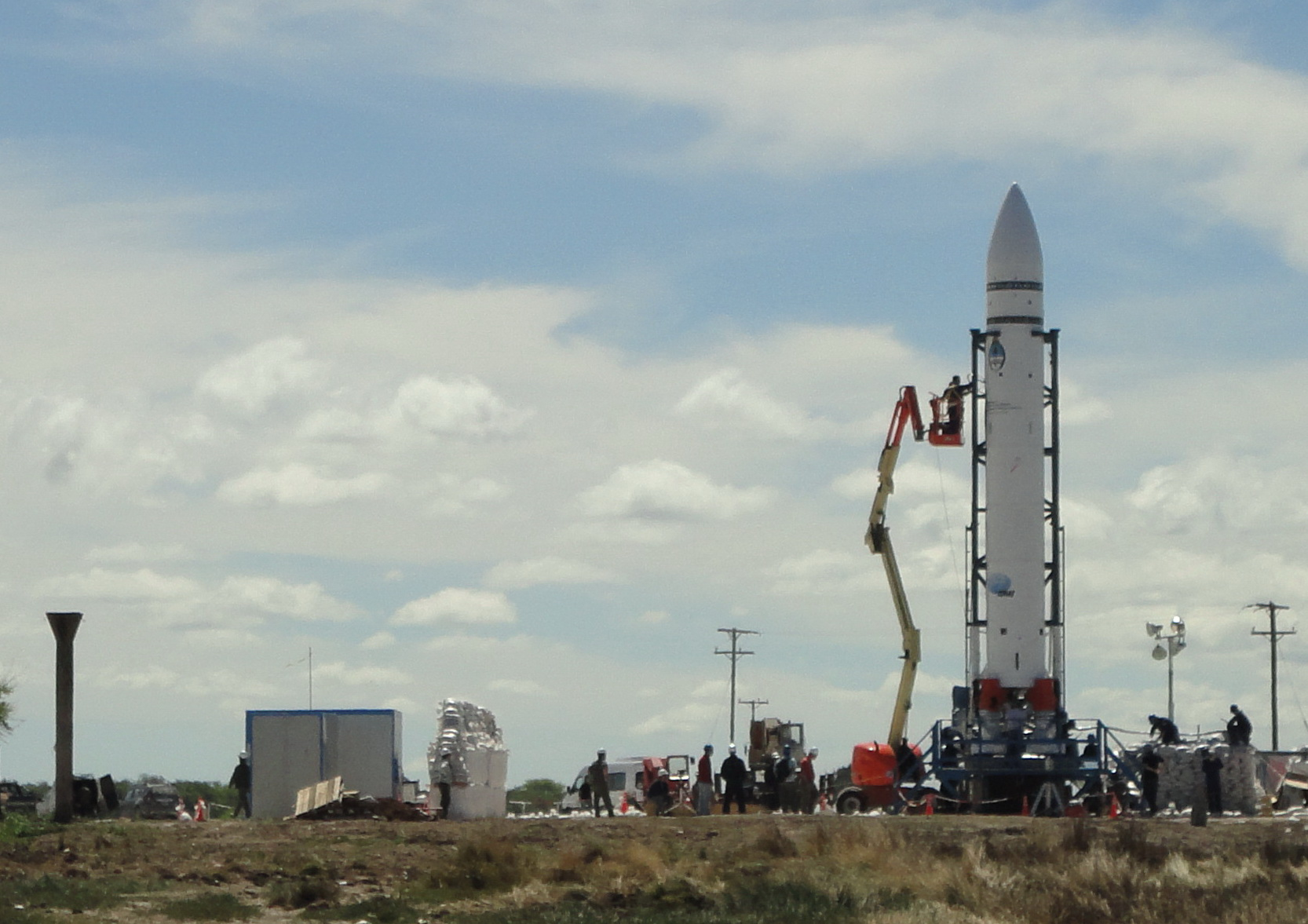
VEx-1A at its launch pad, Punta Indio Spaceport

In March 2014, a suborbital prototype named VEx-1A failed during launch from Pipinas, Punta Indio Partido. It had only one stage, weigh 2.8 tonnes, thrust of 4 ton, with an expectation of 60 seconds mission duration and expected apogee of 2 km. VEx-1A first launch attempt was postponed in December 2013 due to ground support equipment fail. The second attempt failed on February 26, 2014. It was discovered that the failure was caused by interferences between the launch pad and the rocket, which prevented the vehicle from elevating more than 2m off the ground. The engine control mechanism shut off the fuel valve, preventing an explosion, and the rocket fell down next to the pad.

===== VEx-1B =====
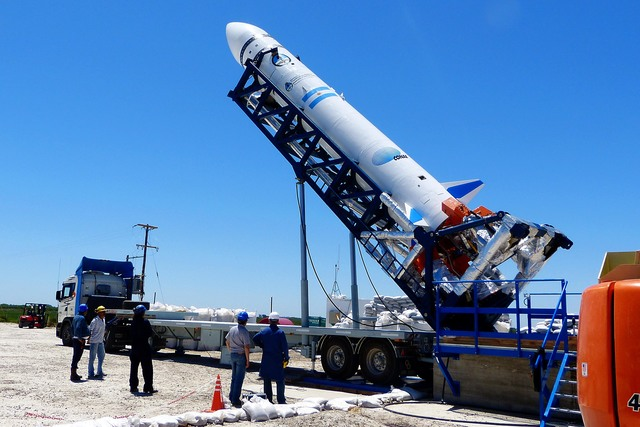
VEx-1b being rolled to its launch pad at the Punta Indio Space Center.

The first flight of this suborbital vehicle was on 15 August 2014 from Pipinas, Punta Indio Partido. It successfully tested propulsion, control, and navigation subsystems. The mission concluded with 2,200 m apogee altitude and 27 seconds flight time. It landed in the sea assisted by the recovery parachutes. The vehicle was recovered and examined to determine whether further VEx-1 test rockets are required or if a VEx-2 flight should proceed.

===== VEx-5A =====
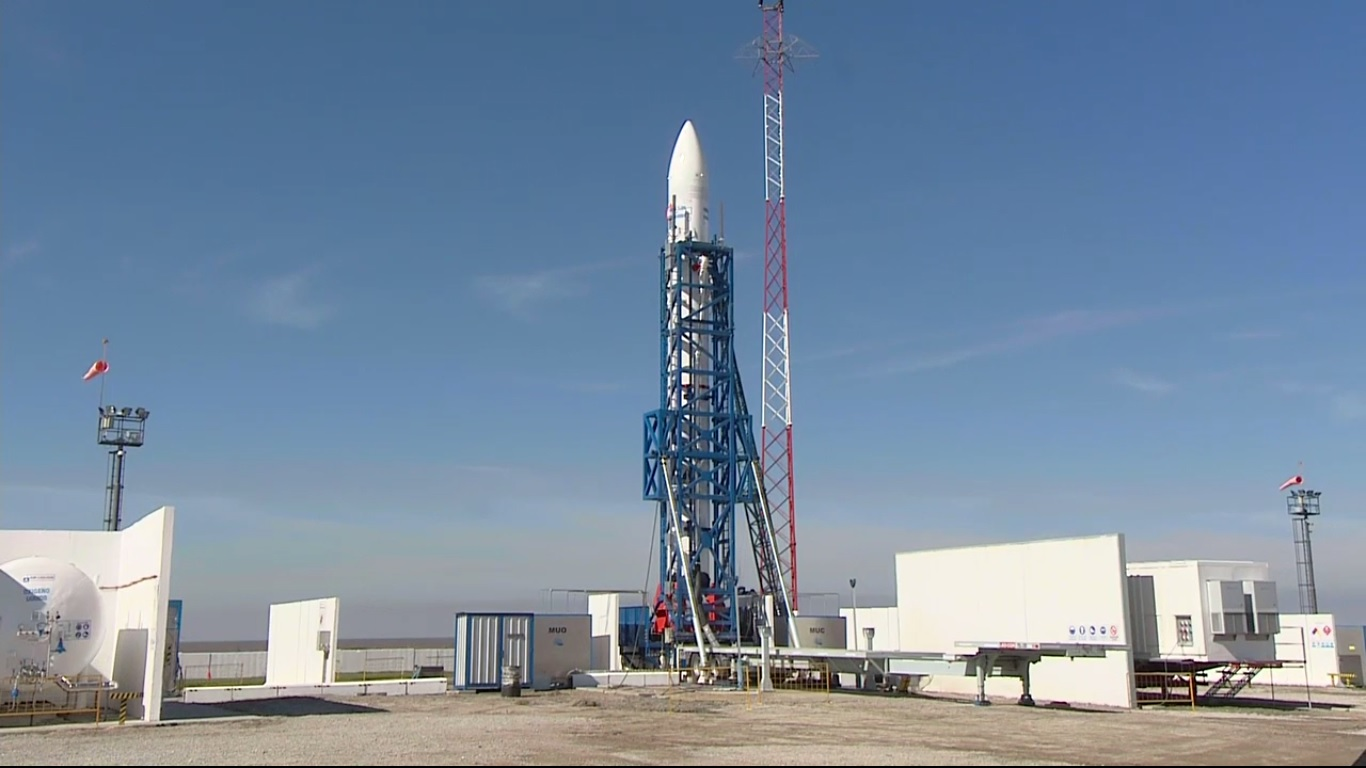
The prototype of the Tronador II rocket, VEX-5A in its launch complex.

VEx-5A was a two-stage suborbital rocket that was destroyed upon launch. The T-10 first stage is capable of producing 11t of thrust, while the T-4 second stage is capable of 4t of thrust. The rocket was 18 meters long and 1.5 meters diameter, with a total launch weight (including fuel) of 8500 kg. The rocket would have separated from the first stage (the propellants are liquid oxygen / RP-1) at 15 km altitude and the second stage would have continued, reaching up to 30 km altitude using hydrazine / nitric acid. The vehicle would have tested several technologies, new fuels, and for the first time, the interstage separation (mechanical and automatic aspects), and the ignition of the second stage. The rocket was completed in mid 2015 and scheduled to launch in October 2015, but postponed to November 2016, before postponed again. The test flight finally occurred on 21 April 2017, 18:00 local time from Pipinas, Punta Indio Partido. The rocket climbed up from its pad, but eight seconds later the first stage rocket engine shut down due to abrupt flow in its fuel lines. Several seconds later, the rocket fell and impacted the launch pad, causing a fiery explosion. The ill-fated launch was announced officially by CONAE several hours after the launch and footage from several angles were made available.

===== VEx-5B =====
Test flight - single stage 30t thrust engine rocket - it was projected for a 2018 launch from Pipinas, Punta Indio Partido. The mission was cancelled in 2017, before were announced in November 2021 that the mission were reactivated again.

===== VEx-5C =====
Test flight - two stage test rocket. First stage 30t thrust engine, second stage VEx-1 engine - it was projected for a 2019 launch from Puerto Belgrano Naval Base. The mission was cancelled in 2017, before were announced in November 2021 that the mission were reactivated again.

===== VEx-6 =====
Test flight of the rocket. Investment of approximately $45 million in the Tronador SLV program was announced in 2022, including associated experimental rockets VEx-5 and VEx-6.

==== TII-70 and TII-150 ====
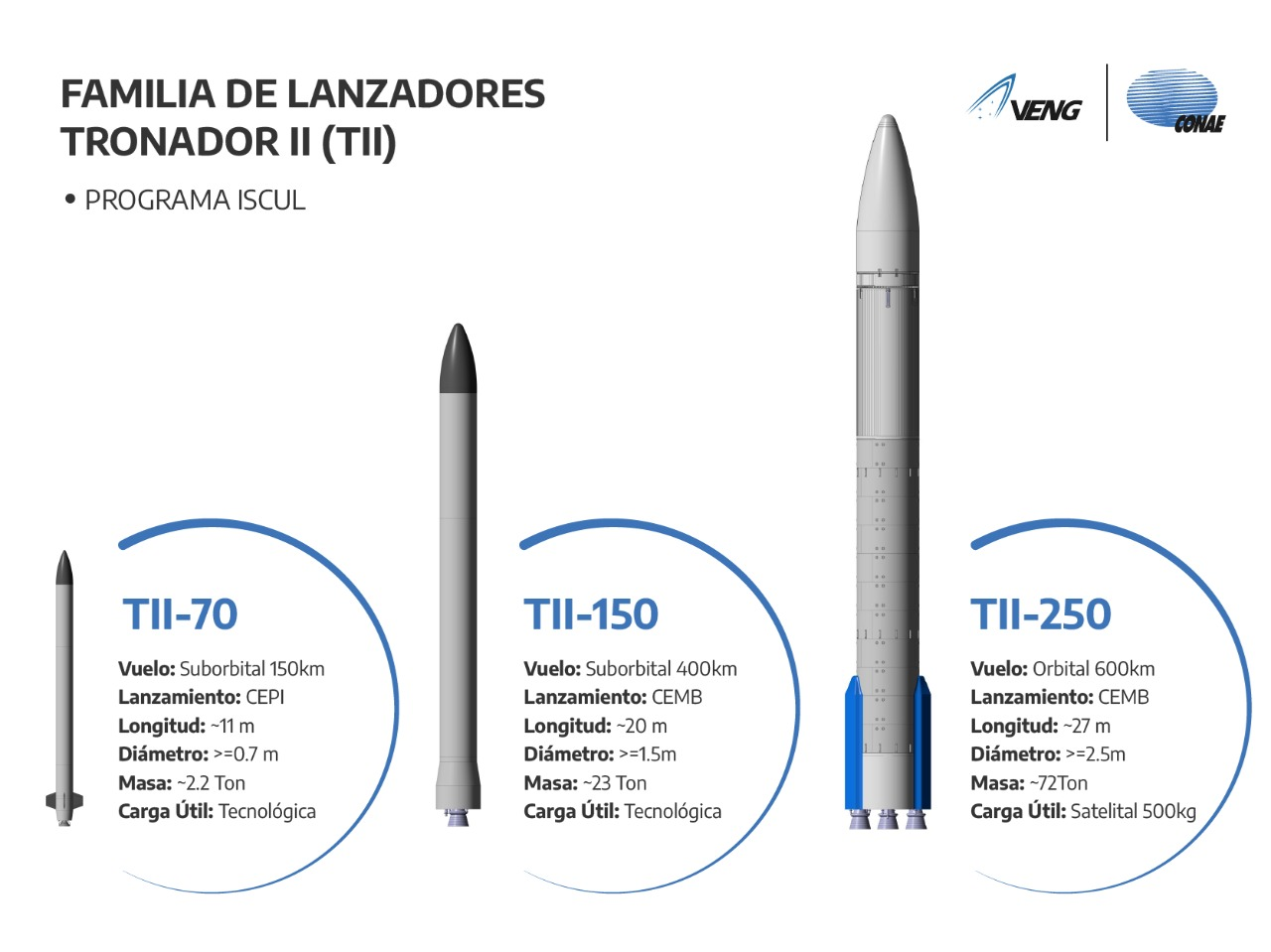
Tronador II family with TII-70 and TII-150 prototypes

In late 2022, two Tronador II prototypes, with the goal of engine testing were announced:

- TII-70 (150 km apogee, 11 m length, 2.2 ton weight, launched from Punta Indio Space Center - CEPI)
- TII-150 (400 km apogee, 20 m length, 23 ton weight, launched from Centro Espacial Manuel Belgrano - CEMB)

== Tronador III ==
The proposed Tronador III would have the same diameter as Tronador II, but would have a length of 34 metres (112 ft). The fueled rocket would weight 90 metric tons, and capable of delivering satellites with up to 750 kg to a 600 km orbit, or up to a ton if upper stages are used.

=== Characteristics ===
Proposed Tronador III configuration:

- Length: 35 m
- Stages: 2
- Diameter: 2.5 m
- Empty mass: 6,600 kg
- Total weight: 90,000 kg
- Payload mass: 1000 kg
- Apogee: 600 km
- Lower Stage: 120t total thrust (4 × 30t engines) at sea level. Fuel: RP-1/LOX
- Upper stage: 3t thrust (single engine). Fuel: MMH/NTO

=== VLE (Vehículo Lanzador Espacial) ===
Tronador III will be preceded by the VLE (Vehículo Lanzador Espacial for Space Launch Vehicle) capable of placing an 80 kg payload on a 300 km orbit. This would be a two stage rocket, with the first stage using 5 or more Karut engines with 2.5 t of thrust and burning RP-1/LOX.

== See also ==
- List of rockets
- Comparison of orbital launch systems
