= Magdalena Town Hall =

- Palacio Municipal de Magdalena
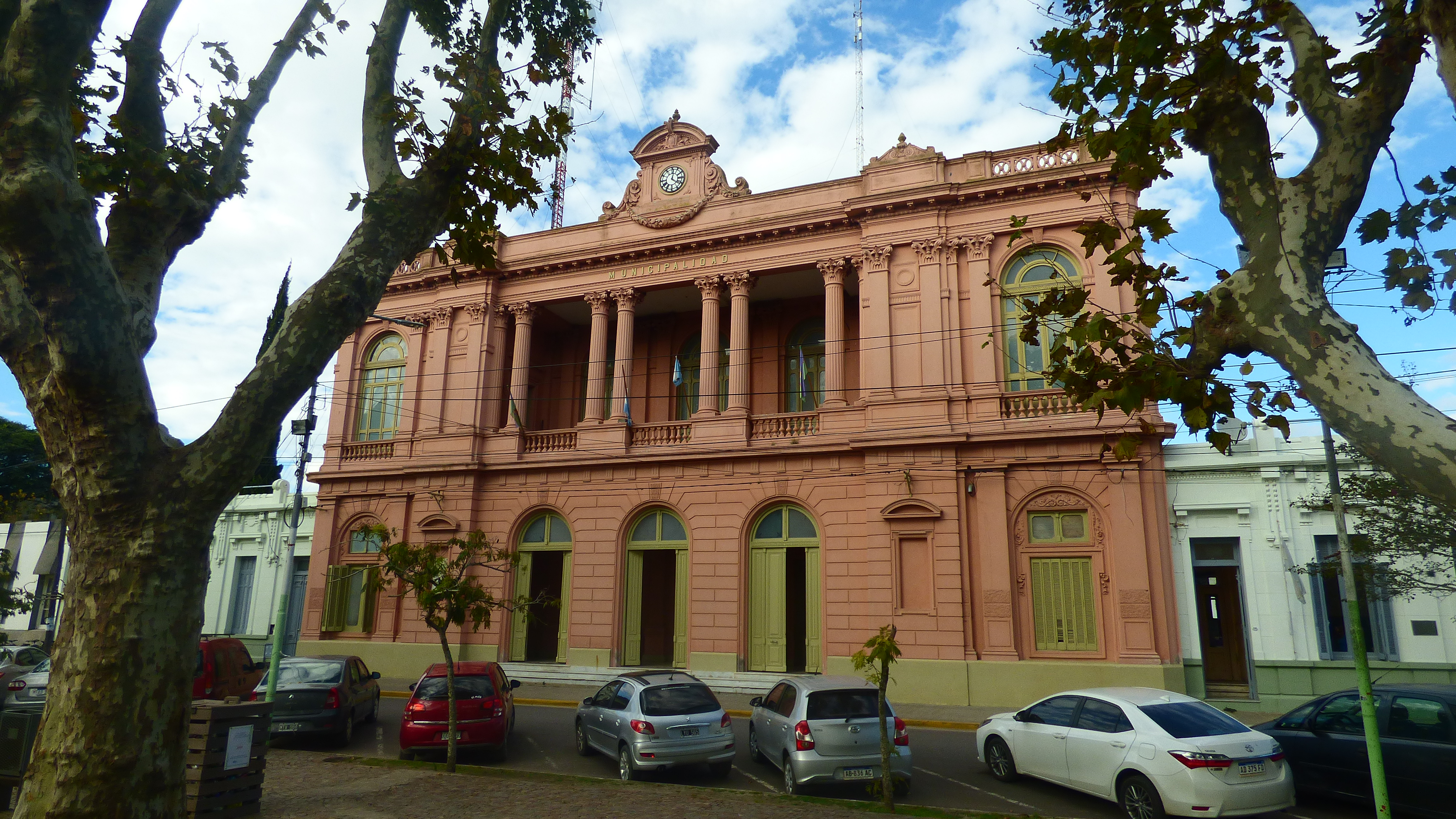
- Magdalena Town Hall in 2025
- Click on the map for a fullscreen view

General information
- Location: Magdalena, Argentina
- Coordinates: 35°04′52.51″S 57°31′04.43″W

Magdalena Town Hall (Spanish: Palacio Municipal de Magdalena) is a historic town hall located in Magdalena, Argentina. It houses the municipal government of the Magdalena Partido.

== History ==
The first municipal building in Magdalena was erected in 1856 at the intersection of the streets then known as Obligado and Pintos, now Brenan and Yrigoyen. In 1877, the construction of the current building was approved. Designed by architect Pedro Cavalli, it replaced the original town hall and was officially inaugurated in 1897.

== Description ==
The building stands on Plaza San Martín in the town centre of Magdalena. It features Italianate architecture and a symmetrical façade centered on a loggia. The structure has two storeys: the ground floor houses the municipal administrative offices, while the upper floor houses the council and reception hall, which was historically used for celebrations and social events. The building also preserves some of its original furnishings, including late 19th-century Louis XVI-style chairs.
