= Atalaia =

Atalaia may refer to:

== Places ==
=== Brazil ===
- Atalaia, Alagoas, a municipality in the State of Alagoas
- Atalaia Nova, a beach in the municipality of Barra dos Coqueiros, State of Sergipe
- Atalaia Velha, a beach in the municipality of Aracaju, State of Sergipe

=== Portugal ===
- Atalaia (Gavião), a parish in the municipality of Gavião
- Atalaia (Lourinhã), a parish in the municipality of Lourinhã
- Atalaia (Montijo), a former parish in the municipality of Montijo
- Atalaia (Pinhel), a parish in the municipality of Pinhel
- Atalaia (Vila Nova da Barquinha), a parish in the municipality of Vila Nova da Barquinha

== Other ==
- Atalaia, Cape Verde, a village on the island of Fogo
- Pico da Atalaia, a small peak on Selvagem Grande in the Savage Islands
- Castle of Atalaia
- Church of Atalaia

== See also ==
- Atalaya (disambiguation)
