= Verónica, Buenos Aires =

Verónica
- Location in Argentina
- Coordinates: 35°23′S 57°20′W
- Country: Argentina
- Province: Buenos Aires
- Partido: Punta Indio
- Founded: 1915
- Elevation: 23 m (75 ft)

Population (2022 census [INDEC])
  - Total: 8,541
- CPA Base: B 1917
- Area code: +54 2221

Verónica is a town and localidad in Buenos Aires Province, in Argentina. It is the administrative centre for the county (partido) of Punta Indio.

== History ==
The town was created on 18 March 1915 on land donated by Martín Tornquist, and named after his wife, Verónica Bernal.

A year before, on 1 January 1914, the railroad from the city of La Plata had arrived at Verónica, and a station was built.

In 1925 the Punta Indio Naval Air Base was established, 6 km (3.7 mi) from the downtown core. It became one of the pillars for the development of the town until today.

== Demographics ==
From the beginning, the town showed a diversity in people's origins. Besides the traditional Spanish-Italian population, a large number of immigrants from Germany, Central and Eastern Europe (Poland, Ukraine and Croatia among others) established themselves in the area. Today, a German Boarding School (Escuela Hogar de Verónica) serves as a retreat for German schools from all over the country. The town stood in for an Uruguayan town in the American film The City of Your Final Destination released in 2009.

== Economy ==
The main activities in the town are related to farming: agriculture, cattle and bird raising. More recently tourism started to develop around the old estancias in the area.

== Sports ==
There are two major sports clubs in Verónica: Club Social y Deportivo Verónica (stablished in 1919) and Club Social y Deportivo Juventud Unida(established in 1951). They compete in regional football tournaments of Liga Costera del Rio de La Plata. Starting in 1991 until 2001, a Turismo Carretera race was held at the Naval Base 6 times.

== Transportation ==
Although the train link has been non-operational for many years, the building of the train station is still operational, although nowadays it is used for cultural associations. A regular bus service is established between Verónica and La Plata, provided by Expreso La Plata. There are also mini-buses that connect with both La Plata and Buenos Aires. Local transport circulates within the town, and connects Verónica with Punta Indio and Pipinas.

== Climate ==
Climate data for Verónica, Buenos Aires (Punta Indio Naval Air Base) 1991–2020, extremes 1961–present
Month	Jan	Feb	Mar	Apr	May	Jun	Jul	Aug	Sep	Oct	Nov	Dec	Year
Record high °C (°F)	43.1 (109.6)	39.1 (102.4)	37.2 (99.0)	32.4 (90.3)	28.8 (83.8)	24.9 (76.8)	28.3 (82.9)	30.0 (86.0)	30.0 (86.0)	34.6 (94.3)	36.8 (98.2)	39.8 (103.6)	43.1 (109.6)
Mean daily maximum °C (°F)	27.9 (82.2)	27.0 (80.6)	25.2 (77.4)	21.7 (71.1)	18.0 (64.4)	14.8 (58.6)	13.7 (56.7)	15.8 (60.4)	17.5 (63.5)	20.5 (68.9)	23.5 (74.3)	26.6 (79.9)	21.0 (69.8)
Daily mean °C (°F)	23.0 (73.4)	22.2 (72.0)	20.4 (68.7)	16.7 (62.1)	13.2 (55.8)	10.2 (50.4)	9.2 (48.6)	10.8 (51.4)	12.8 (55.0)	15.9 (60.6)	18.7 (65.7)	21.4 (70.5)	16.2 (61.2)
Mean daily minimum °C (°F)	18.3 (64.9)	17.6 (63.7)	16.0 (60.8)	12.4 (54.3)	9.3 (48.7)	6.3 (43.3)	5.4 (41.7)	6.6 (43.9)	8.5 (47.3)	11.5 (52.7)	14.0 (57.2)	16.5 (61.7)	11.9 (53.4)
Record low °C (°F)	5.5 (41.9)	4.0 (39.2)	0.6 (33.1)	0.2 (32.4)	−2.0 (28.4)	−7.5 (18.5)	−4.6 (23.7)	−4.1 (24.6)	−2.6 (27.3)	−0.6 (30.9)	2.0 (35.6)	3.5 (38.3)	−7.5 (18.5)
Average precipitation mm (inches)	97.4 (3.83)	116.1 (4.57)	94.8 (3.73)	93.8 (3.69)	67.5 (2.66)	69.3 (2.73)	82.5 (3.25)	68.9 (2.71)	77.2 (3.04)	95.9 (3.78)	94.8 (3.73)	82.3 (3.24)	1,040.5 (40.96)
Average precipitation days (≥ 0.1 mm)	6.4	7.2	7.0	7.3	6.1	5.6	6.5	6.2	6.7	7.9	6.9	6.7	80.5
Average snowy days	0.0	0.0	0.0	0.0	0.0	0.0	0.1	0.0	0.0	0.0	0.0	0.0	0.1
Average relative humidity (%)	76.4	79.6	81.7	84.3	86.6	86.8	86.3	84.3	82.6	81.6	78.4	75.3	82.0
Mean monthly sunshine hours	291.4	234.8	220.1	183.0	161.2	138.0	145.7	170.5	177.0	210.8	255.0	288.3	2,475.8
Mean daily sunshine hours	9.4	8.3	7.1	6.1	5.2	4.6	4.7	5.5	5.9	6.8	8.5	9.3	6.8
Percentage possible sunshine	65	63	60	60	55	46	46	52	51	54	60	60	56
Source 1: Servicio Meteorológico Nacional
Source 2: NOAA (percent sun 1961–1990)

== Notable people ==
- Reposo, Daniel Gustavo, Argentine lawyer and politician
