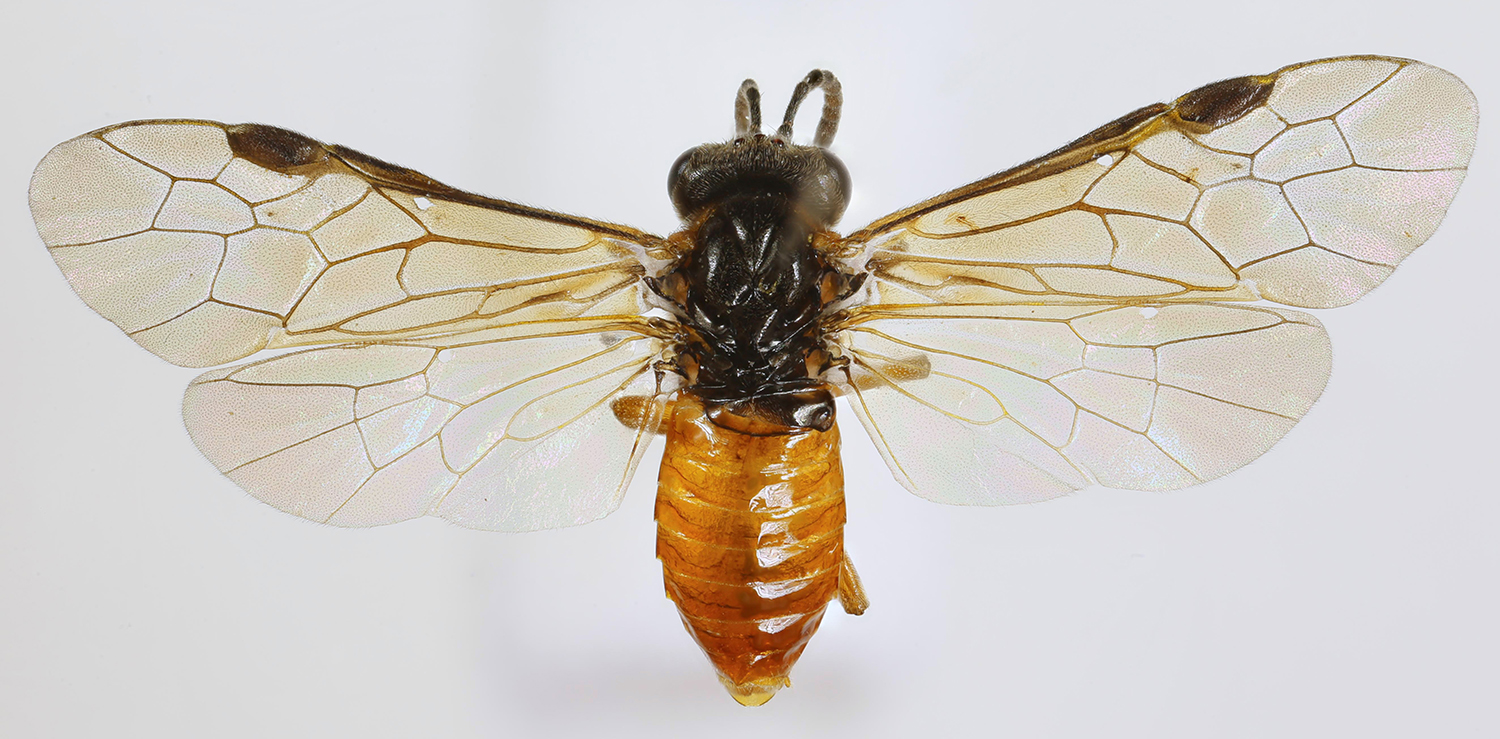
- Athalia lugens, North Wales

Scientific classification
- Domain: Eukaryota
- Kingdom: Animalia
- Phylum: Arthropoda
- Class: Insecta
- Order: Hymenoptera
- Suborder: Symphyta
- Family: Tenthredinidae
- Genus: Athalia
- Species: A. lugens

Binomial name
- Athalia lugens (Klug, 1813)

= Athalia lugens =

Species of sawfly

Athalia lugens is a Palearctic species of sawfly.
