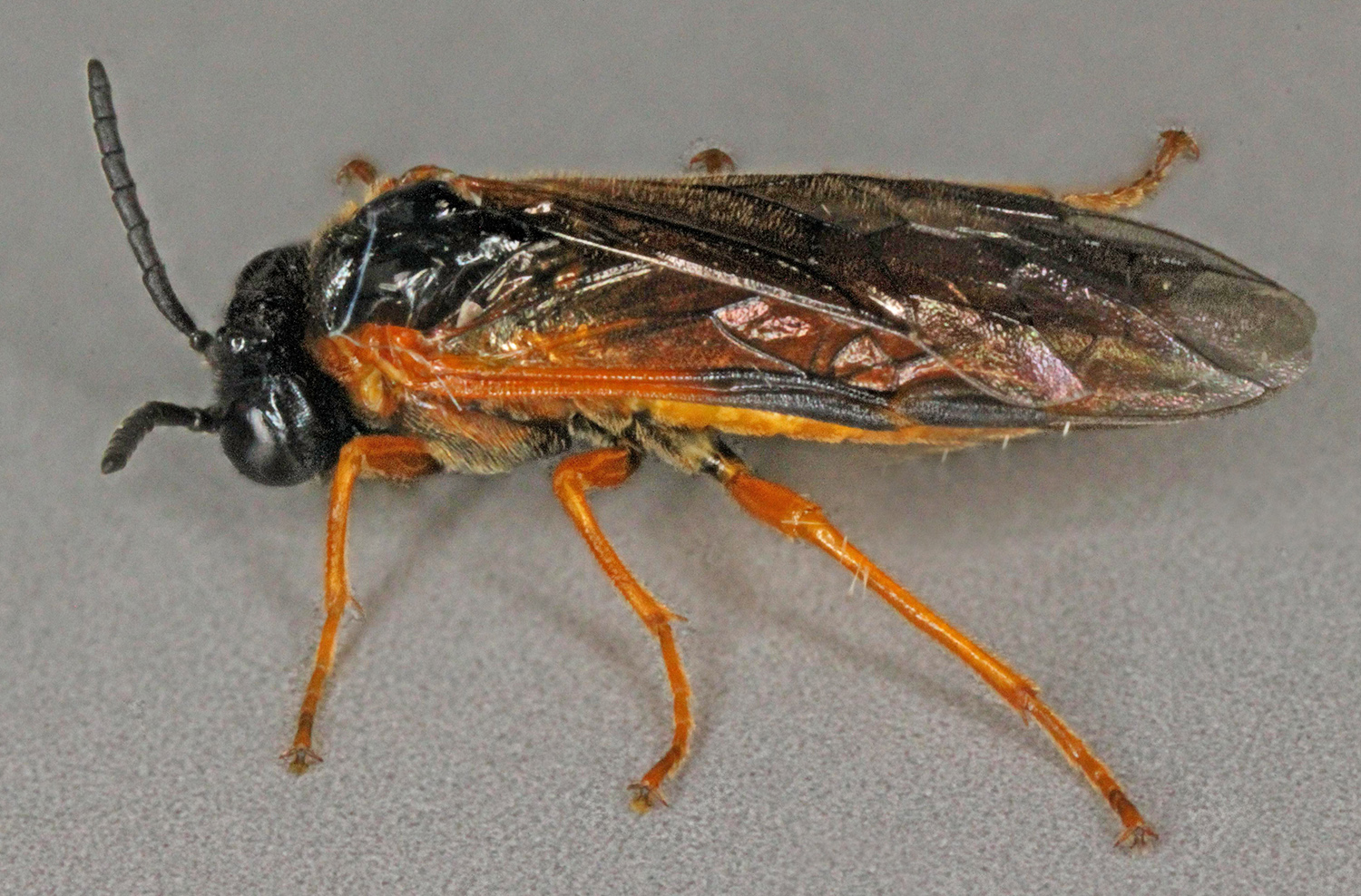
- Athalia scutellariae, Dinlle saltmarsh, North Wales

Scientific classification
- Domain: Eukaryota
- Kingdom: Animalia
- Phylum: Arthropoda
- Class: Insecta
- Order: Hymenoptera
- Suborder: Symphyta
- Family: Tenthredinidae
- Genus: Athalia
- Species: A. scutellariae

Binomial name
- Athalia scutellariae Cameron, 1880

= Athalia scutellariae =

Species of sawfly

Athalia scutellariae is a Palearctic species of sawfly.
