= Punta Indio Naval Air Base =

Airport in Argentina

Punta Indio Naval Air Base Base Aeronaval Punta Indio
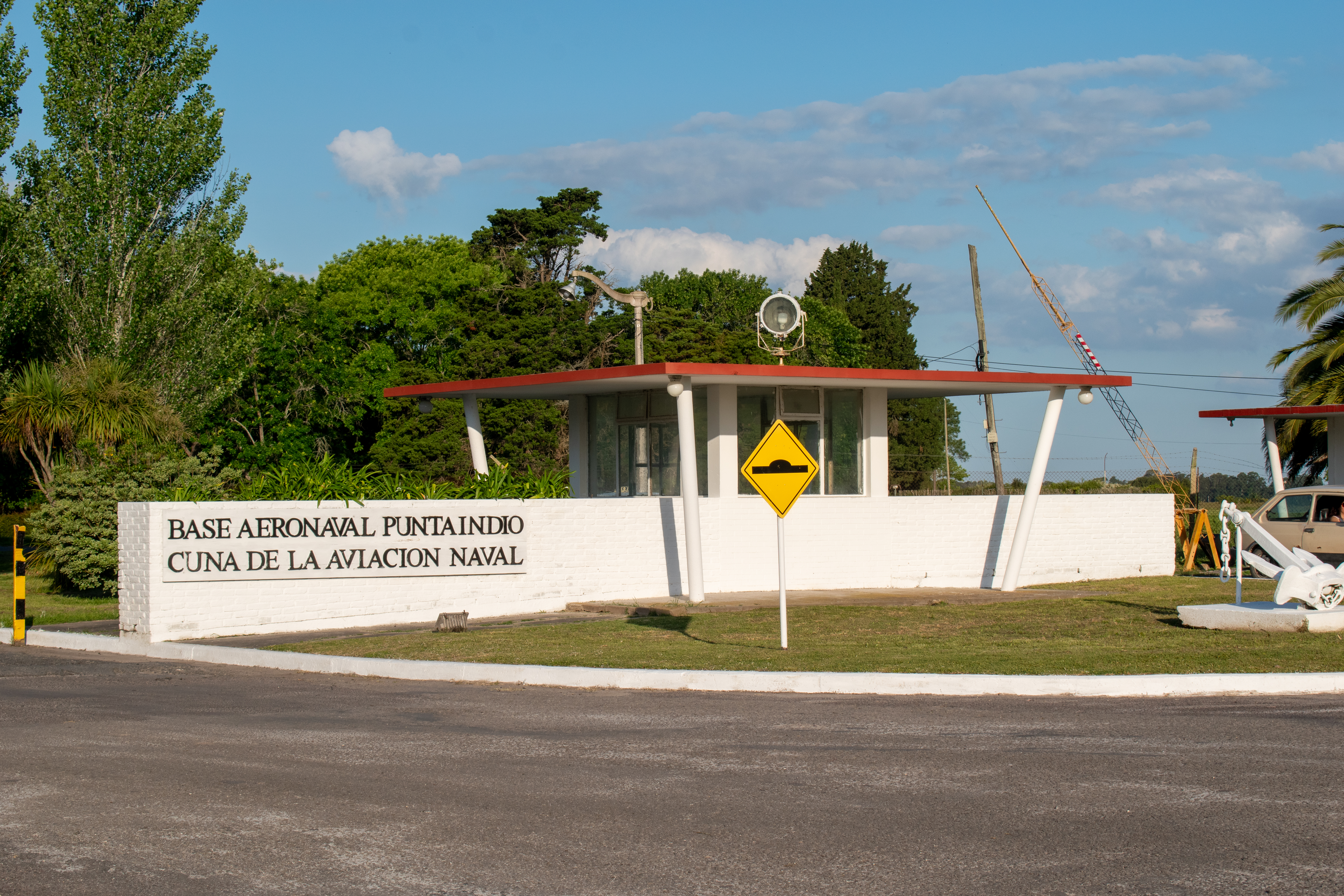
- Main entrance to the base
- IATA: none; ICAO: SAAI

Summary
- Airport type: Military
- Serves: Punta Indio, Argentina
- Elevation AMSL: 52 ft / 16 m
- Coordinates: 35°20′52″S 57°17′40″W

Map
- Location of Air Base in Argentina

Runways
Direction	Length		Surface
Direction	m	ft	Surface
06/24	2,121	6,959	Asphalt
07/25	1,400	4,593	Asphalt
12/30	1,195	3,921	Asphalt
- Source: Landings.com Google Maps GCM

Punta Indio Naval Air Base (Spanish: Base Aeronaval Punta Indio, ICAO: SAAI) is a military airport operated by the Argentine Naval Aviation, located in the countryside 5 kilometres (3 mi) northeast of Verónica, a town in the Buenos Aires Province of Argentina.

The Punta Indio VOR-DME (Ident: PDI) and non-directional beacon (Ident: PDI) are located on the field.

== History ==
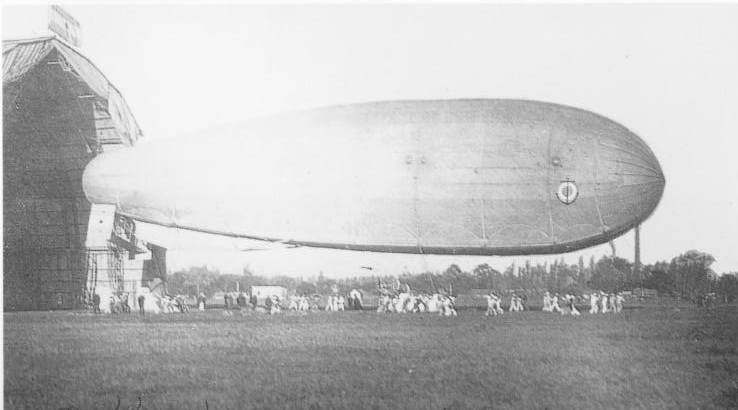
El Plata (DE-1 / O-1) at its moorings, Punta Indio, 1928

Punta Indio Naval Air Base (Argentine Navy identifier: BAPI), the cradle of Argentine Naval Aviation, was established in 1928 on land that was donated by Martín Tornquist, who founded the nearby city of Verónica. The base was strategically located to control access by ship to the Río de la Plata, initially via manned balloons.

On 16 June 1955, Punta Indio was the departure base of the naval aircraft that bombarded the Casa Rosada attempting to kill president Juan Domingo Perón This action was the preface to the September uprising known as "Revolución Libertadora".

In April 1963, during the Navy uprising (part of the Azules y Colorados confrontation), rebel naval aircraft from Punta Indio attacked the loyalist 8th Tank Regiment; afterwards the air base was attacked by the loyalist Air Force and occupied by the Army.

During the National Reorganization Process, a Clandestine Detention Centre was active at Punta Indio.

In 2008 the First Naval Air Squadron was deactivated due to lack of budget.

In 2011, the 90th anniversary of the foundating of the Naval Aviation School was celebrated.

== Units ==
Punta Indio Naval Air Base is the location of the First Naval Air Force (Spanish: Fuerza Aeronaval N° 1), comprising the following units:

- Punta Indio Naval Air Base group
- Punta Indio Naval Air Workshop (Spanish: Taller Aeronaval Punta Indio)
- First Naval Air Wing (Spanish: Escuadra Aeronaval N° 1), composed of:
  - Argentine Naval Aviation School (Spanish: Escuela de Aviación Naval)
  - First Naval Air Attack Squadron (Spanish: Primera Escuadrilla Aeronaval de Ataque), currently on reserve
  - Naval Air Maritime Patrol Squadron (Spanish: Escuadrilla Aeronaval de Vigilancia Marítima).

== See also ==
- Transport in Argentina
- List of airports in Argentina
