= Adalia =

Adalia may refer to:

== People with the surname ==
- Khryss Adalia (1946–2008), Filipino film director

== Other uses ==
- The ancient name of Antalya, Turkey
- "Adalia" (character), a fictional character in songs by Madina Lake
- Adalia (genus), a genus of ladybirds in the family Coccinellidae
- Adalia, a village in Spain

== See also ==
- Attalia (disambiguation)
