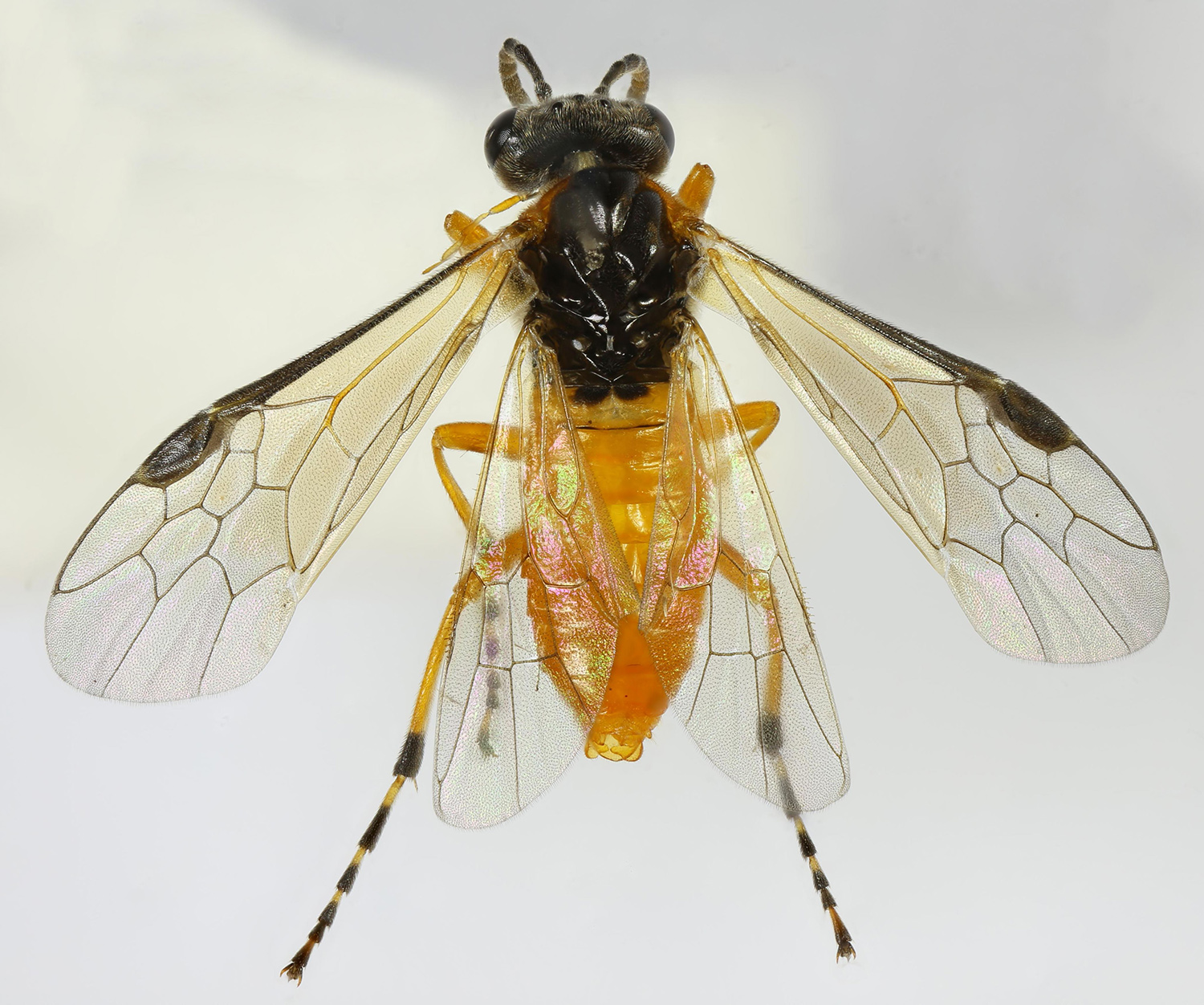
- Athalia circularis , Sontley, North Wales

Scientific classification
- Domain: Eukaryota
- Kingdom: Animalia
- Phylum: Arthropoda
- Class: Insecta
- Order: Hymenoptera
- Suborder: Symphyta
- Family: Tenthredinidae
- Genus: Athalia
- Species: A. circularis

Binomial name
- Athalia circularis (Klug, 1815)

= Athalia circularis =

Species of sawfly

Athalia circularis is a Palearctic species of sawfly.
