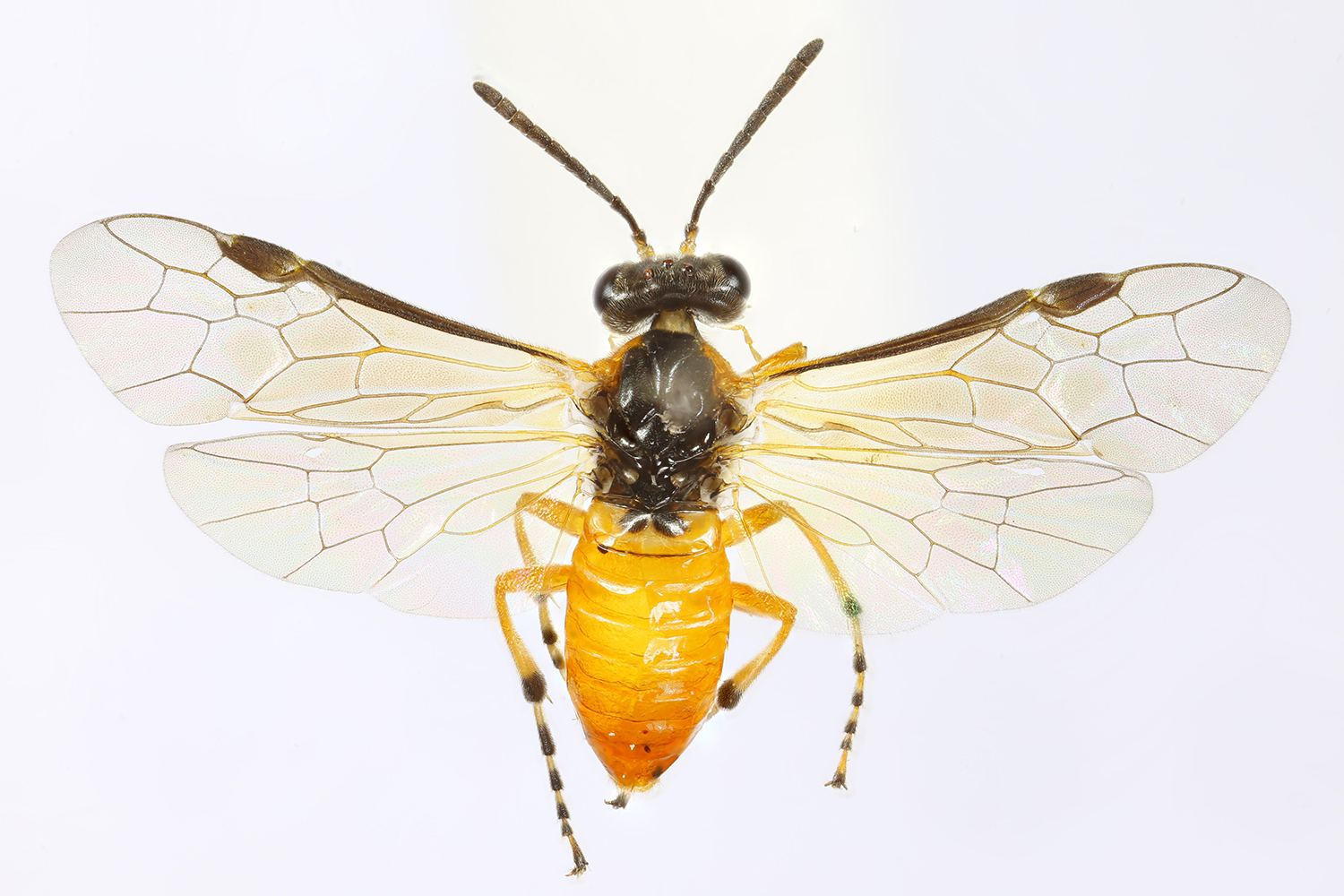
- Athalia cordata, Sontley, North Wales

Scientific classification
- Domain: Eukaryota
- Kingdom: Animalia
- Phylum: Arthropoda
- Class: Insecta
- Order: Hymenoptera
- Suborder: Symphyta
- Family: Tenthredinidae
- Genus: Athalia
- Species: A. cordata

Binomial name
- Athalia cordata Serville, 1823

= Athalia cordata =

Species of sawfly

Athalia cordata is a Palearctic species of sawfly.
