= Atalya =

Atalya may refer to:

- Atalyā, wife of Sargon II
- Atalya Slater, in America's Next Top Model

== See also ==
- Athaliah, queen consort of Judah as the wife of King Jehoram, a descendant of King David, and later queen regnant c. 841–835 BCE
- Attalia (disambiguation)
- Atalaya (disambiguation)
