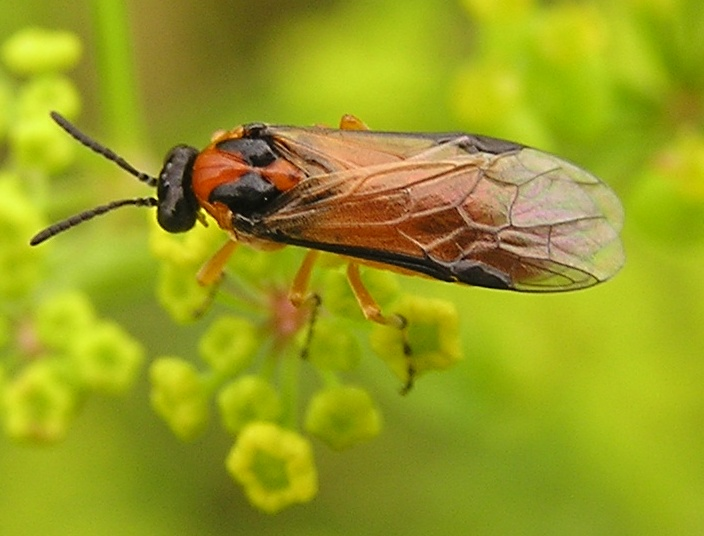

Scientific classification
- Kingdom: Animalia
- Phylum: Arthropoda
- Class: Insecta
- Order: Hymenoptera
- Suborder: Symphyta
- Family: Tenthredinidae
- Genus: Athalia
- Species: A. rosae

Binomial name
- Athalia rosae (Linnaeus, 1758)

= Athalia rosae =

Species of sawfly

Athalia rosae, the turnip sawfly, cabbage leaf sawfly or beet sawfly, is a typical sawfly with dark green or blackish 18–25 mm long larvae that feed on plants of the brassica family, and can sometimes be a pest. It winters below the ground, emerging in early summer as a 7–8 mm adult with a mainly orange body and a black head. The adult feeds on nectar.

The turnip sawfly was found to result in diploid males and females after sister-brother matings. This differs from normal haplodiploid hymenoptera and after a further cross causing triploid males, resulted in evidence that sex determination is controlled by a single locus. The sawflies have been found to sequester glucosinolates like many insects in larval stages. Removal of various glucosinolates has been shown to reduce sensitivity to host plants in later adult stages. The fact that glucosinolates being removed causes reduced sensitivity to future possible host plants has been used to argue that these chemicals are important in specific larval patterning to future host plant options. Due to no current primitive Hymenoptera, the turnip sawfly is being worked on for genome sequencing. This effort will add to the planned i5K, the effort to sequence 5,000 insect genomes in 5 years.
