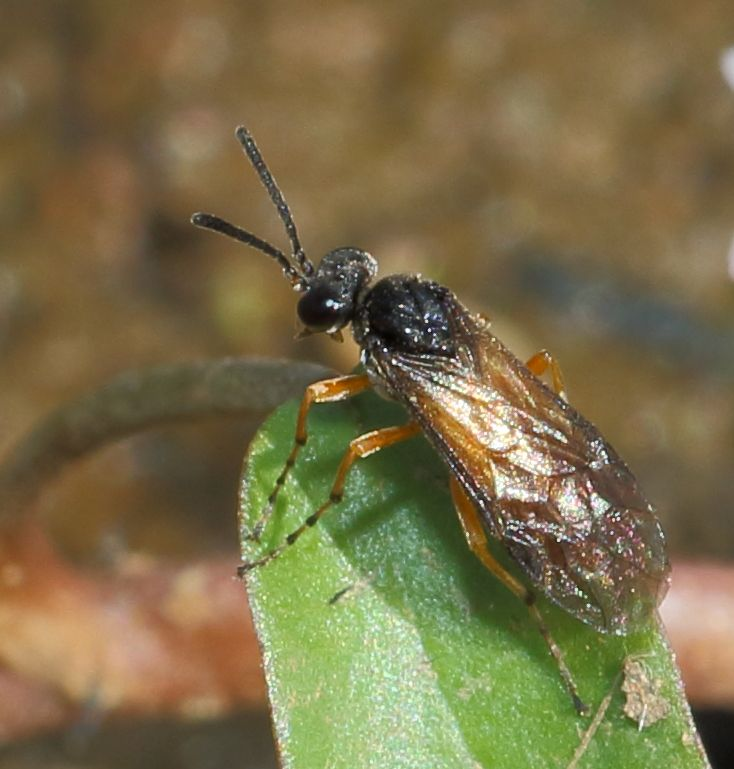
- Athalia sp.

Scientific classification
- Kingdom: Animalia
- Phylum: Arthropoda
- Clade: Pancrustacea
- Class: Insecta
- Order: Hymenoptera
- Suborder: Symphyta
- Family: Tenthredinidae
- Genus: Athalia; Leach, 1817

= Athalia (sawfly) =

Genus of sawflies

Athalia is a genus of sawflies belonging to the family Athaliidae. Species of the genus Athalia are found in Eurasia, Africa and North America.

== Species ==
The following species are recognised in the genus Athalia:

- Athalia abyssinica Forsius, 1930
- Athalia aethiopica Koch, 2006
- Athalia ancilla Serville, 1823
- Athalia armenica Zombori, 1978
- Athalia bicolor Serville, 1823
- Athalia birmanica Benson, 1962
- Athalia cerberus Benson, 1961
- Athalia chevini Lacourt, 1985
- Athalia circularis (Klug, 1815)
- Athalia concors Konow, 1908
- Athalia cordata Serville, 1823
- Athalia cordatoides Priesner, 1928
- Athalia cornubiae Benson, 1931
- Athalia doderoi Zombori, 1979
- Athalia erythraeana Madl, 2018
- Athalia excisa Koch, 2006
- Athalia flavobasalis Koch, 2007
- Athalia fumosa Gribodo, 1879
- Athalia gessi Koch, 2003
- Athalia himantopus (Benson, 1962)
- Athalia incomta Konow, 1908
- Athalia japonica (Klug, 1915)
- Athalia kashmirensis Benson, 1932
- Athalia liberta (Klug, 1815)
- Athalia longifoliae Kontuniemi, 1951
- Athalia lugens (Klug, 1815)
- Athalia marginipennis Enderlein, 1920
- Athalia nigromaculata Cameron, 1902
- Athalia obsoleta Benson, 1962
- Athalia paradoxa Konow, 1886
- Athalia proxima (Klug, 1915)
- Athalia nevadensis Lacourt, 1978
- Athalia rosae (Linnaeus, 1758)
- Athalia rufoscutellata Mocsáry, 1879
- Athalia scioensis Gribodo, 1879
- Athalia scutellariae Cameron, 1880
- Athalia sidamoensis Koch, 2007
- Athalia sjoestedti Konow, 1907
- Athalia taitaensis Koch, 2007
- Athalia truncata Enslin, 1913
- Athalia ustipennis Mocsáry, 1909
- Athalia vetuecclesiae Wappler et al., 2005
- Athalia vollenhoveni Gribodo, 1879
- Athalia wheeleri (Cockerell, 1906)
