= Attalia 32 =

Sailboat class

Development
- Designer: Joubert-Nivelt
- Location: France
- Year: 1982
- No. built: 871
- Builder: Jeanneau
- Role: Cruiser
- Name: Attalia 32

Boat
- Displacement: 7,496 lb (3,400 kg)
- Draft: 5.70 ft (1.74 m)

Hull
- Type: monohull
- Construction: fiberglass
- LOA: 30.54 ft (9.31 m)
- LWL: 25.92 ft (7.90 m)
- Beam: 10.83 ft (3.30 m)
- Engine: Volvo Penta 7 hp (5 kW) diesel engine

Hull appendages
- Keel: fin keel
- Ballast: 2,920 lb (1,324 kg)
- Rudder: skeg-mounted rudder

Rig
- Rig type: Bermuda rig
- I foretriangle height: 39.00 ft (11.89 m)
- J foretriangle base: 12.30 ft (3.75 m)
- P mainsail luff: 34.10 ft (10.39 m)
- E mainsail foot: 10.00 ft (3.05 m)

Sails
- Sailplan: masthead sloop
- Mainsail area: 195 sq ft (18.1 m^{2})
- Jib/genoa area: 201 sq ft (18.7 m^{2})
- Spinnaker area: 778 sq ft (72.3 m^{2})
- Other sails: genoa: 372 sq ft (34.6 m^{2}) solent: 283 sq ft (26.3 m^{2}) storm jib: 52 sq ft (4.8 m^{2})
- Upwind sail area: 567 sq ft (52.7 m^{2})
- Downwind sail area: 973 sq ft (90.4 m^{2})

The Attalia 32, or just Attalia, is a French sailboat that was designed by the Joubert-Nivelt design firm as a cruiser and first built in 1982.

The boat was based on the 1981 International Offshore Rule Half Ton class world champion, named Air Bigouden.

== Production ==
The design was built by Jeanneau in France, from 1982 until 1988 with 871 boats completed, but it is now out of production.

== Design ==
The Attalia 32 is a recreational keelboat, built predominantly of solid polyester fiberglass with a balsa-cored deck and teak wood trim. It has a masthead sloop rig, with a deck-stepped mast, a single set of unswept spreaders and aluminum spars with continuous stainless steel wire rigging. The hull has a raked stem, a reverse transom, a skeg-mounted rudder controlled by a tiller and a fixed fin keel, or optional stub keel and swing keel combination.

The fixed keel version displaces 7,496 lb (3,400 kg) and carries 2,723 lb (1,235 kg) of cast iron ballast, while the swing keel version displaces 7,749 lb (3,515 kg) and carries 2,976 lb (1,350 kg) of cast iron exterior ballast, with a steel swing keel.

The fixed keel-equipped version of the boat has a draft of 5.70 ft (1.74 m), while the swing keel-equipped version has a draft of 6.54 ft (1.99 m) with the keel extended and 3.62 ft (1.10 m) with it retracted, allowing operation in shallow water.

The boat is fitted with a Swedish Volvo Penta diesel engine of 7 hp (5 kW) for docking and maneuvering. The fuel tank holds 12 U.S. gallons (45 L; 10.0 imp gal) and the fresh water tank has a capacity of 24 U.S. gallons (91 L; 20 imp gal).

The design has sleeping accommodation for six people, with a double "V"-berth in the bow cabin, an L-shaped settee and a straight settee in the main cabin and an aft cabin with a double berth on the port side. The galley is located on the port side just forward of the companionway ladder. The galley is L-shaped and is equipped with a two-burner stove, a 26.4 U.S. gallons (100 L; 22.0 imp gal) ice box and a double sink. A navigation station is opposite the galley, on the starboard side. The head is located just aft of the navigation station on the starboard side and includes a shower. Cabin headroom is 76 in (193 cm).

For sailing downwind the design may be equipped with a symmetrical spinnaker of 778 sq ft (72.3 m^{2}).

The design has a hull speed of 6.82 kn (12.63 km/h).

== Operational history ==
Although designed for cruising, the boat has been quite successfully raced in PHRF competition.

In a 2002 review in Sailing Magazine, John Kretschmer wrote, "the Jeanneau Attalia is surprising boat. Because it hovers just off the radar screen for most U.S. sailors, it is an excellent value. The Attalia delivers comfort, performance and quality construction at a most affordable price."

== See also ==
- List of sailing boat types
