= Attalia (Libya) =

Libyan newspaper

Attalia (Arabic: الطليعة, 'The Vanguard') was an Arabic language weekly newspaper published from Tripoli, Libya. Attalia was founded in 1958, and served as the organ of the ICFTU-affiliated Libyan General Workers Union. As of 1961, Salem Shita was the proprietor and Ali Batar the editor of the newspaper, which had a circulation of 5,000 at the time. As of 1968, French diplomatic circles estimated the circulation of Attalia was 2,800. As of 1969, Salem Shita served as both proprietor and editor of Attalia.
