= Pipinas =

- Town
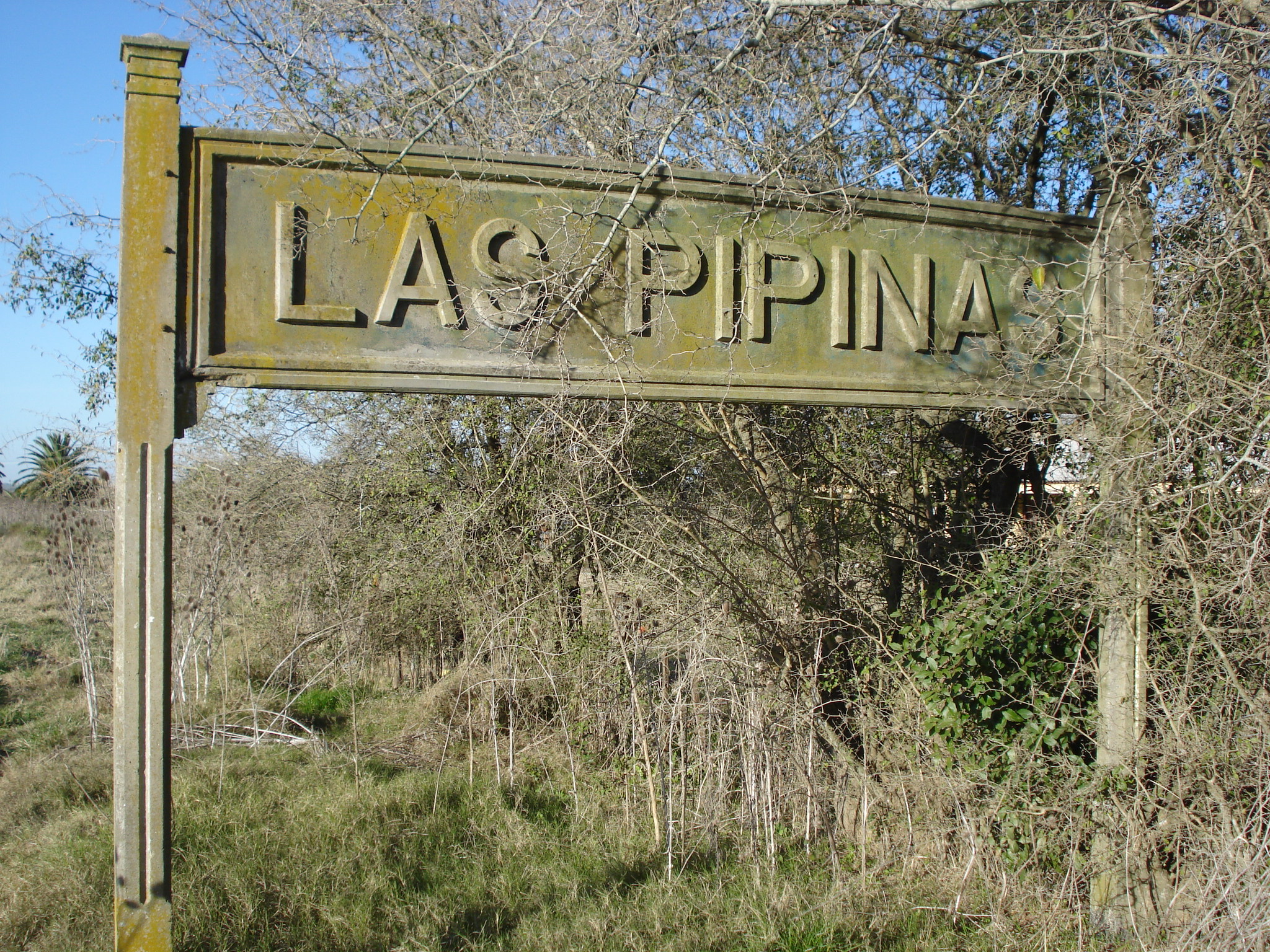

- Location within Buenos Aires Province
- Coordinates: 35°31′44″S 57°19′42″W
- Country: Argentina
- Province: Buenos Aires
- Partidos: Punta Indio
- Established: December 15, 1913
- Elevation: 11 m (36 ft)

Population (2001 Census)
  - Total: 1,020
- Time zone: UTC−3 (ART)
- CPA Base: B 1921
- Climate: Dfc

Pipinas is a town located in the Punta Indio Partido in the province of Buenos Aires, Argentina. The town was formerly a major center for the cement industry.

== Geography ==
Pipinas is located 108 km (67 mi) from the provincial capital of La Plata. The town is located along Provincial Route 36.

== History ==
Pipinas was founded on December 13, 1913, following the construction of a railway station in the area. Pipinas began to grow rapidly in the 1930s, when it was discovered after a visit from an engineer that the town sat on a major deposit of limestone. A large plant was built by CORCEMAR, a cement company, in the town in 1939, which led to a workers community being set up. Electricity did not arrive in the town until the 1970s. Passenger and freighter rail service ended in 1977.

The economy began to decline in later years, with the cement plant laying off nearly half of all their workers after being acquired by another company in 1991, and the factory began to cease operations in the 1990s. The cement plant permanently closed in 2001.

In 2012, Pipinas was announced to be the center of the Tronador II Project, where the town would become a center for space rocket and orbital satellite production. Work on the project was paused in 2015, however it was announced to be resuming in 2020. The project is again facing budget issues due to cuts from the parent company, VENG S.A., under Javier Milei, the current Argentine president.

== Economy ==
Following the closure of the cement plant in the early 2000s, the town's economy is now primarily based on tourism. The town has gained notoriety for its food and restaurant industry. A cooperative was set up in the early 2000s to promote tourism in the town.

As part of the greater Thunder II project in Pipinas, a "space stand" showing a model replica of the project was constructed for tourists.

== Population ==
According to INDEC, which collects population data for the country, the town had a population of 1,020 people as of the 2001 census. During the peak years of the cement industry, the town had a population of around 4,000.

== Climate ==
Climate data for Pipinas, Buenos Aires (Punta Indio Naval Air Base) 1991–2020, extremes 1961–present
Month	Jan	Feb	Mar	Apr	May	Jun	Jul	Aug	Sep	Oct	Nov	Dec	Year
Record high °C (°F)	43.1 (109.6)	39.1 (102.4)	37.2 (99.0)	32.4 (90.3)	28.8 (83.8)	24.9 (76.8)	28.3 (82.9)	30.0 (86.0)	30.0 (86.0)	34.6 (94.3)	36.8 (98.2)	39.8 (103.6)	43.1 (109.6)
Mean daily maximum °C (°F)	27.9 (82.2)	27.0 (80.6)	25.2 (77.4)	21.7 (71.1)	18.0 (64.4)	14.8 (58.6)	13.7 (56.7)	15.8 (60.4)	17.5 (63.5)	20.5 (68.9)	23.5 (74.3)	26.6 (79.9)	21.0 (69.8)
Daily mean °C (°F)	23.0 (73.4)	22.2 (72.0)	20.4 (68.7)	16.7 (62.1)	13.2 (55.8)	10.2 (50.4)	9.2 (48.6)	10.8 (51.4)	12.8 (55.0)	15.9 (60.6)	18.7 (65.7)	21.4 (70.5)	16.2 (61.2)
Mean daily minimum °C (°F)	18.3 (64.9)	17.6 (63.7)	16.0 (60.8)	12.4 (54.3)	9.3 (48.7)	6.3 (43.3)	5.4 (41.7)	6.6 (43.9)	8.5 (47.3)	11.5 (52.7)	14.0 (57.2)	16.5 (61.7)	11.9 (53.4)
Record low °C (°F)	5.5 (41.9)	4.0 (39.2)	0.6 (33.1)	0.2 (32.4)	−2.0 (28.4)	−7.5 (18.5)	−4.6 (23.7)	−4.1 (24.6)	−2.6 (27.3)	−0.6 (30.9)	2.0 (35.6)	3.5 (38.3)	−7.5 (18.5)
Average precipitation mm (inches)	97.4 (3.83)	116.1 (4.57)	94.8 (3.73)	93.8 (3.69)	67.5 (2.66)	69.3 (2.73)	82.5 (3.25)	68.9 (2.71)	77.2 (3.04)	95.9 (3.78)	94.8 (3.73)	82.3 (3.24)	1,040.5 (40.96)
Average precipitation days (≥ 0.1 mm)	6.4	7.2	7.0	7.3	6.1	5.6	6.5	6.2	6.7	7.9	6.9	6.7	80.5
Average snowy days	0.0	0.0	0.0	0.0	0.0	0.0	0.1	0.0	0.0	0.0	0.0	0.0	0.1
Average relative humidity (%)	76.4	79.6	81.7	84.3	86.6	86.8	86.3	84.3	82.6	81.6	78.4	75.3	82.0
Mean monthly sunshine hours	291.4	234.8	220.1	183.0	161.2	138.0	145.7	170.5	177.0	210.8	255.0	288.3	2,475.8
Mean daily sunshine hours	9.4	8.3	7.1	6.1	5.2	4.6	4.7	5.5	5.9	6.8	8.5	9.3	6.8
Percentage possible sunshine	65	63	60	60	55	46	46	52	51	54	60	60	56
Source 1: Servicio Meteorológico Nacional
Source 2: NOAA (percent sun 1961–1990)
