= Church of Atalaia =

- Church of Our Lady of the Assumption
- Igreja da Atalaia
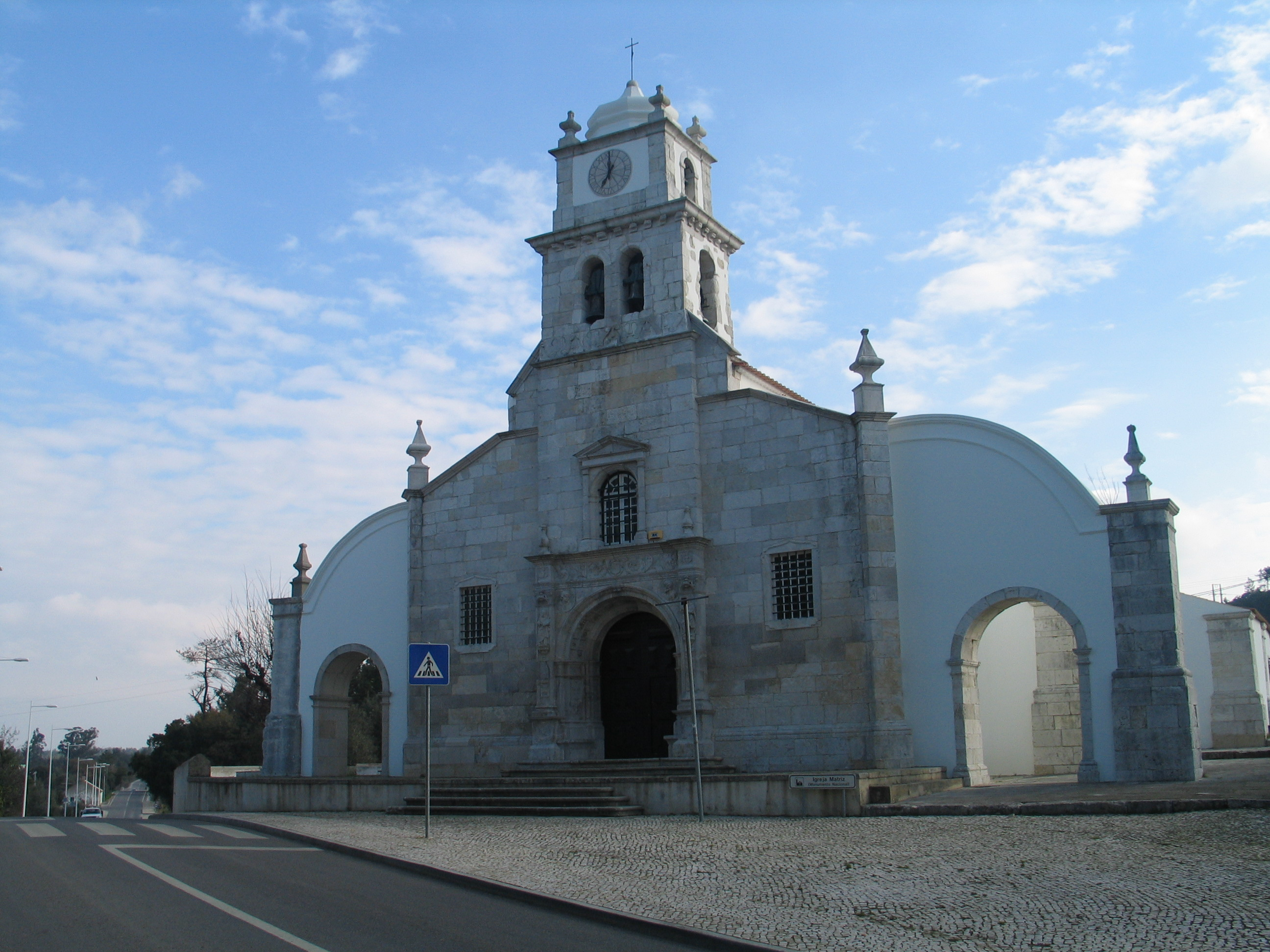
- The mixture of architectural styles are evident in the front facade of the Church of Atalaia, that combines Gothic, Renaissance, Mannerist and Baroque elements
- Church of Atalaia
- 39°28′57.97″N 8°27′1.32″W
- Location: Santarém, Médio Tejo, Centro
- Country: Portugal
- Denomination: Roman Catholic

Architecture
- Style: Gothic, Renaissance, Mannerism, Baroque

Specifications
- Length: 28.57 m (93.7 ft)
- Width: 20.97 m (68.8 ft)

Administration
- Diocese: Diocese of Santarém

The Church of Atalaia (Portuguese: Igreja da Atalaia) is a church in the civil parish of Atalaia, municipality of Vila Nova da Barquinha, in the Centro region of Portugal. The Renaissance-era religious building, has been molded by successive layers of Mannerist and Baroque decorative and structural elements, that include the portico, but whose origin dates to the Gothic architecture of the early 16th century (that includes the roofing, vaulted-ceilings and two-level presbytery). The unique central tower, Baroque azulejo tile-work and 16th century pulpit are important characteristics of this parish church.

== History ==
It is likely that the church was founded or rebuilt in 1528 by D. Pedro de Menezes, Master of Cantanhede, whose coat-of-arms were sculpted into the portico and intersections of the presbytery's vaulted ceiling. At the time the church was dedicated to Nossa Senhora da Assunção (Our Lady of the Assumption), its date fixed by an inscription in the churches triumphal arch. The design was elaborated by João de Castilho, while the decorative elements of the main doorway were completed by João de Ruão.

In the second half of the 18th century the mausoleum to cardinal D. José Manuel was installed in the church.

The first record work on the grounds occurred in 1936, with landscaping of the churchyard by the DGMEN Direcção Geral dos Edifícios e Monumentos Nacionais (General-Directorate for Buildings and National Monuments). For the next five years there were successive projects to recuperate and/or improve the church: in 1937, the reconstruction of the lateral altars and retable; in 1938, the extension and reconstruction of the roof and opening of the northern facade; in 1939, the modification of the sacristy, with the lowering of the walls, demolition of the exterior wall and ossuary to expose the original walls; restoration of the windows and primitive buttresses; repaving with stone; and in 1941, the substitution of the old tower clock.

In 1955, the confessionals were recovered and arranged.

Installation of electrical services and sound system occurred in 1960–1961, in addition to new repairs to the roof.

Similar public works to the roof were completed in 1969, in addition to repairs to doors and frames, restoration of the pediments, and repair of the stained glass windows in the ossuary.

The ceiling was repaired, again in 1975, 1979 and 1986, in addition to repairs to the doors, painting and substitution of a column (1975/1979).

On 1 June 1992, the property was placed on the protection of the IPPA Instituto Português do Património Arquitectónico (Portuguese Institute of Architectural Patrimony), the forerunner of the IGESPAR, by decree 106F/92.

== Architecture ==
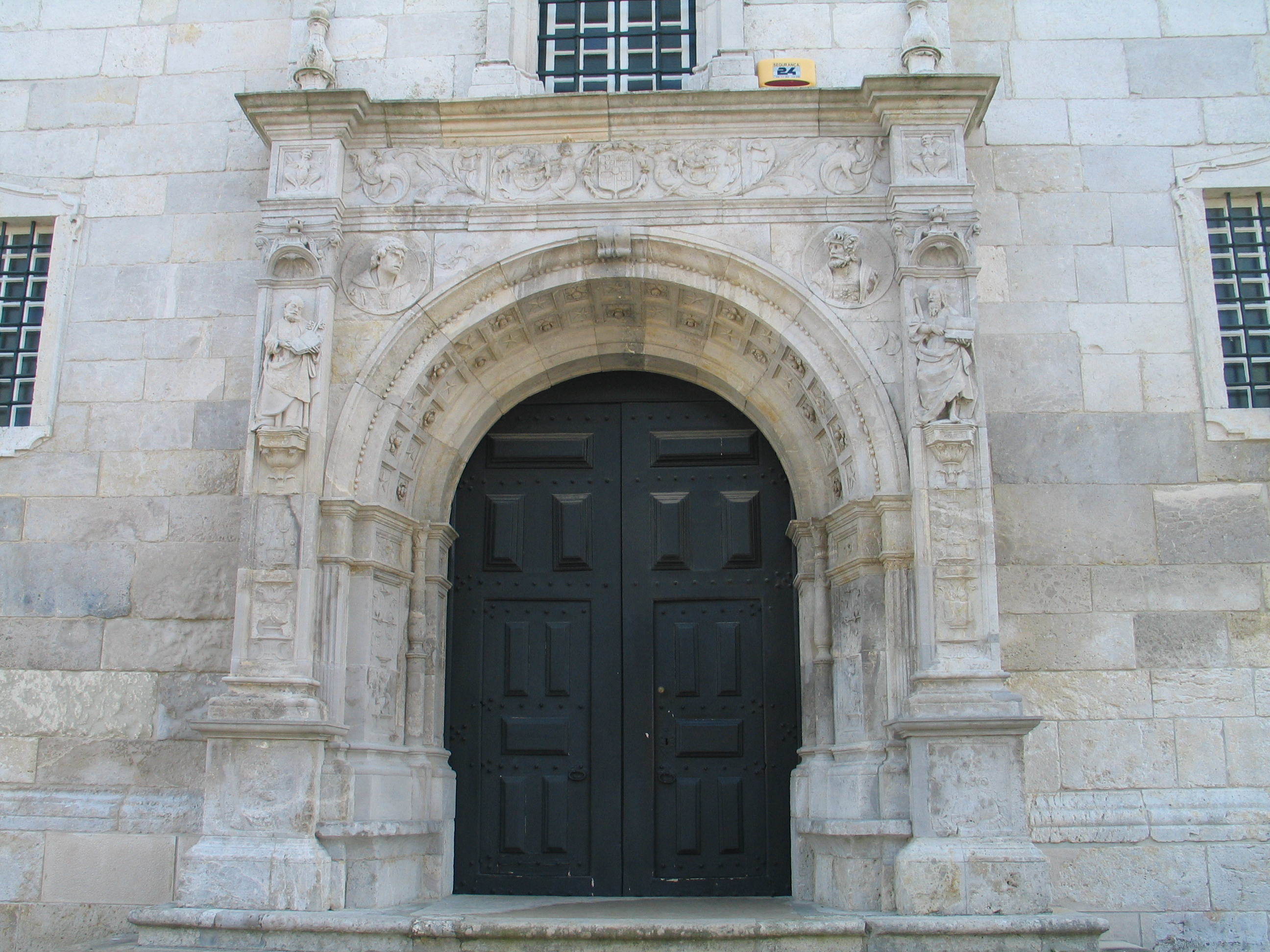
The main portico of the facade/tower of the church

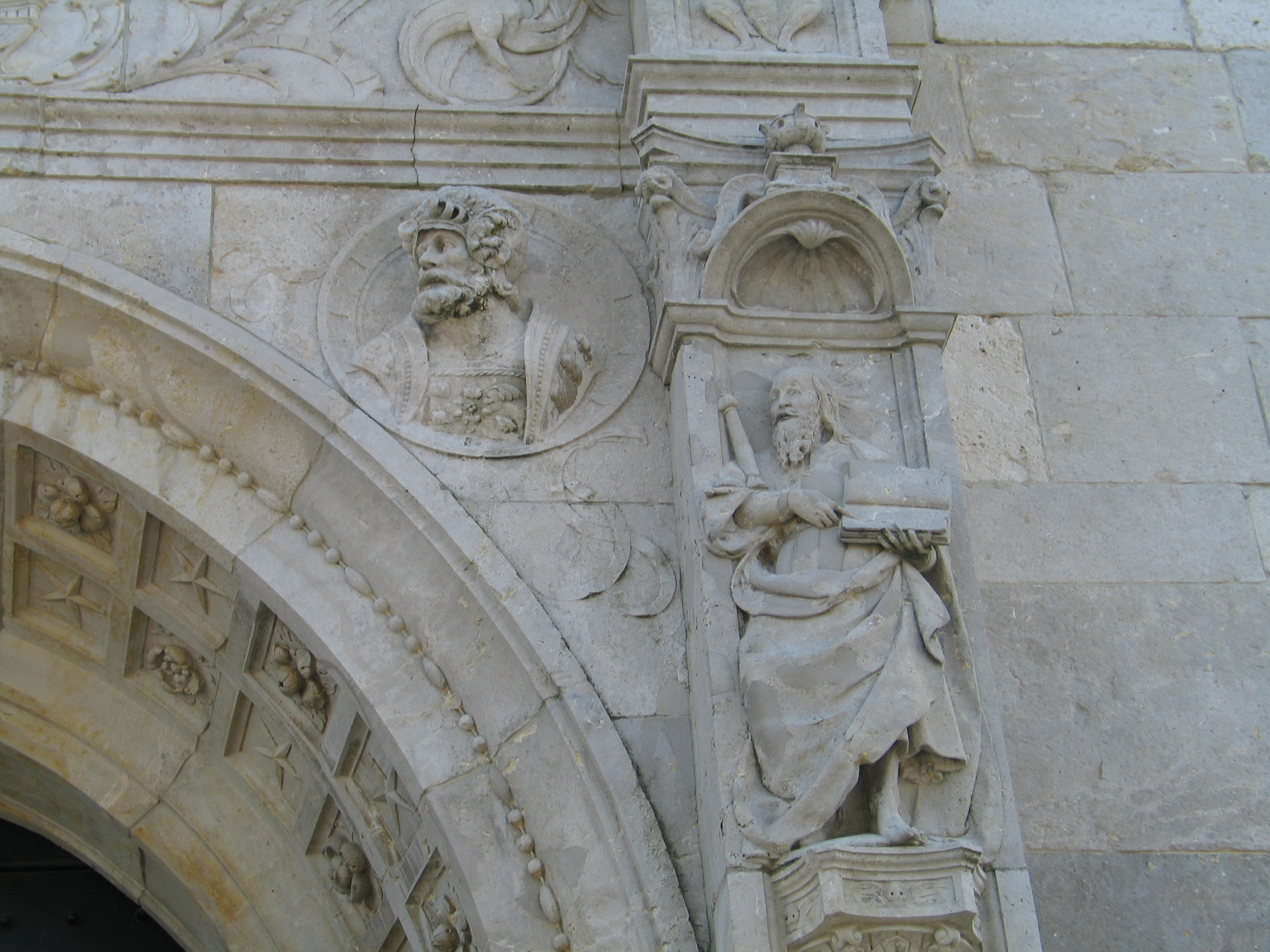
Detail from the main doorway and tympanum

The church is located in an urban context, fronted by a public roadway and encircled by small public space.

The longitudinal plan features a central nave and transept, but departs from the traditional standards. The main face of the church is defined by a bell-tower and lateral extensions; rounded gables extend from the belltower/entrance facade topped with corners and pilasters decorated with pinnacles. These extensions serve as lateral "entrances" to the public spaces, with their own rounded arches.

The four-story, central body includes a portico and entablature with jamb supporting a large window, crowned by tympanum by João de Ruão. In Roman arch portico with square soffits, is decorated with rosettas and stars, delimited by pilasters and an entablature. The arch stands on a frame consisting of decorated pilasters and small columnar balustrades. Over the archivolts are decorated astragali, while flanking the door are pilasters divided by cornices with niches that contain the relief images of Saint Peter and Saint Paul (on either side), surmounted by urns. In bass relief are two profiles: on the left, a male figure, and on the right a female figure. The entablature, with sculpted frieze, has the coat-of-arms of the Cantanhede family, while the on either extreme ends of the architrave are two decorative spires.

Flanking the main entrance are two large grated, rectangular windows, midway between the door frame and surmounted window (in the center). While the base is interrupted by a staircase of two flights, of three steps (providing access to the main portico), the three subsequent registers extend above the main entrance. This central block (consisting of separate registers for the portico, window, bell-tower and clock) were constructed in the Renaissance-era style, and distinguishable from the younger elements. The belfry includes two rounded arches on the front and back facades, while single arches on lateral faces. Meanwhile, the clock face only appears on the front face of the tower, with lateral arch openings on either side.

=== Interior ===
The three-nave interior includes five frames, with the first shorter than the rest, while a polygonal presbytery is connected directly to the sacristy.

Roman arcades are supported by columnar drums fitted to the base with Ionic capitals. In the last frame the columns encounter the eastern wall and jambs of the triumphal arch, in simple motif, whose blocks are carved in grotesque motifs, and extend to the level the drums and capitals.

On top of the lateral naves, are two square-framed aedicules carved from columns.

The five-faceted, polygonal presbytery is covered in vaulted cross-shaped ceiling, forming a Greek cross with sharp edges, rosettas and the coat-of-arms of the Cantanhede family.

In the first frame of the lateral walls are two narrow windows with rounded frame. On the left wall is the embedded mausoleum of Cardinal D. José Manuel, who was the second patriarch of Lisbon, and family member of the Counts of Atalaia. The walls of the lateral naves are decorated along the footer by sillar azulejo tiles in blue and white. Over these are pattern azulejo in blue and yellow, with scenes from the New Testament and life of the saints. In addition, there are azulejo panels with the scenes from the Old Testament that decorate the sections of the central nave. Over the triumphal arch is another azulejo panel in blue and yellow, with the dove of the Holy Spirit.

Over corbels, on the presbytery wall, is an image of the Virgin. Abutting the fourth column of the lateral nave, is the pulpit with wooden balustrades and stone base.

One of the better known artifacts in the church is a vermeil chalice dating to the 16th century and an armoire to guard the holy oils.
