= General Mansilla, Buenos Aires =

General Mansilla
- Town
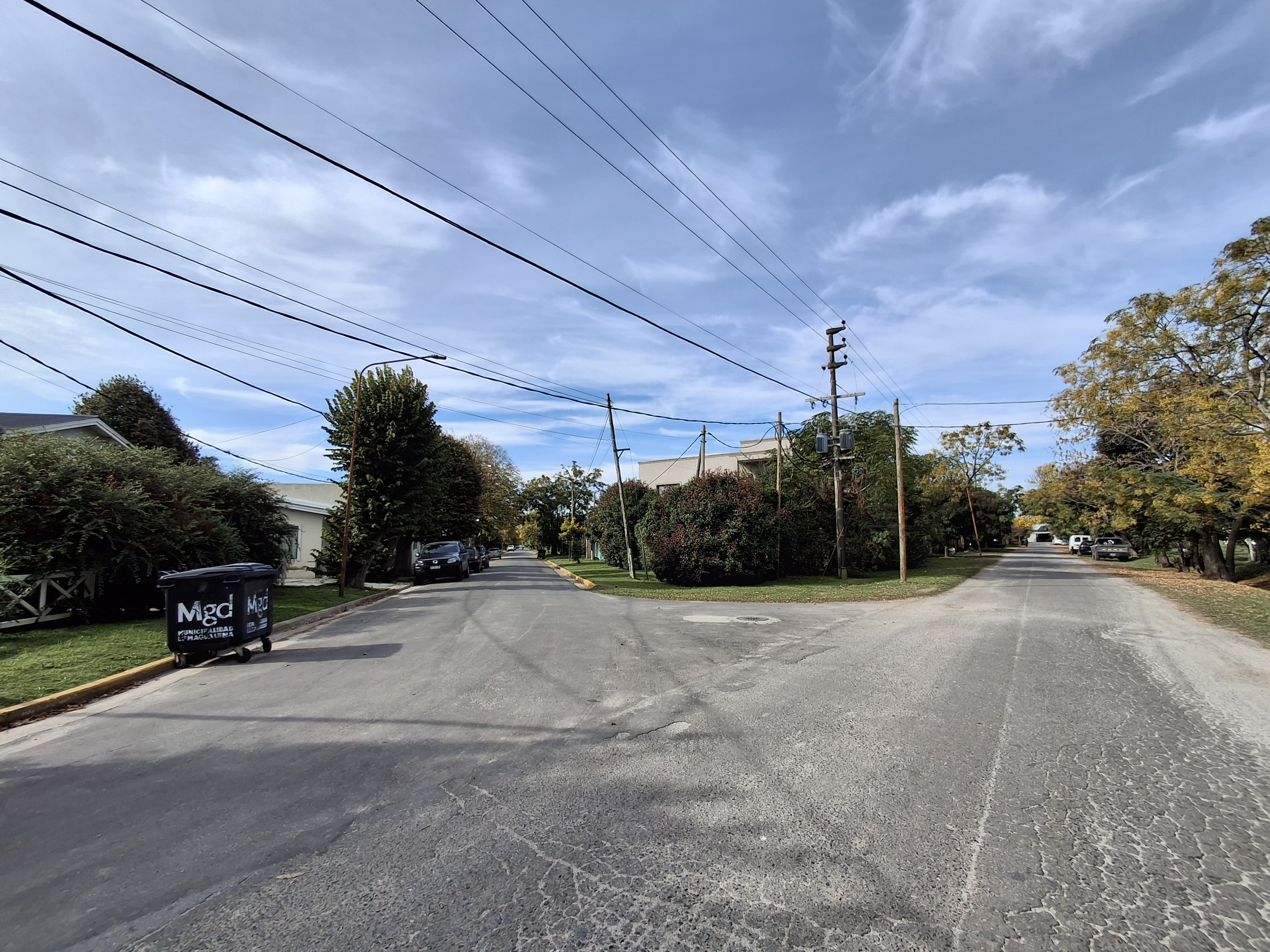

- Location within Buenos Aires Province
- Coordinates: 35°4′47″S 57°44′49″W
- Country: Argentina
- Province: Buenos Aires
- Partidos: Magdalena
- Established: August 14, 1901
- Elevation: 22 m (72 ft)

Population (2001 Census)
  - Total: 1,684
- Time zone: UTC−3 (ART)
- CPA Base: B 1911
- Climate: Dfc

General Mansilla, also sometimes referred to as Bartolomé Bavio or simply Bavio, is a town located in the Magdalena Partido in the province of Buenos Aires, Argentina. Located 40 km (25 mi) from the city and provincial capital of La Plata, General Mansilla was founded in 1901, and named in honor of Lucio Norberto Mansilla, a general who fought in the Argentine War of Independence. The decree establishing the town was signed by the provincial governor of the time on August 14. A rail station had previously been built in 1887 following a land donation from a man named Bartolomé Bavio, who the developers later named the station after. The rail line which passed through the town was the first in the partido. A school was built in the region in 1899. Rail service lasted until the 1970s. The end of rail service led to a considerable decline in the town's status.

In 2004, a report found that nearly 30% of the town's population, or roughly 309 individuals, had been diagnosed with Enterobius vermicularis, a parasitic worm infection. 41% of all children in the town were affected with the disease. Outside of this, General Mansilla has also suffered from insect swarms, a notable one occurring in 2019 consisting mostly of flies. The insects likely originated from poor waste management from a nearby poultry farm.

Since the end of rail service, the economy of General Mansilla has primarily been based on agriculture. The town is also a center for the dairy industry. According to INDEC, which collects population data for the country, the town had a population of 1,684 people as of the 2001 census. In the 2010 census, the town's population had grown to 2,022, or around a 16.7% increase from the previous census. Actress Tita Merello lived in the town as a child when she was around the age of 10.
