= Magdalena, Buenos Aires =

Magdalena
- Interactive map of Magdalena
- Coordinates: 35°05′S 57°31′W
- Country: Argentina
- Province: Buenos Aires
- Partido: Magdalena
- Founded: May 16, 1611
- Elevation: 21 m (69 ft)

Population (2001 census [INDEC])
  - Total: 9,294
- CPA Base: B 1913
- Area code: +54 2221

Magdalena (Spanish pronunciation: [maɣðaˈlena]) is a town in Buenos Aires Province, Argentina. It is the headquarters town for the Magdalena Partido.

== History ==
Founded in 1611, the hamlet grew slowly until the late nineteenth century. The Parish of Santa María Magdalena (Mary Magdalene), consecrated in 1776, inaugurated its current temple in 1860. The Italianate City Hall, designed by Pedro Cavalli, was completed in 1877, and the Teatro Español, in 1899. The nearby Parque Costero del Sur, site of the El Ancla pre-Columbian settlement, was declared a UNESCO World Heritage Site in 1984.

The largest freshwater oil spill in history occurred on January 15, 1999 after the German ship Sea Paraná hit the Estrella Pampeana ship of the Shell company. More than 30,000 cubic meters of hydrocarbons were spilled, along with 5.4 million litres of oil floating on the waters of the Rio de la Plata. This ruined the ecosystem of the surrounding areas, and tourism does not exist anymore.

In 2002, the municipality filed a claim for 35 million dollars to the Shell company, but it was not backed up by the national or provincial governments. As a compromise, the company agreed to pay 10 million dollars and aid to the town. The two sides agreed to sign on those terms, but the money and "aid" have still not been received. The lack of help is still prevalent in the town whose waters are now only used for residents who choose to bathe in them.
