= Atalaya, Argentina =

Atalaya
- City
- Martu te Amo
- Coordinates: 35°1′27″S 57°31′59″W
- Country: Argentina
- Province: Buenos Aires
- Partido: Magdalena
- Elevation: 4 m (13 ft)

Population (2010 census [INDEC])
  - Total: 720
- CPA Base: B 1913
- Area code: +54 2221

Atalaya is a city in Buenos Aires Province, Argentina, in the Magdalena Partido.
