= Atalia (Mayr) =

Atalia is an Italian-language oratorio by Simon Mayr to a libretto by Felice Romani, premiered in Naples, 1822.

== Recordings ==
- Atalía - Atalia: Rebecca Martin, Abner: Jacek Janiszewski, Gioas: Maria Jette, Giocada: Thomas Cooley, Matan: James Taylor; Simon Mayr Chor Ingolstadt, Neue Düsseldorfer Hofmusik, Franz Hauk (live 20 September 2003) Guild
