= Punta Indio Partido =

Punta Indio Partido de Punta Indio
- Department
- location of Punta Indio Partido in Buenos Aires Province
- Coordinates: 35°16′S 57°13′W
- Country: Argentina
- Established: December 6, 1994
- Founder: provincial law
- Seat: Verónica

Government
  - Intendant: David Angueira (PJ)

Area
  - Total: 1,610 km^{2} (620 sq mi)

Population
  - Total: 9,362
  - Density: 5.81/km^{2} (15.1/sq mi)
- Demonym: puntaindiense
- Postal Code: B1917
- IFAM: BUE100
- Area Code: 02221
- Website: www.puntaindio.gov.ar

Punta Indio Partido is a partido on the Atlantic coast of Buenos Aires Province in Argentina.

It was created in 1994, as an excision from the old Magdalena Partido.

The provincial subdivision has a population of about 9,000 inhabitants in an area of 1,610 square kilometres (620 sq mi), and its capital city is Verónica, which is around 140 km (87 mi) from Buenos Aires.

== Settlements ==
- Alvarez Jonte, population 40
- Pipinas, population 1,020
- Verónica, population 5,772
- Punta Indio, population 666
