= Magdalena Partido =

Magdalena Partido de Magdalena
- Department

- location of Magdalina Partido in Buenos Aires Province
- Coordinates: 35°05′S 57°31′W
- Country: Argentina
- Established: May 16, 1611
- Seat: Magdalena

Government
  - Mayor: Lisandro Hourcade (UCR)

Area
  - Total: 1,785 km^{2} (689 sq mi)

Population
  - Total: 19,301
  - Density: 10.81/km^{2} (28.01/sq mi)
- Demonym: magdalenense
- Postal Code: B1913
- IFAM: BUE076
- Area Code: 02221
- Website: magdalena.gob.ar

Magdalena Partido (Spanish pronunciation: [maɣðaˈlena]) is a partido in the northeastern part of Buenos Aires Province in Argentina.

The provincial subdivision has a population of about 16,000 inhabitants in an area of 1,785 km^{2} (689 sq mi), and its capital city is Magdalena, which is 87 km (54 mi) from Buenos Aires.

== Settlements ==
- Magdalena
- General Mansilla (Estación Bartolomé Bavio)
- Atalaya
- Vieytes
