= Provincial Route 11 (Buenos Aires) =

Road in Buenos Aires Province, Argentina

Provincial Route 11
- Ruta provincial 11

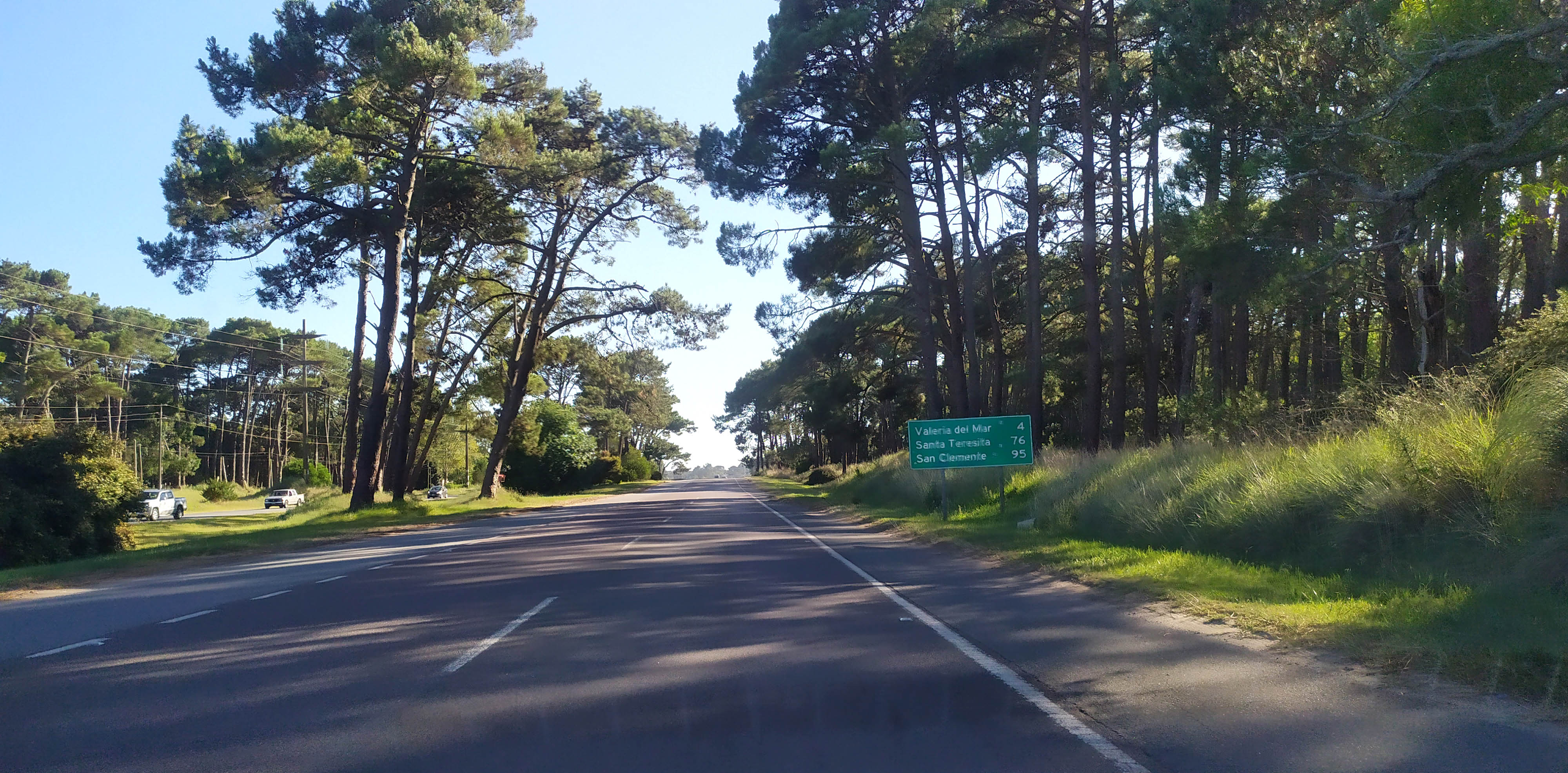
- Route 11 (east side) near Cariló in 2026

Route information
- Maintained by AUBASA
- Length: 583 km (362 mi)
- Existed: 1932; 94 years ago–present

Major junctions
- North end: in Punta Lara
- ,,,,,,,,,
- South end: Calle 100 in Mar del Sur

Location
- Country: Argentina
- Major cities: Punta Lara, La Plata, Magdalena, Punta Indio, Gral. Conesa, General Lavalle, San Clemente del Tuyú, Santa Teresita, Buenos Aires, San Bernardo, Mar de Ajó, Cariló, Pinamar, Villa Gesell, Santa Clara del Mar, Mar del Plata, Chapadmalal, Miramar

Highway system
- Highways in Argentina

Provincial Route 11 (also named "Interbalnearia" after its new path was completed in 1979) is a 583-kilometre-long (362 mi) Argentine road in the East of Buenos Aires Province. The road extends from Punta Lara (starting in the junction with PR 19) to the town of Mar del Sur.

Route 11 runs along the coasts of the Río de la Plata and the Atlantic Ocean, with a high number of cars passing the road during summertime. The path between Magdalena and the intersection with Provincial Route 36 is still a gravel road so the route has not been paved to date. On the other hand, from the crossing with Provincial Route 63 (popularly known as Esquina de Crotto) to the town of General Conesa, the route becomes a dual carriageway, totalizing 30 km with two carriages per way. The stretch between Pinamar and Villa Gesell the route becomes a dual carriageway again.

This road contributed to development of the cities situated on the Buenos Aires Province coast at the Nort of Mar del Plata, due to the only town of the region reached by railway was Pinamar. The train that departed from General Guido until its terminus in Divisadero de Pinamar (a branch-line of General Roca Railway from Buenos Aires to Mar del Plata) operated from 1949 to 1968, being reestablished in December 1996; although in April 2015, it was closed again, remaining inactive to date.

== History ==
=== The beginning ===
The first works on the road were made in the zone of Mar del Plata. The path between the downtown and Camet Park was paved in 1928, then followed by the pavement of the stretch to the Punta Mogotes lighthouse, finished in 1933.

In 1932, the Camino de la Costa a provincial road that extended from Avellaneda to Mar del Plata along with the coasts of the Río de la Plata and the Atlantic Ocean was opened. Four years later the coast road in Punta Lara was built. Nevertheless, the Sudestada (Southeast blow) caused a flooding that destroyed most of the road. For that reason, a wall was raised to avoid floodings; nevertheless, the water was eroding the wall until in July 1958, a new swell of the river brought down the wall, destroying the "Camino Costanero" (as Route 11 was also called). The flooding not only damaged the road but about 100,000 houses were devastated by the unstoppable course of the water

The paved road from Mar del Plata and Miramar was built between 1937 and 1938, while the stretch between La Plata and Magdalena was finished in 1961.

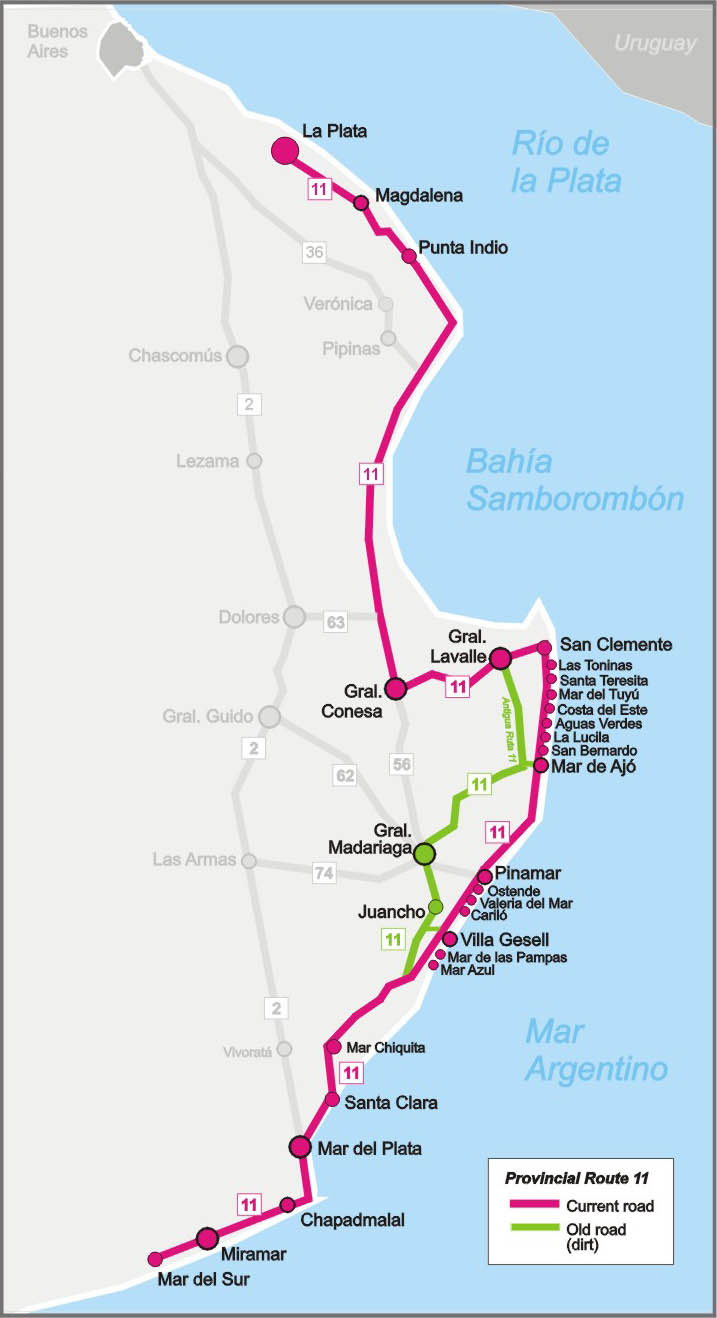
In red, current Route 11 (Interbalnearia) built in the 1970s. The original road is marked in green

In early 1970s, the Ministry of public works of Buenos Aires Province announced that there were two projects for route 11: the first included the paving of the actual road that passed through the cities of General Madariaga and Juancho, while a second alternative consisted of the construction of a new road (named "Ruta Interbalnearia") that would start in the point where the old route 11 turned to General Madariaga –near the city of General Lavalle– extending 12 kms east to San Clemente del Tuyú. The road then would run nearest to the coast, from north to south along the cities of La Costa Partido, for a total length of 62 km. The project included the build of eight entrances to those cities (the actual route 11 had only road access to San Clemente, Santa Teresita, and Mar de Ajó).

Finally, the second option was chosen, despite the protests of the General Lavalle inhabitants (specially the cattle breeders, who alleged the new road would affect their economic activities). The construction costs saving ($4 million) and the more favorable conditions to promote the development of La Costa Partido were the reasons given by the Ministry to build the Ruta Interbalnearia. A call for tender was conducted in September 1971.

When the Interbalnearia was definitely finished and inaugurated in 1979, some parts of the original road had changed. It has remained as a gravel road since then.

In 1986, the Government of Buenos Aires Province transferred the stretch of the road crossing the urban area of Mar del Plata, to General Pueyrredón Partido On December 5, 1987, the paved path from Miramar to Mar del Sur was opened to traffic

=== Concession ===
On September 19, 1990, the contract of concession was signed. The management of the road was subsequently given to "Camino del Atlántico" ("Road of the Atlantic" in Spanish), which would take over the maintenance of the Route from the intersection with Provincial Route 36 to the traffic circle access to Santa Clara del Mar. The contract was for a term of 15 years, with the option to be extended to 20 years through a special clause. The toll booths were placed in "Paraje La Huella", near General Conesa, and Mar Chiquita.

During 1996, the concessionary built a dual carriageway between the cities of Pinamar and Villa Gesell, financed by an increase of the toll rates which was made effective once the works finished.

In December 2010, a 10 km path between Santa Clara del Mar and Parque Camet was opened. The works had a cost of $43 million.

In July 2011, the Government of Buenos Aires trespassed the management of the Route 11 to "Autovía del Mar" for a term of 30 years. The company also manages Provincial routes Autovía 2, 63, 56, 74 and 36. In 2016, Governor of Buenos Aires, María Eugenia Vidal revoked concessions so route 11 become state-owned again.

== Major intersections ==
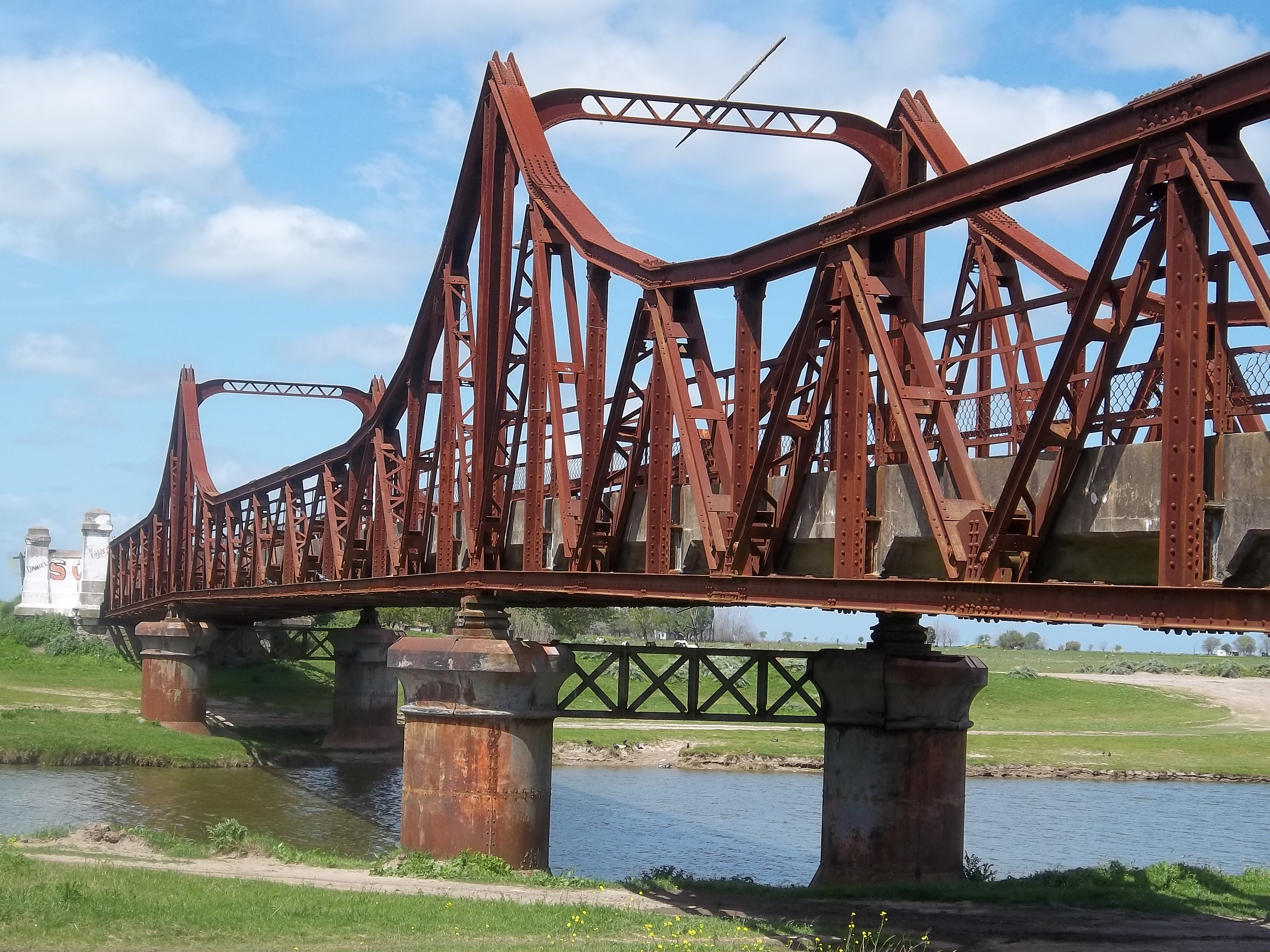
Old bridge over Canal 1 in Villa Roch. This bridge has been definitely closed for security reasons

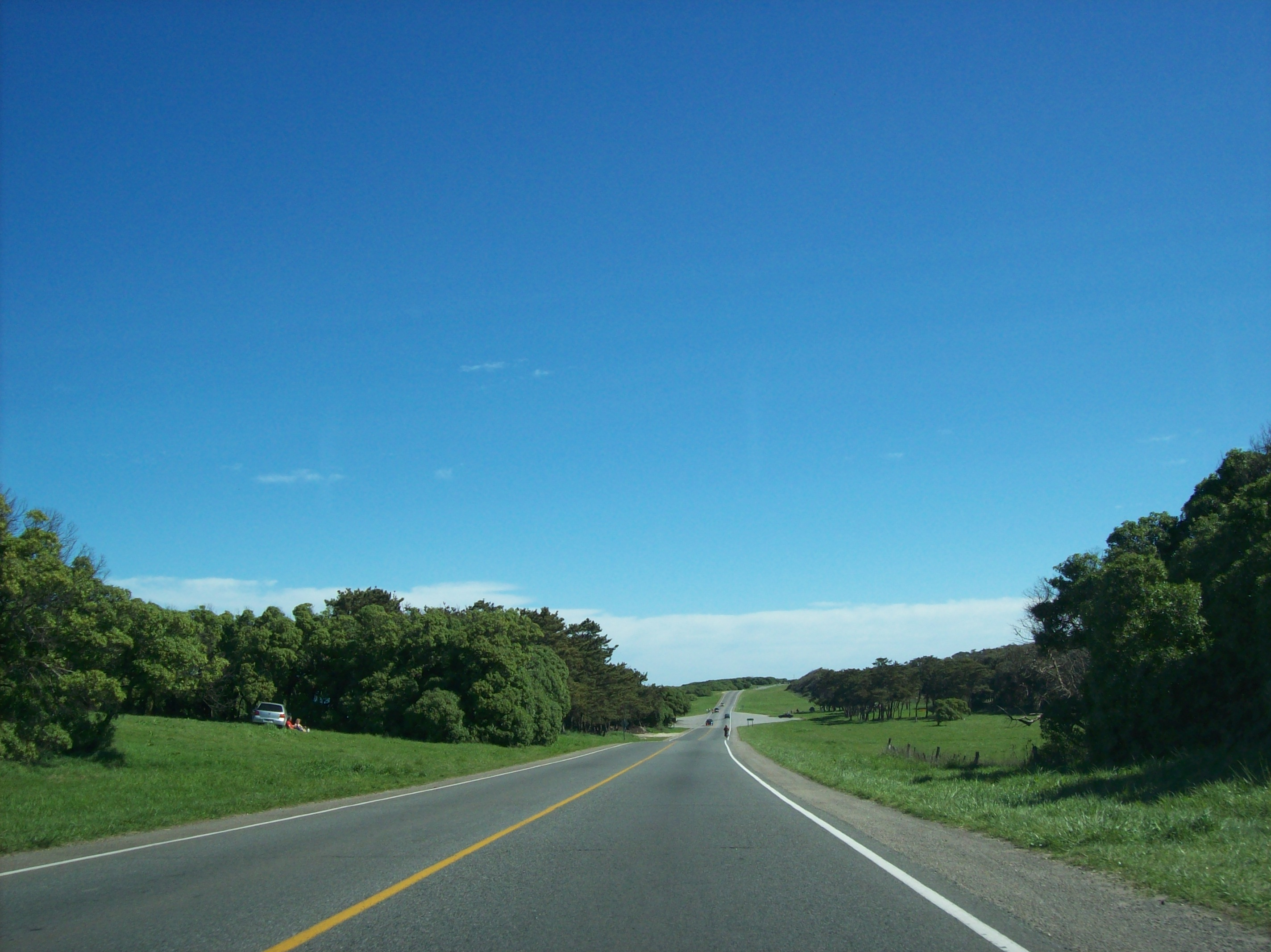
Route 11 between Mar del Plata and Chapadmalal

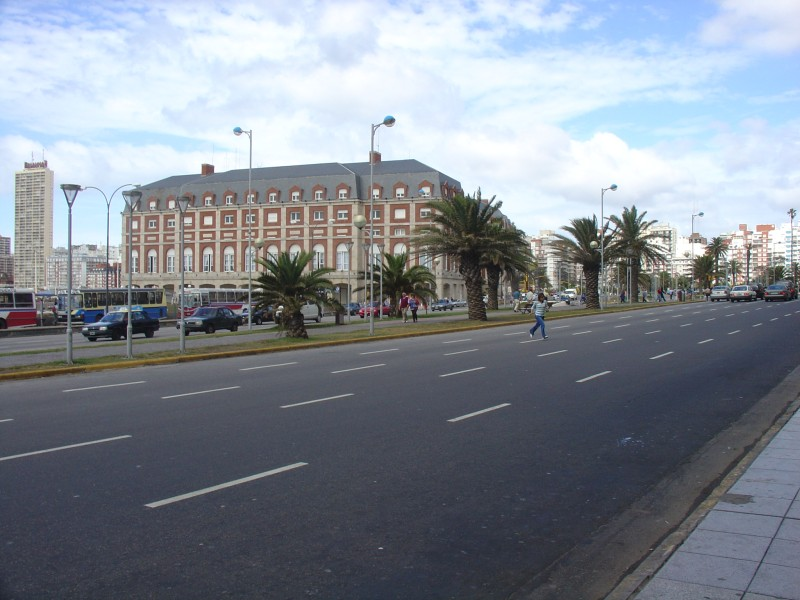
Casino Central next to Route 11, in the urban zone of Mar del Plata

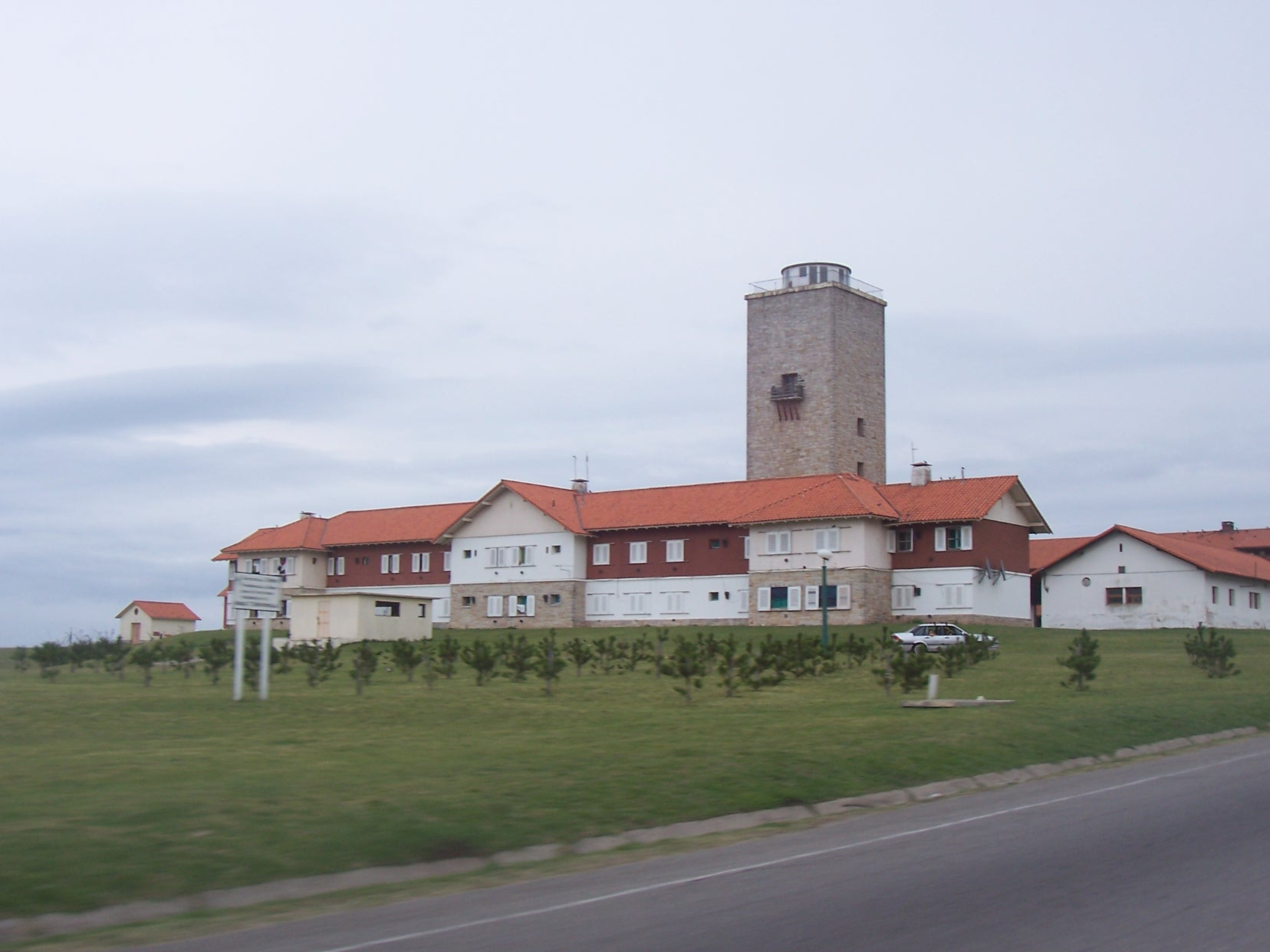
The hotel complex of Chapadmalal as seen from the Route 11

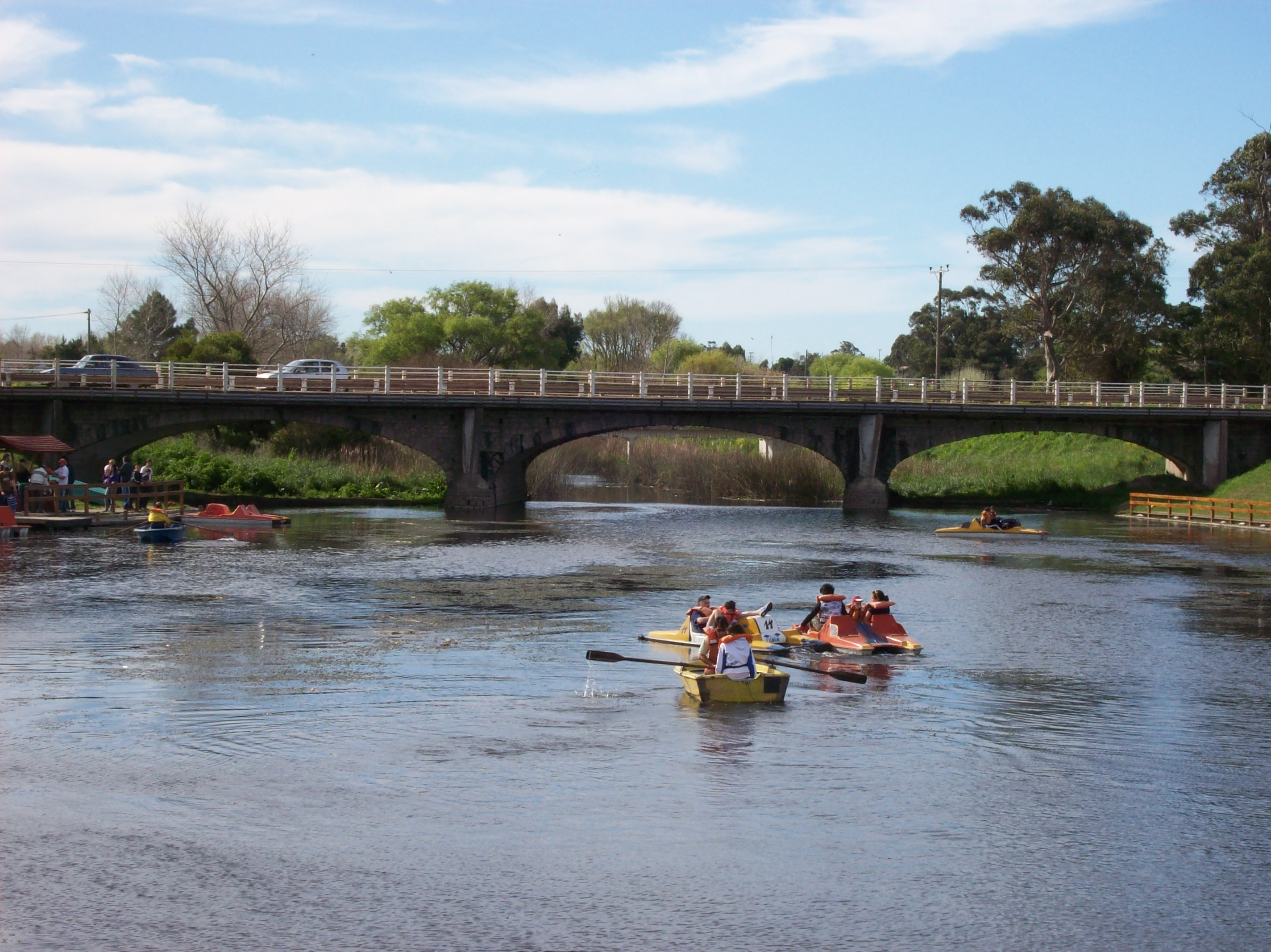
Bridge over Chapadmalal stream

Partido	City	km	mi	Exit	Destinations	Notes
Ensenada	Punta Lara	6	3.72	1	Av. Alte. Brown to Ensenada (south)	
La Plata	La Plata	12.5	7.76	–	FCR's La Plata (west) – Destilería YPF (east) line	level crossing (active) (Note: Railtracks for freight services only. Part of those tracks are used by the University train of La Plata.)
La Plata	La Plata	12.8	7.98	1	to Buenos Aires (north)	
La Plata	La Plata	17	10.56	1	to (east)	
Berisso	Berisso	35	3	1	to La Plata (north)	
Magdalena	Magdalena	43	26.71	1	to Camino Prov. 65 (west)	R54 to Gral. Mansilla (west) (Note: The town is mostly known as "Bartolomé Bavio", as the railway station is named like that.)
Magdalena	Magdalena	63	39.14	1	to (west)	R29 to Ranchos (west)
Punta Indio	Punta Indio	107	66.48	1	Camino Viejo to (west)	Camino Viejo to Verónica (west)
Punta Indio	Punta Indio	142	88.23	1	to (north)	R2 to Gutiérrez
Castelli	Cerro de la Gloria	195	121.16	1	to Av. Costanera Alte. Brown (north)	R41 to Baradero (north)
Tordillo	Paraje Crotto	225	139.80	1	to (west)	R63 to Dolores (west)
Tordillo	Gral. Conesa	240	149.12	–	Tollbooth	
Tordillo	Gral. Conesa	256	159.07	1	to (south)	R56 to Gral. Madariaga (south)
General Lavalle	Gral. Lavalle	290	180.19	2	Av. Mitre to Gral. Lavalle (north–south)	
La Costa	San Clemente del Tuyú	308	191.38	1	Av. Talas del Tuyú to the town (east)	
La Costa	Las Toninas	319	198.21	1	Av. 26 to the town (east)	
La Costa	Santa Teresita	324	201.32	1	Av. 32 to the town (east)	
La Costa	Mar del Tuyú	328	203.81	1	Av. 58 to the town (east)	
La Costa	Costa del Este	333	206.91	1	Av. 4 to the town (east)	
La Costa	Aguas Verdes	336	208.78	1	Av. Fragata Sarmiento to the town (east)	
La Costa	La Lucila del Mar	339	210.64	1	Salta street to the town (east)	
La Costa	San Bernardo	341	211.88	1	Av. San Bernardo to the town (east)	
La Costa	Mar de Ajó	345	214.37	1	Av. del Libertador San Martín to the town (east)	
La Costa	Nueva Atlantis	350	217.48	1	Av. Roldán to the town (east)	
La Costa	Punta Médanos	364	226.17	2	Unnamed road to beach (east) – unknown road (west)	
La Costa	Costa Esmeralda	380	236.12	1	Unnamed road to the town	North access
La Costa	Costa Esmeralda	382	237.36	1	Unnamed road to the town	South access
Pinamar	Pinamar	393	244.19	2	to (west); Av. Jorge Bunge to the town (east)	R74 to Benito Juárez (west)
Pinamar	Ostende	396	246.06	1	Victor Hugo street to the town (east)	
Pinamar	Valeria del Mar	398	247.30	1	Av. Espora to the town (east)	
Pinamar	Cariló	400	248.54	1	Unnamed road to the town	
Villa Gesell	Villa Gesell	411	255.38	1	Av. Buenos Aires to the town (east)	North access
Villa Gesell	Villa Gesell	416	258.49	1	Unnamed avenue to the town (east)	South access
Villa Gesell	Mar de las Pampas	420	260.97	1	Unnamed road to the town (east)	
Villa Gesell	Mar Azul	423	262.84	1	A. Morango street to the town (east)	
Mar Chiquita	Mar Chiquita	483	300.12	–	Tollbooth	
Mar Chiquita	Mar Chiquita	483	300.12	1	Av. San Martín to the town (east)	
Mar Chiquita	Mar de Cobo	487	302.60	1	Av. Manuel Cobo to the town (east)	
Mar Chiquita	La Caleta	489	303.85	1	Av. del Parque to the town (east)	
Mar Chiquita	Camet Norte	494	306.95	1	Av. San Martín to the town (east)	
Mar Chiquita	Santa Clara del Mar	496	308.2	1	Av. Montecarlo to the town (east)	North access
Mar Chiquita	Santa Clara del Mar	498	309.44	1	Av. Montreal to the town (east)	South access
Mar Chiquita	Atlántida	500	310.68	2	Av. Génova (west) to – Av. Acapulco (east) to the town	
General Pueyrredón	Mar del Plata	514	319.38	1	Constitución Ave. to the city (west)	
General Pueyrredón	Mar del Plata	518	321.87	1	Av. Colón to the city (west)	
General Pueyrredón	Mar del Plata	528	328.08	1	Av. J.B. Justo to the city (west)	
General Alvarado	Miramar	562	349.21	1	to (west)	R77 to Yraizos town
