= Gesell =

Gesell may refer to:

- Villa Gesell Partido, Argentina
- Villa Gesell, a capital city of Villa Gesell Partido
  - Asociación Deportiva Atlético Villa Gesell, a soccer team founded there
  - Villa Gesell Airport
- Gesell Institute, a non-profit organization named after Arnold Gesell
- Gesell Developmental Schedules, metrics for the development of young children by Arnold Gesell

== People with the surname ==
- Arnold Gesell (1880–1961), American psychologist and pediatrician
- Carl Eduard Gesell (1845–1894), German organ builder
- Carlos Idaho Gesell (1891–1879), Argentinian businessman, founder of Villa Gesell, son of Silvio
- Claudia Gesell (born 1977), German middle-distance runner
- Gerhard Gesell (1910–1993), American federal judge
- Kurt Gesell (born 1941), Canadian politician
- Silvio Gesell (1862–1930), German entrepreneur, economist, and founder of Freiwirtschaft economic model
- William H. Gesell (1890–1956), American engineer and business executive

== See also ==
- Gsell
