= Cariló =

- Town
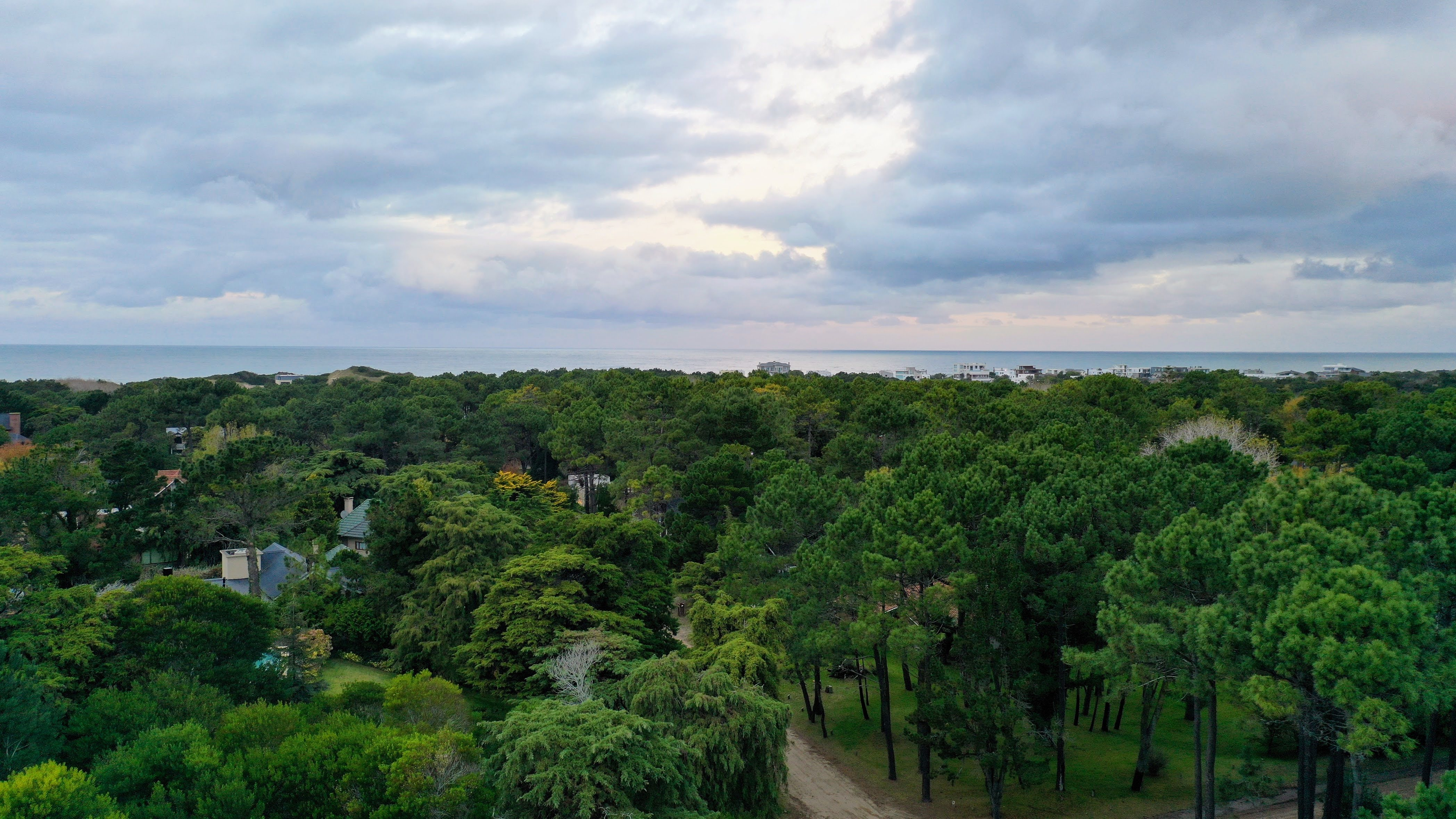
- Cariló from above, with houses embedded in dense forest

- Location in Argentina
- Coordinates: 37°10′00″S 56°53′59″W
- Country: Argentina
- Province: Buenos Aires
- Partido: Pinamar
- Founded: December 3, 1918

Government
  - Intendant: Juan Ibarguren (PRO)

Area
  - Total: 17 km^{2} (6.6 sq mi)
- Elevation: 1 m (3.3 ft)

Population (2001 census [INDEC])
  - Total: 1,553
- Demonym: carilense
- Time zone: UTC−3 (ART)
- CPA base: 7176
- Area code: +54 2254

Cariló (from the Mapuche word meaning "Green Dune") is a beach resort town of the Atlantic Coast located in Pinamar Partido, Buenos Aires Province, Argentina, approximately 360 km (224 miles) south of Buenos Aires city. It is a nature reserve of forest, dunes and beach with an extension of 5 km of seafront and, on average, 4 km from the Argentine Sea to the Route 11, which separates it from the party of General Madariaga. It lies between the towns of Valeria del Mar, Pinamar and Villa Gesell along the Atlantic Ocean.

Established through a forestation project in the early 20th century by Héctor Manuel Guerrero, Cariló is characterized by dense pine forests and sand dunes. Local regulations protect the forest by limiting tree removal and requiring replanting. The town's roads consist exclusively of sandy trails, without asphalt or concrete.

Cariló's architecture includes individually designed homes, hotels, and various accommodations, commonly built among existing trees, preserving the natural forest setting.

Seasonal variations significantly affect Cariló's population, with peak tourist activity during summer. Recreational activities include hiking, cycling, horseback riding, golf, surfing, birdwatching, dune driving (4x4 vehicles, ATVs, dirt bikes), and tennis. The town center offers amenities such as restaurants, cafés, shops, wellness services, and an annual car exhibition.

== Urban planning ==
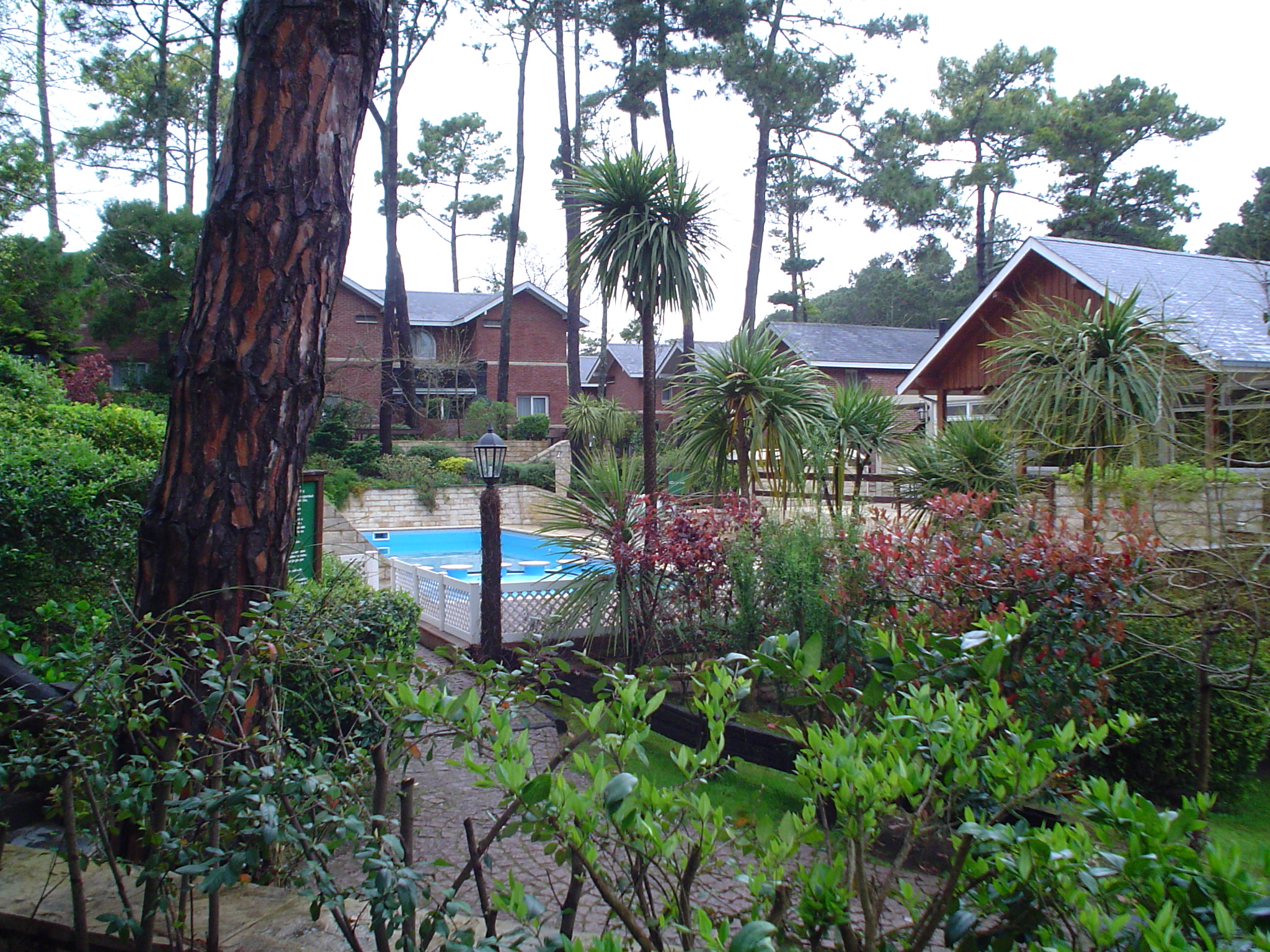
Typical villas of Cariló, influenced German.

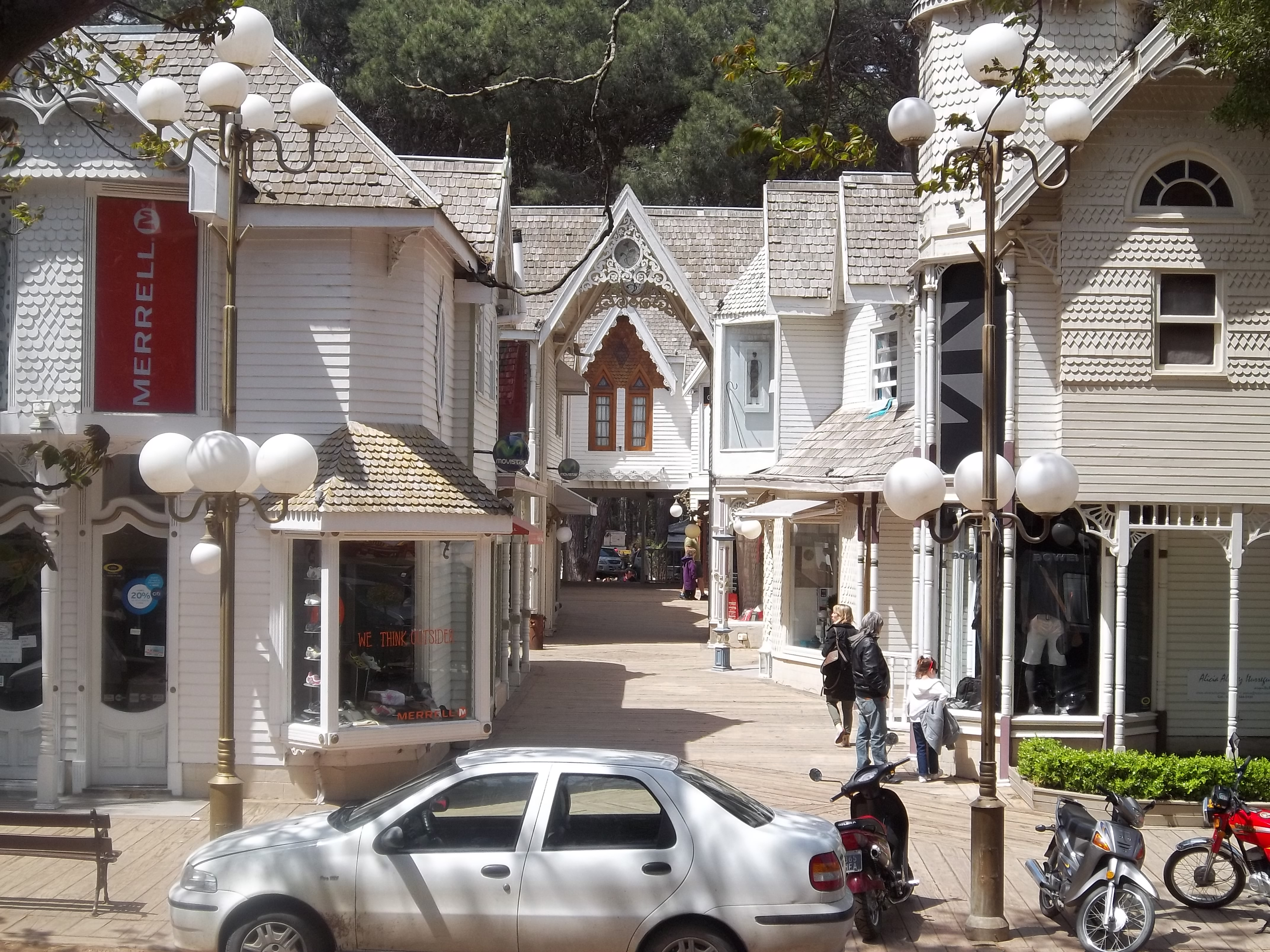
Cariló shopping centre.

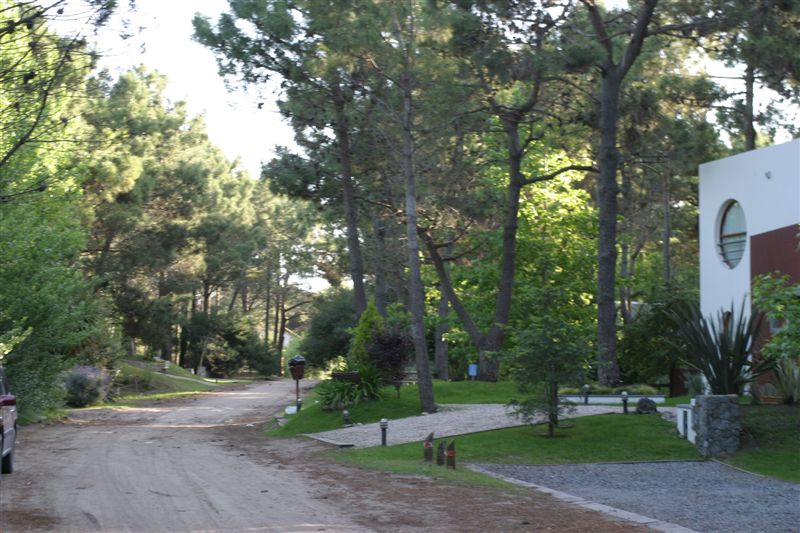
Calle de Cariló.

In 2012 Cariló Park already had 52 hotels and apparts of different levels. On its wide beaches, only three spas and a parador were allowed to be installed, thus preserving the "wild" and virgin appearance of dunes, beach and sea.

The unlotted reserve has been divided among its owners (the founder's family) and each of the groups has presented a subdivision project to continue urbanising the town. In agreement with the owners and the Municipality, a COU (Urban Planning Code) has been agreed by which it is established that the lots have generous proportions and the free construction spaces in them are also, in order to ensure a low building density and avoid the excessive deterioration of the forest.

Cariló Park is one of the most important tourist attractions in the country and one of the privileged places to live.

The Cariló Friends Forum is an NGO that works on the development of measures that allow the preservation of the flora and fauna of the place. Among its objectives are: to develop and promote cultural, artistic, educational and sports activities aimed at improving the lifestyle in the Park; participate in all activities aimed at the analysis of public or private ventures that require the development of environmental impact studies; coordinate with other existing or future organizations, joint actions that are aimed at fulfilling the aforementioned objectives; develop an atmosphere of cordiality and solidarity among the members of the locality and aim at their intellectual and cultural improvement.

The Cariló Development Society, "SFC", aims to preserve the characteristics of the locality, defend nature, preserve fauna and flora and control building growth and uncontrolled urbanisation. The participation of as many owners as possible in the SFC ensures the fulfilment of its objectives, which will be of special and significant benefit for all.

== History ==
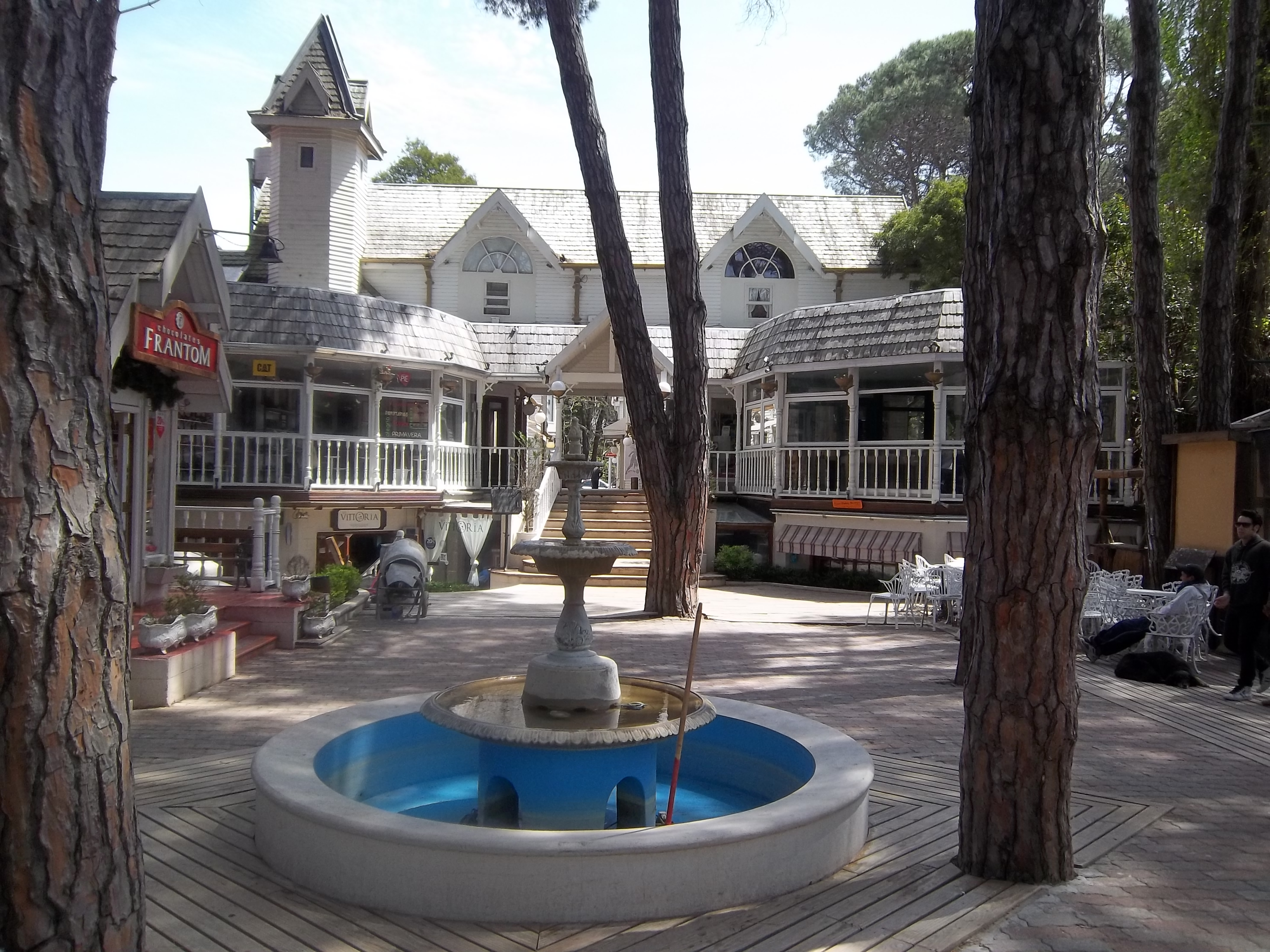
Fountain in the shopping centre of Cariló.

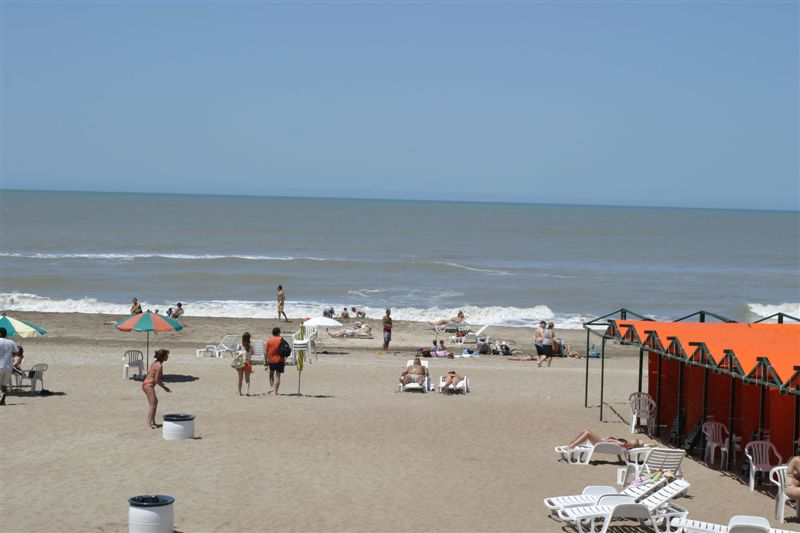
Cariló Beach.

The area now known as Cariló (cari (green), ló (médano)) was originally composed of coastal dunes with little vegetation. In the early 1920s, Héctor Manuel Guerrero began an extensive afforestation project on his estate, Dos Montes, which included 1,700 hectares of shifting sand dunes used for cattle ranching. The project faced significant challenges, including limited access, lack of transportation infrastructure, and minimal local experience with dune stabilization.

Guerrero and his team experimented with tree species and planting techniques, introducing pines and fruit trees to help fix the dunes and attract native bird species. By 1935, the afforested area was named Cariló. In 1938, the forestation nurseries were relocated from the Guerrero family’s Charles Viejo ranch to Dos Montes, and by 1947, over 660,000 trees had been prepared for planting. The estate's main residence, Divisadero (also known as Casa Grande), was built on a dune facing the Atlantic Ocean in 1948.

Forestation continued for several decades. By the 1970s, the Guerrero family had completed the transformation of the property into a mature coastal forest, and nursery operations were discontinued once the planted forest reached full development. As part of the town's urban planning, the founder’s descendants established a distinctive street naming system: streets running perpendicular to the shoreline are named after native plant and tree species, while those running parallel to the coast are named after local bird species – both sets ordered alphabetically.

On April 8, 1976, during the self-proclaimed de facto government National Reorganization Process, the general (retired) Ibérico M. Saint Jean, who belonged to the group close to the de facto president, Jorge Rafael Videla, was appointed governor of the province of Buenos Aires. On June 11, 1978, Saint Jean, with the authorisation of the military junta established by Decree Law No. 9024 the creation of four new urban municipalities: La Costa, Pinamar, Villa Gesell and Monte Hermoso, raising the number of municipalities from 121 to 125 in the Province. On July 1, 1978, three new municipalities that were called "Urban Municipality of the Coast", "Urban Municipality of Pinamar" and "Urban Municipality of Villa Gesell" began to operate independently of the territories belonging to the current parties of General Lavalle and "General Madariaga. With which the original limits are run, leading Cariló Park to belong to the Pinamar Partido and ceasing to be part of the party of General Madariaga,

In 2012, a group of neighbours and merchants from Cariló Park promoted the proposal to return to the jurisdiction of General Madariaga. Today the proposal is being treated in the legislature of the Province of Buenos Aires. Without getting any answer.

In recent years Cariló suffered a turning point with the increase in tourism, accompanied by the implementation of an urban expansion, such as the Constancia neighbourhood, the Divisadero neighbourhood, the Zorzal neighbourhood or Los Enebros.

Cariló is one of the few coastal towns in the world where a man-made forest dominates the landscape. Buildings are constructed directly among mature trees, and roads remain unpaved sandy trails. The area continues to be regulated by local ordinances that require reforestation for any removed trees.

== Tourist attractions ==
Cariló is a beach town designed primarily for tourism, with a variety of accommodations including hotels, lodges, cabins, and summer homes. It has few year-round residents, and its population increases significantly during the summer months.

Pines, aromos, and acacias surround the Cariló Park. In this town you can enjoy wide beaches that, with three spas and a parador, offer tent services and activities such as surfing by teachers for the youngest. Its restaurants remain open day and night throughout the summer and on weekends the rest of the year.

Thanks to its natural beauty, its proximity to the city of Buenos Aires and offering first-class services, this place bet on the corporate market and managed to get tourism all year round. It offers the best parlours for congresses and conventions in a unique environment facing the sea.

As for the activities that can be done, the main ones are outdoors. For example, the Air Forest, located in a shopping centre, promotes entertainment for the whole family. The routes consist of a series of circuits installed at different heights. It is a magical place with bridges, walkways, zip lines and climbers, where the little ones can create their own adventures surrounded by nature. Also, Cariló has its "Guerrero" square, where the games are made exclusively of wood.

Exhibitions, weekly craft fairs and "Concerts in the Forest" are held, a musical program that has been held for more than ten years. The concerts are held in January in the main hotels of the town and at the Club Cariló Tennis.

One of the most important sports practised is golf. The court has a series of design variables that confuse and demand. Blind shots, "doglegs" on the right and left, marked unevenness, "fairways" with landing areas of drive of varied surface and strategy, "greens" franks of very good rolling and speed, and a "woody rough" composed of the pine forest.

Its shopping centre combines rusticity and sophistication. It has more than 20 galleries, which include the main clothing and gastronomy brands. It's an unforgettable walk.

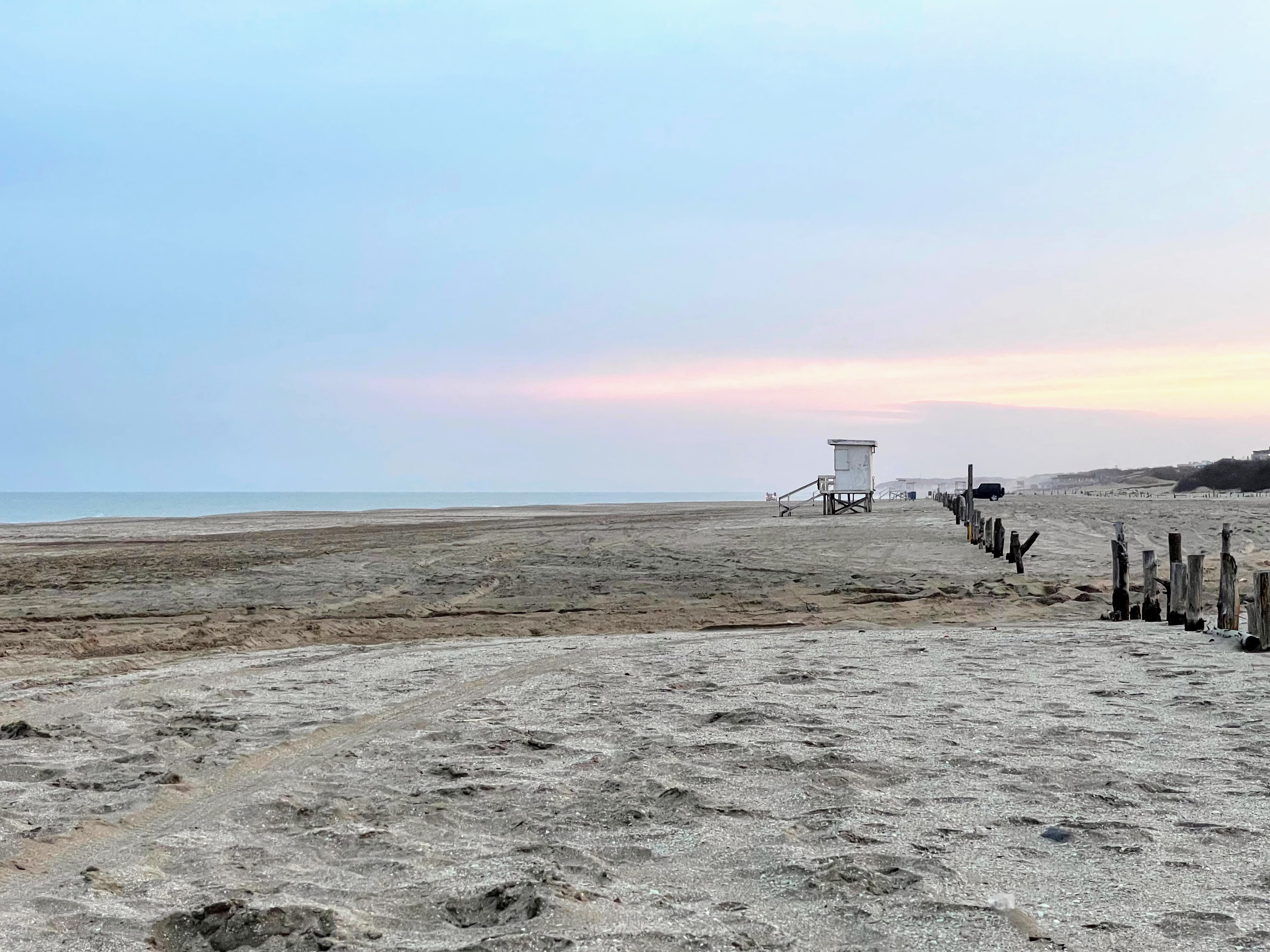
Cariló’s beaches are wide, sandy, and always offer plenty of room for setting up chairs and umbrellas. Parking for 4x4 vehicles is permitted beyond a line of wooden posts.

Beaches

Cariló’s coastline features wide sandy beaches, most of which are free and open to the public. Four sections are operated by commercial beach clubs, such as the Hemingway and Neruda. Some areas are accessible by 4x4 vehicles, allowing visitors to bring portable gazebos and seating.

Cariló has four spas:

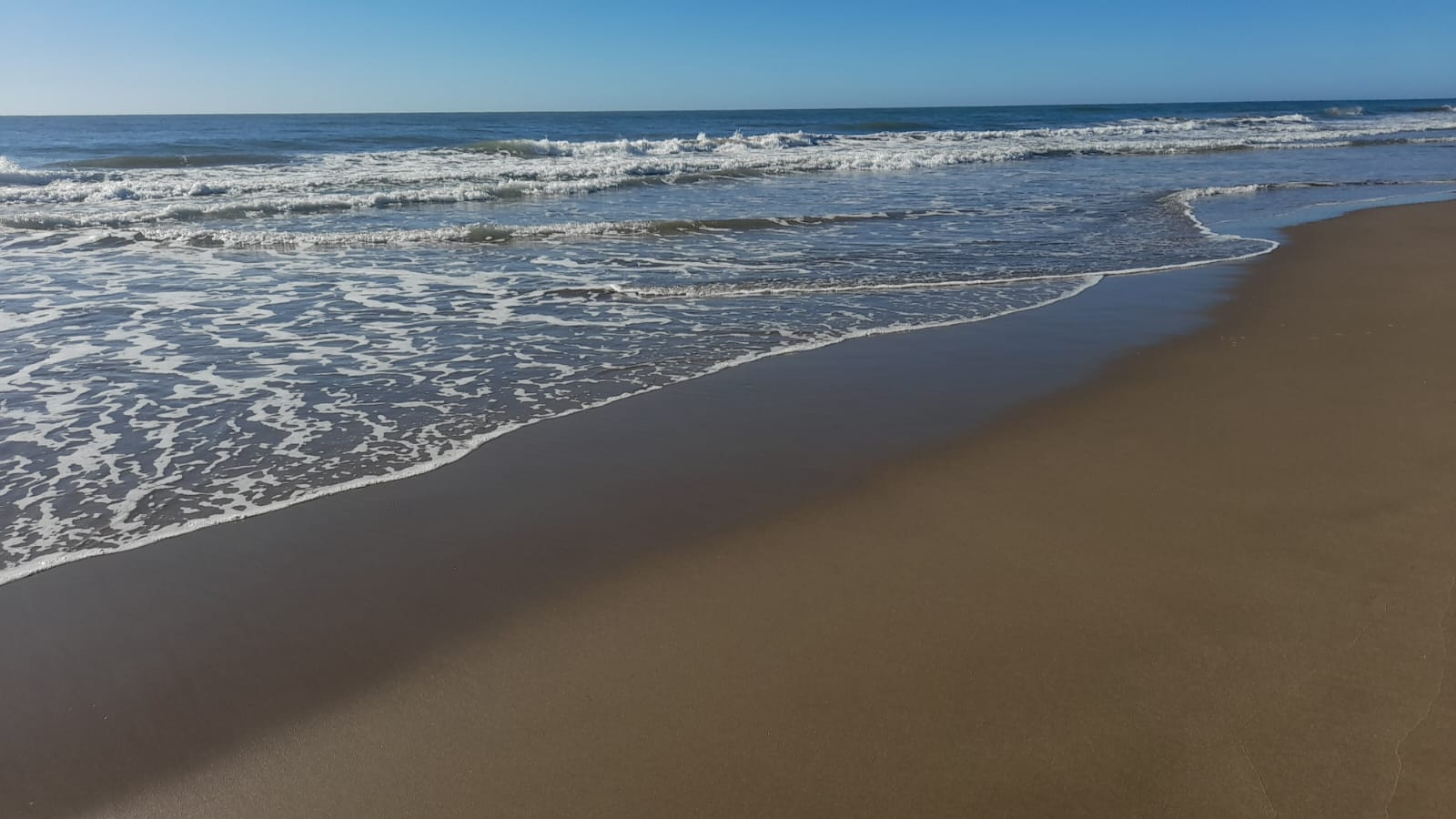
Balneario Divisadero, Cariló beach.

- Hemingway
- Parador Neruda
- Cozumel
- Divisadero

Outdoor Recreation

Cariló’s forests, dunes, and beaches host several outdoor activities:

- Many visitors explore forested streets on foot, admiring Cariló’s distinctive architecture.
- Hiking and birdwatching are supported by trails winding through the woods and dunes, while horseback riding offers another way to enjoy the landscape.
- Quad bike rentals are available for designated beach and forest routes, and off-road excursions in 4x4 vehicles are popular among adventure seekers. Fat bikes and mountain bikes can be rented, although the sandy terrain can be challenging.
- Four local surf schools, located all along the beach, provide surf lessons for enthusiasts at any skill level.

Children's Activities

Family-oriented attractions include the Bosque Aéreo (aerial forest park), which features elevated circuits, zip lines, bridges, and climbing structures. The Guerrero Plaza has a wooden playground designed for children.

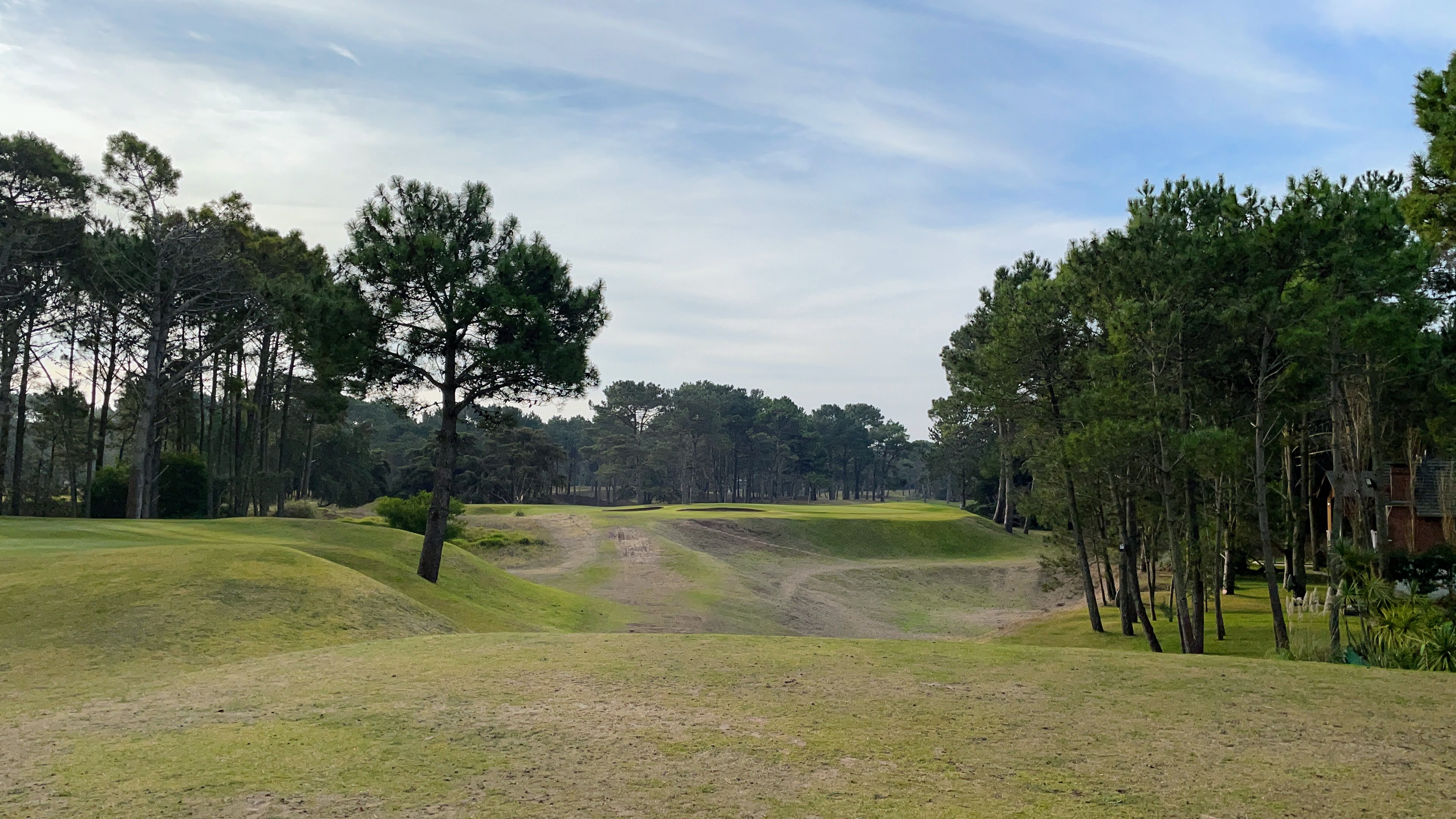
Cariló’s golf course is surrounded by dense pine forest

Sports and Fitness

Visitors can engage in golf, tennis, surfing, kitesurfing, and sport fishing. Cariló also has a gym. The Cariló Golf Club is known for its varied design, with sloped fairways, doglegs, blind shots, and pine-bordered roughs.

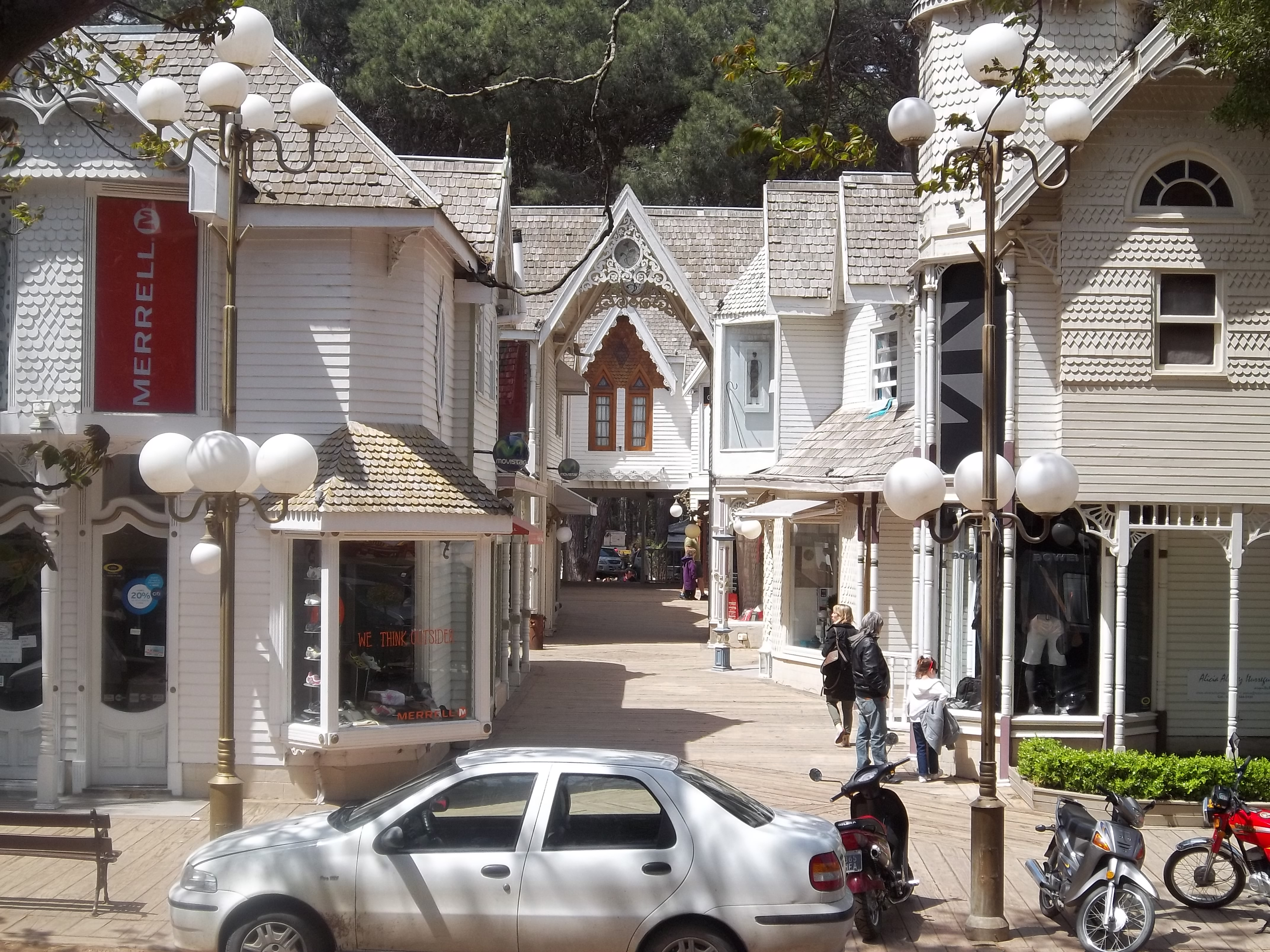
Cariló’s central shopping area

Commercial Area

The town’s commercial center includes a mix of rustic and modern shopping galleries with clothing shops, cafés, and restaurants.

Culture and Events

Cariló hosts seasonal events including concerts and an annual car exhibition. The gallery in the town center offers visual arts programming, and seasonal craft fairs (ferias artesanales) are also held.

Cariló in numbers

- Length of the beach (seafront): 3 km
- Total area: 1700 ha
- Lotted area: 600 ha
- Surface in reserve: 1100 ha
- Total number of lots: 3500
- Number of dwellings: 1760
- Number of Hotels and Apartments: 52
- Number of spas: 4
- Number of inns: 4
- Local newspapers: 1
- FM radios: 3
- Police Detachment: 1

== Forest area ==
Although the trees that grow in Cariló Park are imported from distant areas, these plants help fix the dunes and fight erosion, attract several classes of birds, are refuge for other types of animals, and also provide a very attractive green wooded landscape. Among the most common implanted species are the pines: Pinus pinea, P. pinaster, P. halepensis native to the Mediterranean, P. radiata from California, P. elliottii and P. taeda from the southeast of the USA. The last to be implanted were P. nigra from Europe and the P. patula from Mexico. One of the most common trees that has been best adapted is the Myoporum laetum from New Zealand. Eucalyptus from Australia are also found such as: Eucalyptus globulus, E. camaldulensis, E. tereticornis, E. viminalis, E. cinerea and E. sideroxylon. Less widespread species, present mainly for ornamental purposes, are: Quercus robur (oak oak), Quercus ilex (oak), Acer negundo (negundo maple), etc.

== Access ==
The town is accessed, both from Buenos Aires and from Mar del Plata, through the Route 11. From Buenos Aires you can shorten the trip by taking the Provincial Route 56, which deviates from the Provincial Route 11 at the access to General Conesa and, in the city of General Juan Madariaga, join the Provincial Route 74 that rejoins with the Provincial Route 11 at the roundabout at the entrance to Pinamar

By long-distance bus you can only get to Pinamar; from there you can go by remís or taxi. The Montemar collective service offers a local service every 15 minutes in high season and every 30 minutes in low season, this reaches passengers to Av. Divisadero and Cerezo, in the centre of Cariló Park. Another medium-distance service offered by the same company, with a frequency of 1 hour, connects the city of Madariaga with Villa Gesell, passing through Pinamar and Cariló, leaving the latter, through Cerezo Street towards Route 11.

It can also be reached by train (to Pinamar, suspended since 2011 and reopened in 2021) and by plane (the latter only in high season and to the nearby Villa Gesell Airport).

== Gallery ==
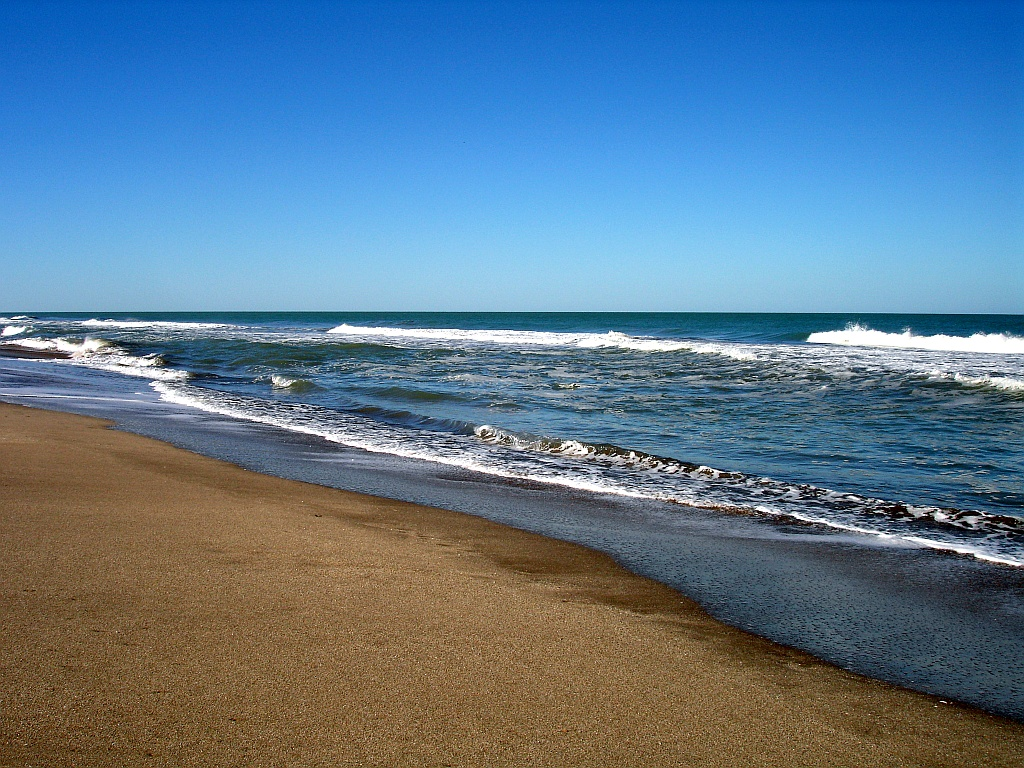
Quiet seashore

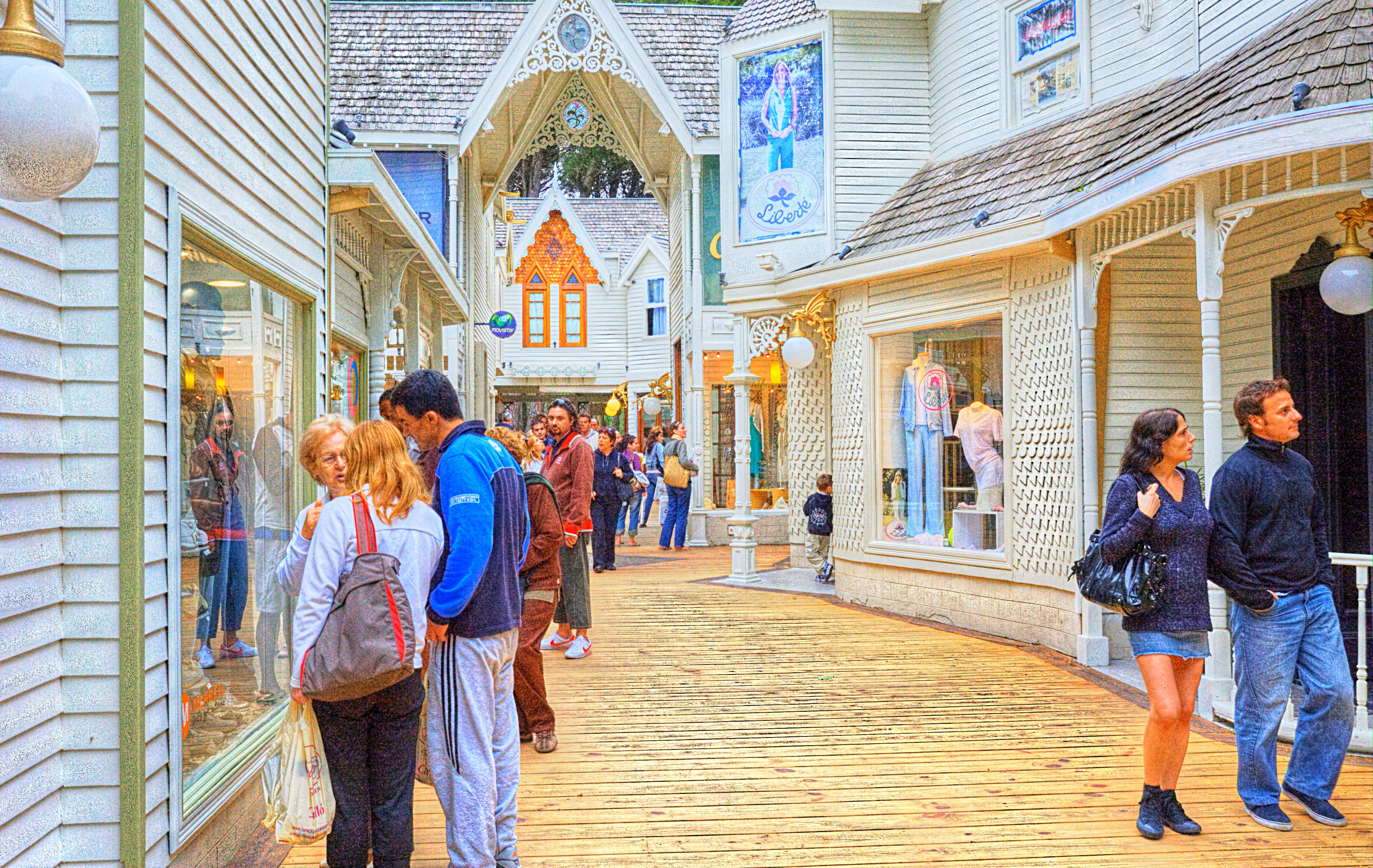
Paseo Epuyen

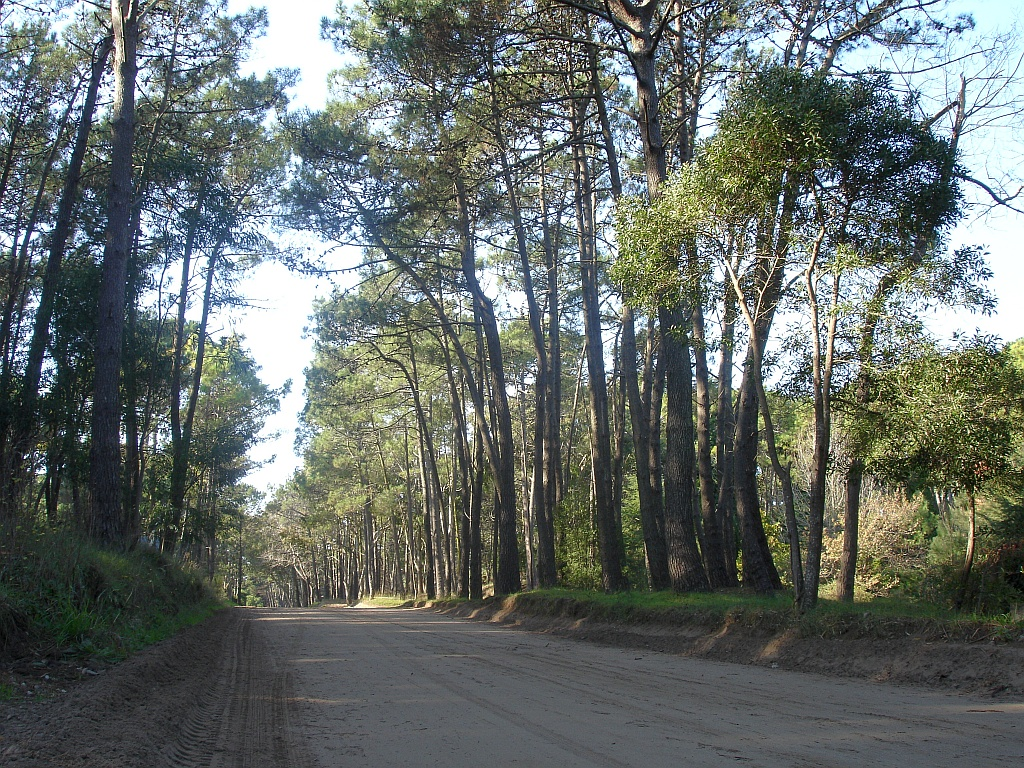
Street view

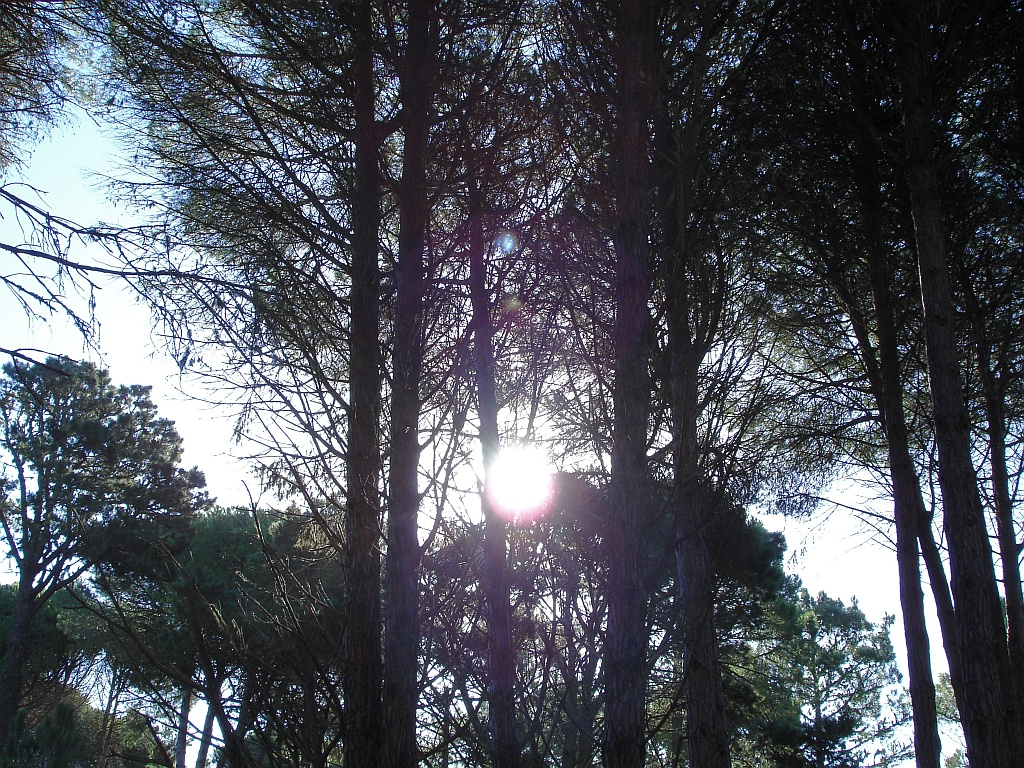
Forest view

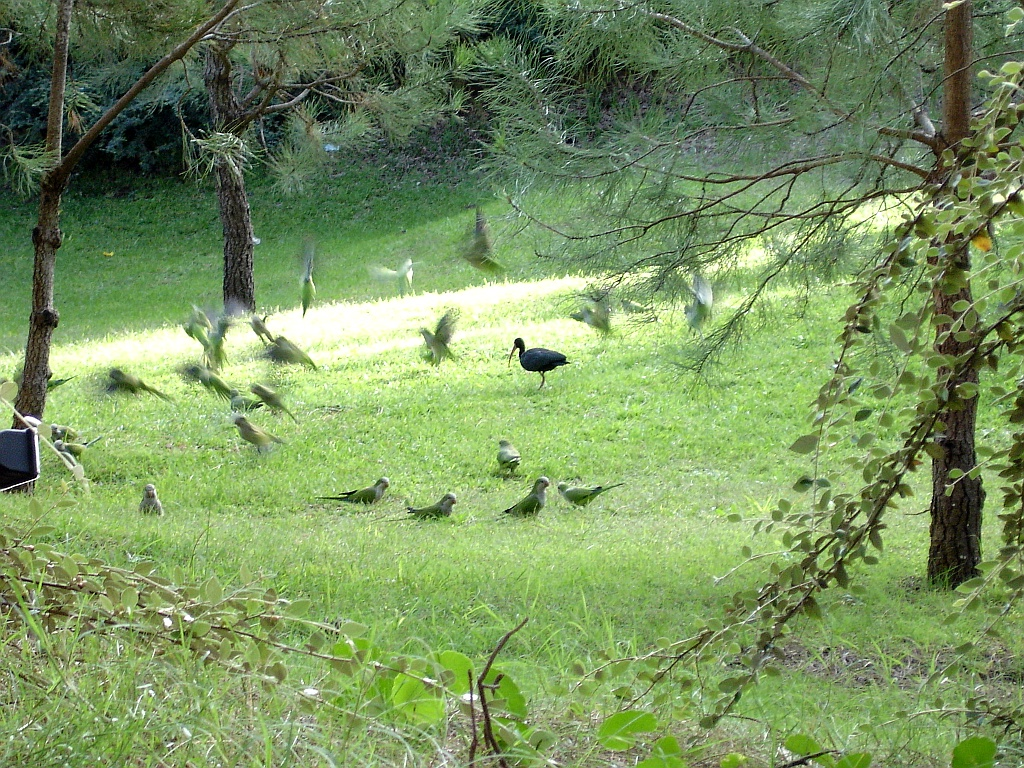
Local birds
