= Tomás Hogan =

Argentine politician

Tomas Hogan is mayor of Miramar, Buenos Aires Province. Prior to becoming mayor, Hogan was a municipal intendant.

Born in 1950, Hogan became mayor of Miramar in 1999 after a landslide election victory. In 2010, he was selected to replace Silvia Caballero in the Farm Ministry commission.

== See also ==
- General Alvarado Partido

== Sources ==
- Municipalidad de General Alvarado Retrieved: 2010-03-30. (in Spanish)
