= Mar de las Pampas =

Seaside resort in Buenos Aires Province, Argentina

Coordinates: 37°19′27″S 57°01′32″W

- Seaside resort
- Interactive map of Mar de las Pampas
- Country: Argentina
- Province: Buenos Aires Province
- Partido: Villa Gesell Partido
- Established: 1957

Mar de las Pampas is a coastal seaside resort in Villa Gesell Partido, Buenos Aires Province, Argentina. It lies on the Atlantic coast about 8 kilometres south of Villa Gesell and around 370 kilometres southeast of Buenos Aires, and is known for its pine forests, sand dunes and low-density development.

== History ==
The history of Mar de las Pampas dates to April 1957, when a group of investors — among them Manuel Rico, Antonio Vázquez and Jacobo Zceltman — bought around 300 hectares of coastal dunes with the aim of creating a new resort, inspired by earlier developments at nearby Villa Gesell, Cariló and Pinamar. The first task was to stabilise the shifting dunes through afforestation; under the direction of agronomists, large numbers of poplars, willows, pines, acacias and eucalyptus were planted. Early efforts were repeatedly set back by storms and winds before the vegetation took hold, gradually transforming the barren dunes into the wooded landscape that characterises the resort today. Urbanisation and the sale of plots advanced from around 1979–1980.

== Geography and tourism ==
Mar de las Pampas forms an almost continuous urban area with the neighbouring resort of Mar Azul, and together with Las Gaviotas they make up the resorts immediately south of Villa Gesell. It is characterised by pine forests, sandy streets and low-rise buildings, with an urban design intended to integrate development into the natural surroundings. Travel guides describe it as a quieter, forested alternative to larger nearby resorts such as Pinamar. The area lies near the Faro Querandí Municipal Nature Reserve, which protects around 5,700 hectares of dunes, grasslands and coastline to the south.

In 2026, Mar de las Pampas was selected as one of eight Argentine localities put forward to represent the country in the World Tourism Organization's Best Tourism Villages initiative, which recognises small destinations for their identity, natural heritage and sustainability.
