= Mechongué =

- Town
- Location within Buenos Aires Province
- Coordinates: 38°09′S 58°13′W
- Country: Argentina
- Province: Buenos Aires
- Partidos: General Alvarado
- Established: May 12, 1911
- Elevation: 61 m (200 ft)

Population (2001 Census)
  - Total: 1,374
- Time zone: UTC−3 (ART)
- CPA Base: B 7605
- Area code: +291 457-XXXX
- Climate: Dfc

Mechongué is a town located in the General Alvarado Partido in the province of Buenos Aires, Argentina.

== Geography ==
Mechongué is located 47 km (29 mi) from the regional capital of Miramar.

== History ==
A railway was constructed in the area that would become the town in 1911. Mechongué itself was officially established on May 12, 1911, although the town's establishment would not be recognized by the Argentine government until 1927. The town was founded by Martín de Alzaga, who wished to name the town after his daughter, Mercedes. However, since there was already an Argentine town with that name, he chose the name "Mechongué" instead. The first school was built in the town in 1925. Passenger rail service to the town ended in the 1970s. In 1975, a church, the Chapel of Our Lady of Lourdes, was completed.

== Population ==
Mechongué had a population of 1,374 as of the 2001 census.

== Economy ==
Due to its rural location, the town's economy is primarily based on agriculture and livestock. Mechongué is also a center for potato production. In recent years, the town has also seen an increase in industrial growth. A large packaging plant exists in the town alongside a poultry plant.
