= VLG =

VLG may refer to

- Flemish Region, identified by the ISO 3166 code BE-VLG
- German abbreviation for Verlag, Publisher
- Villa Gesell Airport, identified by the IATA code VLG
- Vueling, a Spanish airline, identified by the ICAO code VLG
