= Asociación Deportiva Atlético Villa Gesell =

Argentine sports club in Buenos Aires Province

Atlético Villa Gesell
- Full name: Asociación Deportiva Atlético Villa Gesell
- Nickname: Canario
- Founded: December 7, 1974
- Ground: Estadio Carlos Gesell, Av. 10 y Paseo 112, Villa Gesell
- Capacity: 6.000
- Chairman: Sebastián Nicoloso
- League: Liga Madariaguense de Fútbol
- Website: https://web.archive.org/web/20120611062415/http://www.atleticovillagesell.com.ar:80/gesell/
Home colours	Away colours

Asociación Deportiva Atlético Villa Gesell, mostly known as Atlético Villa Gesell, is an Argentine sports club from Villa Gesell, Buenos Aires Province. The stadium was named in honour of Carlos Idaho Gesell, the city's founder. The team has taken part in Liga Madariaguense tournaments since 1976. Mostly known for its football team, Atlético Villa Gesell also hosts the practise of athletics, field hockey, volleyball, and figure skating.

The club was founded on December 7, 1974, with Eduardo Castillo as its first president. In 1989, Atlético won the Liga Madariaguense tournament, which allowed it to play at the 1990 Torneo Regional. In 2011, Atlético qualified to play at Torneo Argentino C after beating El León 2–1 in the city of General Madariaga.

== Titles ==
- Liga Madariaguense de Fútbol: 5

1989, 1991, 1993, 1995, 2002
