= Gsell =

Gsell is a surname shared by:

- Alex Gsell, musician, member of German band XPQ-21
- Brad K. Gsell, President of the International Council of Christian Churches and of The Independent Board for Presbyterian Foreign Missions
- Dorothea Maria Gsell née Graff (1678–1743), German painter
- Émile Gsell (1838–1879), French photographer
- Francis Xavier Gsell OBE (1872–1960), Australian Catholic bishop
- Georg Gsell (1673–1740), Swiss Baroque painter
- Guy Gsell, member of the American children's theatre troupe Paper Bag Players
- Katharina Gsell (1707–1773), wife of Leonhard Euler, mother of Johann Euler, and daughter of Georg
- Lucien Laurent-Gsell (died 1944), French illustrator
- Maria Gsell, American high school teacher
- Paul Valentin Gsell (1870–1947), French writer and art critic
- René Gsell (1921–2000), French linguist
- Stéphane Gsell (1864–1932), French historian
- Wieland Gsell, mayor of Zellingen, Germany

== See also ==
- Gesell (disambiguation)
