= Mar Azul =

Mar Azul may refer to:

- Mar Azul, Buenos Aires Province, a village in Argentina,
- Mar Azul, a neighborhood of Pichilemu, Chile,
- Mar Azul, football team in Honduras, see Alianza de Becerra,
- Mar Azul (album), a music album by Cabo Verdean singer Cesária Évora.
