= Murder of Natalia Melmann =

2001 murder case in Argentina

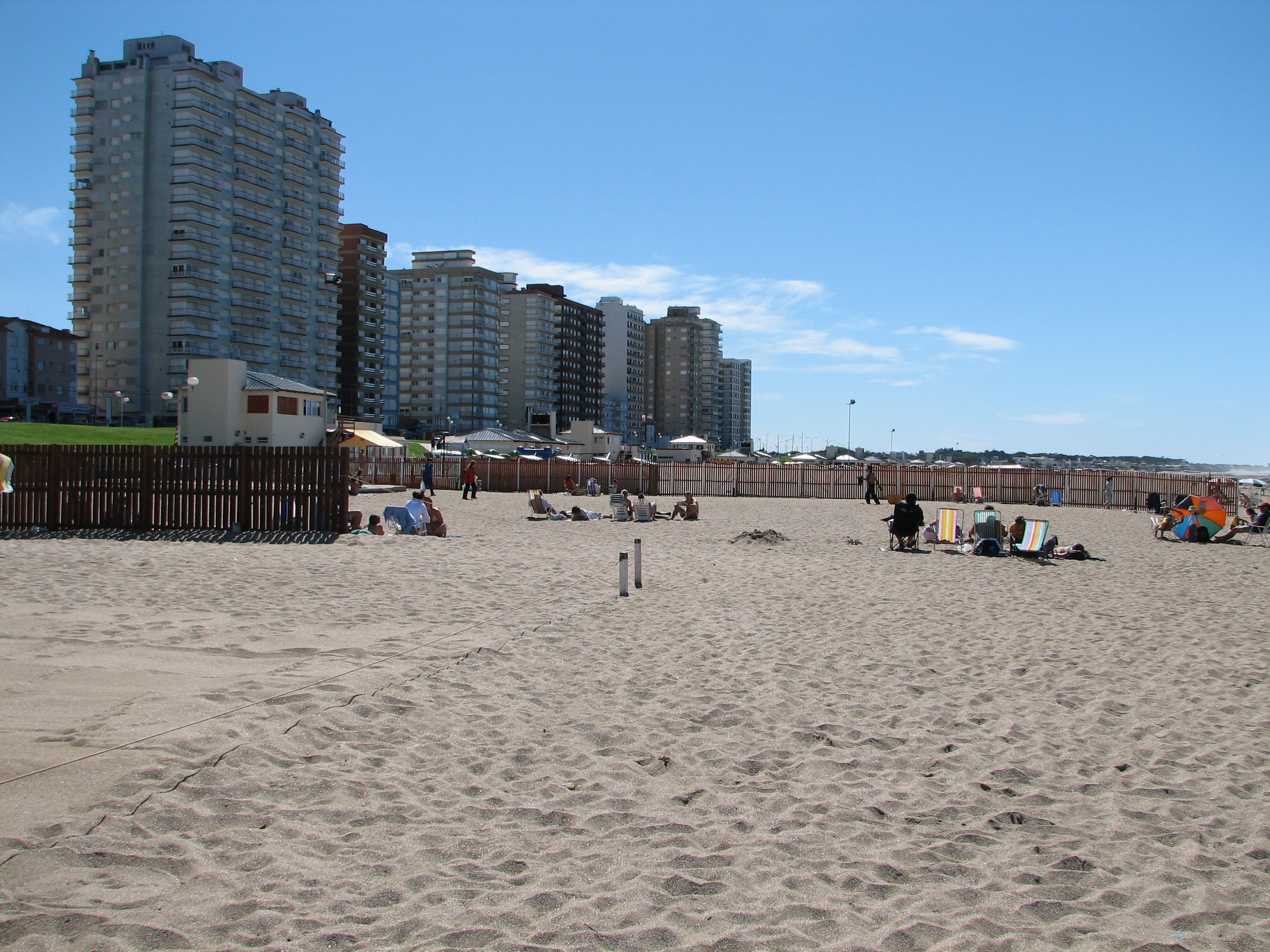
Miramar, Buenos Aires.

The murder of Natalia Mariel Melmann, a 15-year-old Argentine student, occurred on 4 February 2001, in Miramar, Buenos Aires. Five police officers were found guilty of her kidnapping, torture, rape and murder.

The brutality of the case gained national attention.

== Events ==
Gustavo Daniel “El Gallo” Fernández, a 30-year-old ex-convict with ties to Miramar police, kidnapped her. She was taken by police officers from Miramar, later named as Corporals Ricardo Alfredo Suárez, Ricardo Anselmini and First Sergeant Óscar Alberto Echenique, to a cabin on the outskirts of the city. There she would be the victim of torture, rape, and finally murdered with a shoe lace.

The discovery of the body unleashed fury in the local population. Added to the fact of which the police were involved in the case, the town reacted. 6,000 people stoned the police station, almost completely destroying the building.

== Trial ==
In September 2002, the trial against Suárez, Anselmini and Echenique began, where they were found guilty and sentenced to life imprisonment. For his part, Fernández was sentenced to 25 years in prison for the crime of kidnapping, although years were added to his sentence for another previous crime.

== Media coverage ==
In 2018, the journalist Constanza Marina Sagula made a 42-minute documentary showing the struggle of the Melmann family and friends following the murder.
