= General Lavalle =

General Lavalle Ajó
- City
- Location in Buenos Aires Province General Lavalle (Argentina)
- Coordinates: 36°23′S 56°58′W
- Country: Argentina
- Province: Buenos Aires
- Partido: General Lavalle
- Elevation: 3 m (9.8 ft)

Population (2010 census [INDEC])
  - Total: 1,827
- CPA Base: B 7103
- Area code: +54 2252

General Lavalle (also known as Ajó) is a city located in the east of the province of Buenos Aires, Argentina. It's the administrative center of the partido of General Lavalle, and the General Lavalle municipality. It has a population of 3,046 (2001 census [INDEC]. The city, partido, and municipality, are named after Juan Lavalle (1797-1841), who was a military and political figure in the early years of the Argentine state.

The city is about a two-hour drive from Buenos Aires Ministro Pistarini International Airport. On the shores of the Ajó river, which flows from the interior of the province into Samborombón Bay, it has deep-waters port close to the sea.
