= Villa Gesell =

City in Buenos Aires Province, Argentina

- City
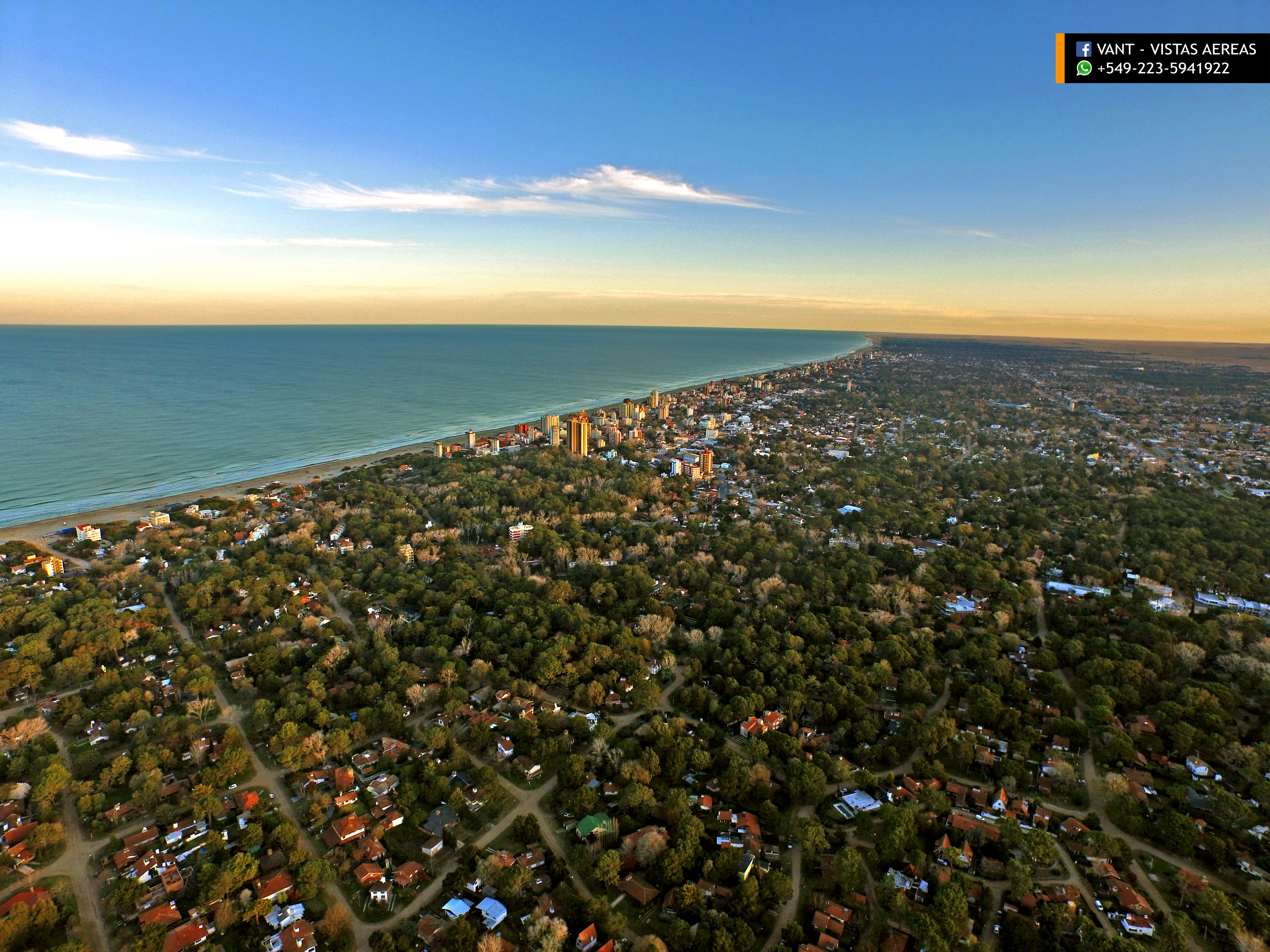
- Aerial view of Villa Gesell (2015)

- Location in Argentina
- Coordinates: 37°15′S 56°59′W
- Country: Argentina
- Province: Buenos Aires
- Partido: Villa Gesell
- Founded: 1931

Government
  - Intendant: Gustavo Barrera (FDT)
- Elevation: 1 m (3.3 ft)

Population (2010 census [INDEC])
  - Total: 31,730
- CPA Base: B 7165
- Area code: +54 2255

Villa Gesell is a seaside resort city of the Atlantic Coast, located in Villa Gesell Partido, Buenos Aires Province, Argentina. It was founded in 1931, with the intention of turning a dune field into a timber plantation. The growth of the city allowed it to annex the nearby cities of Mar de las Pampas, Las Gaviotas and Mar Azul.

== History ==
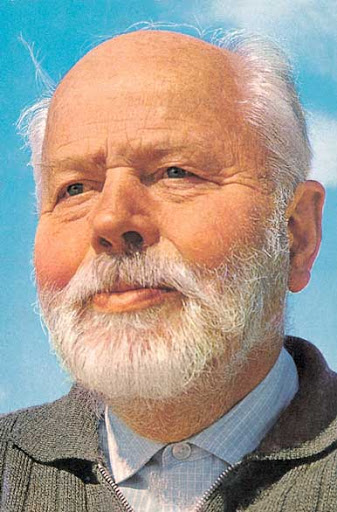
Carlos Idaho Gesell, founder of Villa Gesell

The city is named after Carlos Idaho Gesell (1891–1979), the son of German economist Silvio Gesell. Carlos Gesell bought wood at Tigre for his business, and wanted to plant pines somewhere near Mar del Plata to reduce costs. Gesell was not planning to build a city at that point. Héctor Guerrero, owner of most lands in the region, told him of 16.48 km^{2} (6.36 sq mi) of sand dunes on sale for 28,000 pesos, and Gesell bought them in 1931 when he checked for the existence of groundwater in the area. The coastline was 10 km (6.21 mi) long. He immediately began to forest the area, and built a house for himself in 1932. This house is now a municipal museum.

The forestation work did not proceed as expected: the strong saline winds moved the sand and harmed the plants, exposing and drying their roots. Gesell hired German agronomist Carlos Bodesheim in 1934, who could not find a solution. He then implemented two new ideas. First, he planted a high number of beneficial weeds, capable of surviving in the dunes, in order to anchor the sand in place. He planted trees with tubed roots, so that the roots sought water deeper in the ground and the wind could not tear them. Losses were still high, but decreasing. In 1938 he learned about the Australian Acacia longifolia, which was well adapted to the sand and the saline winds, and increased the ratio of nitrogen fixation. The Acacia was a success, and he arranged the plants so that the Acacias protected the pines from the wind.

Carlos Gesell lived permanently in the area from 1937 on. He began to run out of money in 1940, so he built a small timeshare named "La Golondrina" (Spanish: The swallow). The first tourists were the Starks. Mr. Stark was manager of the local branch of the Siemens corporation. The Starks promoted the town back in Buenos Aires, and more tourist accommodation was built. The town was linked to Provincial Route 11 in 1943.

With new houses for tourists and the local population, the area was turned into a proper urban settlement, so Gesell began to look after the needed urban services, such as the supply of food, electric power, gasoline and a car workshop. He banned alcoholic beverages, cigarettes and any other things he deemed as a vice. He strongly opposed the establishment of a local casino, which was finally established at the nearby town of Pinamar. The city saw a large European immigration during World War II, who built the first hotels and themed restaurants. Most Italians worked as construction laborers, and most Spaniards administered the shops and hotels. Urban development grew even more in the 1960s, as people who bought land and built houses within not more than six months were refunded half of the land's original price.

The settlement gradually expanded, stretching along the coastline, and today continues to grow, incorporating three more resorts to the south, namely, Mar de las Pampas, Las Gaviotas and Mar Azul. Villa Gesell has been a popular tourist destination since the 1940s.

For many years, Villa Gesell was regarded as a tourist destination for teenagers, but in 2008 the administration sought to attract mature tourists instead. The annual "Gesell Rock" festival was replaced by family-oriented musical shows. In 2020 Fernando Báez Sosa was murdered in Villa Gesell, which gained nationwide notoriety.

== Climate ==
Villa Gesell has an oceanic climate (Cfb in Koppen Climate Classification).

Climate data for Villa Gesell (2011–2018, extremes 1942–present)
Month	Jan	Feb	Mar	Apr	May	Jun	Jul	Aug	Sep	Oct	Nov	Dec	Year
Record high °C (°F)	42.3 (108.1)	41.2 (106.2)	39.4 (102.9)	35.8 (96.4)	30.6 (87.1)	27.3 (81.1)	32.5 (90.5)	30.1 (86.2)	33.1 (91.6)	33.9 (93.0)	35.3 (95.5)	40.4 (104.7)	42.3 (108.1)
Mean daily maximum °C (°F)	27.4 (81.3)	26.5 (79.7)	25.0 (77.0)	21.1 (70.0)	17.1 (62.8)	13.8 (56.8)	13.2 (55.8)	14.3 (57.7)	16.6 (61.9)	19.8 (67.6)	22.7 (72.9)	26.1 (79.0)	20.3 (68.5)
Daily mean °C (°F)	21.6 (70.9)	21.1 (70.0)	19.7 (67.5)	15.6 (60.1)	11.8 (53.2)	8.9 (48.0)	8.1 (46.6)	8.8 (47.8)	11.1 (52.0)	14.2 (57.6)	16.9 (62.4)	20.0 (68.0)	14.8 (58.7)
Mean daily minimum °C (°F)	16.0 (60.8)	16.0 (60.8)	14.7 (58.5)	10.8 (51.4)	7.3 (45.1)	4.2 (39.6)	3.4 (38.1)	3.9 (39.0)	5.9 (42.6)	8.8 (47.8)	11.0 (51.8)	13.9 (57.0)	9.7 (49.4)
Record low °C (°F)	4.6 (40.3)	3.4 (38.1)	2.1 (35.8)	−2.8 (27.0)	−4.6 (23.7)	−6.5 (20.3)	−7.8 (18.0)	−6.9 (19.6)	−5.4 (22.3)	−2.7 (27.1)	−0.3 (31.5)	1.2 (34.2)	−7.8 (18.0)
Average precipitation mm (inches)	101.3 (3.99)	93.6 (3.69)	97.0 (3.82)	83.4 (3.28)	72.5 (2.85)	54.7 (2.15)	54.9 (2.16)	50.3 (1.98)	62.8 (2.47)	95.2 (3.75)	93.1 (3.67)	99.2 (3.91)	958.0 (37.72)

== Tourism ==
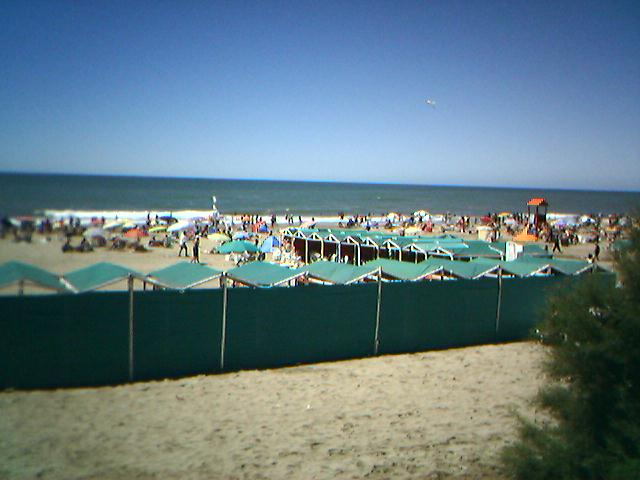
A Villa Gesell beach.

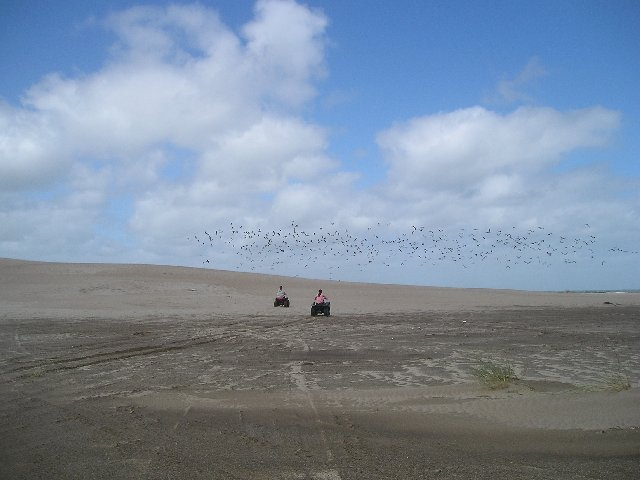
Dunes in Villa Gesell.

Being a coastal city, the main tourist attraction in Villa Gesell is the beach. The Villa Gesell beach is 10 km (6 mi) long, with a soft slope, and a variety of spas built alongside; the annexed cities of Mar de las Pampas, Las Gaviotas and Mar Azul extend the beachside to 21 km (13 mi). The city has a staff of 150 lifeguards.

There is a lighthouse 30 km (19 mi) to the south, surrounded by a forest, which is the destination of adventure tours. It is the second-highest lighthouse on the coast of Buenos Aires province, second only to the one in Bahía Blanca. The area around the lighthouse operates as a nature reserve.

The city has a zoo, a golf course, a market of crafts and many discos.

Villa Gesell and Pinamar, both tourist cities, have a regional rivalry about the type of tourist trade they cater to. Pinamar aims for wealthy Argentine tourists, while Villa Gesell aims for the middle class.

== Transportation ==
The city is served by Aeropuerto de Villa Gesell.

== Cityscape ==
Villa Gesell is built along a main avenue which runs parallel to the coastline. The architecture has a mix of styles, with buildings of different sizes, shapes and colours. The urban development at the beaches was found to be harmful to the environment, as the beach became gradually smaller each year. The city sought to reverse this effect, and as the franchises of each spa began to expire, they were not renewed. Brick and concrete buildings were demolished and replaced with smaller wooden buildings. Automobile traffic was banned next to the beach, and each beach lease was allowed a maximum of 80 tents.

== X-Men movie mistake ==
In the 2011 film X-Men: First Class, Magneto travels to Villa Gesell, Argentina (as written in the movie), but the landscape is completely altered, and instead shows what looks like Bariloche, in the Patagonia area of southern Argentina. Residents of Villa Gesell became upset over the confusion and misconception this caused, feeling that a blockbuster movie should instead show audiences around the world what Villa Gesell is really like.

== Bibliography ==
- Rosemarie Gesell (1983). Carlos I. Gesell, su vida. Villa Gesell: Martínez Salas. ISBN 950-562-751-3.
