= General Alvarado Partido =

General Alvarado Partido de General Alvarado
- Department
- location of General Alvarado Partido in Buenos Aires Province
- Coordinates: 38°09′21″S 58°01′42″W
- Country: Argentina
- Established: September 29, 1891
- Founder: Fortunato de la Plaza
- Seat: Miramar

Government
  - Intendant: Sebastián Ianantuony (PJ)

Area
  - Total: 1,599 km^{2} (617 sq mi)

Population
  - Total: 34,391
  - Density: 21.51/km^{2} (55.70/sq mi)
- Demonym: alvaradense
- Postal Code: B7607
- IFAM: BUE042
- Area Code: 02291
- Patron saint: San Andrés
- Website: www.mga.gov.ar

General Alvarado Partido is a partido on the Atlantic Coast of Buenos Aires Province in Argentina.

The provincial subdivision has a population of about 34,000 inhabitants in an area of 1,599 km^{2} (617 sq mi), and its capital city is Miramar, which is 450 km (280 mi) from Buenos Aires.

== Economy ==
Like many of the partidos on the Atlantic coast of Buenos Aires Province, the economy of General Alvarado Partido is dominated by seasonal tourism.

The vast majority of the tourists come from Gran Buenos Aires in the summer holiday season (December–February).

== Settlements ==
- Miramar
- Mar del Sur 16 km (10 mi) south of Miramar
- Comandante Nicanor Otamendi: 35 km (22 mi) north of Miramar
- Mechongué: 50 km (31 mi) northeast of Miramar
- Centinela del Mar
