= General Lavalle Partido =

General Lavalle Partido de General Lavalle
- Department
- Coat of arms

- location of General Lavalle Partido in Buenos Aires Province
- Coordinates: 36°25′S 56°57′W
- Country: Argentina
- Established: July 19, 1865
- Founder: provincial law 441
- Seat: General Lavalle

Government
  - Intendant: Nahuel Guardia (Radical Civic Union)

Area
  - Total: 2,875 km^{2} (1,110 sq mi)

Population
  - Total: 3,063
  - Density: 1.065/km^{2} (2.759/sq mi)
- Demonym: Lavallense
- Postal Code: B7103
- IFAM: BUE050
- Area Code: 02252
- Patron saint: Nuestra Señora de la Merced
- Website: www.fmriaajo.com

General Lavalle Partido is the second-easternmost partido of Buenos Aires Province in Argentina.

The provincial subdivision has a population of about 3,000 inhabitants in an area of 2,875 km^{2} (1,110 sq mi), and its capital city is General Lavalle, which is 323 km (201 mi) from Buenos Aires.

The partido is named after Juan Lavalle, who was a military and political figure in the early years of the Argentine state.

== Settlements ==
- General Lavalle
- Pavón
- Chacras de General Lavalle
