= General Conesa, Buenos Aires =

General Conesa
- Location in Argentina
- Coordinates: 36°30′S 57°19′W
- Country: Argentina
- Province: Buenos Aires
- Partido: Tordillo
- Founded: December 20, 1839
- Elevation: 1 m (3.3 ft)

Population (2001 census [INDEC])
  - Total: 1,209
- CPA Base: B 7101
- Area code: +54 2245

General Conesa is a town in Buenos Aires Province, Argentina. It is the head town of the Tordillo Partido.
