= Villa Gesell Airport =

Airport in Argentina

Villa Gesell Airport Aeropuerto de Villa Gesell
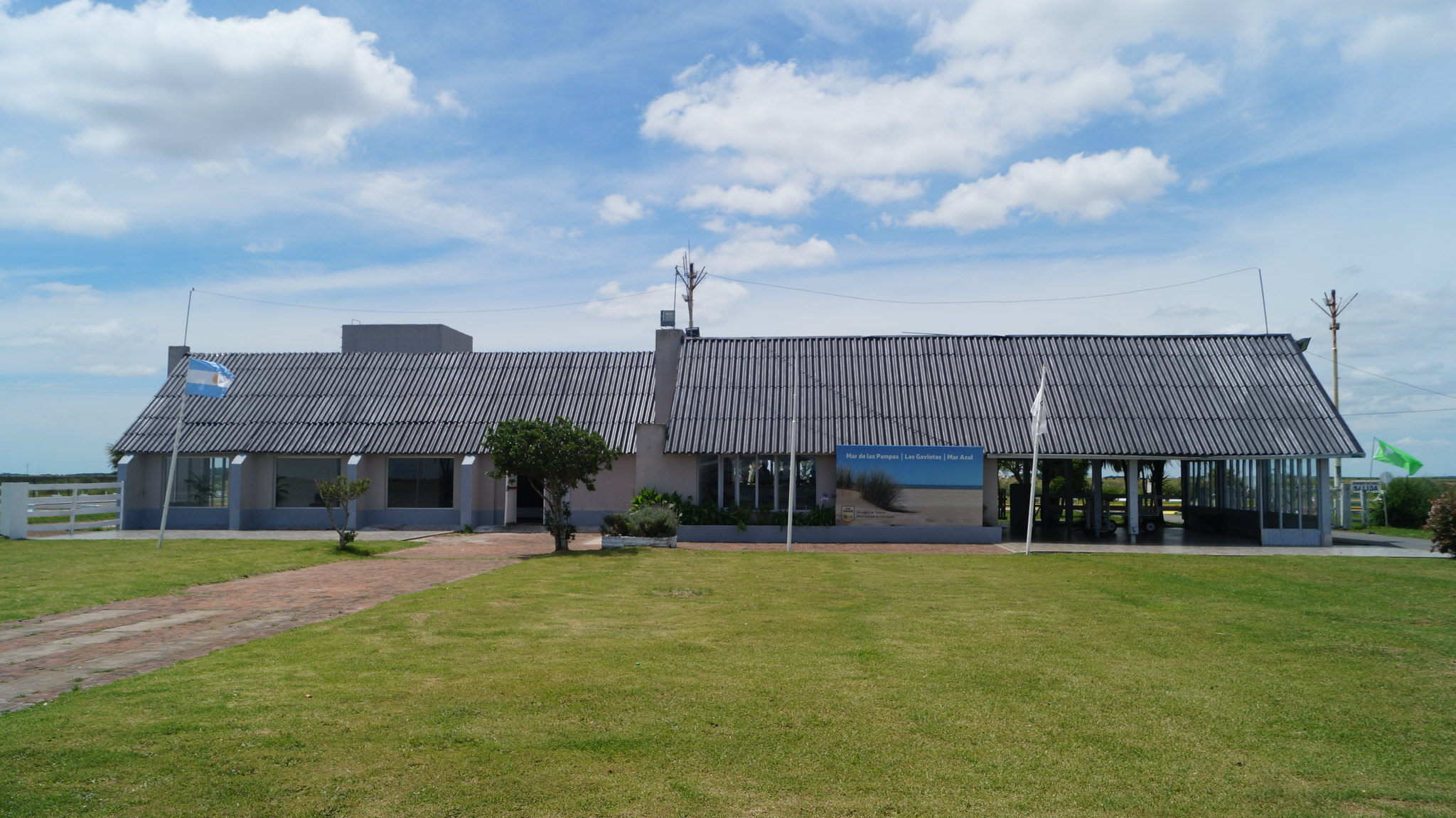
- IATA: VLG; ICAO: SAZV

Summary
- Airport type: Public
- Operator: Partido de la Costa
- Location: Villa Gesell, Argentina
- Elevation AMSL: 32 ft (9.8 m)
- Coordinates: 37°14′07″S 57°01′45″W

Map
- Location of airport in Argentina

Runways
Direction	Length		Surface
Direction	m	ft	Surface
11/29	1,815	5,955	Asphalt
- Source: ORSNA WAD GCM

Villa Gesell Airport (Spanish: Aeropuerto de Villa Gesell) (IATA: VLG, ICAO: SAZV) is an airport serving Villa Gesell, an Atlantic coastal town in the Buenos Aires Province of Argentina.

The airport is 6 kilometres (4 mi) inland from the coast. It has one paved 1,815 m (5,955 ft) long runway.

== Airlines and destinations ==
Airlines	Destinations
Humming Airways	Buenos Aires–Aeroparque

== See also ==
- Transport in Argentina
- List of airports in Argentina
