= Villa Gesell Partido =

Villa Gesell Partido de Villa Gesell
- Department

- location of Villa Gesell Partido in Buenos Aires Province
- Coordinates: 37°15′S 56°57′W
- Country: Argentina
- Established: July 1, 1978
- Founder: Carlos Idaho Gesell
- Seat: Villa Gesell

Government
  - Intendant: Gustavo Barrera (PJ)

Area
  - Total: 285 km^{2} (110 sq mi)

Population
  - Total: 24,282
  - Density: 85.2/km^{2} (221/sq mi)
- Demonym: geselina/o
- Postal Code: B7165
- IFAM: BUE132
- Area Code: 02255
- Patron saint: Inmaculada Concepción and Santiago Apóstol
- Website: http://www.villagesell.gov.ar/

Villa Gesell Partido is a partido on the Atlantic Coast of Buenos Aires Province in Argentina.

The provincial subdivision has a population of about 24,282 inhabitants in an area of 285 km^{2} (110 sq mi), and its capital city is Villa Gesell, which is around 380 km (240 mi) from Buenos Aires.

== Economy ==
The economy of Villa Gesell is dominated by the summer tourist season, which sees thousands of holidaymakers make their way to the Atlantic coast of Buenos Aires Province. The main tourist season lasts from December until February, after the end of the main holiday season most of the hotels, bars and restaurants close up, but some of the local establishments and hostels remain open all year round.

== History ==
In 1931 Don Carlos Idaho Gesell purchased 16 acres (65,000 m^{2}) of sand dunes, and over the years he planted many thousands of trees and built a home for his family. Between the 1940s and the 1970s the population of Villa Gesell swelled as hippies and free thinkers fleeing the crowded metropolis of Buenos Aires made their way to the picturesque coastal village.

In the early years of Villa Gesell, Don Carlos Gesell introduced the "Plan galopante" (galloping plan) which meant if a householder would purchase a property inside Villa Gesell, and if they built a home within a specified period of time, a percentage of the purchase price would be discounted, in time bringing in thousands of people from around the world, especially Germany and Italy and other European nations, seeking a quiet and peaceful place to live.

Around 1970, Villa Gesell gained its status as a city, and as the settlement of Villa Gesell grew in popularity, commercial interests took over, spoiling Gesell's idea of a tranquil village surrounded by nature.

As the sand dunes were bulldozed to make space for seafront bars and restaurants, the settlement of Mar Azul was established in order to reestablish Gesell's ideal of urban development in tune with nature.

Since 2004, work has been undertaken to remove many of the concrete slab seafront bars and restaurants, in order to return the coastline of Villa Gesell to the state Gesell had intended.

Villa Gesell is host to "Le Touquet", one of the largest motocross races in the world. These races are held at nearby cities from time to time.

It has been said that "there is no better place to raise a family, than Villa Gesell".

== Settlements ==
- Mar Azul
- Mar de las Pampas
- Las Gaviotas
- Villa Gesell
