= Mar Azul, Argentina =

Mar Azul
- Location in Argentina
- Coordinates: 37°15′S 56°56′W
- Country: Argentina
- Province: Buenos Aires
- Partido: Villa Gesell
- Elevation: 0 m (0 ft)

Population (2001 census [INDEC])
  - Total: 569
- CPA Base: B 7165
- Area code: +54 2255

Mar Azul is a resort town of the Atlantic Coast in Buenos Aires Province, Argentina. It is located in Villa Gesell Partido.

The settlement has a recorded population of 569 after the 2001 census, an 800% increase from 92 residents recorded after the 1991 census. Mar Azul has been annexed by the city of Villa Gesell.
