= Miramar, Buenos Aires =

City in Buenos Aires Province, Argentina

Miramar
- City
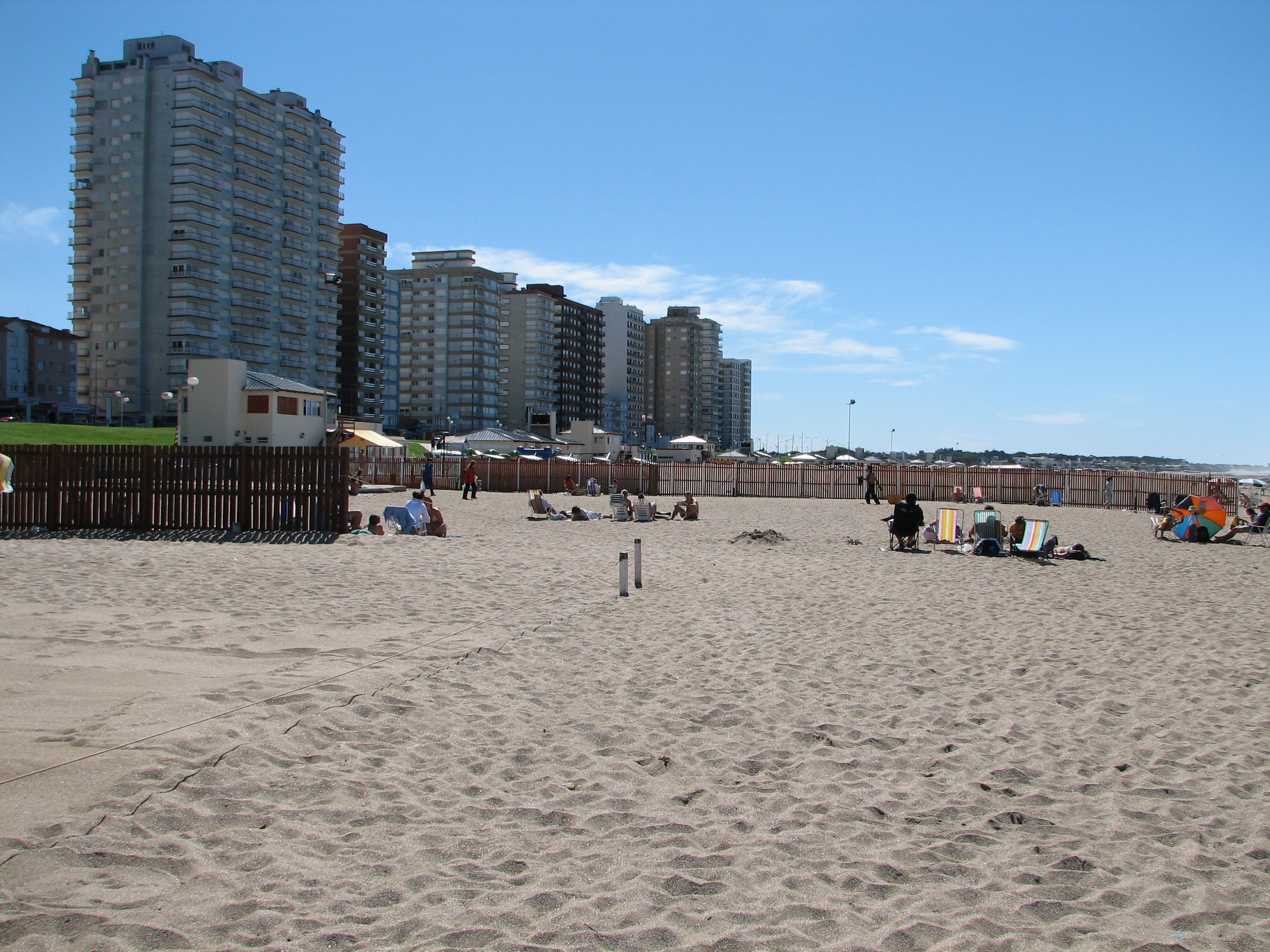
- Nickname: "The City of Children"
- Location in Argentina Location in Buenos Aires Province
- Coordinates: 38°16′S 57°50′W
- Country: Argentina
- Province: Buenos Aires
- Partido: General Alvarado
- Founded: 30 September 1888
- Elevation: 17 m (56 ft)

Population (2010 census [INDEC])
  - Total: 30,100
- CPA Base: B 7606
- Area code: +54 2291

Miramar is an Argentine city located on the coast of the Atlantic Ocean in Buenos Aires Province, 450 km (280 mi) south of Buenos Aires. It is the administrative seat of General Alvarado Partido. The name "Miramar" comes from the words mira (view) and mar (sea).

== History ==
1870: The land that now includes General Alvarado Partido came into the ownership of Fortunato de La Plaza.

1879: The area changes jurisdiction from Balcarce to General Pueyrredón.

1887: It was around this time the project to build Miramar was undertaken by Jose María Dupuy, Rómulo Otamendi (engineer) and Fortunato de la Plaza.

1888: Miramar was founded on 20 September.

1889: Construction began on the first church in Miramar.

1891: The Partido of General Alvarado was created on 29 September, with Miramar as its capital.

1911: The Buenos Aires Great Southern Railway arrived in Miramar and the company later built a comfortable hotel and adjoining golf course in the town.

1920: The first aeroplane arrives in Miramar.

1927: The Buenos Aires Great Southern Railway began the construction of the Miramar golf course.

1930: The hotel Dormy House was built adjacent to the golf course by the Buenos Aires Great Southern Railway, and later a tunnel was built to provide access to the sea from the hotel

2001: The murder of Natalia Melmann

== Economy ==
The summer tourist season provides the most significant contribution to the economy of Miramar. Other economic activities include farming and agroindustry, with most of these concentrated around the nearby village of Comandante Nicanor Otamendi.

== Attractions ==
- Miramar Golf Course.
- Museo Punta Hermengo, museum.
- Vivero Dunícola Florentino Ameghino, 5.02 km^{2} of woodland.
- Enchanted Forest or Energic Forest
- Aero Club de la ciudad de Miramar, Aerodrome.
- Autodromo Roberto Hirch de Miramar, 1.47/1.72 km motor racing venue.
- The dunes: 12 kilometres (7.5 mi) of sand beaches – South of Miramar.
- The "Médano Blanco" (white dune), one of the tallest and close to "La Totora" brook.

Other attractions include the rivers Durazno and Brusquitas, an ecological reserve and a number of beaches.
