= Comodoro Rivadavia Railway =

Railway company in Argentina (1912–1978)

Comodoro Rivadavia and Colonia Sarmiento Railway
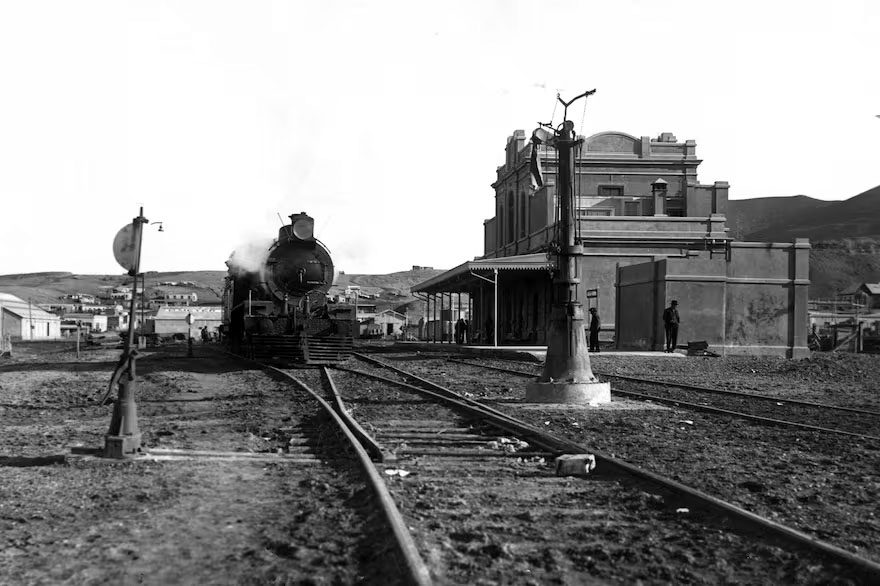
- Cdoro. Rivadavia station, c. 1940

Overview
- Native name: Ferrocarril de Comodoro Rivadavia a Colonia Sarmiento
- Status: Defunct company; rail line dismantled
- Owner: Government of Argentina
- Locale: Chubut
- Termini: Comodoro Rivadavia; Colonia Sarmiento
- Stations: 27

Service
- Type: Inter-city
- Services: 3
- Operator(s): Argentine State Railway (1912–48); Ferrocarriles Argentinos (1948–78)

History
- Opened: 1911
- Closed: 1978; 48 years ago

Technical
- Line length: 208 km (129 mi)
- Track gauge: 1,676 mm (5 ft 6 in)
Route map
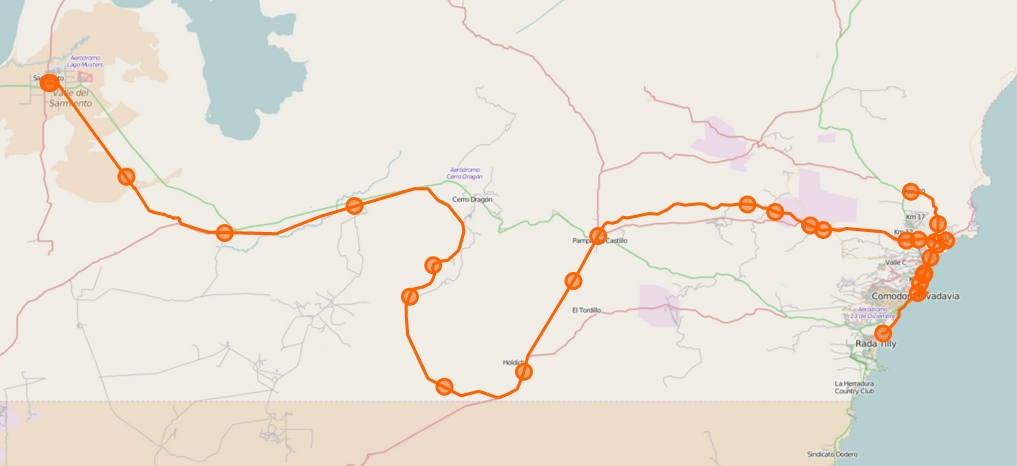

The Comodoro Rivadavia and Colonia Sarmiento Railway (Ferrocarril de Comodoro Rivadavia a Colonia Sarmiento) was an Argentine railway company that built and operated a broad gauge line that connected the port of Comodoro Rivadavia with Colonia Sarmiento in Chubut Province. The FCCRCS -belonging to Argentine State Railway- also connected to Central Chubut Railway.

This railway, also known by local inhabitants as "Autovía", was the transport that joined oil wells of the region, where local companies Astra and YPF extracted petroleum that had been discovered in Comodoro Rivadavia in 1907.

At the very beginning, goods and passengers were carried by steam locomotive trains and then by railcars, nicknamed "chanchitas" due to their lack of comfort. The FCCRCS' remnants are considered as cultural heritage in Comodoro Rivadavia and Sarmiento, where they are kept and exhibited at Railway & Port Museum and National Petroleum Museum (in Comodoro) and Regional Museum Desiderio Torres (in Sarmiento).

== History ==
=== Background ===
n 1897 Colonia Sarmiento was founded by National decree N° 12161, by request of Welsh settlers that had the intention of establishing in the valley located between Musters and Colhue Huapi lakes, which they considered fertile lands for livestock. During the first years, the transport of merchandise that the intense commercial activity of Sarmiento generated, was made with carriages to the port of Camarones, with high costs and risks. The merchants realised that a closer port would be needed, so the city of Comodoro Rivadavia was founded in 1901.

On December 13, 1907, a search for potable water ended in a discovery of petroleum in the zone, which changed plans for the development of the region so Comodoro Rivadavia became the most important city of the region.

=== Construction ===
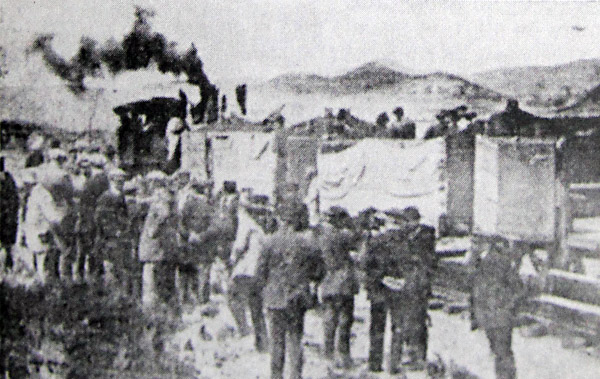
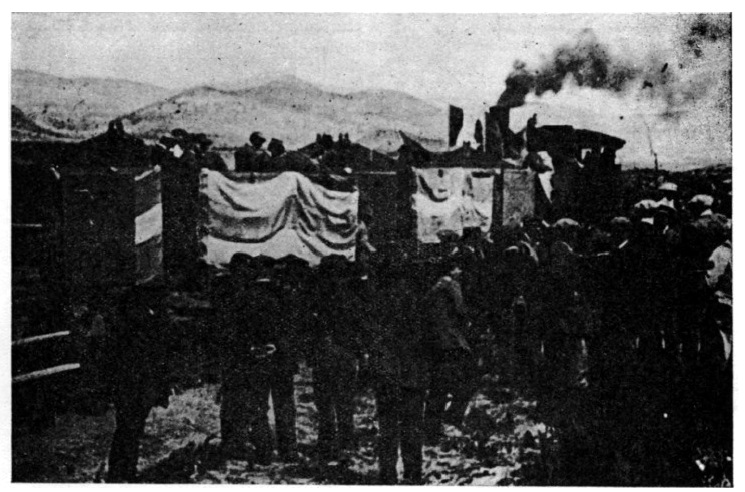
For the inaugural trip of the line, the train was decorated with flags of Argentina (1911).

The FCCRCS was created by Law N° 5559 on September 11, 1908, starting works soon after. Original project included to build a 150-km straight line to connect Comodoro Rivadavia Colonia Sarmiento although it would be extended to 200-km. In 1911 the line reached Cañadón Lagarto, beginning to operate.

The railway line finally reached Colonia Sarmiento on May 25, 1914. Years later the company built a new branch to join local oil company Astra when it established at the north of Comodoro Rivadavia. According to Clement Dumrauf, the railway was not expanded due to British settlers that were interested in preserving the Patagonia region only for sheep farming. Other version stated that livestock company "La Argentina Southern Land Company" refused to the construction of a line when they realised about the poor quality of the soil, which would be used to finance the construction.

Other reasons for the cancellation of the project were the crisis caused by World War I, some politicians that considered that the Government had to devote its funds to the Pampa region, and the death of Roque Sáenz Peña in 1914.

=== Expansion ===
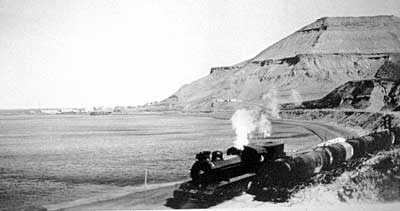
A train arriving to Km. 3, c. 1910–20

During the first years of existence, the FCCRCS trains fueled with crude oil with no refination, being considered the most expensive trains for that reason. This railway was also used to carry wood and livestock. Besides, local companies Astra and Diadema carried crude oil to the port of km. 3.

Comodoro Rivadavia had an oil refinery that worked at a capacity of 340 m^{3} (12,007 cu ft) per day, serving both lines of the railway in Chubut Province.

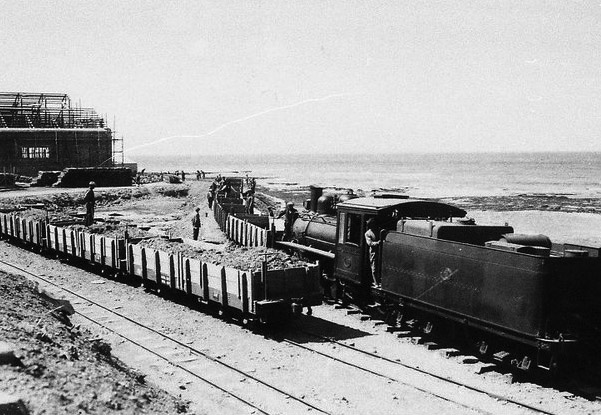
A freight train powered by a Baldwin leaving Comodoro, c. 1931

During the 1920s the branch to Astra refinery was completed, that was financed by the company due to their interests in the transport of passengers, goods, crude oil and bricks. In August 1923 the port of Antonio Morán was built. This port had an own railway line that carried soil and rubber used for construction from a quarry in Punta Piedras This line would be later named as Rada Tilly. When works were interrupted, the port was set as terminus of the line until its closure in the 1970s.

In 1924 the FCCRCS was used to transport materials for the construction of the San Jorge Lighthouse from Colonia Sarmiento to Astra station in Comodoro Rivadavia. Other companies that made their contributions were YPF (donating AR$ 25,000), Astra (bricks and lime), Compañía Forrairrilera de Petróleo (trucks).

In 1927 another project (written by deputy Guillermo Fonrouge) was proposed to extend the rail line. This project proposed to join Holdich and Las Heras stations in Santa Cruz Province through a branch that also connected with the Patagonian Railway. Nevertheless, the project would never carried out.

=== Nationalisation ===
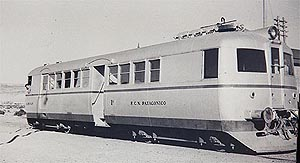
Drewry railcar serving the line

When the Juan Perón's administration nationalised all the Argentine railway network in 1948, the FCCRCS became part of Ferrocarriles Patagónicos, finally being added to Railway in 1957.

Prior to nationalisation the railway had carried 434,052 passengers and 45,969 tons of freight. However the volume of passengers and cargo carried decreased one year later, mainly due to the increasing road traffic. In spite of this, the Argentine state made significant investments for the FCCRCS, acquiring railcars (even a refrigerating coach), 13 wagons for livestock, as well as remodeling stations and building houses for the employees. By 1949 the line had run 430,828 kilometers.

At mid-1949 brand new railcars were added to the FCCRCS although they were put on service one year later. By 1973 all the passenger services were operated with railcars. With the improvements in the line, some passengers choose Sarmiento as their destination for recreational trips, and some of them even for honeymoons.

=== Decline and closure ===
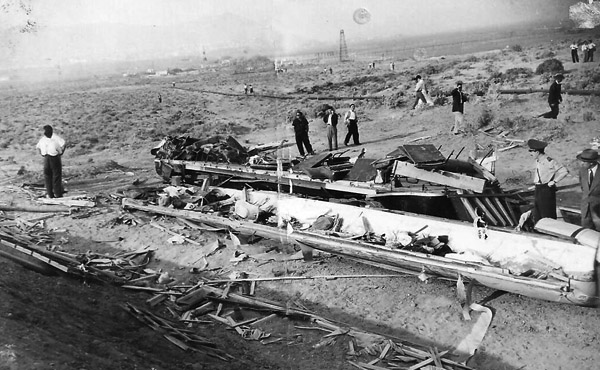
The train laying on the beach after derailing and falling in 1953

In 1953, there was a terrible accident on the narrow-gauge railway that joined Comodoro Rivadavia with Rada Tilly, with 36 people died. When Arturo Frondizi became President of Argentina in 1958 the Government carried out a plan to reduce costs, including the railway lines among them. On August 20, 1958 the branch to Rada Tilly was definitely closed, among with the Central Chubut Railway. The decision was largely based on the 1953 tragedy and the tracks were removed from the line.

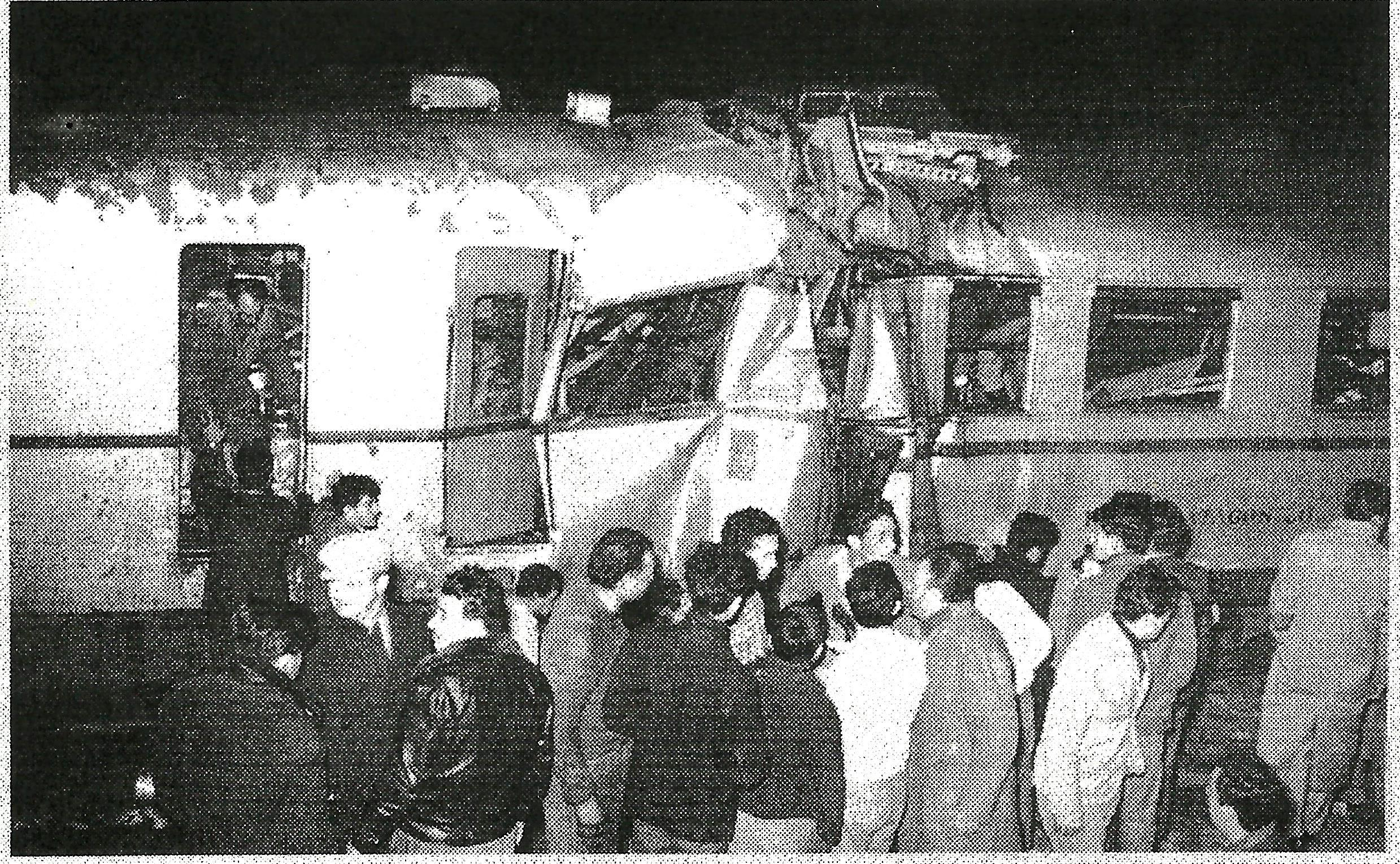
Train crash in 1960

On August 12, 1960, another accident occurred when a Ganz Works unit returning from Colonia Sarmiento lost brakes at El Sindicato, crashing a Drewry railcar that was leaving Comodoro Rivadavia at that time. Both railcars were destroyed with a result of 100 passengers injured and some killed by the impact.

In 1969 the lands were the railway line had been built were transferred to the Municipality of Comodoro Rivadavia. The tracks that crossed the downtown were removed and a stop near the port was built. During the 1970s the FCCRCS was restructured because of its deficit, obsolete rolling stock and the growth of population in the city. In 1971 the Comodoro station was closed to expedite the urban traffic, being replaced by a precarious stop near the port. The station became a heritage place.

The Sarmiento station building would become the Regional Museum "Desiderio Torres" after the first section was definitely closed in 1977. In the late 1970s the lack of investments in the railway was made felt in the rolling stock, with steam locomotives, Ganz and Drewry railcars that were obsolete by then. Moreover, only one of the three Ganz Works was operating.

The employees of the FCCRCS made their best to keep the line active, sometimes collecting missing spares from Temperley, Tolosa and Haedo workshops, after driving from the Patagonia to Greater Buenos Aires. In other cases, the employees themselves manufactured the spare parts to keep Drewry railcars running on the tracks.

In spite of the efforts made by the employers, the railway continued to decline until carrying only 5 or 6 people per trip. Besides, the freight trains only transported one or two wagons to the port, once a week. In 1977 passenger services were definitely closed. Finally the entire line was closed in 1978. The de facto government led by Jorge Videla also ordered rolling stock was destroyed and sold as scrap.

=== Gallery ===
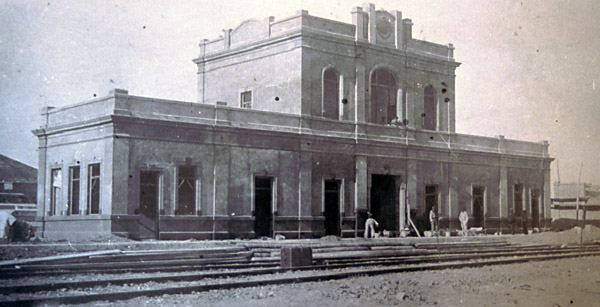
Comodoro

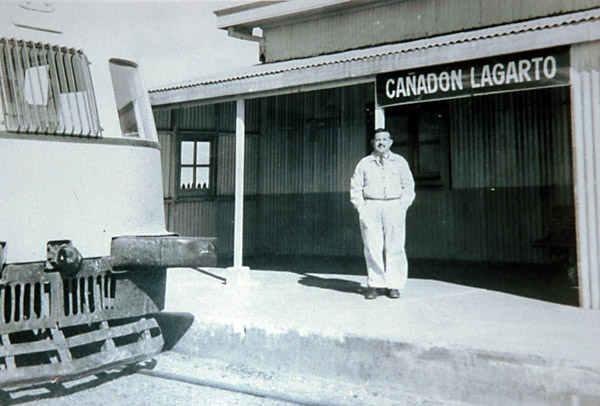
Ganz and driver in Cañadón

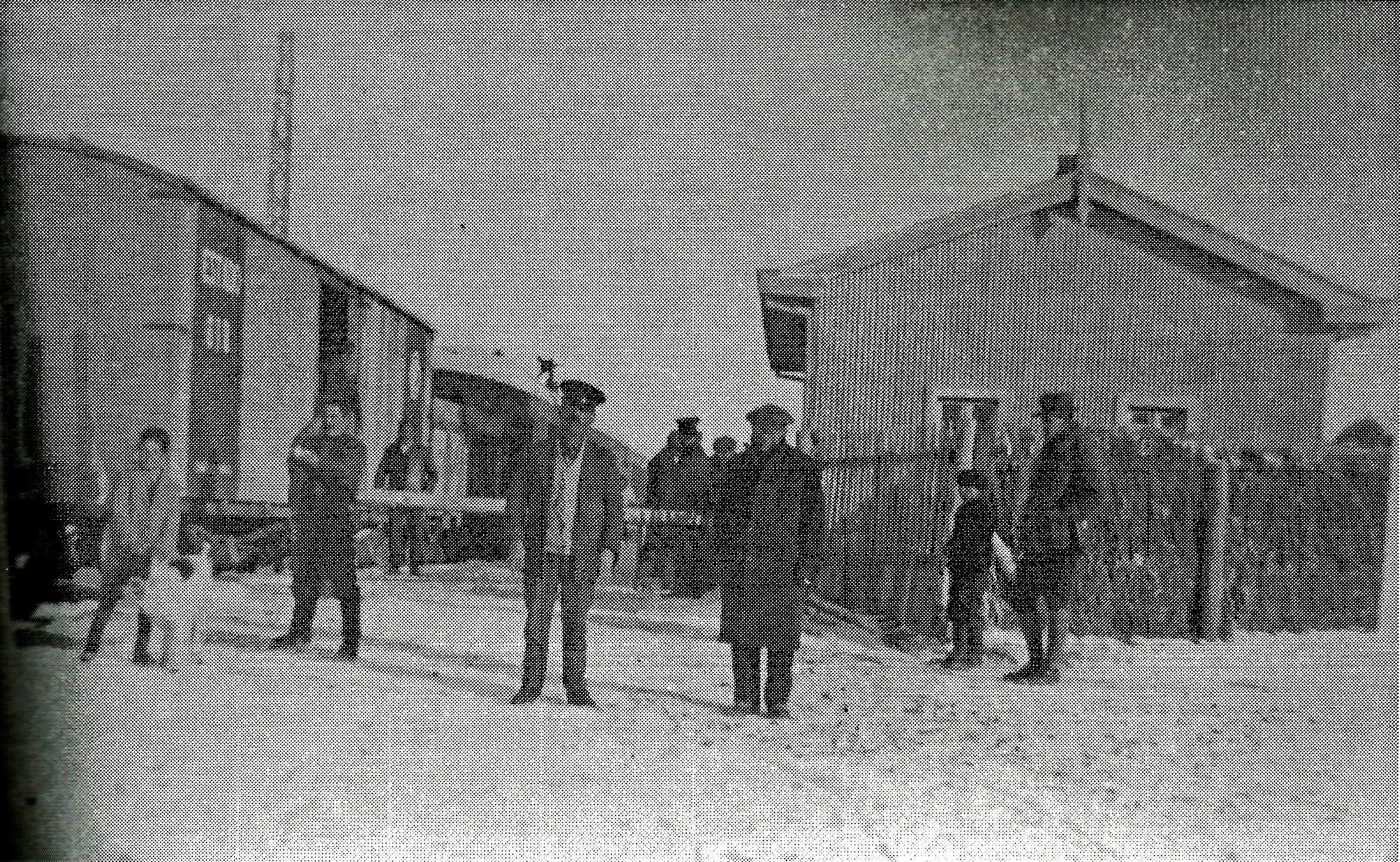
Cañadon station

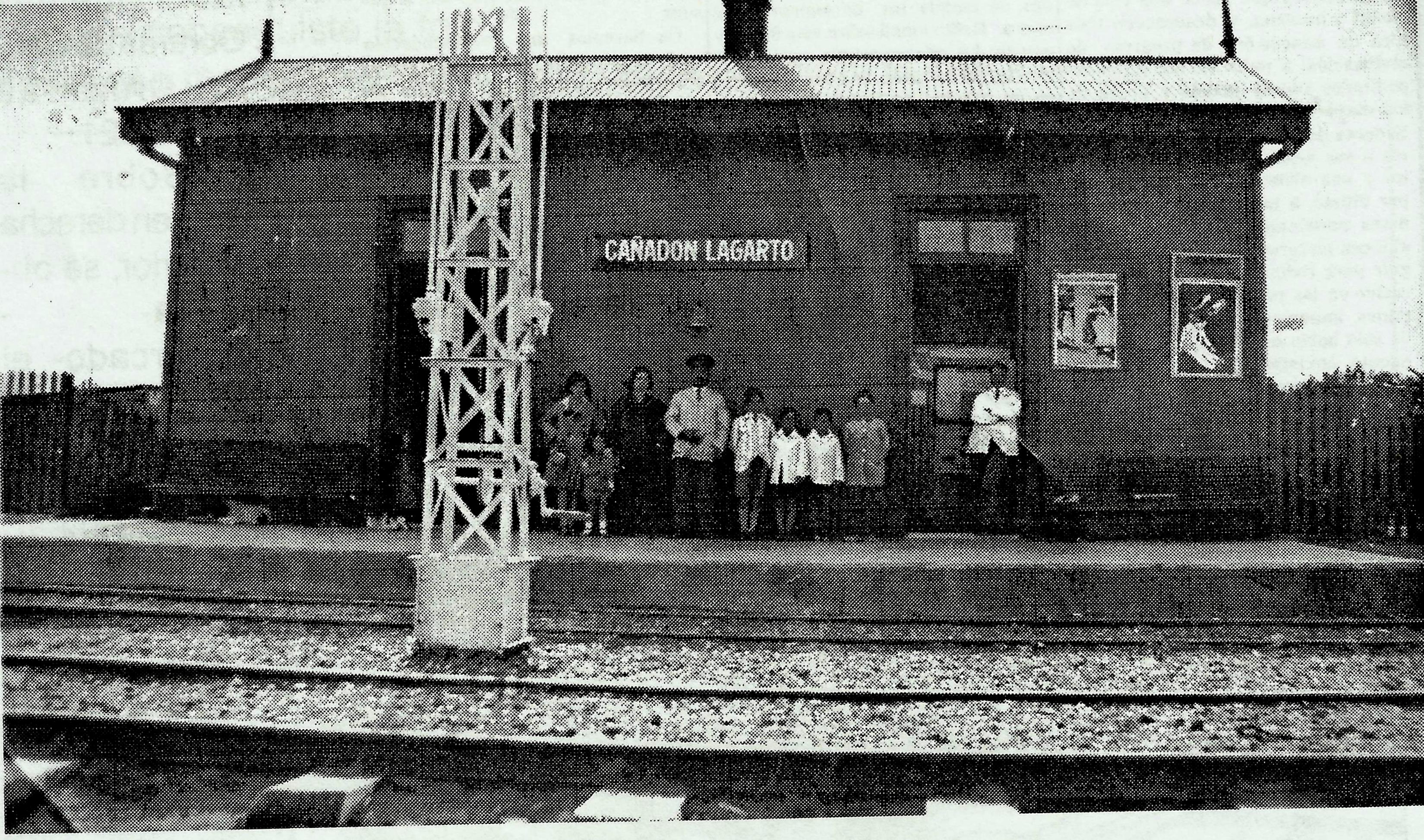
Cañadón, 1920

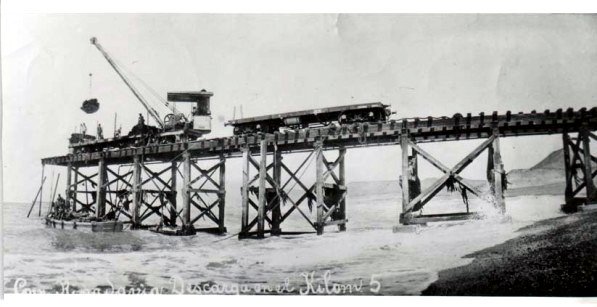
Dock, 1920

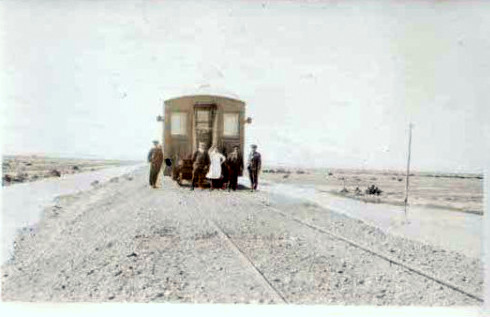
Valle Hermoso, 1920

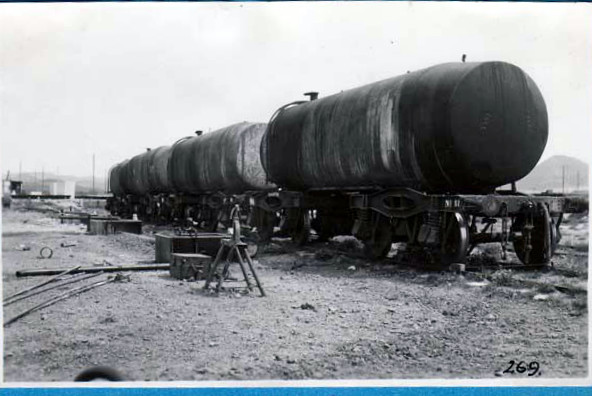
Oil wagons in Astra

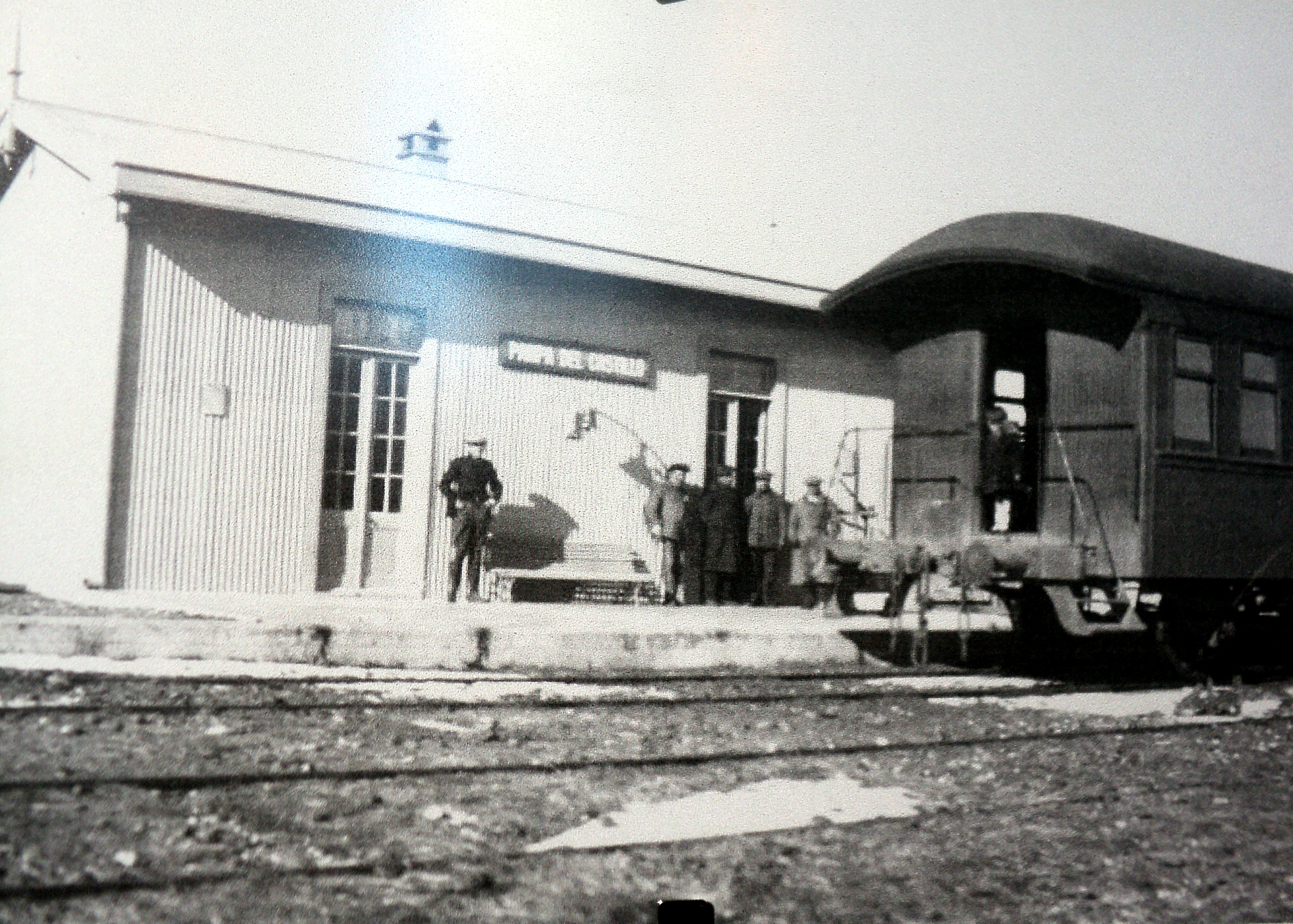
Pampa del Castillo

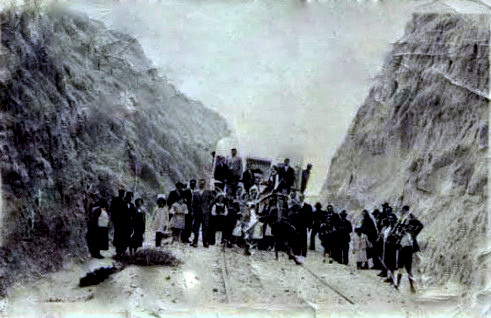
Train near Sarmiento

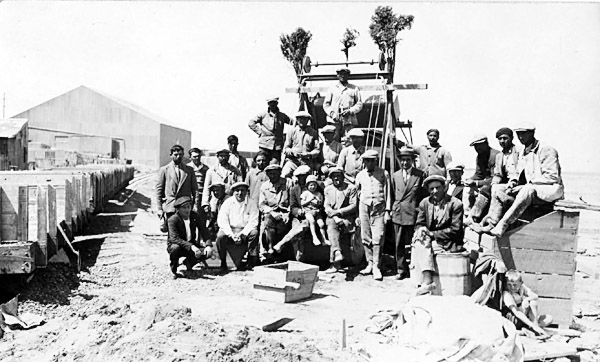
Workers in Punta Piedras, 1922

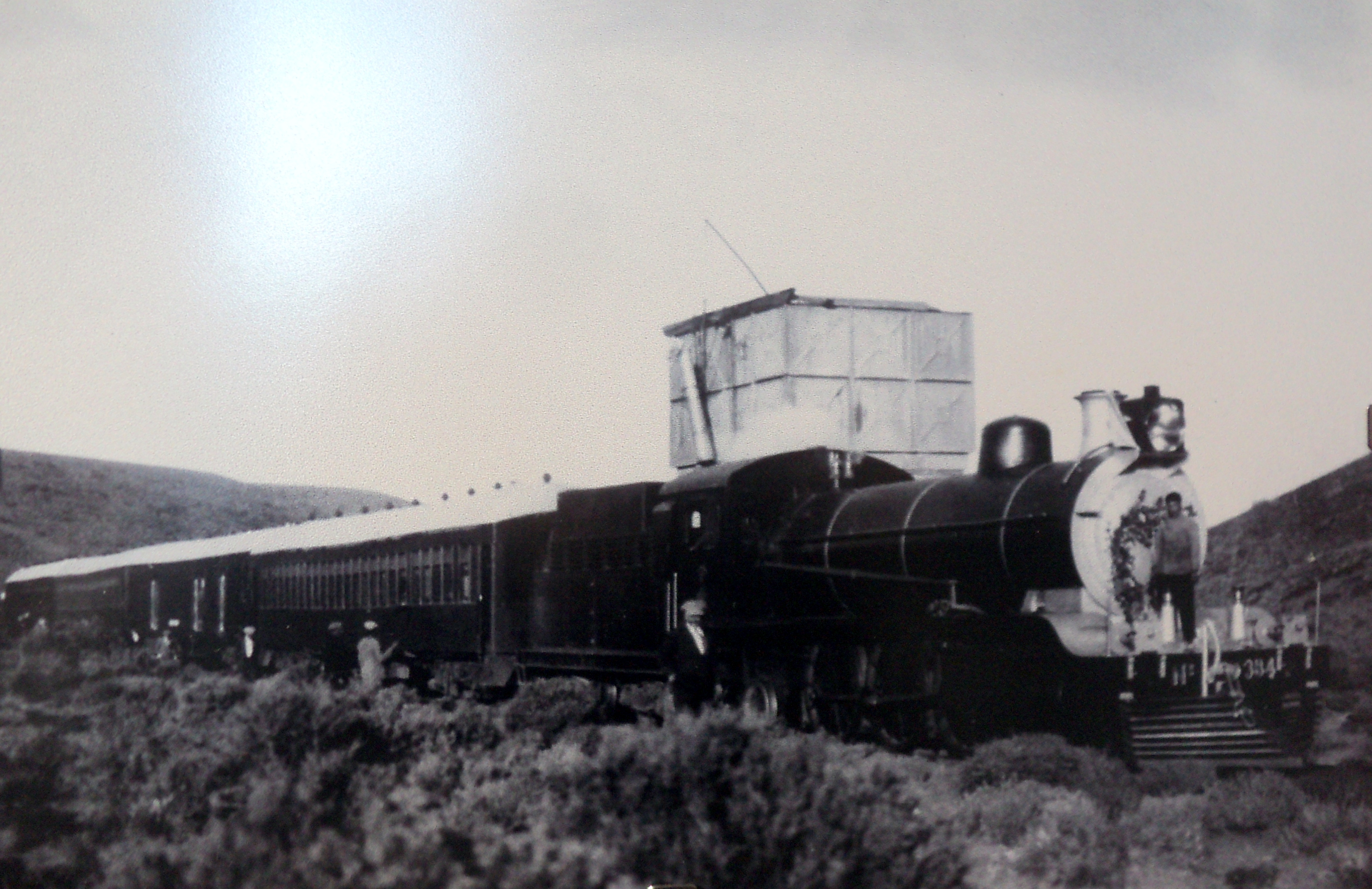
Steam locomotive at Km. 117 station

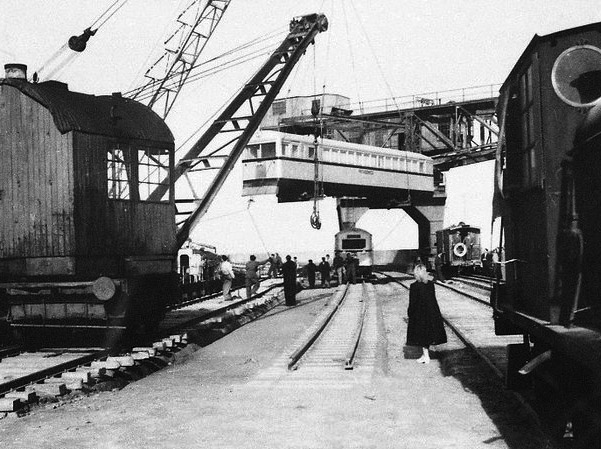
Railcars arriving

== Post-closure ==
In 1979 the railway station was declared as National heritage. Years later the Port & Railway Museum ("Museo Ferroportuario") was established there, including other adjacent buildings and objects as a locomotive, a wagon, the tower, the water tank, the warehouses (currently a cultural centre), workshops (today a school), the port and Scalabrini Ortiz and San Martín parks, the last being inaugurated in 2012.

In 1991 the Municipality of Comodoro acquired the lands where Astra had operated.

When the Government of Chubut Province decided to refurbish some railway branches by decree N° 2642, the FCCRCS was not included. By December 1992 the branch to Muelle YPF had been eroded by the sea.

In 1991 a group of neighbours proposed to establish a heritage railway that would run from Sarmiento to the Bosque Petrificado (Petrified Forest, 38 km. to the south of that city). The project was revived in early 2000s with no successful results.

Another ambitious project was introduced in 1996 by congress members of Chubut for the construction of the Ferrocarril Transpatagónico. The railway line would join San Antonio Oeste in Río Negro with Río Gallegos in Santa Cruz, including the construction off a bridge between Punta Loyola and La Misión in Tierra del Fuego. The project also included the reopening of Ferrocarril Puerto Deseado-Colonia Las Heras and Central Chubut Railway.

Other project was sent to the Congress of Argentina for approval in 2006. This proposed to create a railway museum and heritage railway in Km. 5 of Comodoro Rivadavia. The train would depart from that city, crossing Don Bosco and Astra, with an additional branch to Caleta Córdoba and San Jorge lighthouse.

In August 1995, the Government of Comodoro Rivadavia announced they were negotiating to transfer the line to the Chubut Province. The project planned to join Comodoro Rivadavia with Chilean city of Puerto Chacabuco. Representatives from the Provincial Government flew over the rail tracks to corroborate how many kilometers had been dismantled, considering that Santa Cruz Province had previously removed several tracks. After studying the region, they concluded that a 75% of the tracks still existed, most of them in good conditions.

Nevertheless, the expectations for the reopening of the line ceased in 2004 when the Provincial Government requested to the Central Government all the line was dismantled. The permission was granted one year later. The FCCRCS tracks were removed between 2005 and 2006 by company Natura Ecology, after signing an agreement which committed the company to carry 46,000 ties to El Maitén to refurbish heritage railway La Trochita. Works were made at a cost of AR$700,000. Soon after it was revealed that the agreement had been signed without been approved by the Provincial Legislature, therefore it was annulled and the ties were never sent to El Maitén.

According to what happened, the agreement infringed a national law that only allows the dismantle of rail tracks if they are destined for other railway line. Natura Ecology was hired directly with no bidding procedures and the company was also accused of having stolen the material. The rail ties were intercepted and seized by the local police in Trelew, totalizing four tracks with 100 tons of material with an estimated value of AR$1,000,000. Nevertheless, the rail profiles were never found. Some reports stated that they had been sent to different locations in Chubut, Greater Buenos Aires, Córdoba and even the city of Buenos Aires. The robbery of sleepers and profiles was never cleared.

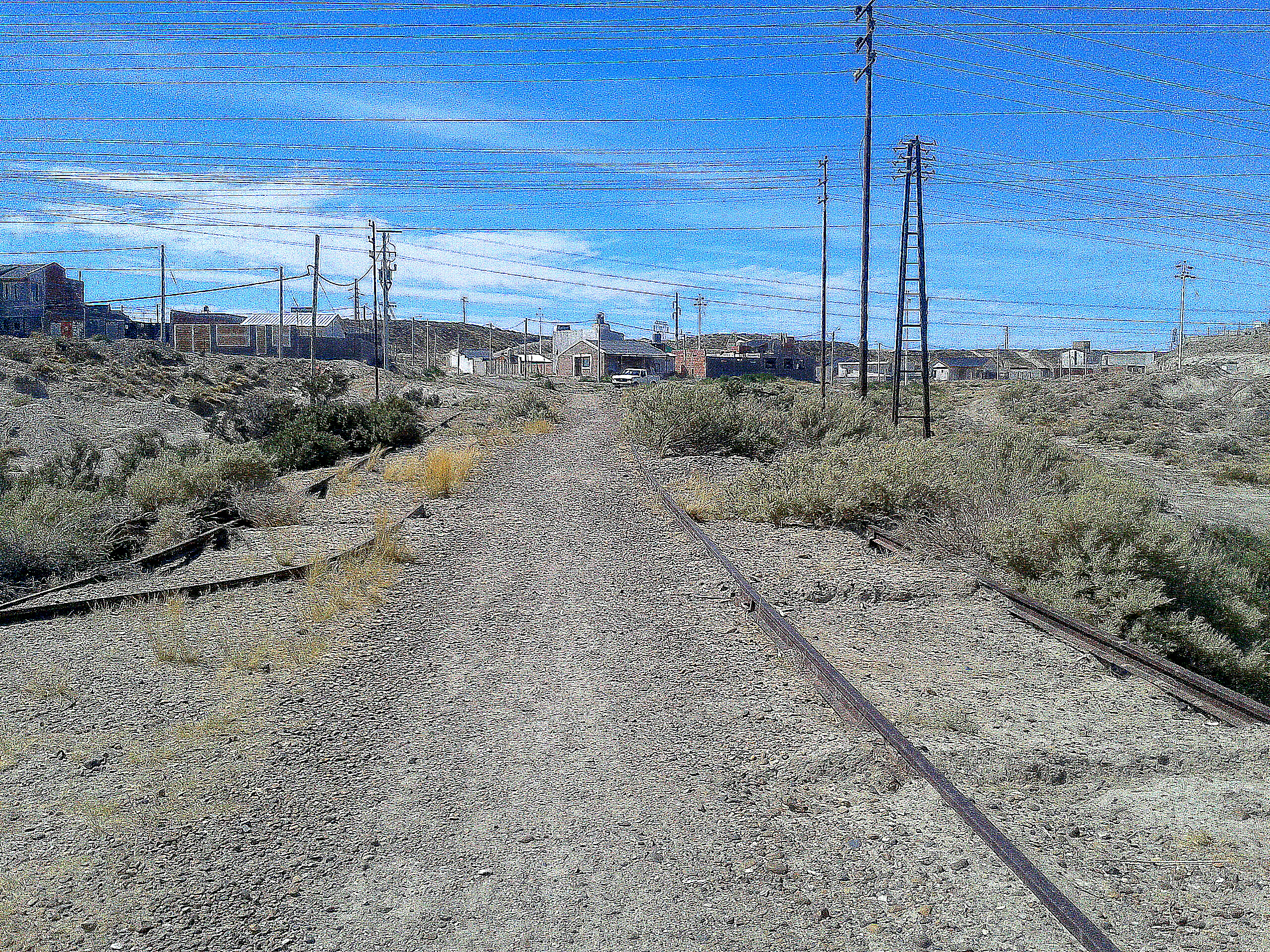
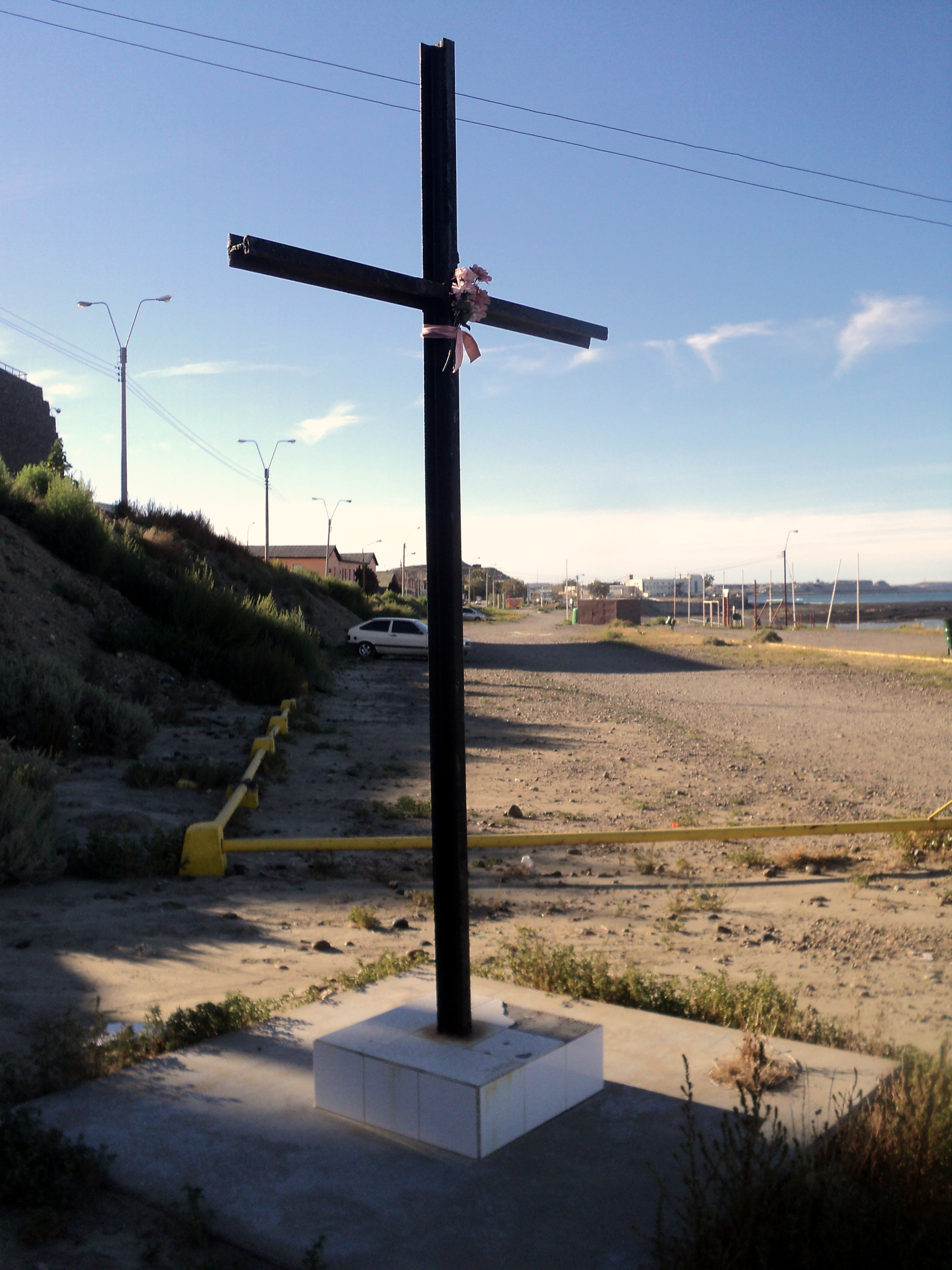
(Left): Remaining tracks of the Pte. Ortiz branch; (right): Cross on the site of the 1960 accident remembering the victims. Both images taken in 2013

In 2013, an initiative planned to build a railway to the Pacific Ocean, establishing a new port at the south of Rada Tilly to Puerto Aysén in Chile, excluding Comodoro Rivadavia port from the route. Nevertheless, the project was dismissed because of the bad weather in the zone.

Other projects included the reopening of the Ferrocarril Puerto Deseado in the Puerto Deseado-Tellier section, with the purpose of connecting Puerto Deseado with Puerto Chacabuco in Chile. A second stage considers the possibility of a future connection with Comodoro Rivadavia.

In March 2014, a group of representatives of Chinese company China State Construction Engineering Corporation stated that Chubut Province was enabled to build a railway line. They studied the ports of Comodoro Rivadavia and Madryn, searching for a route that allowed trains to join Aysén Region in Chile.

On May 25, 2014, a ceremony to commemorate the 100th. anniversary of the FCCRCS was held in Colonia Sarmiento.

== Relics and preserved heritage ==
Fortunately, many rolling stocks and other objects, as well as station buildings could be preserved from deterioration and vandalism. Some pieces are currently exhibited at the Petroleum Museum of Comodoro Rivadavia.

In Rada Tilly, a Ganz Work railcar was preserved for many years, remaining along the station building. In Comodoro Rivadavia, some rolling stock is preserved at the National Petroleum Museum and Railway & Port Museum. In Sarmiento, the railway station was restored after its destruction, reopening as the Regional Museum "Desiderio Torres".

=== Relics gallery ===
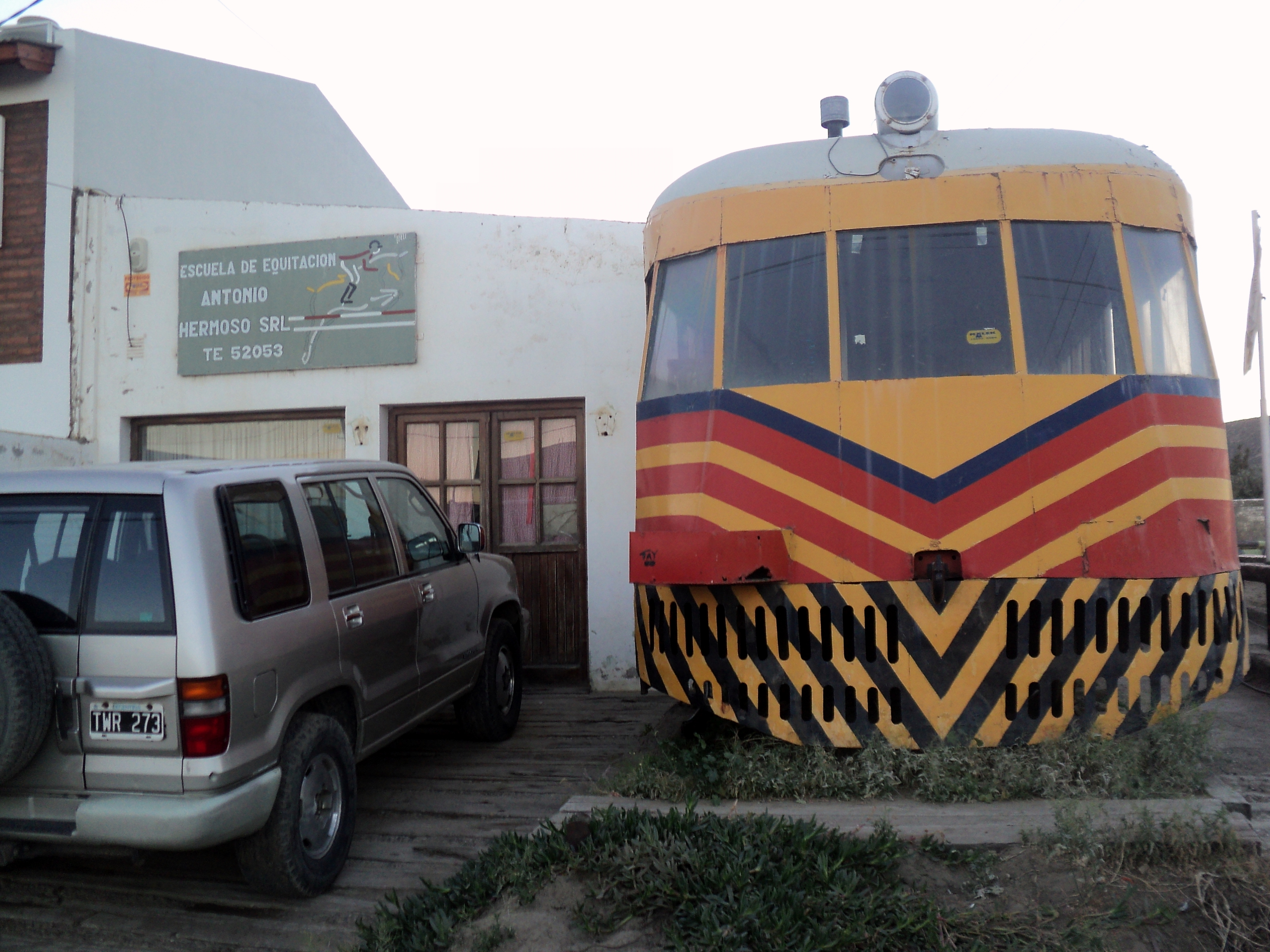
1936 Ganz Works railcar in Rada Tilly

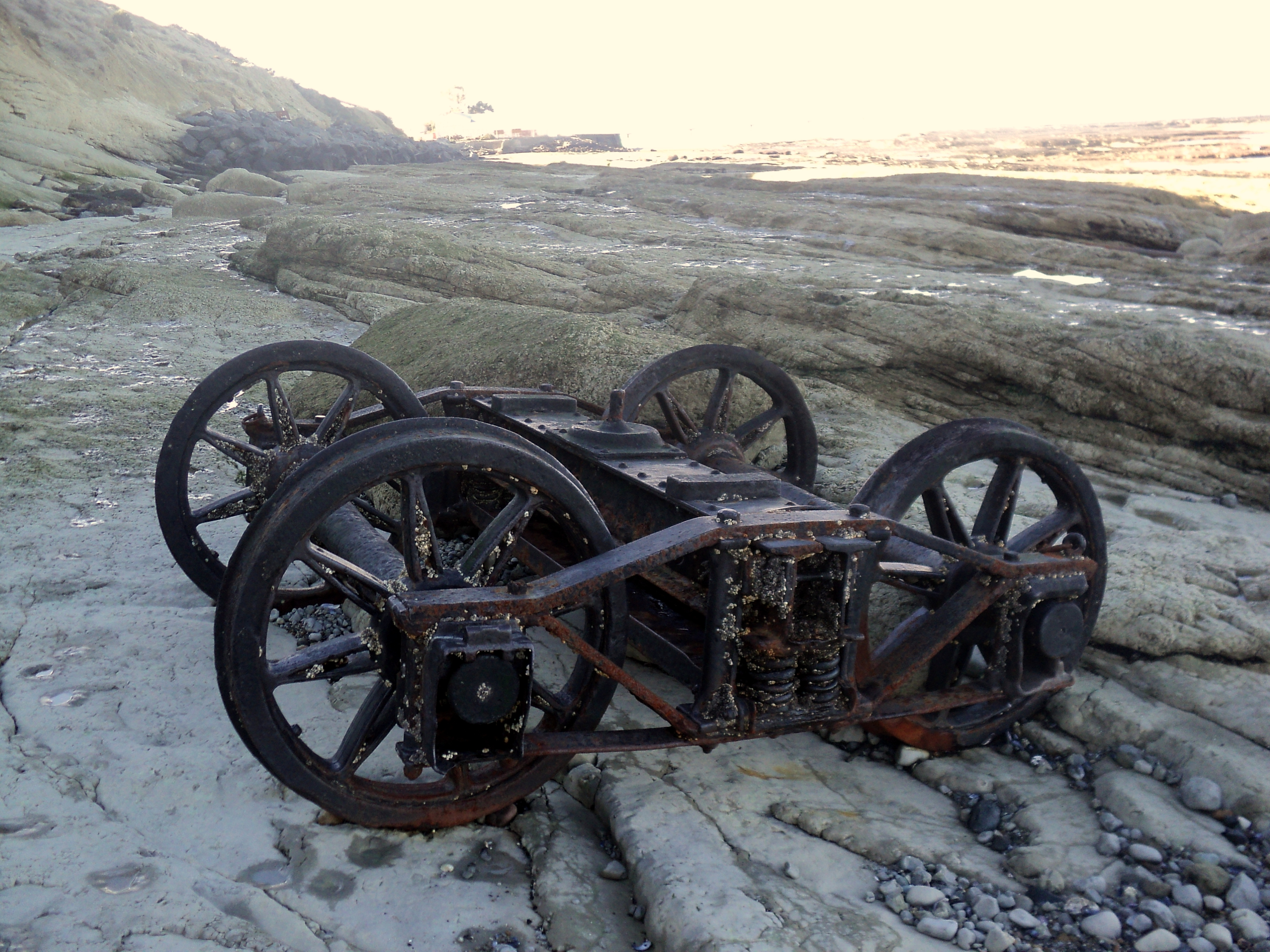
Bogie abandoned in the beach

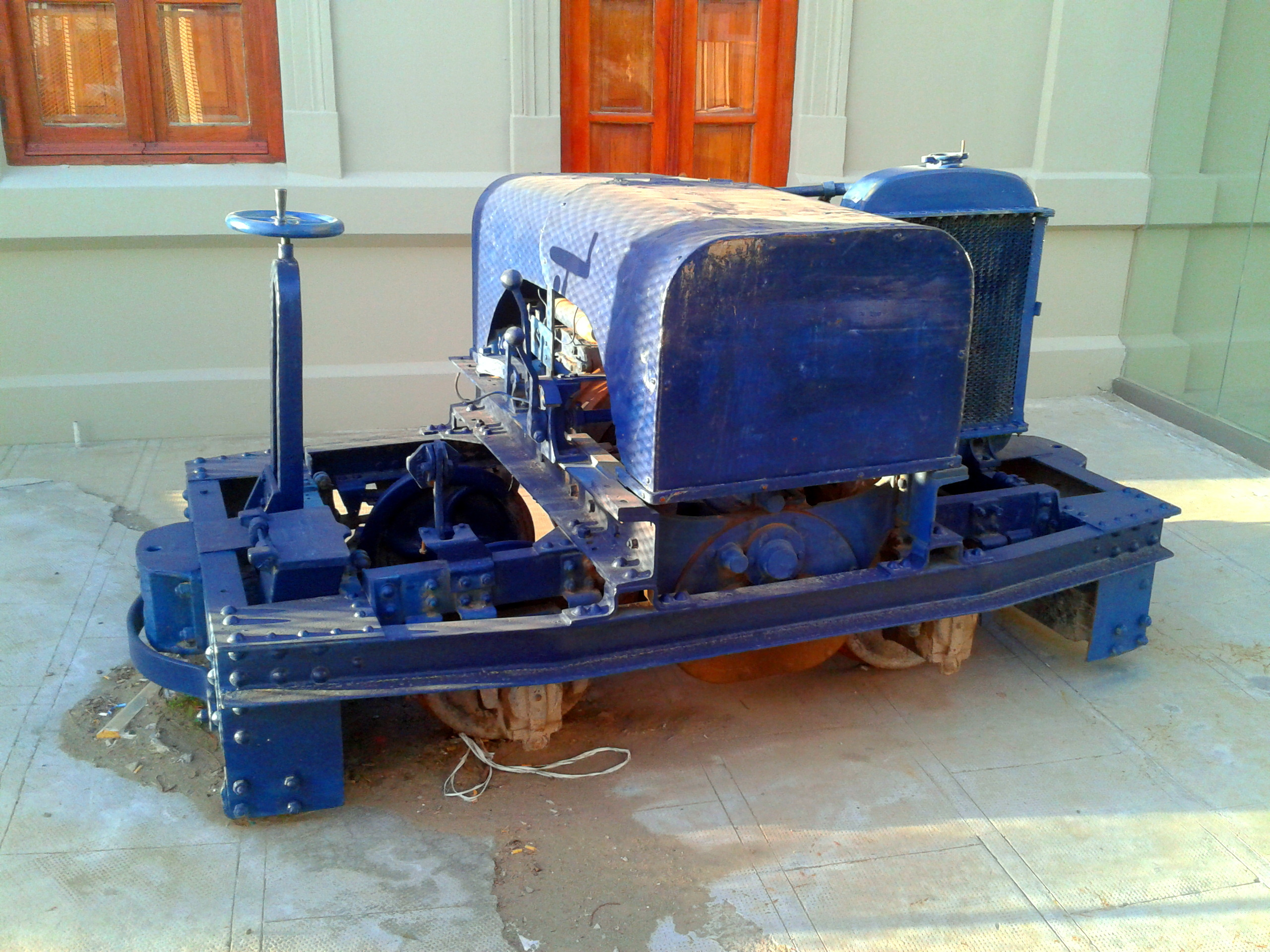
Draisine

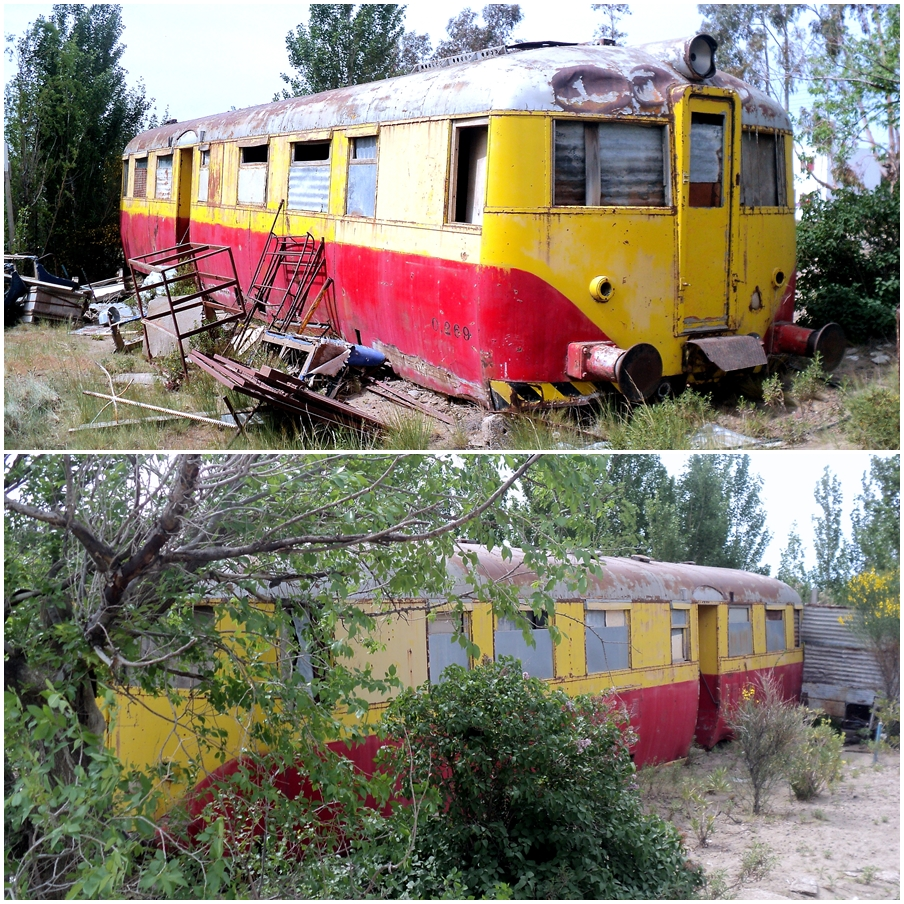
Drewry railcar

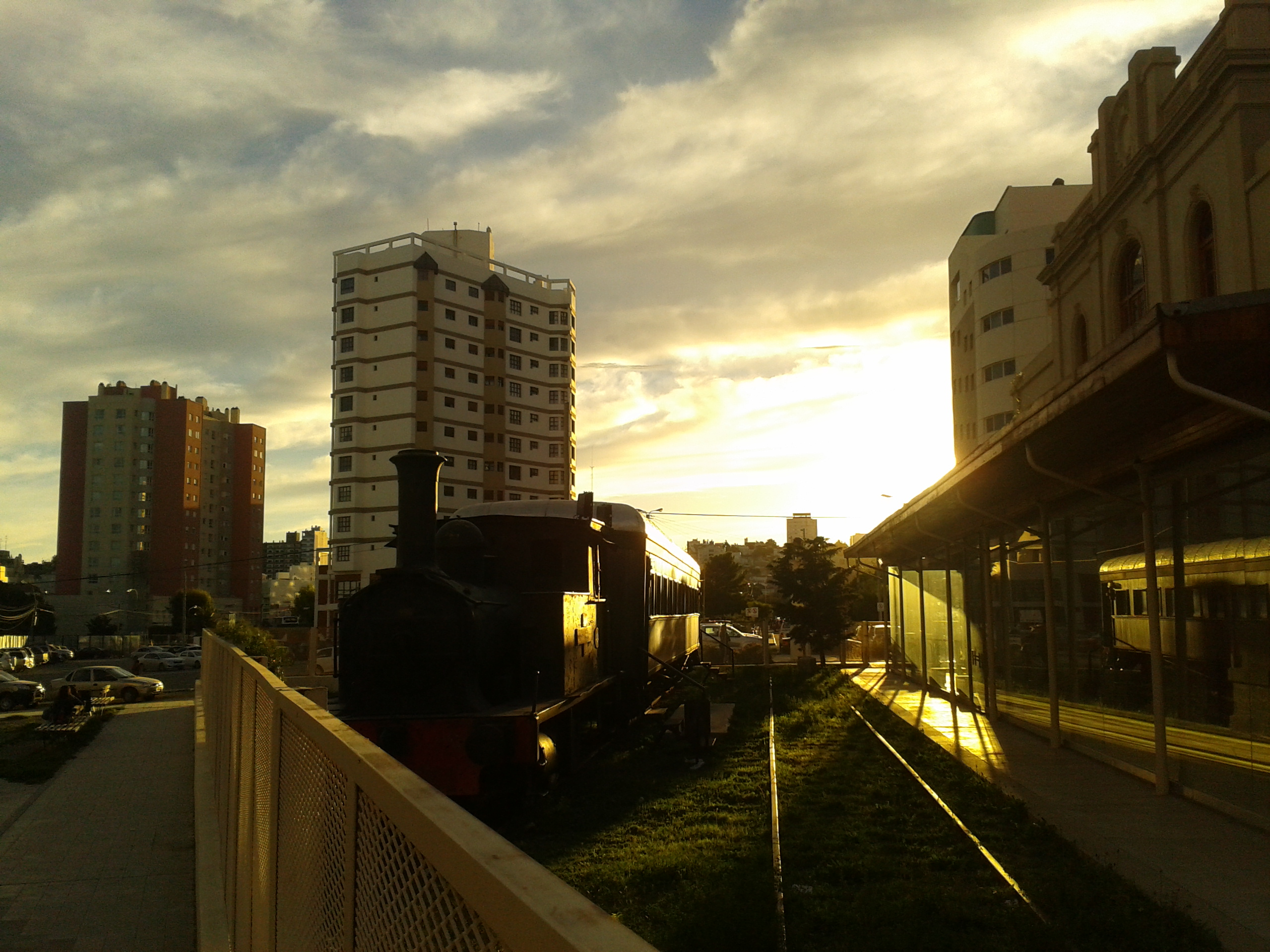
Last preserved train

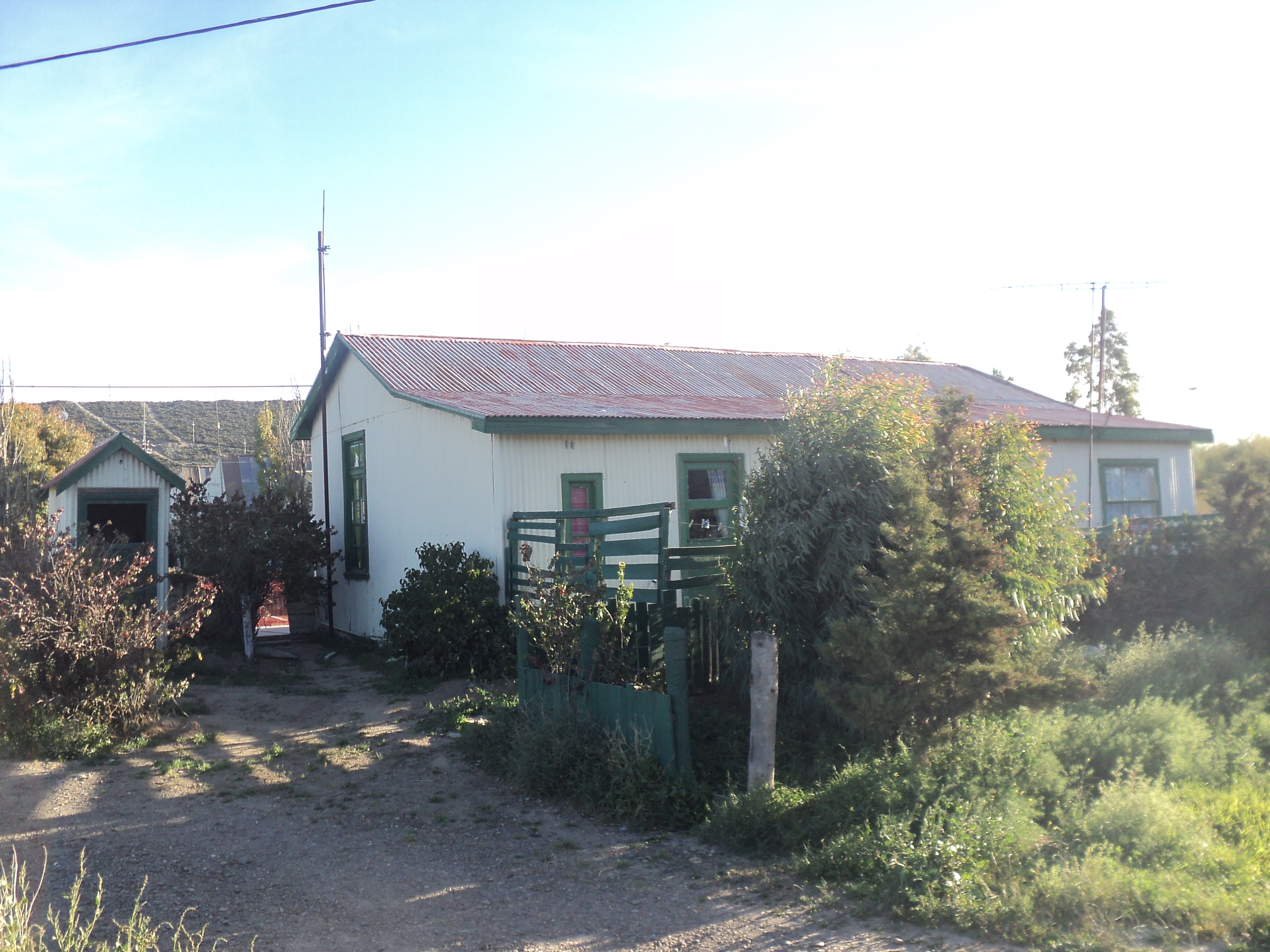
Diadema station

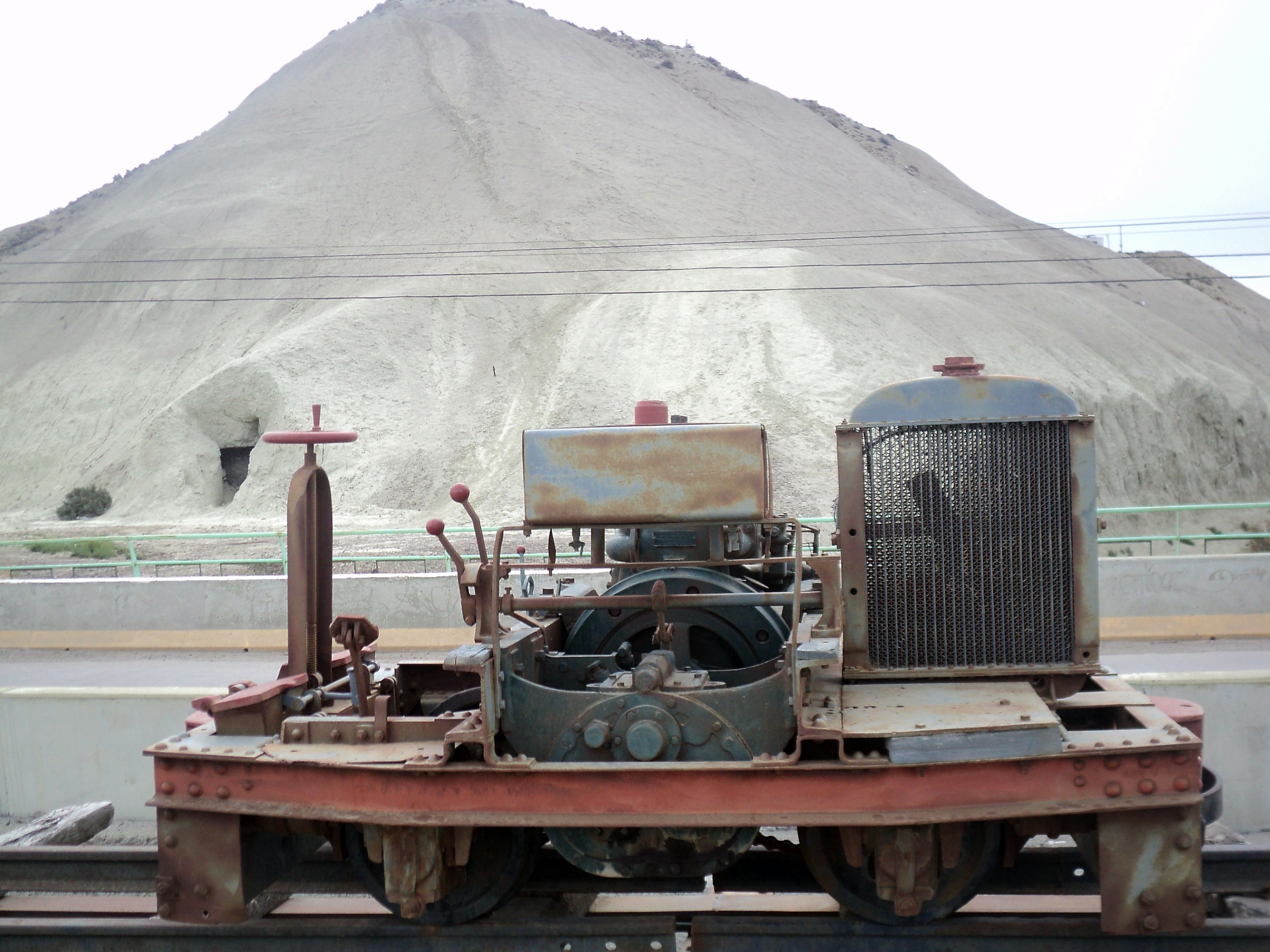
Bogie at km. 5

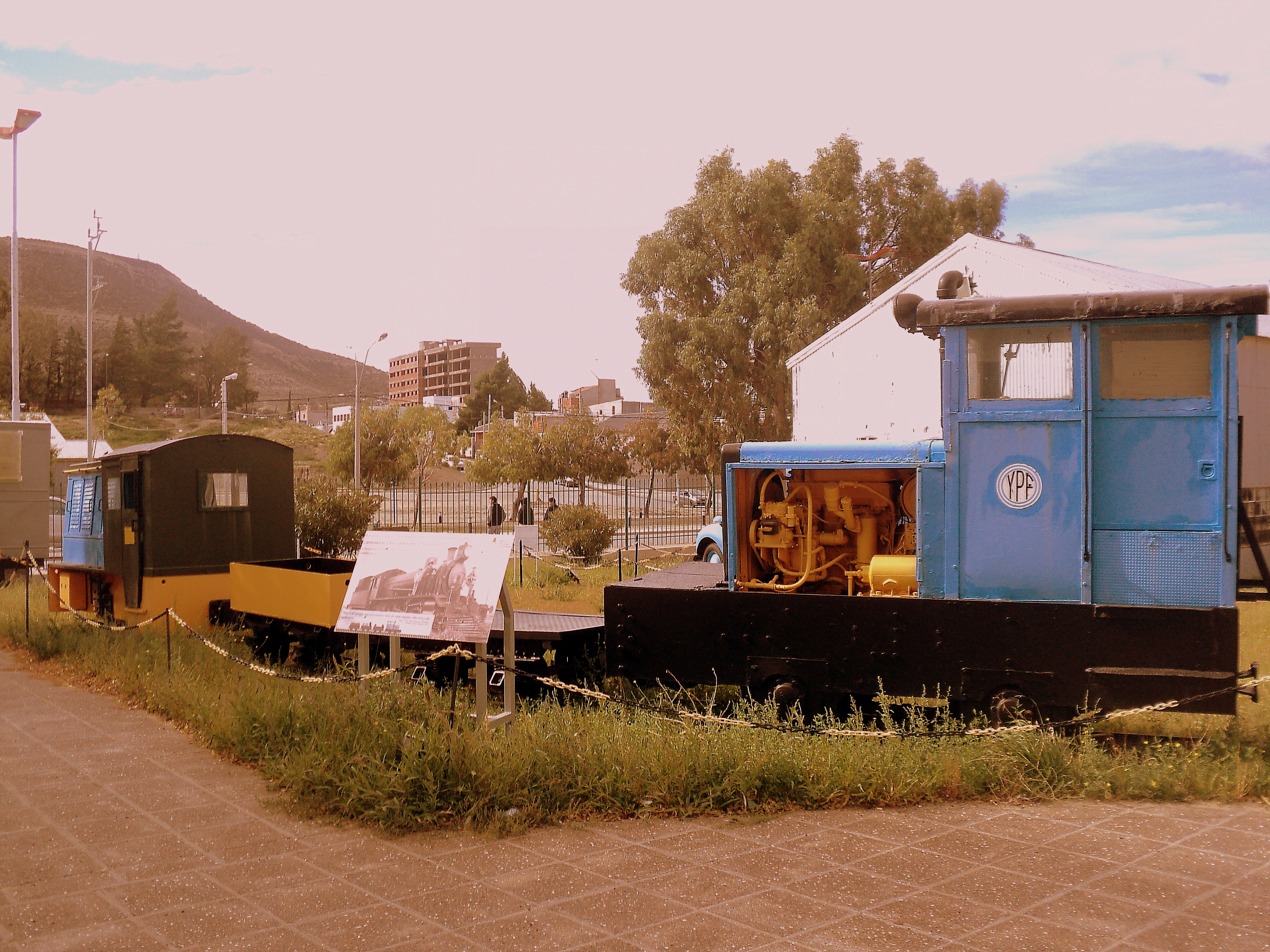
YPF train at the Museum

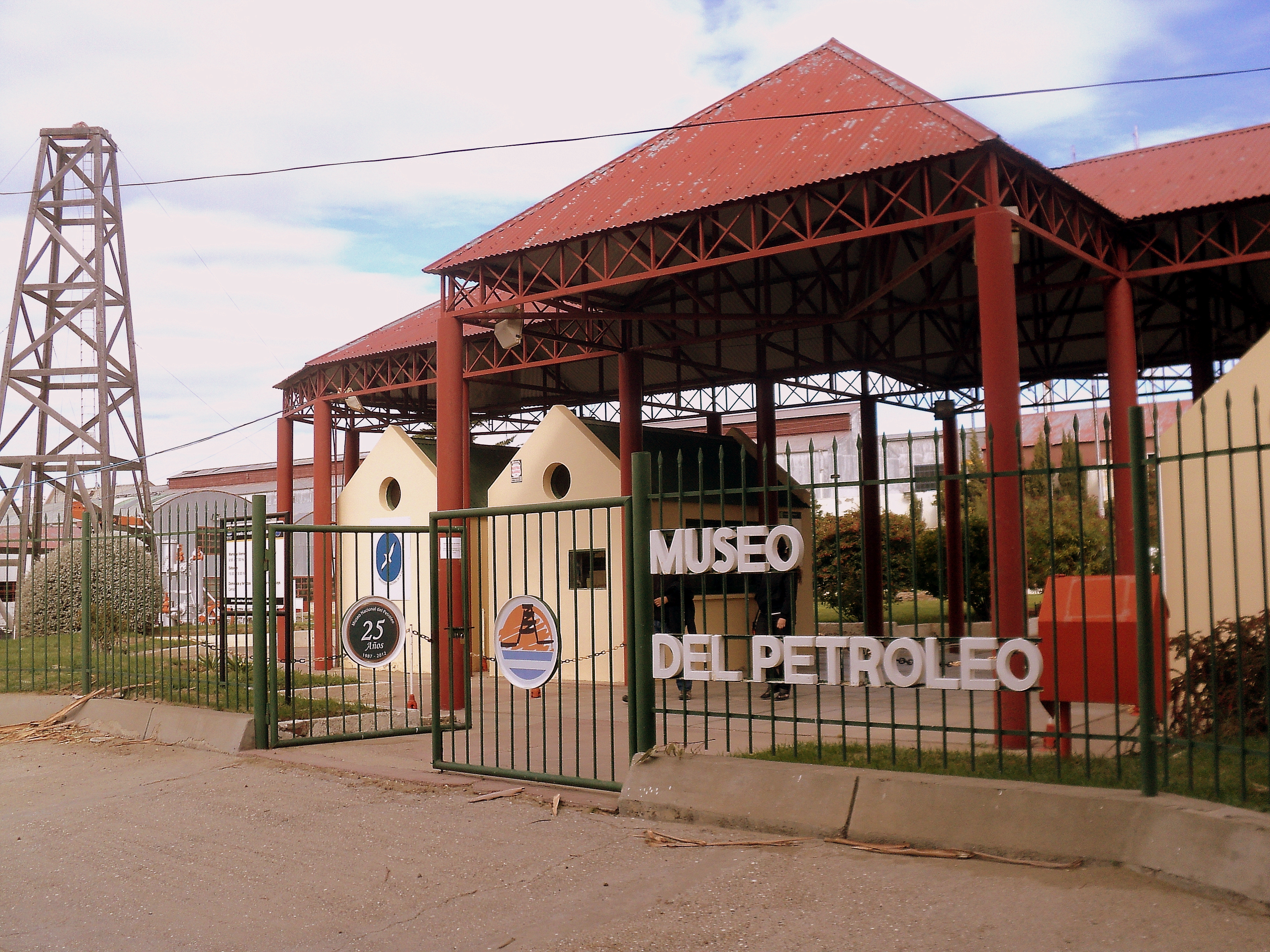
Petroleum Museum

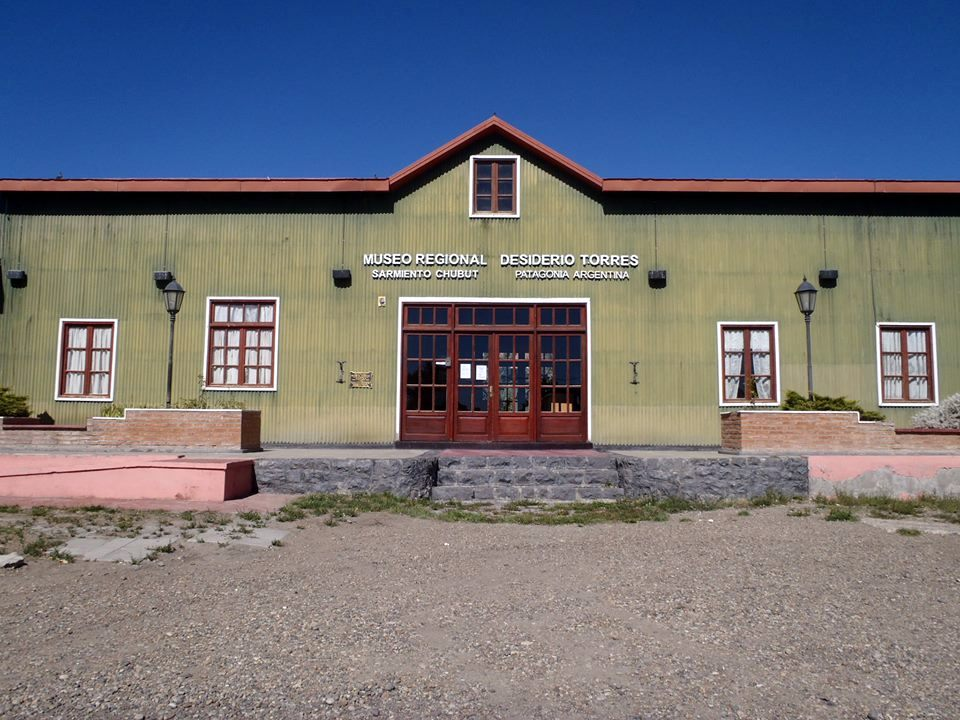
Sarmiento station, now a museum

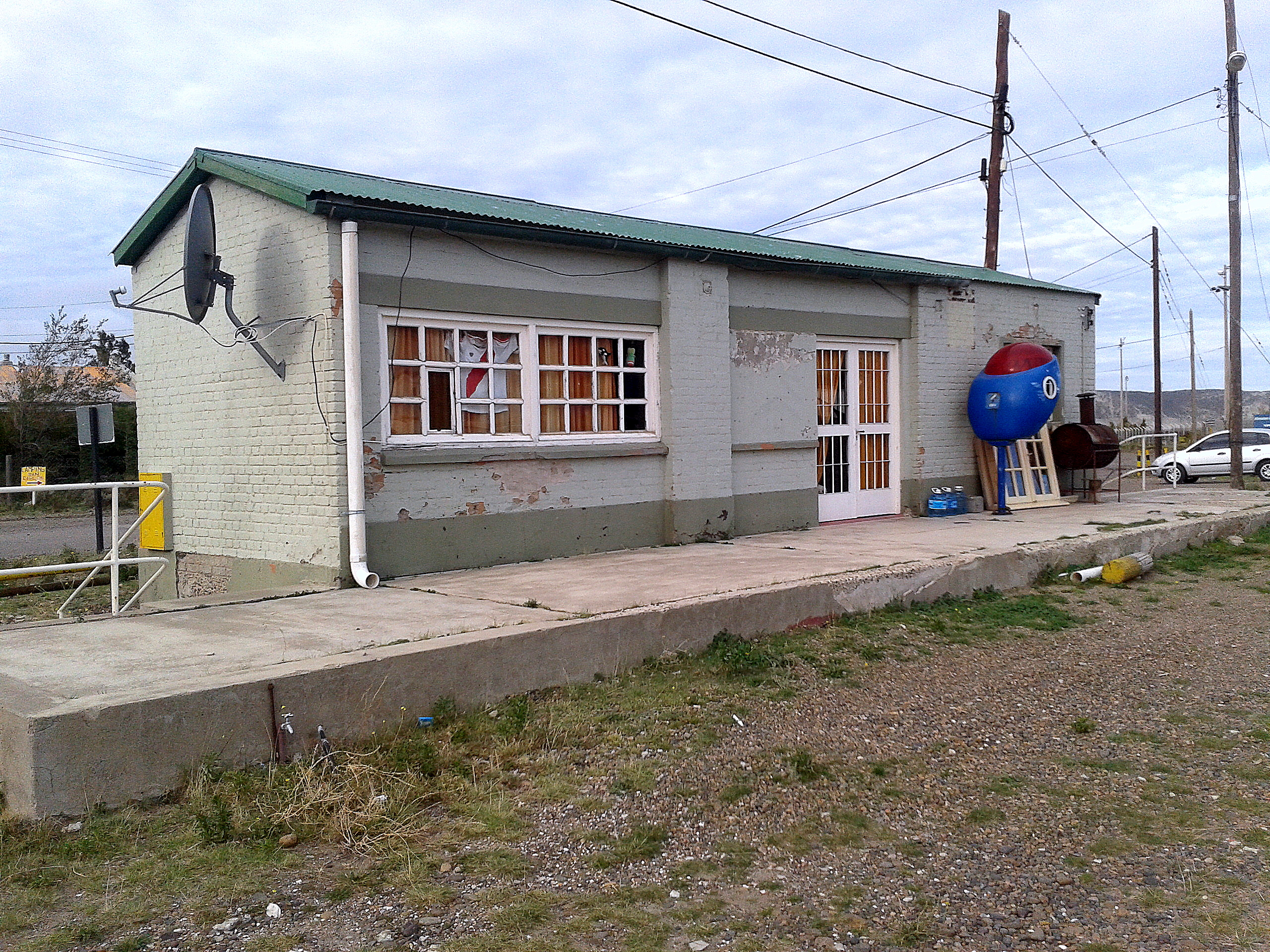
Astra station (2013)

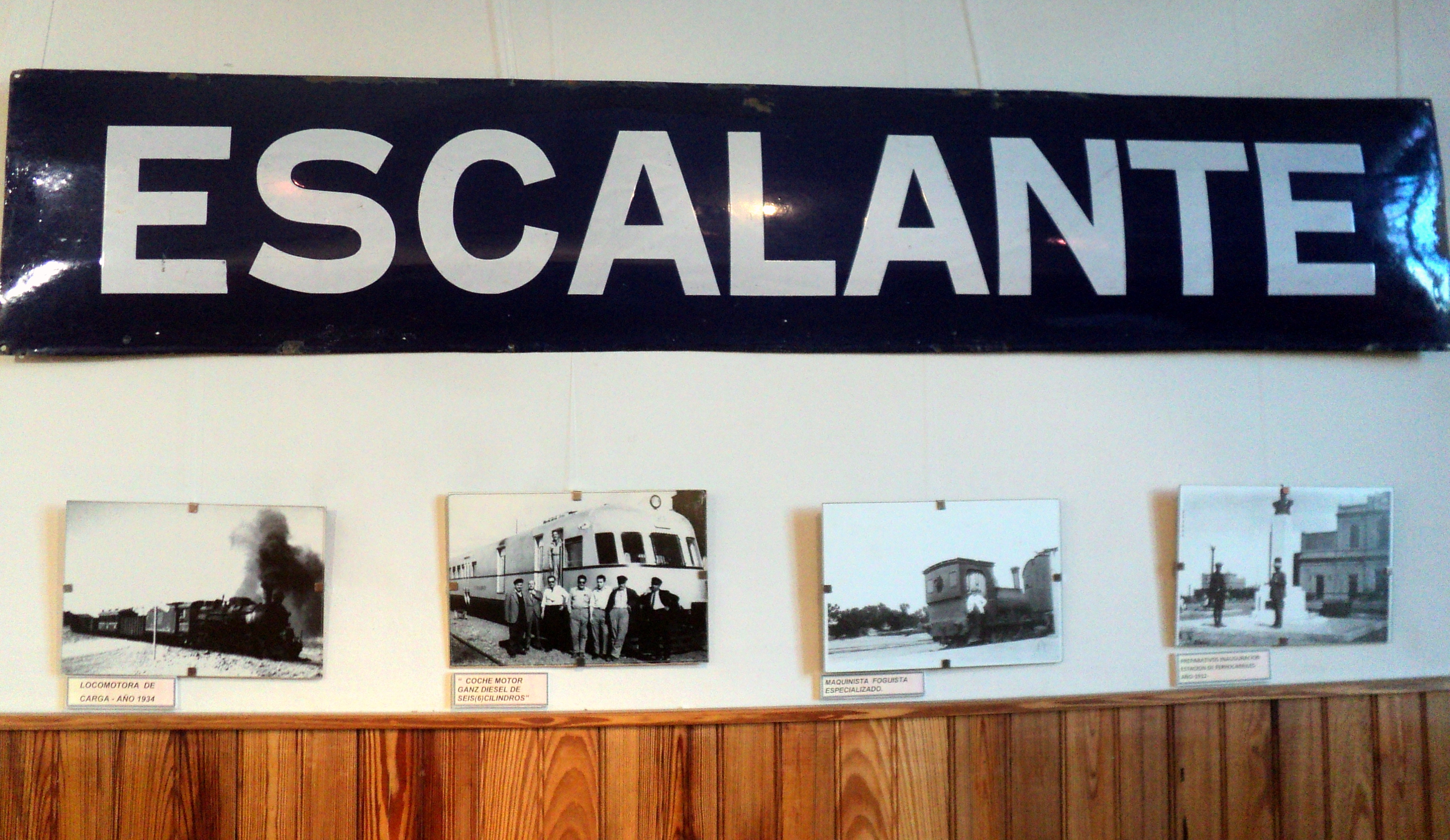
Station sign and photos

== See also ==
- Comodoro Rivadavia rail disaster (1953)
- Comodoro Rivadavia rail disaster (1960)
- Ferrocarriles Patagónicos

== Bibliography ==
- Aguado, Alejandro (1996). Aventuras Sobre Rieles Patagónicos: Ramal Comodoro Rivadavia – Sarmiento (Chubut).
- Aguado, Alejandro (1997). Cañadón Lagarto: 1911- 1935 - Un Pueblo Patagónico de Leyenda, Sacrificio y Muerte.
