= Comodoro Rivadavia rail disaster (1953) =

1952 Argentinian train collision

1953 Comodoro Rivadavia rail disaster
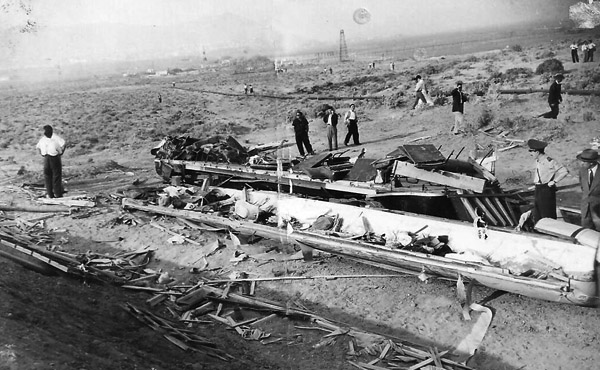
- The train lying on the beach after the fall

Details
- Date: February 15, 1953; 73 years ago
- Location: Punta Piedras, Chubut
- Country: Argentina
- Line: Comodoro Rivadavia–Rada Tilly
- Operator: Ferrocarriles Argentinos (FC Roca)
- Service: Passenger
- Incident type: Derailment
- Cause: Excessive speed and exceeded capacity

Statistics
- Trains: 1
- Passengers: 100
- Crew: 2
- Deaths: 36
- Injured: 65
Map of the C. Rivadavia–Rada Tilly line
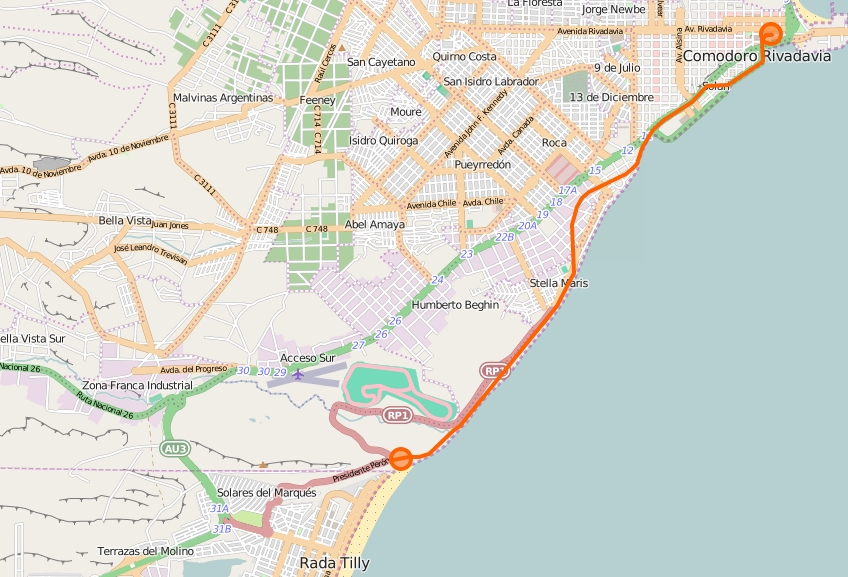

The 1953 Comodoro Rivadavia rail disaster occurred on February 15, 1953, in Punta Piedras, a beach resort near the city of Comodoro Rivadavia in the Patagonian province of Chubut, Argentina. It happened in the branch to Rada Tilly that extended alongside the coast, part of the Comodoro Rivadavia Railway and then operated by Ferrocarriles Argentinos.

The accident resulted in 36 fatalities and 65 injuries.

== Overview ==
The train had departed from Rada Tilly station carrying near 100 passengers, most of them were tourists spending their vacations in the city. Wagons were at full capacity due to high demand, as the day of the accident (15 February) was not only a hot day but a holiday.

The single-unit railbus (numbered "52") was about to reach Comodoro Rivadavia when it took a sharp curve, known in the neighborhood as the "sulfa", where the sheds of the Sagosa company stands nowadays. The high speed (80 kilometres per hour (50 mph)) of the train, the exceeded number of passengers (there were 100 people when the maximum capacity of the coaches were 48), and the 750 mm narrow gauge's insability caused the railcar to be derailed, falling from a 40-metre (130 ft) hillside in a zone known as playa 99, a beach resort in Punta Piedras. The coach was completely destroyed almost completely while its passengers were expelled from it or were smashed by the train.

An emergency operation was immediately set up to help the victims. Due to the low populated region, doctors and nurses were sent from Buenos Aires in a sanitary train to assist the multiple injured. Injured people were carried to Comodoro Rivadavia and Astra Hospitals and Napolitani Sanatorium.

Although the initial number of dead were 23, it then increased to 36 and 65 injured. The number of deaths would continue to grow due to another accident in the rescue operative, when the crane fell off while raising the train, resulting in more fatal victims. The verticality of the slope where the train fell was an additional challenge for the rescue team.

The railcar laid upside down. There were people with their bodies stuck in the seats, all in the midst of screams that shook me up and paralysed me.

— Ramón Míguez, eyewitness to the accident on Rivadavia newspaper, 16 February 1953

== Aftermath ==
After the accident, the branch to Rada Tilly was closed permanently. Nevertheless, it would not be the last accident on the Comodoro Rivadavia Railway. In 1960, a brake failure caused a train collision in General Mosconi with 3 people dead.

The CRR came to a definitive end in January 1978 when the last train arrived in Comodoro Rivadavia. One year before, the military government led by Jorge Videla had promulgated a decree that closed a high number of rail services in Argentina due to their low profitability, being the CRR one of the several lines affected. A new decree promulgated in 1993 under the Carlos Menem's administration, ratified the closure.

== See also ==
- Comodoro Rivadavia rail disaster (1960)
