= Vladimir Covalschi =

Argentine footballer (born 1988)

Personal information
- Date of birth: 28 October 1988 (age 38)
- Place of birth: Rada Tilly, Escalante, Argentina
- Height: 1.88 m (6 ft 2 in)
- Position: Forward

Team information
- Current team: Club Argentino

Senior career*
| Years | Team | Apps | (Gls) |
| 2011 | Central Ballester | 1 | (0) |
- Rada Tilly
| 2016 | CAI | 16 | (8) |
| 2017–2018 | Newbery | | |
| 2019 | Real Pilar | 4 | (0) |
| 2025– | Club Argentino | 16 | (2) |
- * Club domestic league appearances and goals

Vladimir Covalschi (born 28 October 1988) is an Argentine footballer who plays as a forward for Spanish sixth division side Club Argentino.

== Early life ==
Born in Rada Tilly in the Escalante Department of Argentina, Covalschi is of Russian descent. Growing up he played rugby union, and represented Rada Tilly, Chubut, Calafate and Hindú Club, as well as a select team of the Unión de Rugby Austral (Southern Rugby Union).

== Club career ==
In 2010, Covalschi saw an advertisement for a new Spanish reality television show, Football Cracks, while walking to university in Buenos Aires. Despite having never played organised football before, he decided to sign up, where he was one of three Argentines selected to travel to Madrid for the competition. He arrived in Spain, where he was evaluated by former footballers Zinedine Zidane and Enzo Francescoli, as well as being trained by Germán Burgos, and though he was one of the last nineteen remaining candidates, he was eventually eliminated.

On his return to Argentina, he featured briefly for Central Ballester, playing one game in the 2011–12 Primera D Metropolitana. After this, having struggled to find a club, he returned to his hometown, joining Club Atlético Rada Tilly. Initially a defender, Covalschi transitioned to play as a centre-forward while at Rada Tilly, proving himself to be a prolific goal-scorer, scoring 29 goals in 22 games in the 2015 season and being recognised with the Mara Dorada award for his performances. This form earned him a trial with Italian side Gela, though he was unable to join due to issues with the contract.

He moved to Comisión de Actividades Infantiles (CAI) for the 2016 season, where he represented the side in the Torneo Argentino B, and the following year, after signing for Newbery, he was again recognised with the Mara Dorada award in 2017. In January 2019, he joined Real Pilar, and would feature for them in their historic Copa Argentina match against Vélez Sarsfield; despite being four divisions lower than Vélez, they won 1–0 at the Estadio Alfredo Beranger, making history as they became the first team from the Argentinian fifth division to reach the last-16 of the competition.

In September 2025, Covalschi came out of retirement, moving to Spain to join sixth division side Club Argentino. He scored his first goal for the club on 11 January 2026 in a 3–1 win against Escuela de Fútbol Usera.

== Later life ==
Following his retirement from football, Covalschi took an interest in both acting and modelling, making his theatrical debut in October 2019 in Claudio Hamed's Antes de que sea tarde (Before it's too late). In late 2020, he signed an international advertising contract with British cough drop manufacturers, Halls. He later took up taekwondo, and in June 2022 he won a local tournament in Mendoza.

== Career statistics ==
=== Club ===
Appearances and goals by club, season and competition
| Club | Season | League | | | Cup | | Other | | Total | |
| Club | Season | Division | Apps | Goals | Apps | Goals | Apps | Goals | Apps | Goals |
|---|---|---|---|---|---|---|---|---|---|---|
| Central Ballester | 2011–12 | Primera D Metropolitana | 1 | 0 | 0 | 0 | 0 | 0 | 1 | 0 |
| Rada Tilly | 2015 | Liga de Comodoro Rivadavia | 22 | 29 | 0 | 0 | 0 | 0 | 22 | 29 |
| CAI | 2016 | Torneo Argentino B | 16 | 8 | 0 | 0 | 0 | 0 | 16 | 8 |
| Real Pilar | 2019 | Primera D Metropolitana | 4 | 0 | 1 (Note: Appearances in the Copa Argentina) | 0 | 0 | 0 | 5 | 0 |
| Club Argentino | 2025–26 | Primera Autonómica de Aficionados de Madrid | 16 | 2 | 0 | 0 | 0 | 0 | 16 | 2 |
| Career total | | | 59 | 39 | 1 | 0 | 0 | 0 | 60 | 39 |
