= Comodoro Rivadavia rail disaster (1960) =

1960 train collision in Argentina

1960 Comodoro Rivadavia rail disaster
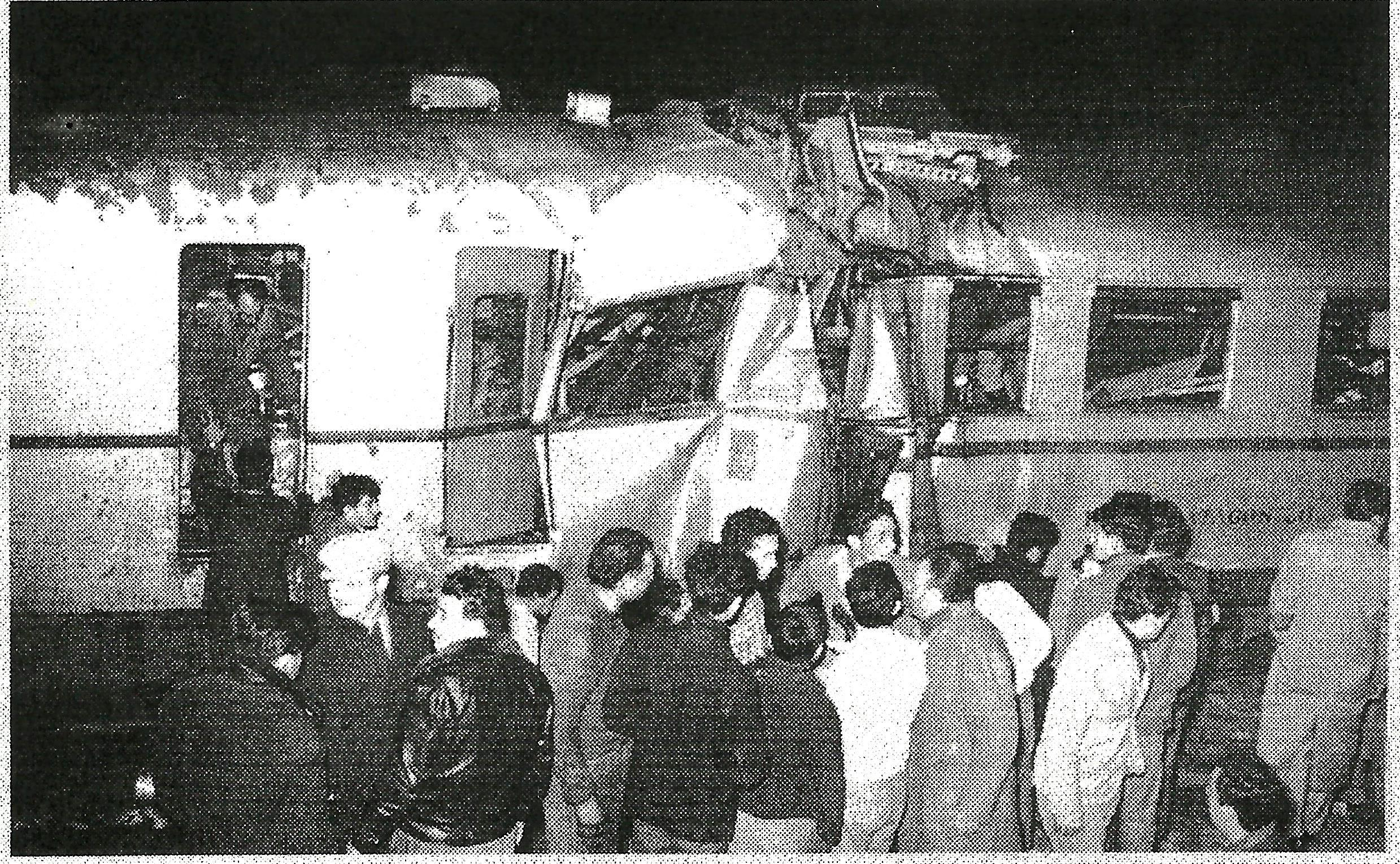
- People at the train after the collision

Details
- Date: July 12, 1960; 65 years ago 19:00
- Location: Comodoro Rivadavia
- Country: Argentina
- Line: Comodoro Rivadavia–Sarmiento
- Operator: Ferrocarriles Argentinos (FC Roca)
- Service: Passenger
- Incident type: Collision
- Cause: Brake failure

Statistics
- Trains: 2
- Passengers: 100
- Deaths: 3
- Injured: (not informed)

The Comodoro Rivadavia rail disaster occurred on July 12, 1960, in the city of Comodoro Rivadavia in the Patagonian province of Chubut, Argentina. It happened in a region between stations Muelle YPF and Gamela in the General Mosconi neighborhood, popularly known as "Kilómetro 3".

The main cause of the accident was a brake failure that caused the railcar to run at a high speed from Colonia Sarmiento until it crashed into another unit that had departed from Comodoro Rivadavia.

== Overview ==
The progressive deterioration of rolling stock due to lack of maintenance caused the Comodoro Rivadavia Railway (which had belonged to Argentine State Railway and was operated by Ferrocarriles Argentinos by then) to have obsolete vehicles by 1960. With the Plan Larkin (a general restructuring of Argentine transport made by engineer Thomas Larkin at a request of the government of Argentina led by Arturo Frondizi) that recommended the closure of unproductive and non-profitable railway lines, the renovation of rolling stock was completely dismissed. As a result, the CRR was forced to continue using obsolete (and risky) equipment.

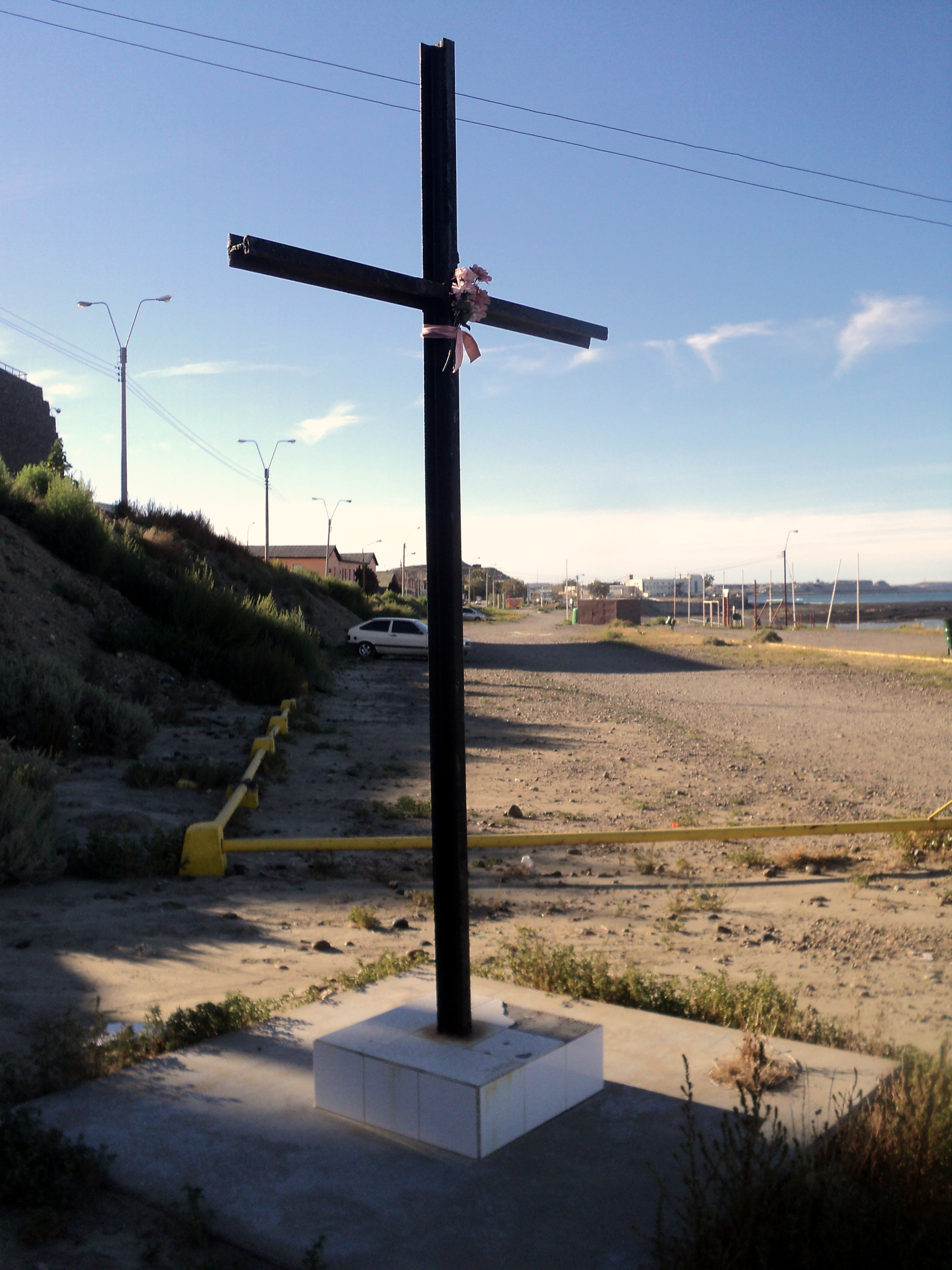
A cross on the site of the accident remembers the victims

On July 12, 1960, at 19:00, a Ganz railcar that returned from Sarmiento cracked its brake system. As the emergency brake didn't work either, the train started a headlong race towards Comodoro Rivadavia, helped by a downward gradient towards the city. Despite the desperate attempts of the train driver, it was impossible to stop the railcar, which crashed into a Drewry unit departing from Comodoro Rivadavia towards Astra station. The impact was strong enough to pull both units almost 200 meters to Muelle YPF station. Most of the passengers were severely injured.

A total of 100 people (from both railcars) were involved in the accident, with 3 fatalities: Marta Fernández, Osvaldo Barceló, and Agustín De Alba. The tragedy also had a huge amount of injured passengers, many of whom became disabled. Few moments after the accident, hundreds of people arrived to help.

A cross made of railway tracks was placed on the site of the accident to commemorate the tragedy. On August 12, 2021, the municipality of Comodoro Rivadavia paid homage to victims and their relatives placing a plaque that tells the unfortunate event.

== See also ==
- Comodoro Rivadavia rail disaster (1953)
