= Caleta Córdoba =

Village in Chubut, Argentina

Coordinates: 45°44′S 67°04′W

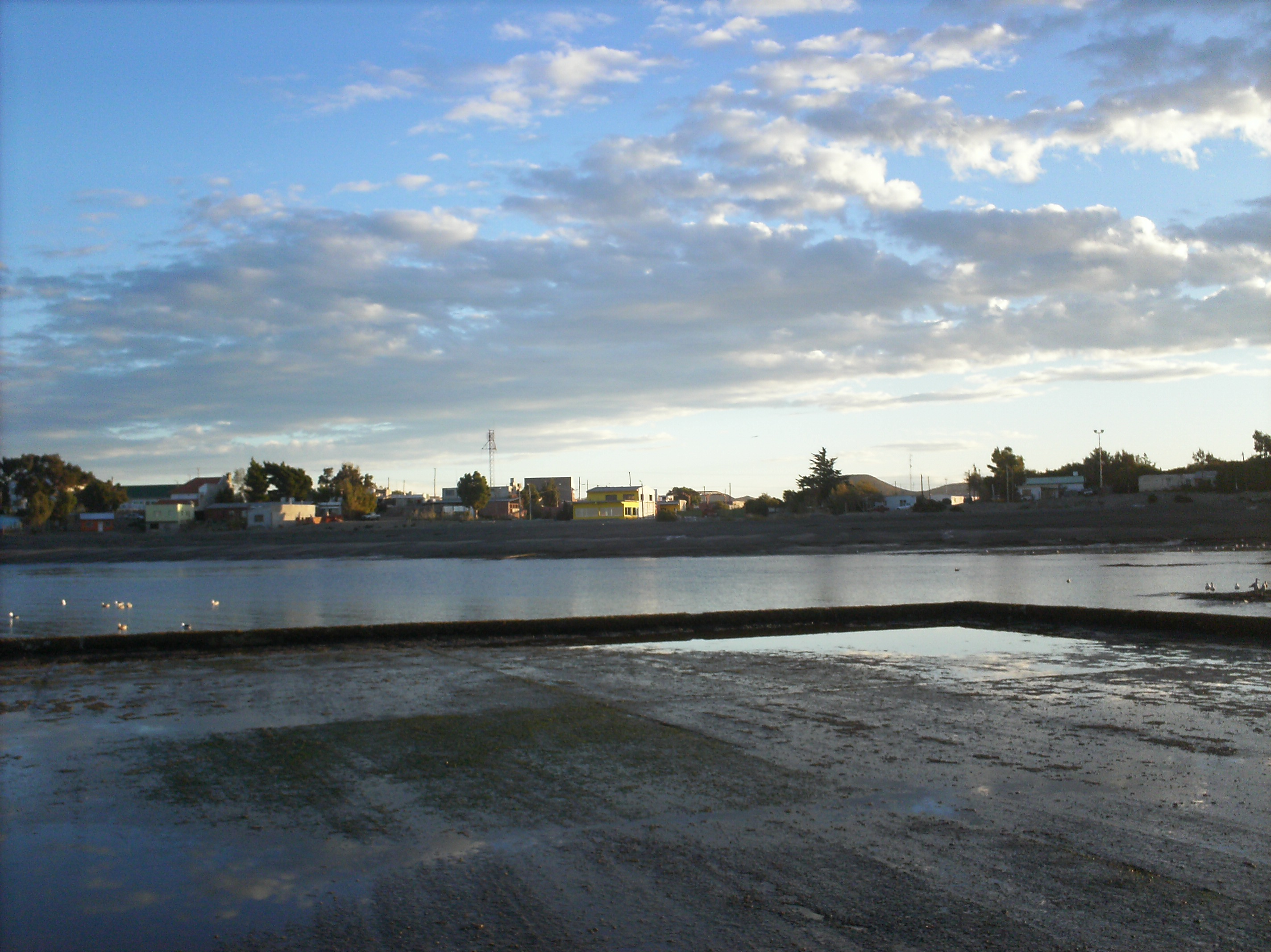
View of Caleta Córdova from its beach

Caleta Córdova is a small village with 638 inhabitants (INDEC, 2001) located in Escalante Department in the province of Chubut, Argentina, at the Atlantic coast 16 kilometers north of Comodoro Rivadavia, an economically oil-based city in the province of Chubut. Politically it belongs to the municipality of Comodoro Rivadavia.

The village's inhabitants are almost entirely dependent on the city of Comodoro Rivadavia for all power and food resources. It is home to many oil workers, has an oil-exporting port (the so-called monoboya) and also offers fishing along the village's single bridge as a tourist attraction. There is one station of Argentina's "Prefectura", or coast guard, which operates with several small boats.

In January 2008 a ship lost petroleum near the village and contaminated the coastal zone, which is home to penguins and sea lions.
