= San Jorge Lighthouse =

Lighthouse in Comodoro Rivadavia, Argentina

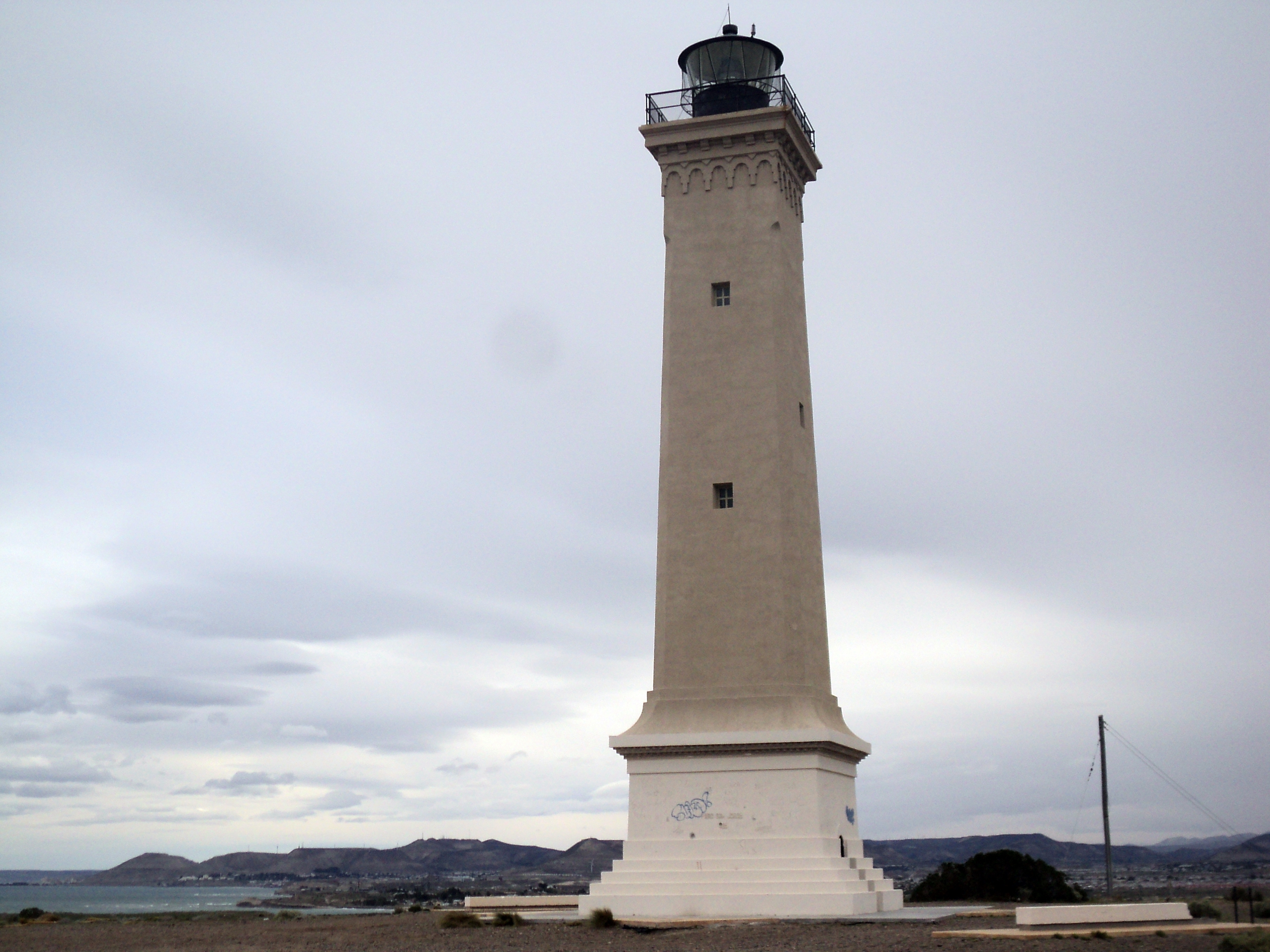
- Location: Off the coast of the San Jorge Gulf, near Comodoro Rivadavia, Argentina
- Coordinates: 45°46′44″S 67°22′47″W
- Constructed: 1925
- Height: 27 metres (89 ft)

Light
- Focal height: 78 metres (256 ft)

The San Jorge Lighthouse (Spanish: Faro San Jorge) is a lighthouse located in the city of Comodoro Rivadavia, Argentina.

== Structure ==
The lighthouse is located approximately 17 km (11 mi) from the city center of Comodoro Rivadavia. It stands at a height of 27 m (89 ft). The lighthouse contains 100 stairs leading to an upper balcony. The building was constructed using limestone bricks.

The lighthouse's power supply initially allowed a viewing range of 21 nmi (39 km; 24 mi), however this decreased to 14 nmi (26 km; 16 mi) after the building was connected to the city's main power grid.

== History ==
Construction of the lighthouse began in 1924 after the older city lighthouse became too dangerous to use. It was completed the following year in 1925. Material and construction costs were paid for by several oil and railway companies. In 2005, the lighthouse was declared a heritage site by the city of Comodoro Rivadavia.

The lighthouse continues to be jointly maintained by both the Argentine Navy and the local government.
