= Bahía Bustamante =

- Municipality and village
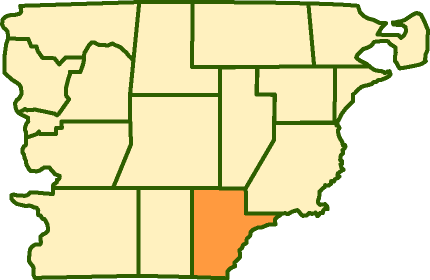
- Municipal locator

- Location in Argentina
- Coordinates: 45°08′S 66°32′W
- Country: Argentina
- Province: Chubut Province
- Department: Escalante Department
- Established: 1953

Government
  - Type: Mayor

Population (2011)
  - Total: 40
- Time zone: UTC−3 (ART)
- Postal code: U9111
- Area code: 0297
- Website: www.bahiabustamante.com

Bahía Bustamante is a village and municipality in the Escalante Department of the Chubut Province in southern Argentina. The village was established in 1953. It is located 180 km north of Comodoro Rivadavia and 250 km south of Trelew.

This is the only town in Argentina, dedicated to collecting seaweed and mussel. It has a nature reserve where about 4000 sea lions live, colonies of more than 50, 000 penguins, 22 species of birds, white sand beaches and a petrified forest. The village was featured in several travel articles in March 2011.

== Population ==
Bahía Bustamante had a population of 40 people in March 2011, representing a marked increase compared to 11 in the 2001 census. The gender distribution in 2001 was 10 males to one female.

== History ==
Don Lorenzo Soriano (Baeza, Jaén Spain, 1901-1987) visited the area in 1953, looking for seaweed to extract colloid that allowed him to continue with the production of the Malvik hairspray, an activity that began in 1947. After visiting the Patagonian coast in search of seaweed, he discovered Bahia Bustamante, known locally as Bahia Podrida (Rotten Bay) due to the accumulation of seaweed in a state of putrefaction. He performed the first assessment and then, with his children, he began collecting seaweed, giving rise to this unique seaweed town.

At first there were only two buildings facing the sea. There they installed and began to build what is now Bahia Bustamante. They built houses and rooms for more than 400 employees, a school, church, police station, warehouses, workshops and a procurement store, among other facilities.

Thus this small town was born in a lonely place in Patagonia, surviving on natural resources. From 2004, in addition to its agricultural activities, tourism activities were added, opening its doors to those who want to enjoy an incredible nature.

In 2009 the Patagonia Austral Interjurisdictional Coastal Marine Park was created, which includes Bahia Bustamante.

== Activities ==
Bahia Bustamante features a variety of landscapes and wildlife. Activities in the area depend on the tides and weather conditions. Visitors can observe birds and sea lions, explore the Petrified Forest, learn about the local seaweed industry, and visit a traditional Patagonian ranch. Other activities include hiking, horseback riding and mountain biking. The area also has white-sand beaches and clear water surrounded by reddish rocks.
