= Escalante Department =

Escalante
- Departamento Escalante
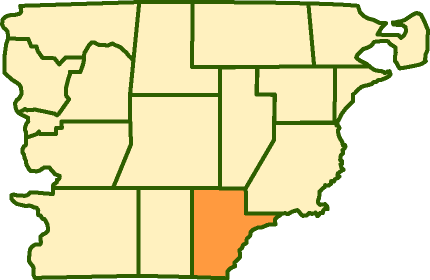
- location of Escalante Department in Chubut Province
- Coordinates: 45°52′S 67°30′W
- Country: Argentina
- Province: Chubut
- Foundation: February 23, 1901
- Founder: ?
- Capital: Comodoro Rivadavia

Area
  - Total: 14,015 km^{2} (5,411 sq mi)

Population (2001 census [INDEC])
  - Total: 143,609
  - Density: 10.247/km^{2} (26.539/sq mi)
- Post code: U9000
- Area code: 0297
- Resident: escalantense
- Distance to Buenos Aires: 1,761km
- Website: http://www.comodoro.gov.ar

Escalante Department is a department of Chubut Province in Argentina.

The provincial subdivision has a population of about 143,000 inhabitants in an area of 14,015 km^{2}, and its capital city is Comodoro Rivadavia.

The department is named after doctor Wenceslao Escalante, who was part of the Ministry of Agriculture during the presidency of Julio A. Roca.

== Attractions ==
- Autodromo Comodoro Rivadavia

== Settlements ==
- Caleta Córdoba
- Campamento El Tordillo
- Ciudadela
- Comodoro Rivadavia
- Diadema Argentina
- El Trébol
- Escalante
- General Mosconi
- Laprida
- Palazzo
- Rada Tilly
- Villa Astra
- Villa Ortiz
- Puerto Visser
- Bahia Bustamante
- Rocas Coloradas
- Comferpet
- Pampa del Castillo
- Pampa Salamanca
- Rio Chico
- Pico Salamanca
- Manantiales Behr
