= San Jorge Gulf =

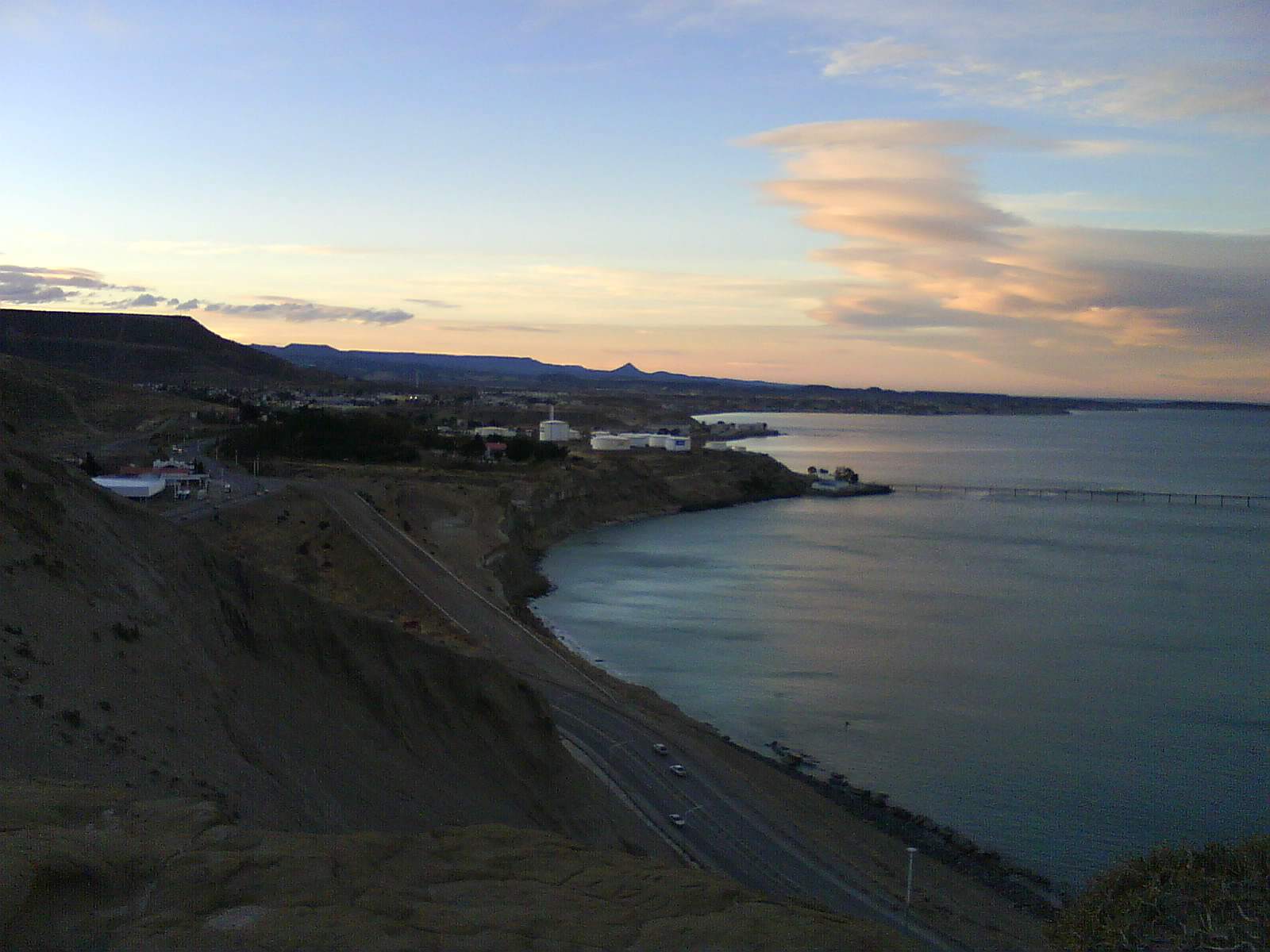

- Location within Santa Cruz Province
- Location: Chubut Province; Santa Cruz Province; Argentina
- Coordinates: 46°04′52″S 66°50′11″W
- Type: Ocean basin
- Max. length: 148 km (92 mi)
- Max. width: 244 km (152 mi)
- Average depth: 85 m (279 ft)
- Residence time: 2 hours
- Settlements: Comodoro Rivadavia; Rada Tilly; Caleta Olivia

The San Jorge Gulf (Golfo San Jorge; Spanish for Gulf of St. George) is a bay in southern Patagonia, Argentina. It is an ocean basin opening to the Atlantic. Its shoreline spans Chubut and Santa Cruz province. The gulf measures approximately 142 miles (229 km) at its mouth and covers approximately 39 square kilometres (15 sq mi). It is located between Cape Dos Bahías and Cape Tres Puntas.

Due to its geography, more than 70% of the gulf's basin is between 70 metres (230 ft) and 100 metres (328 ft) deep. To the south it is about 50 metres (164 ft) 60 metres (197 ft) deep and in the north 90 metres (295 ft). The seabed was formed by bivalves and cirripedial remains, and it consists of mud, sand, gravel, and sand with carbonate.

The mean water temperature varies between 5.09 °C (41 °F) and 13.41 °C (56 °F); salinity is around 33000 ppm.

== Population centers ==
Approximately 90% of Chubut Province's inhabitants live on the coast of the gulf. Comodoro Rivadavia and Caleta Olivia are two larger cities along the coast. Each having ports with oil buoys and fishing facilities.

The fishing towns of Camarones and the seaside resort Rada Tilly also lie along the gulf.

== Industrial production ==
=== Fishing activities ===
Comodoro Rivadavia is ranked within the national and international market as a center of lobsters and spider crabs. Numerous fishing ports function along the bay, as with wharves and marinas for sport fishing and related activities.

=== Industry ===
There is a very good quality metallurgy industry along the bay, much of it related to oil exploration and extraction. The non-conventional resource of a wind farm which provides energy is in its first stages of testing, and once passed, the system will totally be integrated to the main network.

=== Mining ===
The petroleum industry, based on value, is the most important activity along the bay. Oil was discovered here in 1903, and the area remains the nation's second most significant source of oil. The city of Comodoro Rivadavia is the hub of these activities along the bay, including refineries and other development and manufacturing facilities.

The typical shape of pumping equipment, commonly named "Pumpjack," can be seen along much of the plateau of Patagonia. These wells productions supply a large percentage of the national consumption, which has hovered around half a million barrels daily since the 1970s.

=== Energy ===
The production of oil and gas in the San Jorge Gulf covers 5% of the area's economy. The region is also working on alternative sources of energy such as wind power, hydrogen-based energy and a very incipient activity in the development of biofuel.

Wind power generation represents 16% of the energy supply that Comodoro Rivadavia requires. That is satisfied through 18 wind turbines located on Arenales Hill, 14 km (9 mi) away from Comodoro Rivadavia. The wind farm Antonio Morán is the largest in Argentina and the second largest in South America.

The issues regarding hydrogen-based energy are under research in Pico Truncado city, Santa Cruz province, where there is an experimental center.

Another area under research is the production of biofuel from algae of which the results are expected in the long-term. The Energy Center develops projects related to renewable and non-renewable energies.

== Tourism ==
The coast of San Jorge Gulf marks the start of the ocean-to-ocean corridor, a 517 kilometres (321 mi) stretch of land that connects the city of Comodoro Rivadavia in Chubut, Argentina with Chacabuco Port in Chile. This connection is important for commerce and tourism.

Comodoro Rivadavia is an important city in the zone. It has some museums as the Oil Museum, which is located in General Mosconi neighborhood, and the Astra Museum, located in Astra neighbourhood, about 20 kilometres away from the downtown.

Migratory southern right whales can be witnessed from shores.

=== Rada Tilly ===
Rada Tilly is a small town close to the city of Comodoro Rivadavia. Its most important sight is the beach and the variety of activities that you can do there, for example swimming, fishing, windsurfing and scuba diving or just spending some outdoor time at the beach.

There also is a small sea lion reservation, a place where families of sea lions can be seen.
