= Rada Tilly =

- Town
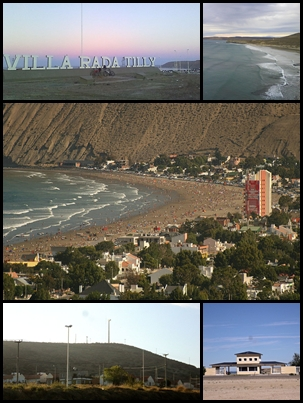
- Top left:A board entrance of Rada Tilly in Armada Argentina Avenue, Top right:Playa Bonita (Bonita Beach), Center:Balneario Rada Tilly (Rada Tilly Spa) in Kae Lei area, Bottom left:Parque Ceolieo Rada Tilly (Rada Tilly Zeolite Park), Bottom right:An entrance in La Herradura Beach (Playa La Herradura)

- Location of Rada Tilly in Argentina
- Coordinates: 45°56′S 67°32′W
- Country: Argentina
- Province: Chubut
- Department: Escalante Department

Government
  - Intendant: Luis Emilio Juncos (Radical Civic Union)

Population
  - Total: 9,226
- Demonym: Radatilense
- Time zone: UTC−3 (ART)
- CPA base: U9001
- Dialing code: +54 0297
- Climate: BSk

Rada Tilly is a town in Escalante Department, Chubut Province (Patagonia), Argentina. The town is between Punta Piedras hill to the north and Punta del Marqués to the south. Punta del Marqués, a geographical landmark on San Jorge Gulf, reaches a height of 167 metres (548 ft), and extends into the sea for 1.5 kilometres (0.93 mi).

The area was first populated at least 9,000 years ago, and was first recorded by Captain Robert FitzRoy during his voyage on HMS Beagle in the early 1830s (best known for its impact on the naturalist Charles Darwin). The municipality was established on July 24, 1948, as part of a nature conservation effort in the area during the administration of President Juan Perón. It was named for the Marquess Francisco Everardo Tilly y Paredes, a Spanish naval captain who defeated Portuguese forces on the Río de la Plata, in 1795; Rada is "roadstead" and also "inlet" in Spanish. The municipality is home to a growing population, which reached 6,208 in the 2001 Census, and has doubled every decade since 1980; its estimated population, per the provincial statistical bureau, was 9,226 in 2008. A beach resort city, Rada Tilly became one of the main recreational spots for visitors from nearby Comodoro Rivadavia, a city 13 kilometres (8.1 mi) to the north. Many people living primarily in Comodoro Rivadavia also own second homes in Rada Tilly. These second homes serve the purpose of a lake home or a cabin for many residents; thus providing an escape from the busy city life of el centro in Comodoro.

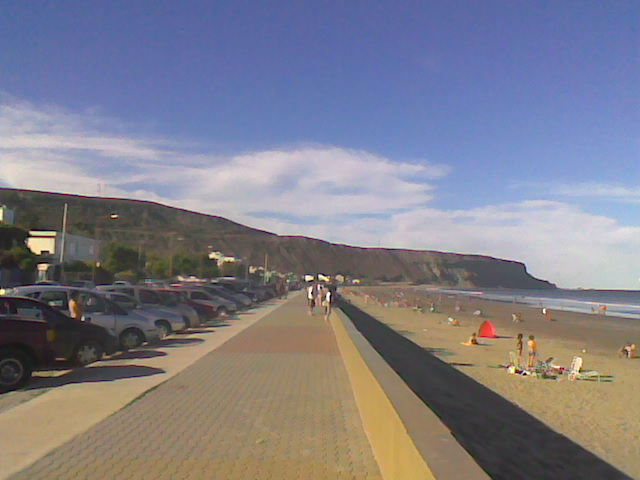
Municipal beach

The main attraction of the city is its coastline, extending for 4.5 kilometres (2.8 mi), covered in fine sand. This uninterrupted geographical feature allows for the enjoyment of numerous leisure activities such as football, beach volleyball, and walking, as well as windsurfing, kitesurfing, diving, snorkeling, trekking, motocross, and mountain bicycling. Landsailing (three-wheeled carts with a sail attached to them that move with the force of the wind) is a popular spectator sport in Rada Tilly, and the 2008 Landsailing World Cup was held on these beaches.

Rada Tilly features one of the longest Seabee seawalls in the world, comparable to that at Blackpool South Shore [UK], but comprising smaller units. The beach is very flat and is very wide at low tide. It is also quite dynamic, with back beach elevation varying by as much as 3m, depending on the season [as derived from photos on Panoramio]. The production techniques evolved by Corporacion Tecnologica Argentina produced over 500 units per shift.

Rada Tilly is also a popular fishing destination, and the wide range of fish includes salmon, hake, and sea bass, among others.

== Wildlife and vegetation ==
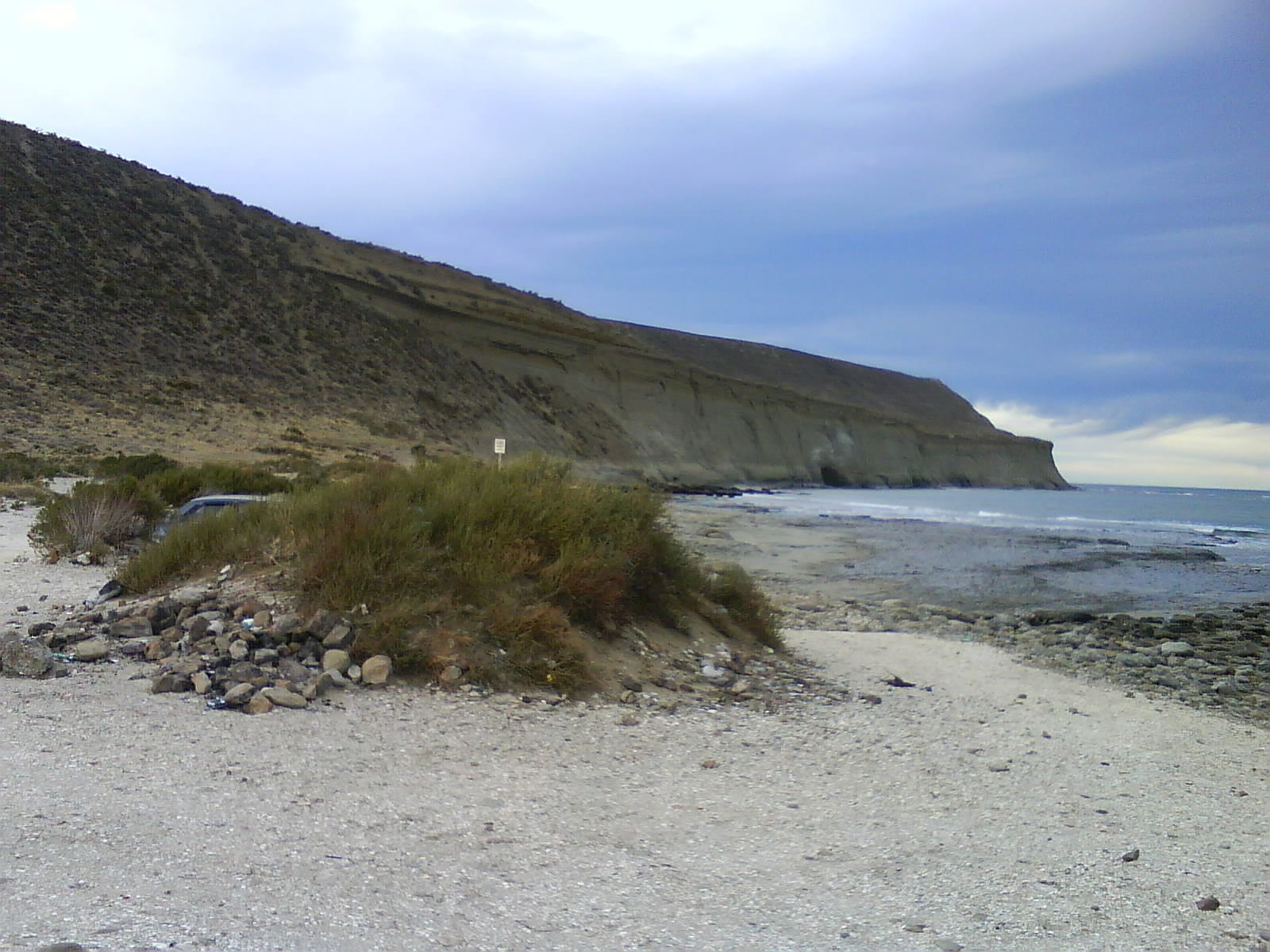
Punta del Marqués

From a lookout point on Punta del Marqués, opened at the site in February 1986, a natural reserve for sea lions can be observed. Other fauna include oysters and seagulls, which frequent the area's coast to feed.

Among the variety of flora found along Punta del Marqués are local species such as uña de gato, zampa, Adesmia, malaspina, duraznillo, and coiro predominate.

== Notable people ==
- Vladimir Covalschi (born 1988), former footballer
- Ignacio Montenegro (born 2004), racing driver
