= General Mosconi, Chubut =

Coordinates: 45°42′S 67°28′W

The General Mosconi neighbourhood is located 3 kilometres (1.9 mi) away from the downtown of Comodoro Rivadavia to the north, in Chubut, Argentina. It had 7.294 inhabitants in 2001.

There are several monuments commemorating important figures such as General Enrique Mosconi, who is its namesake. This place was developed with the oil industry. In the neighbourhood there is a huge variety of places and shops such as supermarkets, clothes stores, DVD rental houses, bakeries, a bank, pharmacies, cafes, ice-cream shops, drugstores, cybers, a post office, schools and even a hospital. The houses and the structure of the buildings are quite quaint, which reflects the past as ex-YPF properties. One of the most popular places in the neighbourhood and in the city is the Club Huergo, in which all the sports and cultural events are held.

It is also famed for its concerts. Another historical place is the Catholic School for boys, Dean Funes School, which is next to the local church Santa Lucia. The development of this neighbourhood took place together with that of the oil activity, which is why the Oil Museum was built here in 1987 by YPF; it is nowadays run by the National University of Patagonia San Juan Bosco. The museum is very important because there is a lot of historical machinery and a replica of the famous Oil Well n° 2, where oil was first discovered in Comodoro Rivadavia in 1907.
