= Cosquín Festival =

Folk music festival in Argentina

Coordinates: 31°14′20″S 64°27′51″W

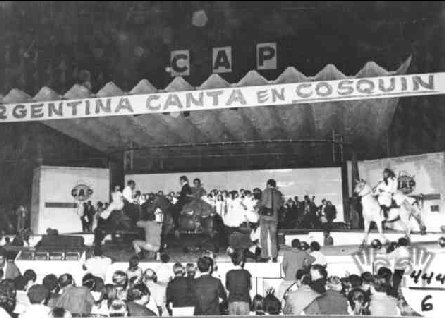
Cosquín: Atahualpa Yupanqui stage, c. 1970

The Cosquín Folk Festival is one of the most important folk music festivals of Argentina, and most important in Latin America.

It lasts nine days and takes place in the second half of January in the city of Cosquín, a scenic, Punilla Valley location in Córdoba Province. The tradition used to refer to nine moons of Cosquín.

== History ==
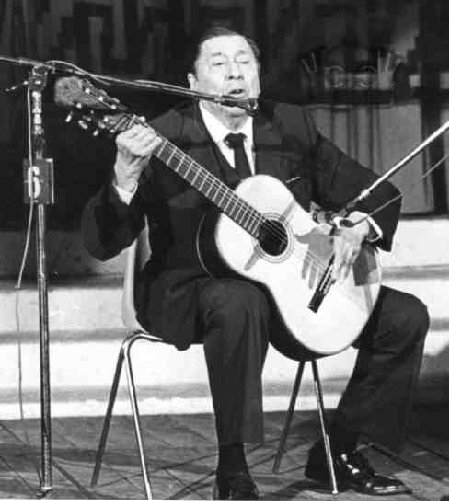
Atahualpa Yupanqui, a symbol of Cosquín. In 1967 he won first prize at the festival, and in 1972, the new stage was named in his honor.

The first festival was held in Cosquín between 21 and 29 January 1961. The initiative came from a group of city residents, led by Dr. Reinaldo Wisner and Dr. Alejandro Guinder, who decided to organize a folklore music and culture show during the summer holidays, in order to attract tourism. The presence of artists from around the country exceeded all expectations, and the festival became the largest annual folk event in the country, as well as one of the most important in Latin America.

The Cosquín Festival unfolded into a boom of folklore music in the 1960s and 1970s, becoming the nation's best-known venue for the characteristic music of the Argentine hinterland (i.e. the country with the exception of the city of Buenos Aires, whose music has traditionally been the tango). Cosquín prompted a renewal of the powerful local folk music among younger listeners in particular, and has persisted in the Argentine musical scene since.

Its organizers then had the good sense to organize Cosquín Festival, not only as a musical competition, but as an integral folk experience, centered on the famous "peñas" outside the official event in which musicians from all backgrounds sing all night, until the candles do not burn". In 1997 the attendees to the festival were estimated in 600,000.

Since the second edition of the festival in 1962, the important Radio Belgrano of Buenos Aires and a network of stations nationwide, began broadcasting Nine Cosquín Moons live, familiarizing millions of listeners in the far-flung country to the festival. After the success of the third edition, President José María Guido, by Decree 1547/63, designated the last week of January as National Folklore Week, and established its headquarters at Cosquín.

Since then the festival has grown in Cosquín national and international repercussions. The Organization of American States (OAS) decided to become a sponsor in recognition of the festival's importance to the culture of the Americas. The Museum of Mankind in Paris has filmed and recorded the festival's multifaceted popular expressions. In Germany, the city of Stuttgart has given the name "Cosquín" to one of its stages, and in 1981, the Japanese city of Kawamata began organizing a festival called "Cosquín en Japón", held annually in October.

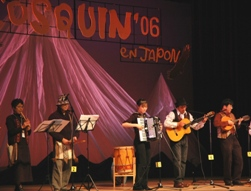
Kawamata: the Cosquín Festival in Japan.

Julio Mahárbiz, the festival's master of ceremonies since 1963, became known for his call at each of the opening nights of the festival's seasons: aquiii Cosquíííínnnn ("Here, Cosquín!"), the inspiration for which Mahárbiz attributed to a style used by a popular football sportscaster at the time, Fioravanti.

In 1967, guitarist Atahualpa Yupanqui won the first prize at the festival and in 1972, a newly completed stage was named in his honor. A feature documentary on the festival, Mire que lindo es mi país (My Country's Beautiful) was produced in 1981. From 1984, on the occasion of the 24th Festival of Cosquín, the public television station Argentina Televisora Color (ATC, now Channel 7), began broadcasting live throughout the country the first two hours of eachmoon, thus helping popularize the event among television viewers.

Throughout its history Cosquín has been the definitive place to leverage the success of the most important artists of the folk music of Argentina, including Mercedes Sosa, León Gieco, Víctor Heredia, Eduardo Falú, Los Chalchaleros, Los Fronterizos, Los Cantores del Alba, Los Cuatro de Córdoba, Los Tucu Tucu, Los de Salta, Julia Elena Dávalos, Ramona Galarza, María Ofelia, Soledad Pastorutti, Argentino Luna, Gustavo Leguizamón, Antonio Tormo, and, among many others, comic narrator Luis Landriscina and Los Indios Tacunau, a duo who became known for their rousing rendition of the patriotic San Lorenzo march.

In 2001, a new arena was completed, with a 50-meter-long stage totaling and 830 m^{2} in surface area. The stage can rotate 180 degrees to expedite the schedule of performances.

With this infrastructure, Cosquín currently has one of the largest stages in Latin America. In total, the amphitheater has a capacity of nearly 10,000 spectators, of whom 7,800 sitting in the seats of the central field, and 2,000 people are located on both side galleries.

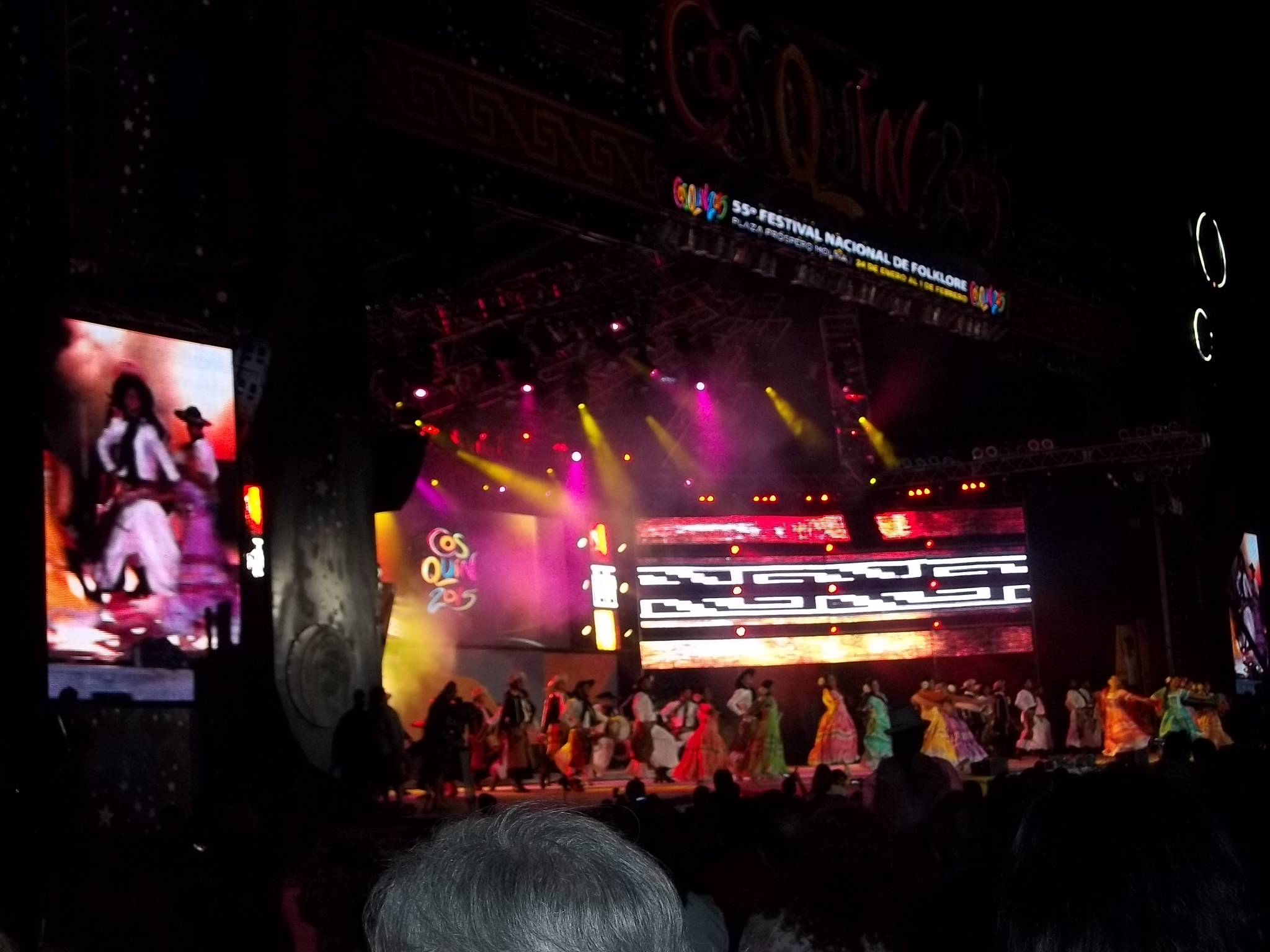
Stage at the Cosquín Festival, whose large screens magnify the view of the performances.

In 2010 the festival celebrated its 50th anniversary with a tribute to Mercedes Sosa, featuring Teresa Parodi, León Gieco, Víctor Heredia, Jairo and Peteco Carabajal. Other performers that year included Los Huayra, Soledad, Argentino Luna, Los Tekis, Jorge Fandermole, Arbolito, Pablo Milanés and Inti-Illimani.

The Atahualpa Yupanqui Stage is located on Próspero Molina Square. This site was named after one of the founders of Cosquín, who lived between 1827 and 1889.

== Cosquín Nine Moons ==
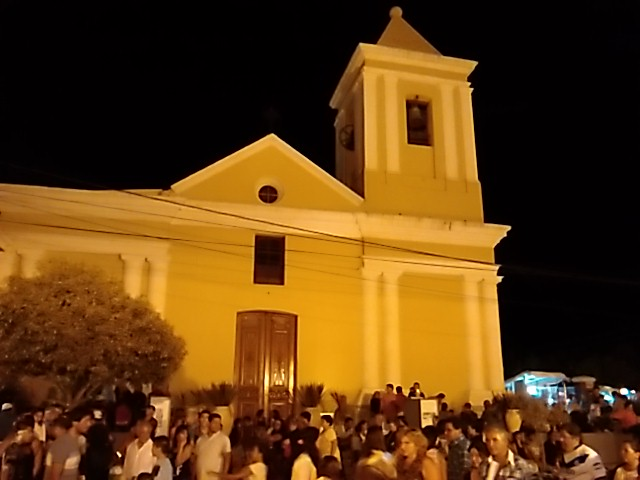
The parish church facing the Próspero Molina amphitheatre, with the street crowded with festivalgoers during the nine festival nights.

The Cosquín Nine Moons are organized as an experience that has its center at the festival, but goes beyond it to become a truly integral folk experience.

Some of the activities taking place during the nine days are:

- Cosquín Festival of Song
- Performances by professional folklorists.
- Performances of folk dance ballets.
- The famous "boulders": tents where artists interact with the public, as well as tents and bonfires by the river, where revelers sing and dance nonstop.
- The Congress of Man in Argentina and Our Culture: There are courses and workshops for children and adults. Expose and teach artisans, artists, scholars, scientists. It offers courses in native languages such as Quechua and Guaraní.
- The Augusto Raúl Cortázar National Exhibition of Crafts and Folk Art, named after one of the most important scholars of Argentine folklore.

That spirit that characterizes folk Cosquín in nine days and nights the festival that lasts has been dubbed the duende coscoíno ("Cosquín elf").

== Cosquín anthem ==
The festival has an official anthem titled "Cosquín empieza a cantar" ("Cosquín Begins to Sing"), composed by Zulema Alcayaga and Waldo Belloso; the final stanza of the hymn reads:

The bells soar to the sky
Repeating the name that unites us:
Cosquín, Cosquín, Cosquín, Cosquín,
Cosquín, Cosquín.
Come see the miracle
Cosquín starts singing.

== Awards and recognition ==
In 1995 the festival received a special mention from the Konex Foundation in recognition of its invaluable contribution to Argentine popular music.

== See also ==
- Folklore
- Argentine culture
- Tourism in Argentina
- Cosquín en Japón
- Cosquín Rock
- History of folkloric music in Argentina
