= Tsunemasa =

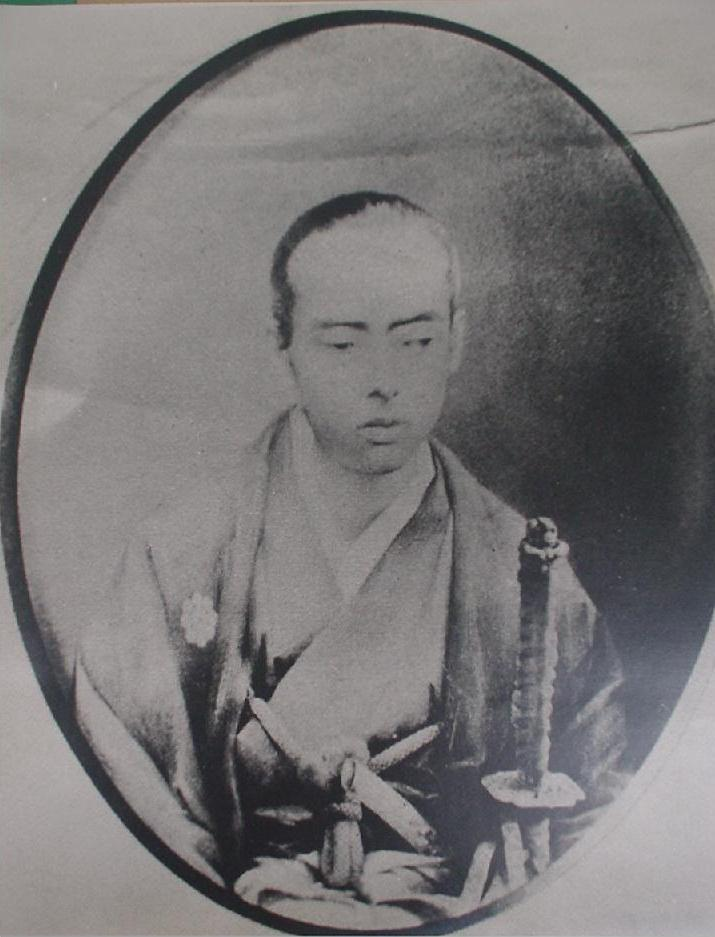
- Tsunemasa Kikkawa (1829–1867), Japanese samurai
- Pronunciation: tsɯnemasa (IPA)
- Gender: Male

Origin
- Origin: Japanese
- Meaning: Different meanings depending on the kanji used

Other names
- Alternative spelling: Tunemasa (Kunrei-shiki) Tunemasa (Nihon-shiki) Tsunemasa (Hepburn)

Tsunemasa is a masculine Japanese given name.

== Written forms ==
Tsunemasa can be written using different combinations of kanji characters. Here are some examples:

- 常正, "usual, righteous"
- 常政, "usual, politics"
- 常昌, "usual, clear"
- 常将, "usual, commander"
- 常雅, "usual, elegant"
- 常真, "usual, reality"
- 恒正, "always, righteous"
- 恒政, "always, politics"
- 恒昌, "always, clear"
- 恒将, "always, commander"
- 恒雅, "always, elegant"
- 恒真, "always, reality"
- 庸正, "common, righteous"
- 庸政, "common, politics"
- 庸昌, "common, clear"
- 庸将, "common, commander"
- 毎正, "every, righteous"
- 毎政, "every, politics"
- 毎昌, "every, clear"
- 毎将, "every, commander"

The name can also be written in hiragana つねまさ or katakana ツネマサ.

== Notable people with the name ==
- Tsunemasa Iwasaki (岩崎 常正, 1786–1842), Japanese botanist, zoologist, and entomologist.
- Tsunemasa Kawamata (川又 常正, birth and death dates unknown), eighteenth-century Japanese artist.
