= Jan Kopp =

German visual artist

Jan Kopp (born May 26, 1970, in Frankfurt/Main, Germany) is a German visual artist. He has lived in France since 1991.

== Overview ==
After graduating in 1996 from National School of Fine Arts of Paris / École nationale supérieure des Beaux-Arts/, France, he became assistant to the artists fr:Jochen Gerz and fr:Esther Shalev Gerz. In 1997 he co-founded the independent art-space GlassBox in Paris, one of the first artist-run-spaces in the French capital. Jan Kopp has been in several international artist-in-residence programs such as PS1/Moma with the Clockwork 2000: P.S.1 & Clocktower National and International Studio Program 1999-2000 in New York and Hors les Murs/Institut Français in Brazil with "Niemeyer dancing, playing with modernity, run the streets" as a subject of his residence in 2014.

== Work ==
Jan Kopp uses different medias – drawing, sound, video, sculpture, performance, - without favoring one or the other. He resists to any temptation of specialization or classification. His works can be small drawings or large-scale installations such as Soulever le monde, created for the Children's gallery of Centre Pompidou, Paris in 2015 or Grand Ensemble for the Contemporary art center La Criée in Rennes, France. In the most of large-scale installations, the visitor can take part of the work by touching or making in movement one element of it or only by this presence. For instance Das endlose Spiel / The Endless game challenges the visitor as to the nature of both his role and his participation: he can take part in this interplay of tension between the visible and the sensory only by making his way along the ellipse of "Das endlose Spiel's" platform. As Gaétane Lamarche-Vadel said, Kopp shares with Kawamata inclinations for simple materials, economic, common, clear paths, the incompleteness of the work, make a collective.
Most of times, he uses many everyday objects to speak to everyone by putting them out of their usual context. By this move we can see the world differential, the artist says. Jan Kopp seeks to create artworks which don't reveal themselves in one glance. They could appear in one way to the visitor then show a different side or give new meanings another day. The visitors don't see the same thing. The artist is always in a position to create links between art, territory and society. A major exhibition was devoted to him at the Maubuisson abbey (Val d’Oise, France) in 2011. Le Tourniquet (2011), the fruit of an experiment on the drawing medium, can be visited in three places, the Collège des Bernardins in Paris, at Fresnoy in the group exhibition Visions fugitives and at the FRAC Alsace for Affinités déchirures & attractions.
In 2015, Jan Kopp, was selected to develop an artistic research in Mulhouse (France) and Kassell (Germany) on the topic of immigration, social memory and expressions of living together in the city. He worked closely with civil society actors, academics and cultural Mulhouse.

== Solo exhibitions ==
- 2015 : Soulever le monde Children's gallery of the Centre Georges Pompidou, Paris, France
- 2015 : Constellations ordinaires, Laurence Bernard Gallery, Geneva, Switzerland
- 2013 : Un grand ensemble and Les horizons, La Criée, Contemporary art center, Rennes, France
- 2011 : La courbe ritournelle, Contemporary art center, Abbaye de Maubuisson, France
- 2010 : Das endlose Spiel / Le jeu sans fin, Kunstraum Dornbirn, Austria
- 2009 : "Kammerspiel", Martos Gallery, New York, NY
- 2008 : fr:Fonds régional d'art contemporain (FRAC) Alsace, France
- 2008 : Centre d’art Bastille, Grenoble, France

== Group exhibitions ==
- 2014 : Ligne de front, Lab Labanque- Artois comm, Givenchy-lès-la-Bassée, France
- 2013 : Le Nouveau Festival, Centre Georges Pompidou, Paris, France
- 2011 : Architecture, Utopies, Dessin, MNAC, Bucharest, Romania
- 2010 : Res Publica, MMOMA, Moscou, Russia
- 2010 : "Fragile, Terres d'empathie", Daejeon Museum of Art, Daejeon, South Korea
- 2009 : Fragile, Contemporary art Museum, St Etienne
- 2008 : Translation, MMOMA, Moscou, Russia
- 2008 : Crisi, Angels Barcelona, Spain
- 2005 : Singuliers, Modern Art Museum, Canton, China
- 2004 : I need You, Kunsthaus Biel/Bienne, Suisse
- 2002 : Traversée, Paris Modern Art Museum, France
- 2001 : Sixth Biennial of Contemporary Art of Lyon, France
- 2000 : Clockwork, PS1/MOMA, New York, USA.

== Public collections ==
- Im Treibhaus, Collection Neuflize Vie ABN / AMRO
- Quelques mouvements cycliques, Collection publique d'art contemporain du Conseil général de la Seine-Saint-Denis, France
- News from an unbuilt city, Fonds National d'Art Contemporain, Paris, France. Currently part of the permanent collection in MAC Lyon, France
- Drawings for "No Paraderan," Fonds National d'Art Contemporain, Paris France
- Taming the Alien/Final Races, Fonds National d'Art Contemporain, Paris, France
- Westlich, Fonds National d'Art Contemporain, Paris, France
- Amoco, Frac Ile-de-France, France
- Monstres (rep.), Frac Ile-de-France, France
- Nowherelands, Frac Champagne-Ardenne, France

== Bibliography ==
=== Monographs ===
- 2015: Jan Kopp - Soulever le monde - Editions Filigranes (Centre Pompidou-Paris et La Criée, centre d'art contemporain, Rennes), Paris, 80 pages, Tanguy Viel's textes
- 2011: Jan Kopp - La Courbe de la ritournelle - Editions Filigranes, Paris, 96 pages, 2011
- 2010: Jan Kopp : Das endlose Spiel - Le jeu sans fin- Verlag für moderne Kunst Nürnberg, 2010
- 2005: Jan Kopp : Techniques Rappolder - Boulbes .C, Claustres .A, Lageira .J, Isthme éditions, Paris, 127 pages, 2005
- 2000: Ausgestellt / Vorgestellt V - Marl, Skulpturenmuseum Glaskasten, 2000
- 1998: Jan Kopp - Paris, Glassbox, 1998

=== Collectif catalogs and books ===
- 2015: Suspended Spaces #3. Inachever la Modernité. Editions d'école des Beaux Arts de Paris
- 2014: A posteriori - 10 ans centre d'art contemporain, La Maréchalerie, Versailles,
- 2013: Chronique du chantier - Gaëtane Lamarche-Vadel, Les presses du réel, 320 pages, 2013

Pièces montrées - Frac Alsace, Musée de la Ville de Strasbourg, Fondation Fernet-Branca, textes d’Olivier Grasser,..., 184 pages, 2013 Théâtre des expositions 3 : Il retro del manifesto - Académie de France à Rome – Villa Medicis, avec les oeuvres de Katinka Bock, Ulla von Brandenburg, Laurent Montaron,...., 92 pages, 2013

- 2011: Suspended Spaces #2 - Une expérience collective, Black Jack Editions, 272 pages, 2012

Question d'artistes - interview with Alain Berland : "Une production en négatif", Collège des Bernardins, Paris

- 2011: Suspended Spaces #1 - textes de Victor Burgin, Françoise Coblence, Claire Mauss Copeaux et Etienne Copeaux, Jacinto Lageira, Seloua Luste Boulbina, Paul Ardenne, Lionel Ruffel, Etienne Balibar, Ghislaine Glasson Deschaumes, Françoise Parfait ... Black Jack Editions, 300 pages, 2011
- 2010: Un plan simple, Paris, B42 - Cedric Schönwald, Florence Ostende, Remi Parcollet, Maxime Thieffine, 148 pages, 2010
- 2009: Fragile - Terres d'empathie / fields of empathy - Saint-Etienne, musée d'art moderne, Milan, Skira editore, 2009

Collection - Musee d’art contemporain de Lyon, 5 Continents Editions, Milan, 2009

- 2008: Remakes, Video sobre Cine - Fondacion municipal de cultura, Gijon, 2008

4 AM - quatre ans d'art à la Maréchalerie - La Maréchalerie - Centre d'art contemporain et Archibooks + sautereau éditeur, 87 pages, 2008

- 2007: Photographies Modernes et Contemporaines : La Collection Neuflize Vie - de Régis Durand, Dominique Baqué, Flammarion Éditions, 166 pages, 2007

F.I.S.Co. - Today is ok, Éditions - Xing, 2007 The Lost Moment - Bik Van der Pol, 2007

- 2006: Festival photo et vidéo de Biarritz - Isthme éditions, Mai 2006
- 2005: Catalogue de la collection publique du Conseil Général de la Seine-Saint-Denis - CG93, Jeanne van der Portal, 2005

Only Connect - Ramade B., Froger G., Goudinoux V., Renau O., Balau R., Isthme éditions - Art Connexion, Dec. 2005 Singuliers - Musée d'Art du Guangdong, 2005

- 2004: Célébration! 20 ans du FRAC Champagne-Ardenne - Le Collège édition / Frac Champagne-Ardenne, 2004

Projet Cône Sud - FRAC Ile de France et FRAC Poitou Charente, 2004 Cosmique Bled Ou des corps mobiles dans l'espace – Ateliers des Arques -Musée Zakdine, Paris, 2004 I need you - Centre PasquArt Kunsthaus Centre d'art, Bienne, Suisse, 2004

- 2003: L'oeil de la nuit - Nuit blanche parcours Paris rive gauche, Paris Musées, 2003
- 2002: L'art politique - Ecole d'art de Brest, 2002

Ateliers 19972002 - Centre national de la photographie, p. 30-32, 2002 True Truth about the nearly Real - Künstlerhaus Mousonturm (4th International Summer Academy), 2002

- 2001: Traversées - Paris, ARC - Musée d'Art Moderne de la Ville de Paris, 2001

Connivence - Biennale de Lyon, 2001 Paysages d'entre-villes - Paris, Musée Zadkine, 2001 Clockwork 2000 - New York, PS1, 2000

- 2000: Fido : télévision - Hunter College Art Gallery, New York, 2000

La Ville, le jardin, la Mémoire - Rome, Villa Médicis, 2000

- 1993-99: Nous nous sommes tant aimés - Paris, École nationale supérieure des Beaux-Arts, 1999

Entre fictions - Arles, Actes Sud, 1998

Contes à rebours - Kunsthalle Palazzo, Liestal, Jahreskatalog, 1998

Caravan 96 - Taegu, 1996

Monument et modernité - Paris, Délégation aux Arts Plastiques - Ville de Paris, 1996

Traces sonores - Paris, École nationale supérieure des Beaux-Arts, 1995

Traces 12 - Paris, École nationale supérieure des Beaux-Arts, 1993
