= Water supply problems in Caleta Olivia 2014 =

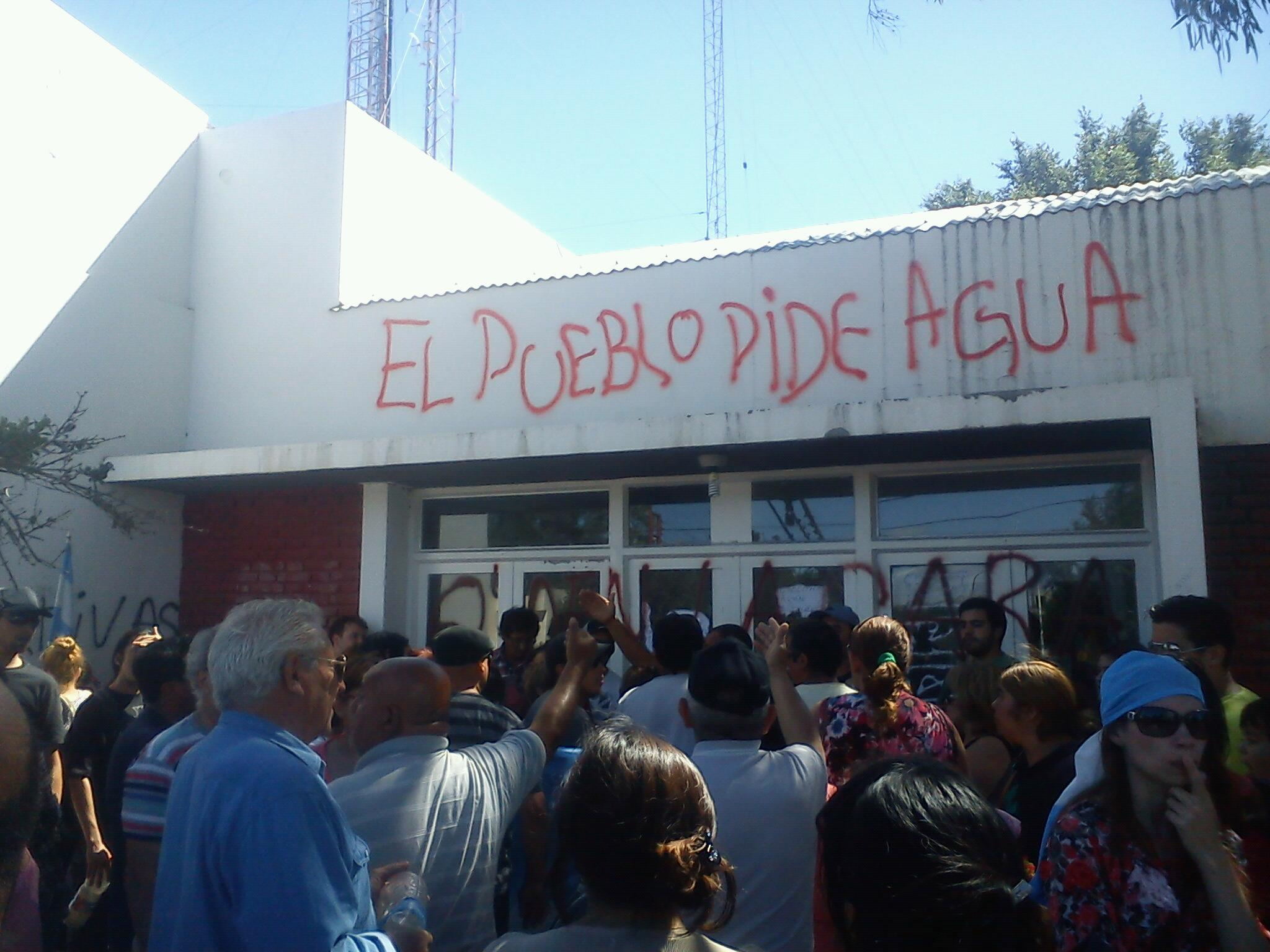
- Demonstration at Caleta Olivia Town Hall (The graffiti says: "The people demand water")
- Date: 10 February 2014; 28 February 2014
- Location: Argentina
- Participants: 3,000 local people
- Website: newspaper article

Water supply problems in Caleta Olivia occurred on 2014 (called the Thirst Days) and culminated in a series of protests about the lack of water produced by the rupture of the aqueduct Jorge Carstens. The Sarmiento, Comodoro Rivadavia and Rada Tilly areas of Argentina were affected. The water shortage began on 10 February with a rupture near ti Cerro Dragón (Dragon Hill). This issue left the area of San Jorge Gulf without water.

== Origin ==
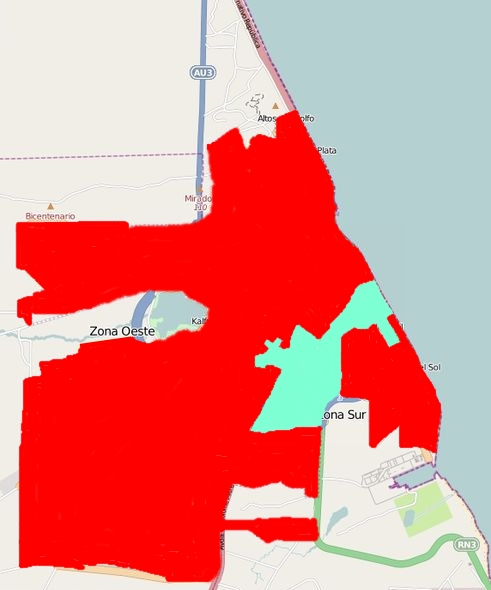
In red: areas where there was no water. In blue, areas where water was obtained from Cañadón Quintar and Meseta Espinoza.

Once the first breakdown at Cerro Dragón (Dragon Hill) was repaired on 11 February, the aqueduct broke again near Valle Hermoso (Beautiful valley). This issue created a longer-lasting lack of water that affected the area until 17 February. The moment that the pipes were refilled with drinking water new punctures and cracks appeared at the Caleta Olivia area. This issue mainly occurred because when pipes are not carrying water inside they tend to contract; once the pressure of water returns the expansion of the tubes makes them burst. From 1999 the aqueduct accumulated more than 550 cracks and punctures in its 77 km section from Cerro Arenales (Arenales Hill) to Caleta Olivia. This damage was mainly caused by the low-quality materials used in the construction of the aqueduct. In Comodoro Rivadavia, the water supply is interrupted during weekends due to the high water consumption rates of industry, the Argentine Army, and the local population.

== Dispute ==
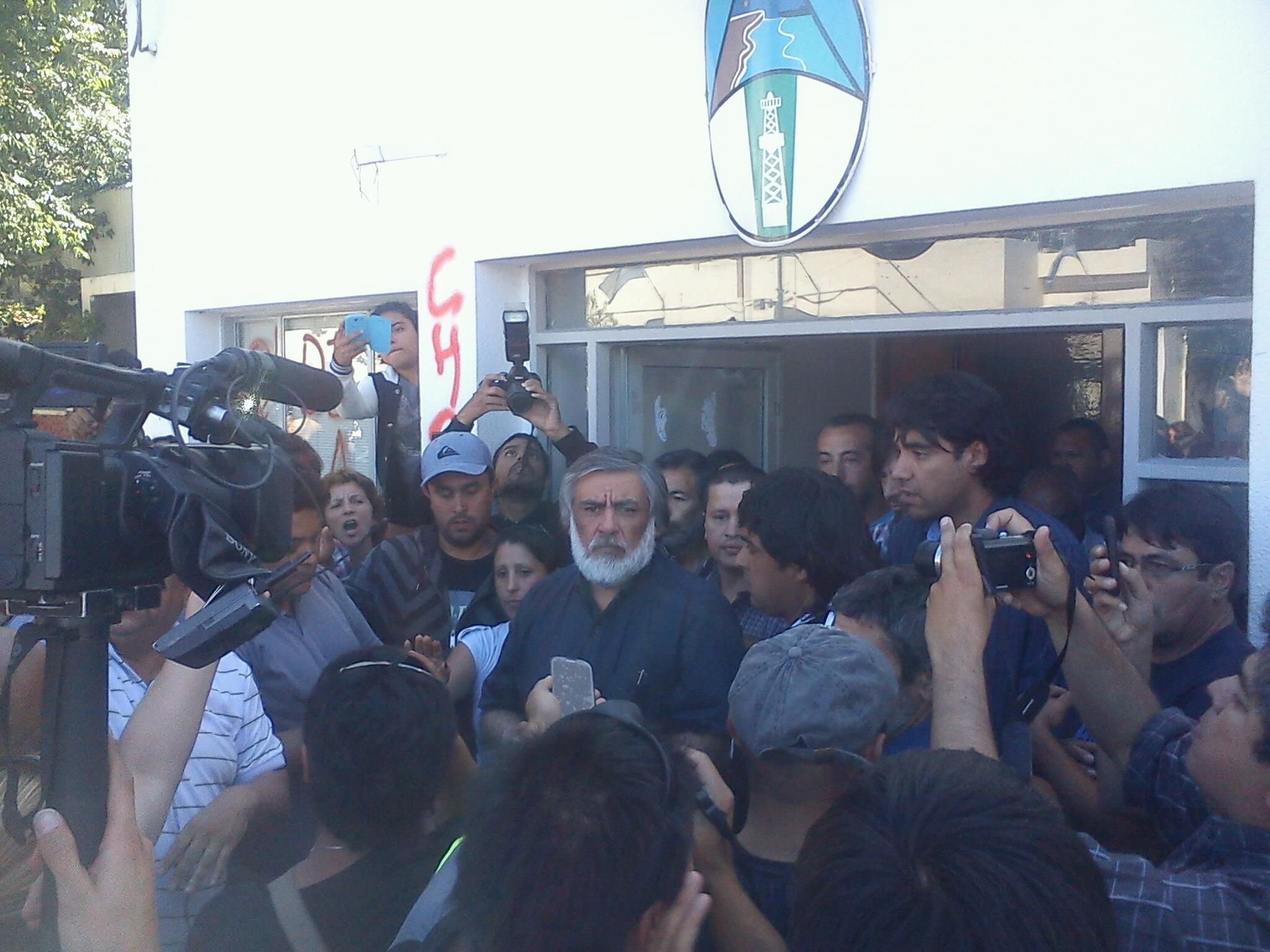
Mayor José Córdoba's speech.

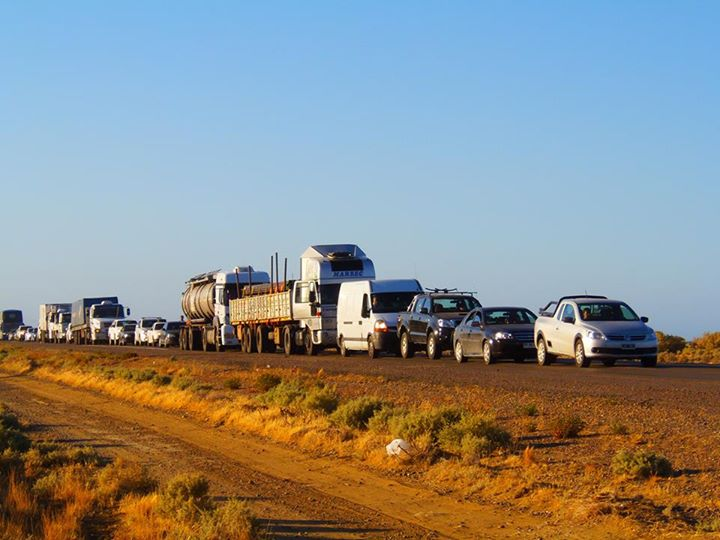
Traffic jams cause by the road blockades.

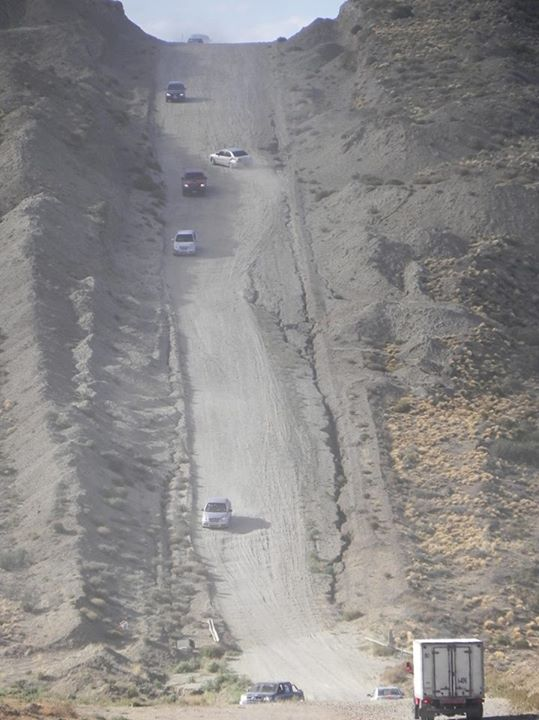
Alternative roads used by drivers to avoid blockades.

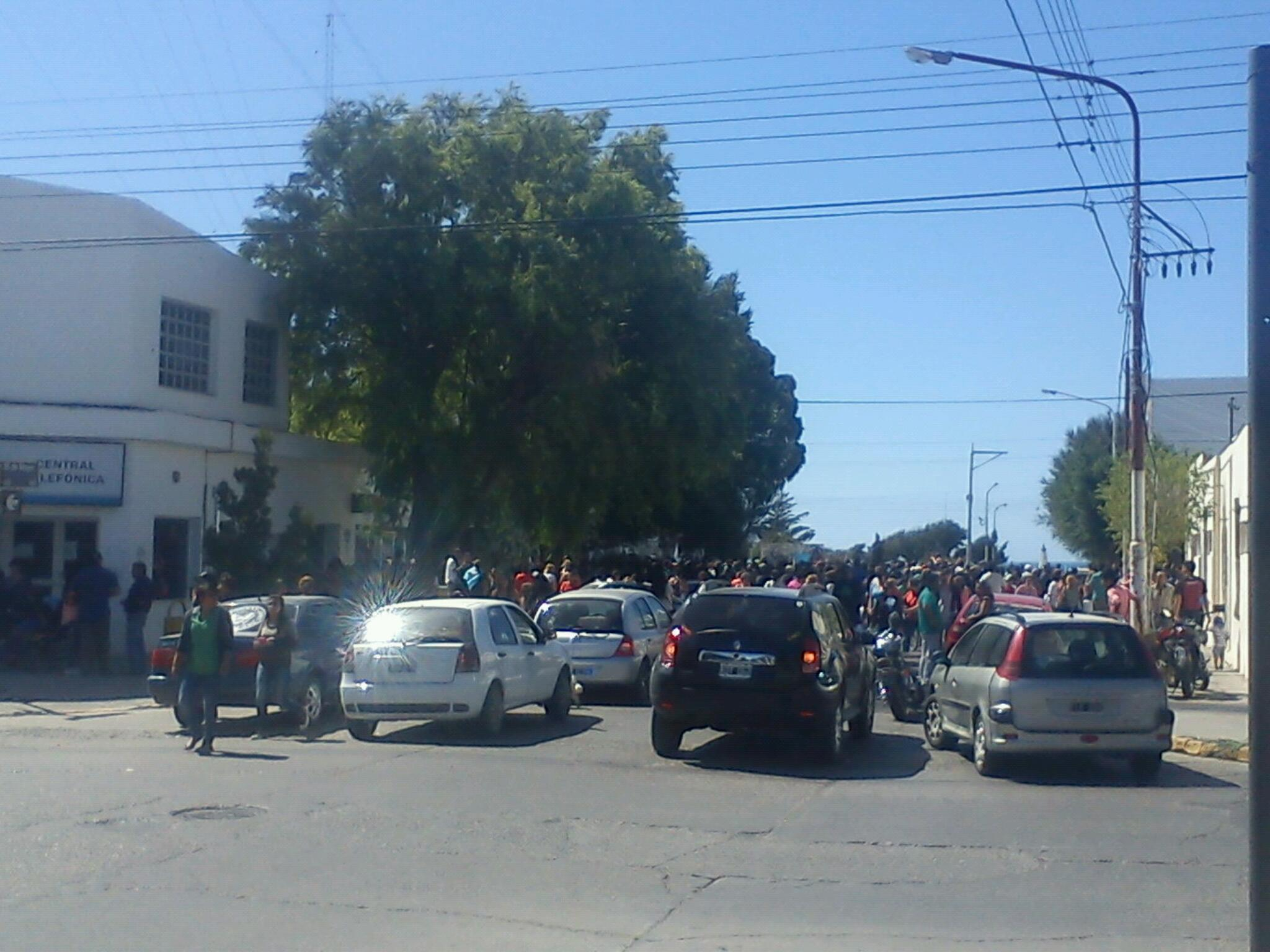
Protests in front of the Town Hall.

The State Society of Public Services ("Servicios Públicos Sociedad del Estado" in Spanish) gave very little information about the incident. This provoked some 3,000 self-motivated people to protest, calling for the restoration of the precious water supply. The picketers carried banners, blocked streets and avenues, the Town Hall and the National Road number 3 (RN 3) at the city's northern access. The residents who took part in the protest were demanding action from the Mayor to solve the problem. Most of the population had to use seawater to clean up their homes. After the debate between the Mayor and the people it was decided to keep the RN 3 blockade (main communication road for the east Patagonian region) until the governor of the Santa Cruz Province, Daniel Peralta reached Caleta Olivia to find a definitive solution to the conflict. Other problems were exacerbated by the lack of water: sewer systems collapsed, there was a lack of public transport, banks and public offices closed, hospitals provided just minimum services, and production at a few oil wells halted due to the strikes.

== Aqueduct ==
The Jorge Carstens aqueduct promised 100 years of proper operation, with a capacity of 115 million litres per day. Since 1999 the issues that troubled normal functionality were:

- Population increased (from 36,077 to 68,691).
- Water volume flow increased (from 2,600,000 to 22,000,000).
- Poor and defective pipe material.
- Sabotage.
- Poor system administration.
- Delays in the construction of a parallel aqueduct to ease the problem.
- Filed promise to build a new aqueduct to bring water from Lake Buenos Aires to supply the northern region of Santa Cruz with water.

This aqueduct area is usually visible from the Comodoro Rivadavia – Caleta Olivia motorway, which connects around 300,000 inhabitants, so every time a puncture occurs it is easy to locate. In 2013 an agreement was signed to improve the regional aqueduct system from Musters Lake – [Comodoro Rivadavia] – Rada Tilly – Caleta Olivia. The company responsible for this was the National Entity for Hydrological and Sanitation Works (in Spanish, "ENOHSA"). Mr. Lucio Tamburo presented the plans for the parallel aqueduct, assuring that it was estimated to be finished in between August and September. The plan he suggested was:

- Replacement of 46 kilometres of pipe (PRFV DN 600 and 700 mm).
- Improvement of 5 pumping stations.
- A new water-treatment plant.
- An increase of 45% in drinking water production.
- Dragon Hill – Arenales Hill section: A third parallel pipe with PRFV DN 500, 400 y 350 mm.
- Sarmiento – Black Hill section: New 25 km piping with a diameter in between 600 mm to 700 mm.

== Emergency ==
On 15 February, due to the demonstrations and the lack of water, the Council declared the city under a state of "hydric emergency". After this Daniel Peralta and the local government declared the same state for the entire province. The long lasting emergency caused the Argentine Army to increase efforts to supply the city population with drinking water. The local people, together with some local authorities, requested that the provincial government upgrade the status to disaster area.

== Responses ==
The cabinet chief Jorge Capitanich said that "there were eight ruptures" in the aqueduct which "has issues and ruptures that are in process to be repaired, in the majority of districts". The governor Daniel Peralta declared the city in water emergency on behalf of the province and said that he would request authorization from the legislature to draw credit for $140,000,000 to buy equipment, to build an aqueduct for the water wells at Cañadón Seco ("Dry Ravine") and for the construction of a [reverse osmosis plant] that will generate 5,000,000 litres of water per day. Fernando Cotillo, the vice-governor, criticised the townsfolk for their complaints and said that the roadblocks were doing no good to the problem; he also visited the affected area. The mayor of Caleta Olivia, José Manuel Córdoba, denied rumours of resignation and he criticised the people who took part in the RN 3 roadblock. He also announced that 900,000 m^{3} of water was to be distributed using 17 trucks. The city councillor Juan Erwin Bolívar Acuña Kunz said that he would ask for reports if the solutions did not reach the city. MP Estela Bubola criticised the government; she said that it was obscene to expend more than $20,000,000 on a party at El Calafate while in Caleta Olivia there is no water. She requested an urgent session for the provincial council legislature in Caleta Olivia. She also criticized the mayor of El Calafate. The provincial education council suspended all school activities for all of February at Caleta Olivia, Cañadón Seco, Jaramillo and Fitz Roy. ENOHSA informed on 20 February that the parallel aqueduct construction was 20% completed. The Council workers and employees union and the private oil workers of the Santa Cruz union requested the authorities to "face the problem". The secretary of the latest union also complained about the oil drilling companies. The Council Assembly for Civil Protection wrote a letter to the governor requesting "his prompt intervention". Omar Latini, the head of the Workers Party in Santa Cruz laid a charge of "unfulfillment of public servant duties" against the mayor, governor and his cabinet. A group of local people endorsed a request demanding the presence of Governor Peralta and requested to the council an impeachment for the local mayor.

== Aid ==
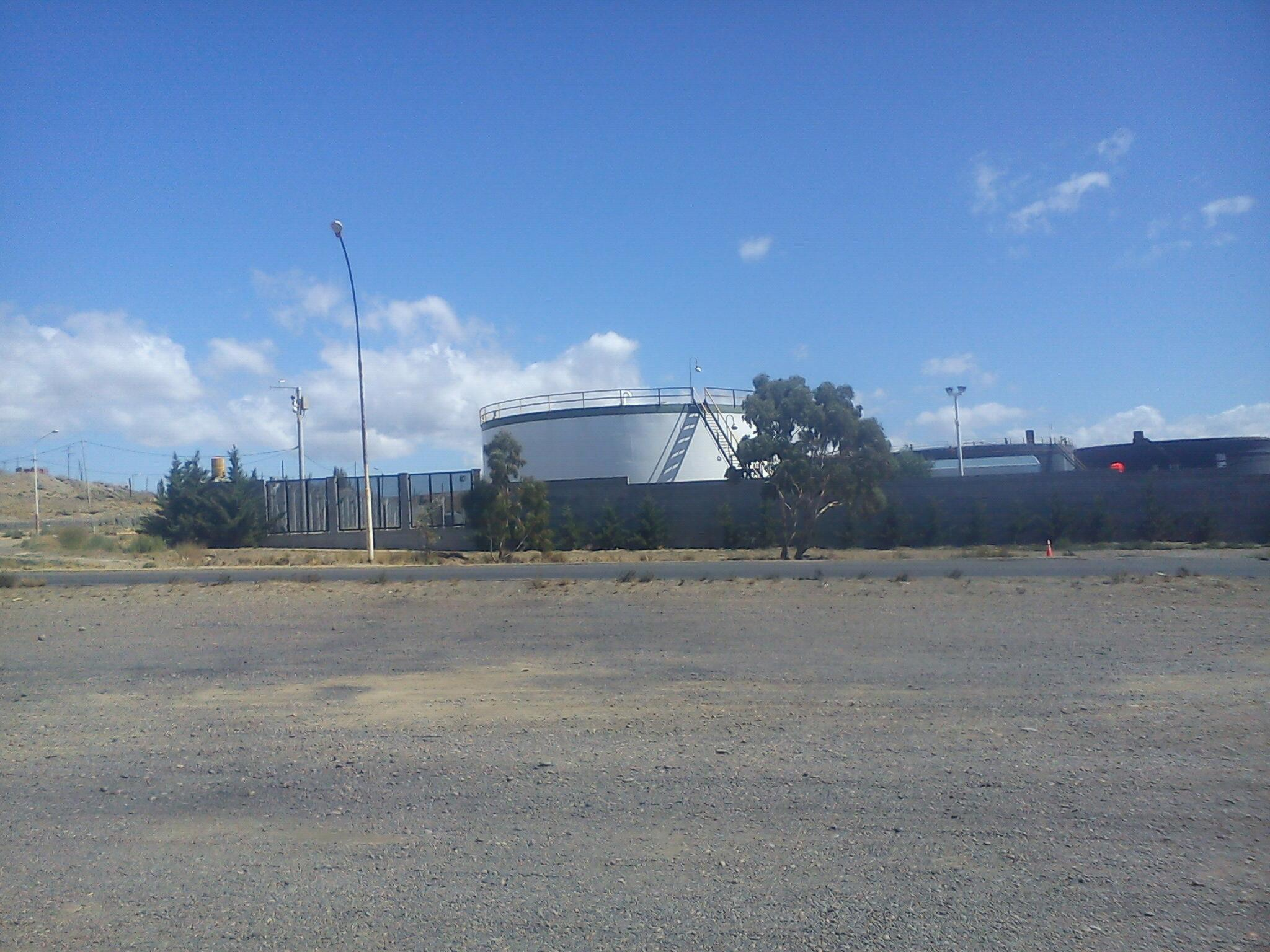
5000 m3 reserve located at YPF fields.

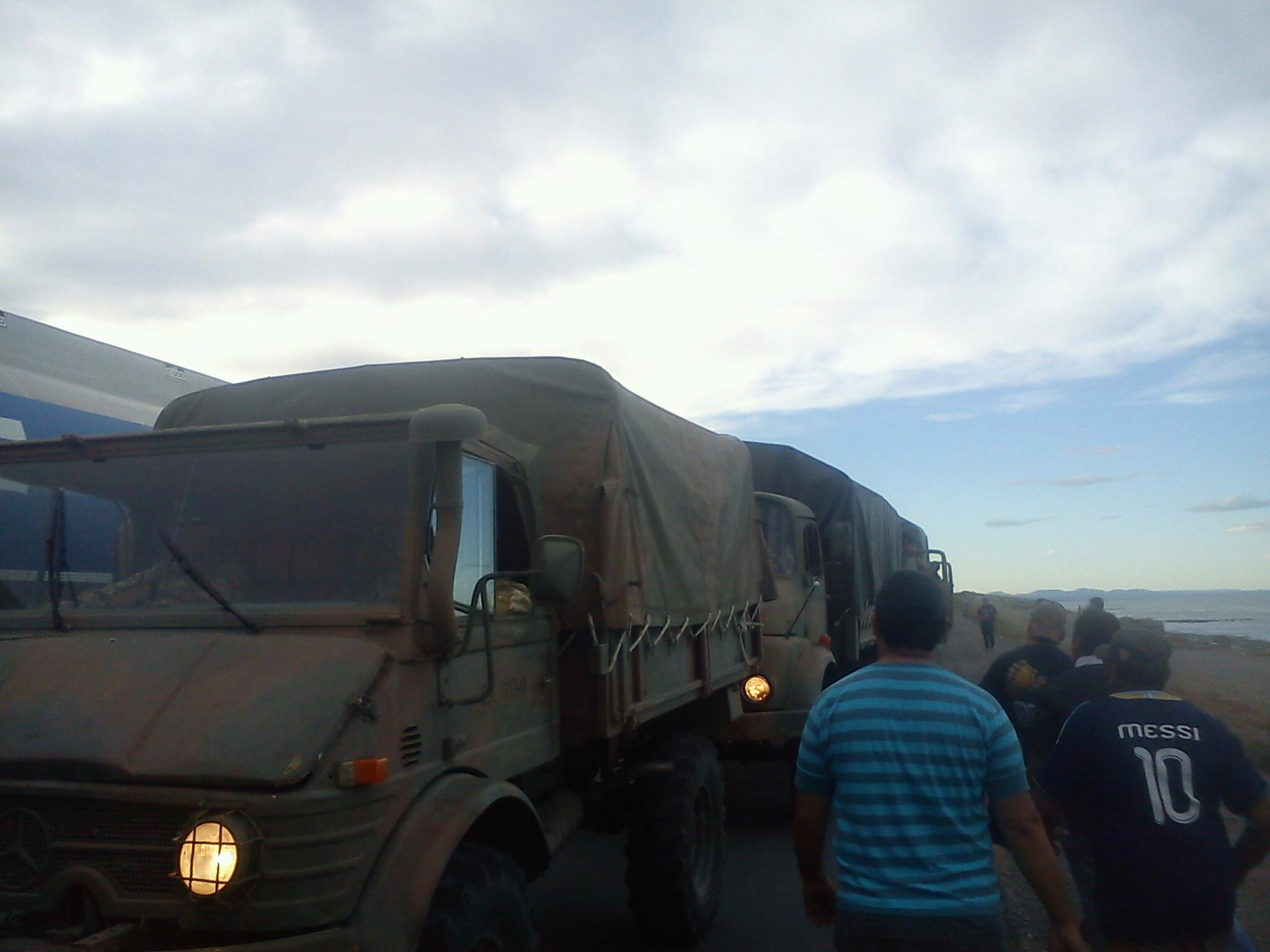
Trucks from the Mechanic Brigade Command IX reaching the city.

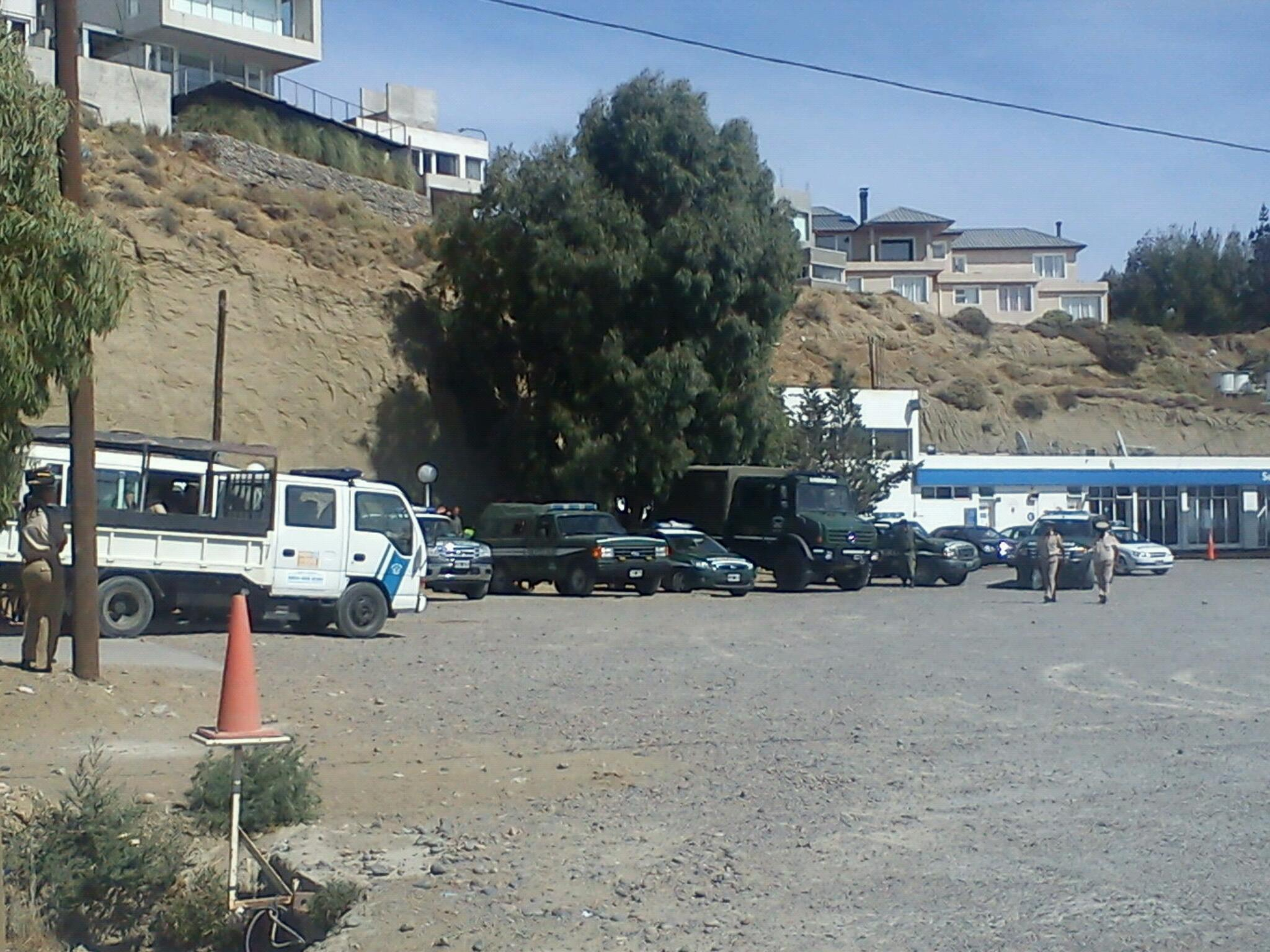
Argentine National Gendarmerie deployed at the north access.

Due to the lack of water in the city, several companies, shops, unions and organizations sent bottled water and food to the city. A description of some of them is below:

- La Anónima supermarket made a donation of 4,000 litres of bottled mineral water.
- The oil company Instalex distributed 5,500 litres using a company truck.
- The 86 battalion "Aonikenk" of the Argentinean explorers of Don Bosco, collaborated with the General direction for Civil Protection for area XI, taking care of calls, receipt of goods, unloading and delivery of drinking water drums.
- The Union Front for a Better Living (Radical Civic Union) began a campaign to help the city to collect drinking water from several province towns.
- Several stores collaborated in the distribution of food to the people that were blocking the roads.
- Several cities from the [San Jorge Gulf] Basin offered tanker trucks to be used in Caleta Olivia; two from each of Comodoro Rivadavia, Perito Moreno, Pico Truncado, and one from Río Gallegos.
- YPF donated 6,000 litres of drinking water in 8 litres drums, and also added several tanker trucks from different services companies from Comodoro Rivadavia, Pico Truncado and Las Heras.
- The Teachers' Union (in Spanish, "ADOSAC") donated bottled water at their filial in Caleta Olivia.
- New Generation FM, from Pico Truncado donated 92,000 litres of drinking water for the Pedro Tardivo Hospital.
- Radical Civic Union councilors from Los Antiguos, Pico Truncado and Las Heras made donations of water and they also presented demands about the water problem.
- The center of the students from Santa Cruz in La Plata participated in a collection of drinking water that was sent to the affected city.

=== Argentine Army ===
- The regiment of Mechanized Infantry 8 collaborated with 4,000 litres of drinking water and trucks to assist in the distribution.
- Use of a water purification plant located at Novosel fields to supply the Zona de Chacras area and settlements.
- Use of a reverse osmosis plant (for desalination) brought from Bahía Blanca, installed on 23 February in the area of Caleta Paula port, 14 marines and personnel from the ministry were taking care of the coordination of the resources deployment.
- The Mechanic Brigade Command sent 7 troops with 3 water purifiers (one as reserve) with a production capacity of 10,000 litres of drinking water per hour. These purification stations were placed at La Laurita area, located 25 kilometers from the city; there all the processes of extraction, purification and distribution were performed.
- Until 22 February 29 trucks were involved in the water distribution.

== See also ==
- Water supply and sanitation in Mendoza
- Water resources management in Argentina
- Integrated urban water management in Buenos Aires, Argentina
- Water privatization in Argentina
- Water supply and sanitation in Argentina
