= Musashino =

Musashino may refer to:

== Geography ==
- Musashino (train), a train service in Japan
- Musashino, Tokyo, a city in Greater Tokyo, Japan
- Musashino Line, a railway line in Greater Tokyo, Japan
- Musashino Plateau, a tableland in the Kantō region of Japan

== Space ==
- 3249 Musashino, an asteroid

== In the arts ==
- Musashino (Utamaro), an ukiyo-e print set by Kitagawa Utamaro, c. 1798–99
- "Musashino", a short story by Doppo Kunikida
- Musashino! (AKA Musasi-no), the second season of the anime TV series Urawa no Usagi-chan
- Musashino Animation, a fictional Japanese animation studio and the setting of the anime TV series Shirobako
