= Tsuneyuki =

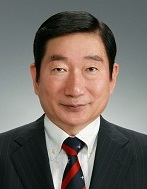
- Tsuneyuki Yamamoto. Japanese trade bureaucrat. Former Supreme Court Judge.
- Pronunciation: tsɯnejɯkʲi (IPA)
- Gender: Male

Origin
- Origin: Japanese
- Meaning: Different meanings depending on the kanji used

Other names
- Alternative spelling: Tuneyuki (Kunrei-shiki) Tuneyuki (Nihon-shiki) Tsuneyuki (Hepburn)

Tsuneyuki is a masculine Japanese given name.

== Written forms ==
Tsuneyuki can be written using different combinations of kanji characters. Here are some examples:

- 常行, "usual, go"
- 常之, "usual, of"
- 常幸, "usual, happiness"
- 常恭, "usual, respectful"
- 恒行, "always, go"
- 恒之, "always, of"
- 恒幸, "always, happiness"
- 恒雪, "always, snow"
- 庸行, "common, go"
- 庸之, "common, of"
- 庸幸, "common, happiness"
- 毎行, "every, go"
- 毎之, "every, of"
- 毎幸, "every, happiness"

The name can also be written in hiragana つねゆき or katakana ツネユキ.

== Notable people with the name ==
- Tsuneyuki Kawamata (川又 常行), 18th-century Japanese artist.
- Tsuneyuki Nakajima (中嶋 常幸; born 1954), Japanese golfer.
- Tsuneyuki Ueda (上田 常幸; born 1985), Japanese footballer.
