= Kawamata =

Kawamata (written: 川又 or 川俣) is a Japanese surname. Notable people with the surname include:

- Chiaki Kawamata (川又 千秋, born 1948), Japanese writer
- Kengo Kawamata (川又 堅碁, born 1989), Japanese footballer
- Naoki Kawamata (川俣 直樹, born 1985), Japanese rugby union player
- Saki Kawamata (川又 咲紀, born 1996), Japanese shogi player
- Tadashi Kawamata (川俣 正, born 1953), Japanese artist
- Kawamata Tsunemasa (川又 常正), Japanese ukiyo-e artist
- Kawamata Tsuneyuki (川又 常行, born c. 1677), Japanese ukiyo-e artist
- Yujiro Kawamata (川又 雄二郎, born 1952), Japanese mathematician

== See also ==
- Kawamata, Fukushima (川俣町, Kawamata-machi), town in Date District, Fukushima Prefecture, Japan
- Kawamata Station (川俣駅, Kawamata-eki), train station in Meiwa, Gunma Prefecture, Japan
