= Cosquín en Japón =

South American folk festival in Japan

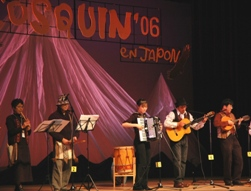
Cosquín en Japón 2006

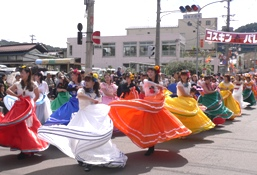
Opening-day parade for 2005

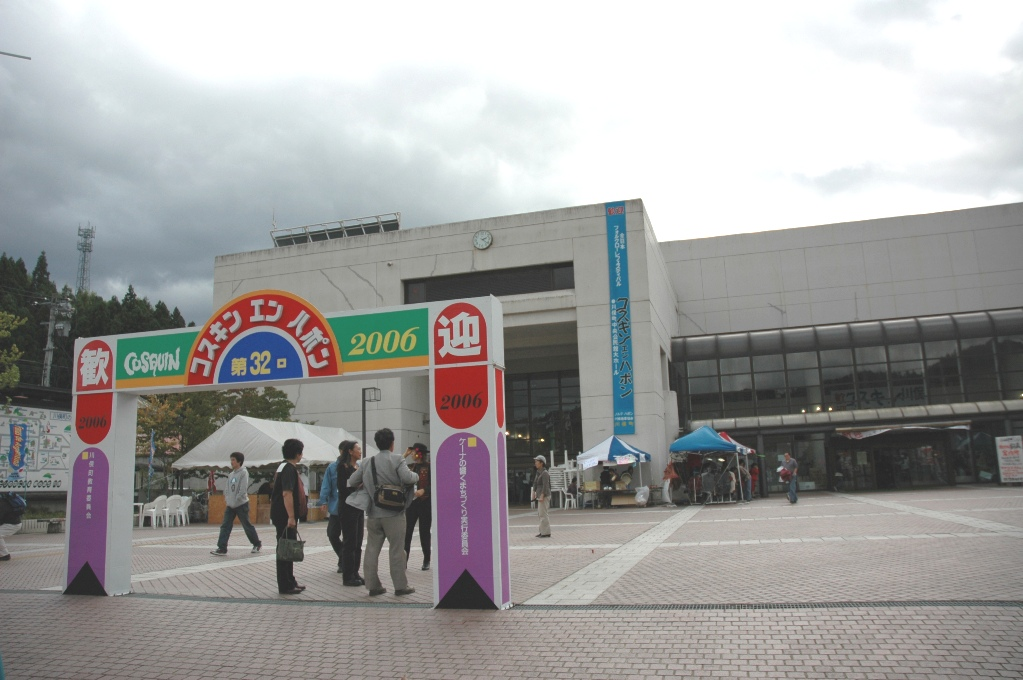
Event area at Kawamata Central Public Hall

Cosquín en Japón (コスキン・エン・ハポン, Kosukin en Hapon) is a three-day South American folk festival held annually in Kawamata, Fukushima, Japan. The name "Cosquín en Japón" is derived from the Cosquín Festival held in Cosquín, Argentina.

In 1955, Yasumitsu Naganuma (長沼 康光), a resident of Kawamata and Argentinian folk enthusiast, formed Norte Japón, otherwise known as the Northern Japan South American Music Alliance (北日本中南米音楽連盟). In 1975, the Alliance held the first Cosquín en Japón event at the Kawamata Welfare Center (川俣町福祉センター), with 13 amateur groups performing.

In 1981, the festival was moved to the Kawamata Central Public Hall, due to an increase in the number of performing groups, and in 2002 was expanded to become a three-day festival. Top performers and professionals from Japan and overseas now attend the festival, which is currently the largest Andean music festival in the country. In 2006, 161 groups performed, making it the largest Cosquín yet.

== International exchange ==
Increased awareness of Cosquín en Japón has deepened international ties with Argentina and the city of Cosquín. During the Japanese hosting of the 2002 FIFA World Cup, residents of Kawamata, at the urging of Argentina, formed a Japanese-style cheer club to cheer on the Argentinian team.

The Argentinian ambassador to Japan and the mayor of Cosquín have paid visits to Kawamata. Residents of Kawamata, including the mayor, have also visited Cosquín. Since 1999, Cosquín en Japón has held an annual contest to send representatives of Japan to the original Cosquín Festival in Argentina.

== Awards ==
- 1993: Suntory Regional Culture Award (サントリー地域文化賞)
- 2001: Yasumitsu Naganuma designated an Outstanding Contributor to Regional Culture (地域文化功労者) by the Agency for Cultural Affairs
- 2002: The Minister for Internal Affairs and Communications Regional Development Award (地域づくり総務大臣表彰) awarded to Kawamata
