= Water supply and sanitation in Argentina =

Data
- Water coverage (broad definition): 97% (2010)
- Sanitation coverage (broad definition): 90%
- Continuity of supply: Mostly continuous
- Average urban water and sanitation tariff (US$/m^{3}): 0.48 (water) and 0.31 (sewerage) in 2000
- Share of household metering: Low

Institutions
- Decentralization to municipalities: Substantial, since 1980
- Water and sanitation regulator: At provincial level
- Responsibility for policy setting: Ministry of Public Works
- No. of urban service providers: 1,650

Drinking water supply and sanitation in Argentina is characterized by relatively low tariffs, mostly reasonable service quality, low levels of metering and high levels of consumption for those with access to services. At the same time, according to the WHO, 21% of the total population remains without access to house connections and 52% of the urban population do not have access to sewerage. The responsibility for operating and maintaining water and sanitation services rests with 19 provincial water and sewer companies, more than 100 municipalities and more than 950 cooperatives, the latter operating primarily in small towns. Among the largest water and sewer companies are Agua y Saneamientos Argentinos (AYSA) and Aguas Bonarenses S.A. (ABSA), both operating in Greater Buenos Aires, Aguas Provinciales de Santa Fe, and Aguas Cordobesas SA, all of them now publicly owned. In 2008 there were still a few private concessions, such as Aguas de Salta SA, which is majority-owned by Argentine investors, and Obras Sanitarias de Mendoza (OSM).

Most service providers barely recover operation and maintenance costs and have no capacity to self-finance investments. While private operators were able to achieve higher levels of cost recovery, since the Argentine financial crisis in 2002 tariffs have been frozen and the self-financing capacity of utilities has disappeared. Roughly two-thirds of provincial water and sanitation spending since 2002 has come from general transfers from the federal government, the remainder coming from various national programs directed specifically to the sector.

Services are regulated by the 23 Provinces, in the case of 14 through regulatory agencies that have some limited autonomy from the government. Overall, however, responsibilities are not always clearly defined, and institutions are often weak, subject to political interference and lacking enforcement powers. The various national institutions with policy-setting responsibilities in the sector are not always well coordinated. There is no coherent national policy in terms of sector financing, subsidies, tariffs and service standards. The federal structure of the country and the dispersion of sector responsibilities between and within various levels of government make the development of a coherent sector policy all the more difficult.

Between 1991 and 1999, as part of one of the world's largest privatization programs covering a range of sectors, water and sanitation concessions with the private sector were signed covering 28% of the country's municipalities and 60% of the population. The highest profile concession was signed in 1993 with a consortium led by the French firm Suez for the central parts of Greater Buenos Aires. After the 2001 economic crisis, many concessions were renegotiated. Many were terminated, as it was the case in Buenos Aires in 2006.

The impact of private sector participation in water and sanitation is a controversial topic. While the public perception of the mostly international concessionaires is overwhelmingly negative in Argentina, some studies show positive impacts. For example, a 2002 study assessed the impact of privatization on child mortality based on household survey data, finding that child mortality fell 5 to 7 percent more in areas that privatized compared to those that remained under public or cooperative management. The authors estimate that the main reason is the massive expansion of access to water. According to Suez, the private concession in Buenos Aires extended access to water to 2 million people and access to sanitation to 1 million people, despite a freeze in tariffs imposed by the government in 2001 in violation of the concession agreement. The government argues that the concessionaire did not fully comply with its obligations concerning expansion and quality, saying that the supplied water had high levels of nitrate, pressure obligations were not kept and scheduled works were not carried out.

== Access ==
In Argentina, in 2015, 99% of the population had access to "special" water, 98.9% in urban areas and 99.9% in rural areas. Still, in 2015, around 390 thousand lacked access to "improved" water. Regarding access to "improved" sanitation it includes 96% of the population, 96% and 98%, in urban and rural areas, respectively. Approximately, 1.5 million of people were still without access to "improved" sanitation, in 2015.

		Urban (92% of the population)	Rural (8% of the population)	Total
Water	Improved water source	98%	80%	97%
Water	Piped on premises	83%	45%	80%
Sanitation	Improved sanitation	91%	77%	90%
Sanitation	Sewerage (2006 JMP survey & census data)	48%	5%	44%

Source: Joint Monitoring Programme for Water Supply and Sanitation of WHO/UNICEF.

According to a study by the Centro de Implementación de Políticas Públicas para la Equidad y el Crecimiento (CIPPEC) or Center for Implementation of Public Policies for Equity and Growth, the increase of coverage between 1991 and 2001 was lower in the poorest provinces.

== Service quality ==
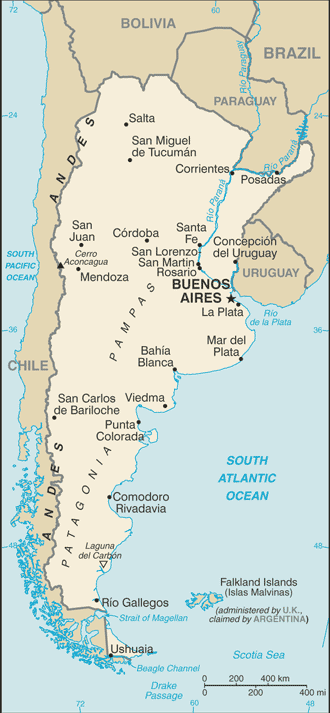
Map of Argentina. Source: CIA

In urban areas of Argentina, service is generally continuous and of potable quality. However, water rationing occurs in some cities during the summer months, and drinking water quality is sometimes sub-standard.

In Buenos Aires, in 2008 there were two water treatment plants and a new one was about to begin.

Concerning sanitation, existing sewage collection systems are insufficient to handle the increasing flows as a growing number of households connect to the sewer systems, leading to frequent sewer overflows.

The level of wastewater treatment varies among the Argentinean regions. According to the Pan American Health Organization, at the national level 10% of the collected wastewater was being treated in 2000. Whereas in many regional capitals, such as Mendoza, Córdoba, Tucumán, Neuquén, Jujuy, Salta and San Juan, most of the wastewater was treated, in the two largest urban areas of the country, Buenos Aires and Rosario, there was practically no treatment at all, resulting in serious environmental problems. However, in 2008 a bidding process was launched to build a wastewater treatment plant in Buenos Aires.

== Health Impacts ==
The most frequent water-related diseases in Argentina are acute gastrointestinal diseases, paratyphoid, typhoid fever and intestinal parasitosis. Diarrhea is one of the most pressing health problems. . Hepatitis ("A" and those not specified) has a strong incidence, with 30,661 notifications being registered nationwide in 1997, evidencing marked increases in coincidence with areas of low socioeconomic development.

== History and recent developments ==
From 1880 until 1980, the national utility Obras Sanitarias de la Nación (OSN) was in charge of providing water and sewer services in the main cities, while in smaller cities it was the responsibility of provincial governments, municipalities and cooperatives.

In 1980 the military government under Jorge Rafael Videla decentralized the provision of water and sanitation services in the main cities served by OSN, except for the metropolitan area of Buenos Aires where OSN continued to provide services. In other cities OSN transferred its responsibilities to provincial governments. Each province chose its model of service provision (municipal, public enterprises, cooperatives or others).

Between 1991 and 1999 under the government of Carlos Menem, as part of one of the world's largest privatization programs covering a range of sectors, water and sanitation concessions with the private sector were signed in 28% of the country's municipalities covering 60% of the population. The highest profile concession was signed in 1993 with a consortium led by the French firm Suez for the metropolitan area of Buenos Aires. After the 2001 economic crisis, under the government of Néstor Kirchner, many concessions were renegotiated. Some were even terminated and the responsibility for service provision reverted to public entities, as it was the case in Buenos Aires where the newly created public enterprise Aguas y Saneamientos Argentinos took over the responsibility for service provision in 2006. At the beginning of 2008, the government of the Province of Mendoza announced that it is interested in increasing its control of the provincial water utility "Obras Sanitarias de Mendoza", of which it owns 20%, buying another 20% from Saur International.

=== Impact of private sector participation ===
So far there has been no comprehensive, objective assessment of the impact of private sector participation in water supply and sanitation in Argentina. However, there has been some partial evidence. For example, a 2002 study assessed the impact of privatization on child mortality based on household survey data, finding that in the 1991-1997 period child mortality fell 5 to 7 percent more in areas that privatized compared to those that remained under public or cooperative management. It also found that the effect was largest in poorest areas (24%). The authors estimate that the main reason is the massive expansion of access to water, which was concentrated in poorer areas that did not receive services before private sector participation was introduced.

==== The Buenos Aires concession ====
The largest and best-known case of private sector participation in the Argentine water and sanitation sector was the Buenos Aires concession, signed in 1993 and revoked in 2006. Its impact remains controversial and in early 2008 an arbitration case was still pending with the International Center for Settlement of Investment Disputes (ICSID) of the World Bank Group.

Critics argue that the concessionaire failed to achieve the targets set under the concession contract. When the government rescinded the concession in March 2006, it argued that Aguas Argentinas did not comply with obligations concerning expansion and quality. According to the government, the supplied water had high levels of nitrate, pressure obligations were not kept and scheduled waterworks were not executed by the concessionaire. On the other hand, proponents of private participation state that a freeze in tariffs at the time of the devaluation of the Peso during the Argentinean economic crisis in 2001 substantially reduced the real value of tariff revenues and thus made it difficult to achieve the original targets.

One factor which may have caused the cancellation of the concession contract was the precipitate preparation. Alcazar et al. list some features of the concession which indicate an overhasty process:

1. The regulatory agency ETOSS (Ente Tripartito de Obras de Servicios de Saneamiento, Tripartite Entity for Sanitary Services) lacked experience, since it was founded quickly as part of the concession process.
2. The available information in the concession contract about the state of the existing infrastructure was so poor, that the Argentinean government denied taking responsibility for it. This lack of information could have let the bidder to accept the contract in the expectation of future renegotiation.
3. Instead of creating a new and more transparent tariff system, the old one was adopted from OSN.

In addition, the inexperienced regulatory agency was repeatedly bypassed when decisions were taken, for example in the renegotiation of the contract in 1997. In that way, ETOSS was further weakened. The concession contract authorized Aguas Argentinas to demand dollars at the old 1:1 exchange rate after the peso devaluation. Solanes points out that without this practice companies may seek financing in local capital markets to avoid currency fluctuations. He also argues that the needs of the poor were not addressed in the concession. No subsidies were provided for the poor and the tariff system did not encourage expansion of coverage to poor areas, since new connections were often unaffordable and new users also had to pay the costs of expanding the network.

The concessionaire did invest much more than its public predecessor and achieved substantial increases in access to water and sewerage. According to the Argentinean economist Sebastian Galiani, the public company OSN had invested only US$25m per year between 1983 and 1993, while the private concessionaire Aguas Argentinas increased investments to around US$200 m per year between 1993 and 2000.

According to Suez, during the 13 year-duration of its concession it extended access to water to 2 million people and access to sanitation to 1 million people, despite the economic crisis. Between 2003 and 2005 alone about 100,000 inhabitants of poor neighborhoods and slums are said to have been connected through a "participatory management model" piloted by Aguas Argentinas. Aspects of the model have been adopted by the government to extend services to another 400,000 people in La Matanza in the province of Buenos Aires in the project "Water plus work" ("Aguas más trabajo").

==== An example of local private sector participation: Salta ====
The government of Salta Province initiated the reform of its water sector in 1996. At the same time many other Argentinean provinces and municipalities brought in the private sector to improve water and sanitation services. While Salta also followed this approach, the process differed somewhat from the one in many other parts of Argentina. First, the provincial government conducted a series of meetings with municipalities and user organizations to discuss the benefits and risks of the concession before it was bid out. This process of consultations was continued by the private concessionaire after the contract was awarded. Second, the government decided from the onset that water and sanitation services in the poor province could not be financed entirely through tariff revenues. It thus decided to finance much of the investments to be undertaken by the private concessionaire with public grants, in addition to providing consumption subsidies. Third, the regulatory agency allowed the concessionaire to provide services at a lower standard in remote or isolated areas that were deemed unprofitable at conventional service standards. Fourth, the provincial regulatory agency granted tariff increases before and even after the 2001 economic crisis. These tariff increases were lower than it would have been necessary without subsidies or flexible service standards. And fifth, the government "ignored the traditional paradigm of only permitting companies with significant previous experience in water supply and sanitation to compete in the bidding process". This provision had favored a few large multinational water firms in other bidding processes. In Salta, however, the bid was won by the Argentinean construction, power and toll road enterprise MECON S.A. which signed a technical assistance contract with the Brazilian Paraná State public utility SANEPAR.

The private concession led to a substantial increase in access to water and sanitation from the time of concession award in 1999 to 2005. It also provided a significant decrease in service interruptions and improved customer service. 13 more municipalities joined the concession contract after it had been signed in order to share in its benefits, bringing the total number of municipalities served by the concessionaire to 56.

While most other private water concessions in Argentina were rescinded in the years after the 2001 economic crisis, the Salta concession has been upheld until 2009 despite a number of problems. In February 2008 the regulatory agency initiated penal proceedings against the concessionaire because one of its wastewater treatment plants discharging to the Arenales River was not functioning. In June 2008 the company was accused of not having complied with contractual targets for the installation of meters, water pressure, continuity of supply, drinking water quality norms, and of applying excessive interests on late payments. In May 2009 Juan Manuel Urtubey, governor of the Province, terminated the concession contract because of non-compliance and created a transition unit to provide services until a state company would be created whose shares would be held by the Province (90%) and workers (10%).

== Responsibility for water supply and sanitation ==
=== Policy and regulation ===
Provinces have responsibility for setting rules and policies in the sector for their area. Institutions are weak, subject to political interference and lacking in enforcement powers. 14 out of 23 provinces have regulatory bodies, but they often have limited capacity and unclear institutional responsibilities. In most cases, they act as supervisors of private concession contracts, not covering public and cooperative service providers. This autonomy of provinces resulted in a highly heterogeneous system of water supply and sanitation. Moreover, it hinders to create an overview of the situation at the national level.

Despite recent progress in clarifying responsibilities, the institutional framework at the national level still lacks coherence and coordination among federal actors is weak. The Ministry of Public Works proposes sector policies to the Ministry of Federal Planning, Public Investment and Services which approves them. Within this policy framework the National Agency for Water and Sanitation Works (ENOHSA), a decentralized agency under the Ministry of Public Works, provides financing and technical assistance to service providers. As an advisor to the Ministry of Public Works it de facto influences sector policies. ENOHSA has also been given the faculty to directly execute infrastructure works. There has been some confusion between its position as conceding power (in the Buenos Aires concession) and as policy-maker for the overall sector. There is no coherent national policy in terms of sector financing, subsidies, tariffs and service standards. Nor is there a sector law for water and sanitation. The federal structure of the country and the dispersion of sector responsibilities between and within various levels of government make the development of a coherent sector policy all the more difficult.

=== Service provision ===
Provision of water and sanitation supply in Argentina is organized on a municipal or provincial basis by around 1,650 public, cooperative and private entities of various forms. 14 service providers are provincial (Argentina has 23 provinces), but do not necessarily serve the entire province. Some are multi-municipal, some serve a single municipality and others parts of a municipality. There are at least 990 mostly smaller cooperative service providers in Argentina, making Argentina the country in Latin America where this form of service provision is most prevalent.

== Financial aspects ==
=== Tariffs ===
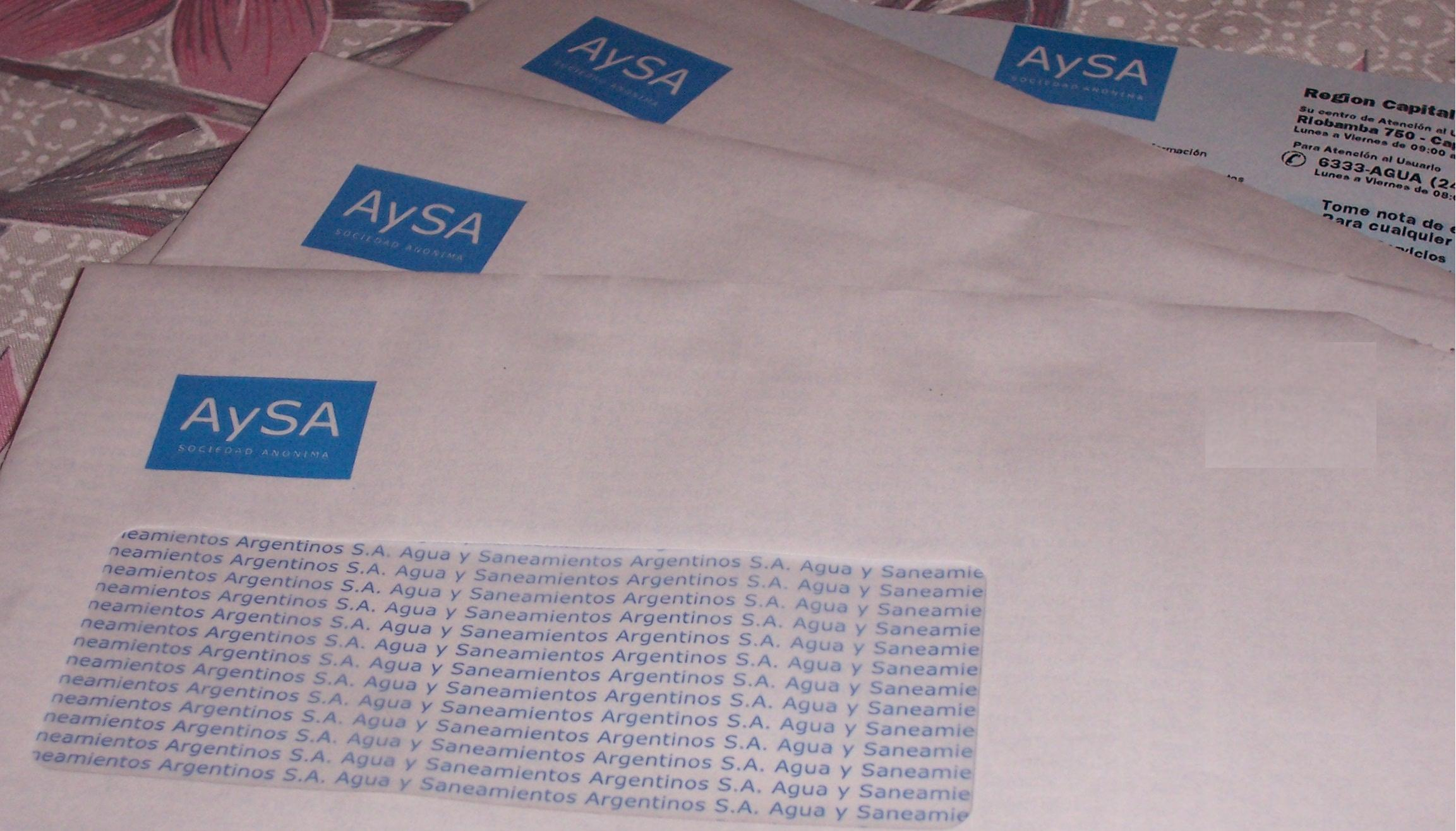
Bills of Aguas y Saneamientos Argentinos

In 2000, the Argentinean water and sanitation tariff levels were high, given the low quality of services. According to the Panamerican Health Organization (PAHO), the mean tariff for water and sanitation was US$0.79 per m3. There are two different tariff systems. The first method is based on the former OSN tariff system. It estimates the consumption of each user according to characteristics such as dwelling size, location of residence and type of dwelling. The second tariff system contains a fixed charge and a variable part which is based on metered consumption. This latter method was made possible by the extensive introduction of water metering, which was included in many concession contracts in the 1990s. The average household expenditure for water supply and sanitation in 2002 was 2.6%, ranging from 2.1% in the highest (wealthiest) quintile to 3.5% in the lowest (poorest) one.

=== Cost recovery ===
Most service providers barely recover operation and maintenance costs and have no capacity to self-finance investments. While private operators were able to achieve higher levels of cost recovery and to substantially expand services before the crisis, since 2002 their tariffs have been frozen and their self-financing capacity has disappeared. Service providers thus are almost entirely dependent on federal transfers for investment financing. Roughly two-thirds of provincial water and sanitation spending over the period has come from general transfers from the federal government, the remainder coming from various programs directed specifically to the sector, including for flood protection and water resources management.

When the linkage of the Argentinean peso to the US-Dollar was abandoned due to a serious economic crisis in 2002, the tariffs did not increase but converted 1 to 1 to the devalued peso, resulting in various contract renegotiations. This decision worsened the financial situation of the suppliers. The lack of financial resources results in problems concerning even in maintaining the supply system.

Cutting off water services for non-payment is prohibited in Argentina based on a common interpretation of the constitution.

== External support ==
=== Inter-American Development Bank ===
- AR-L1015 : Water Infrastructure: Northern Provinces Development: Approved on January 31, 2007 in the amount of US$240 million, the loan will address specific problems of irrigation, drainage, as well as low access to water and sanitation in the northern provinces of Jujuy, Catamarca, Santiago del Estero, Tucumán, and Chaco.
- AR-L1034 : PEF:AR-L1031 Potable Water and Sanitation Program: Approved on September 25, 2006 in the amount of US$180 million the program will partly finance water and/or sewerage systems for communities up to 50,000 in Argentina.

=== World Bank ===
- Infrastructure Project for the Province of Buenos Aires (APL2): The US$270 million loan was approved on June 28, 2007 and finances 40% sewerage and 16% flood protection for the highly vulnerable and low-income communities in the Province of Buenos Aires.
- Basic Municipal Services Project: The US$175 million loan approved on April 3, 2006 finances water (27%), sanitation (27%), and sewerage (14%) projects in Argentina.
- Urban Flood Prevention and Drainage APL1: The US$190 million loan approved on May 18, 2006 finances flood protection (94%) as well as general water and sanitation sector (2%) in the city of Buenos Aires through the protection of the city's critical infrastructure and the introduction of risk management into the government investment program.
- Infrastructure Project for the Province of Buenos Aires (APL1): The US$267 million loan approved on February 15, 2006 finances infrastructure services in sewerage (30%) and flood protection (5%) in the Province of Buenos Aires.

=== European Investment Bank ===
The European Investment Bank loaned Agua y Saneamientos Argentinos S.A. (AySA) $80 million to help modernize water and wastewater infrastructure in Buenos Aires through a project meant to expand a sewage network, a wastewater treatment facility, and a water treatment plant. The initiative will minimize the risk of waterborne infections and promote public health by boosting access to sanitation, particularly for low-income and vulnerable individuals in the region. It will assist to keep microplastics out of the Atlantic Ocean by reducing plastic pollution in the Reconquista River.

The financing will be used to expand the wastewater treatment plant Las Catonas, which will serve 350 000 people. A new sewage network will also be built across the city, serving about 24 000 persons. The new infrastructure will help safeguard the environment and reduce greenhouse gas emissions by recycling biogas and decreasing the flow of untreated effluents into surface waterways. The Inter-American Development Bank is helping to fund this project.

=== French Development Agency ===
In 2018, the French Development Agency (AFD) provided a US$70 million loan to Argentina's Belgrano Plan, a program intended to expand drinking water and sanitation services in ten northern provinces. The financing complemented a US$200 million loan from the Inter-American Development Bank. The program included investment in water supply and sewerage infrastructure, wastewater treatment, and improvements to the management of water and sanitation service providers.

=== Abu Dhabi Fund for Development ===
In 2019, the Abu Dhabi Fund for Development (ADFD), a development finance institution of the United Arab Emirates, provided an US$80 million loan to finance the second stage of the Desvío Arijón aqueduct in Santa Fe Province. The project involved expanding drinking water treatment capacity and extending water supply infrastructure to municipalities in the province.

=== CAF-Development Bank of Latin America and the Caribbean ===
In June 2025, CAF-Development Bank of Latin America and the Caribbean approved a US$150 million loan for the Sustainable Aqueduct System Program in Chubut Province. The project will improve the aqueduct system supplying Comodoro Rivadavia, Rada Tilly, Sarmiento and Caleta Olivia, benefiting more than 286,000 people.

== See also ==
- Water supply and sanitation in Mendoza
- Water resources management in Argentina
- Water supply problems in Caleta Olivia 2014
- Obras Sanitarias de la Nación
- Agua y Saneamientos Argentinos (AySA)
