= Musashino (Utamaro) =

Color triptych print by Kitagawa Utamaro

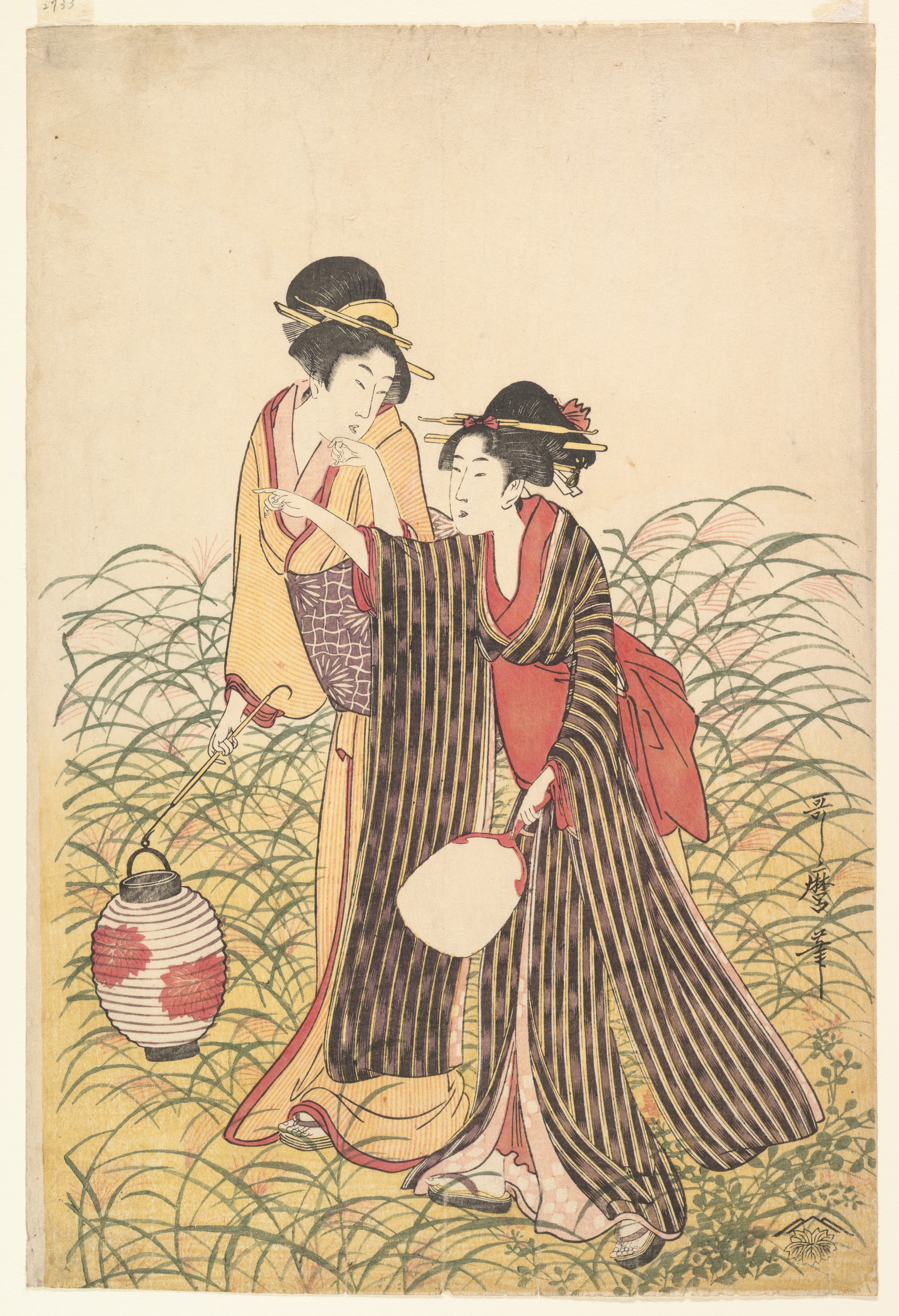
Rightmost panel of Musashino, Utamaro, multicolour woodblock print, c. 1798–99

Musashino (武蔵野, c. 1798–99) is a triptych print by the Japanese ukiyo-e artist Kitagawa Utamaro (c. 1753 – 1806). It is a mitate-e parody picture that alludes to the story in the 12th section of The Tales of Ise.

== Background ==
Ukiyo-e art flourished in Japan during the Edo period from the 17th to 19th centuries, and took as its primary subjects courtesans, kabuki actors, and others associated with the "floating world" lifestyle of the pleasure districts. Alongside paintings, mass-produced woodblock prints were a major form of the genre. In the mid-18th century full-colour nishiki-e prints became common, printed using a large number of woodblocks, one for each colour. A prominent genre was bijin-ga ("pictures of beauties"), which depicted most often courtesans and geisha at leisure, and promoted the entertainments of the pleasure districts.

Kitagawa Utamaro (c. 1753–1806) made his name in the 1790s with his bijin ōkubi-e ("large-headed pictures of beautiful women") portraits, focusing on the head and upper torso, a style others had previously employed in portraits of kabuki actors. Utamaro experimented with line, colour, and printing techniques to bring out subtle differences in the features, expressions, and backdrops of subjects from a wide variety of class and background. Utamaro's individuated beauties were in sharp contrast to the stereotyped, idealized images that had been the norm.

== Description and analysis ==
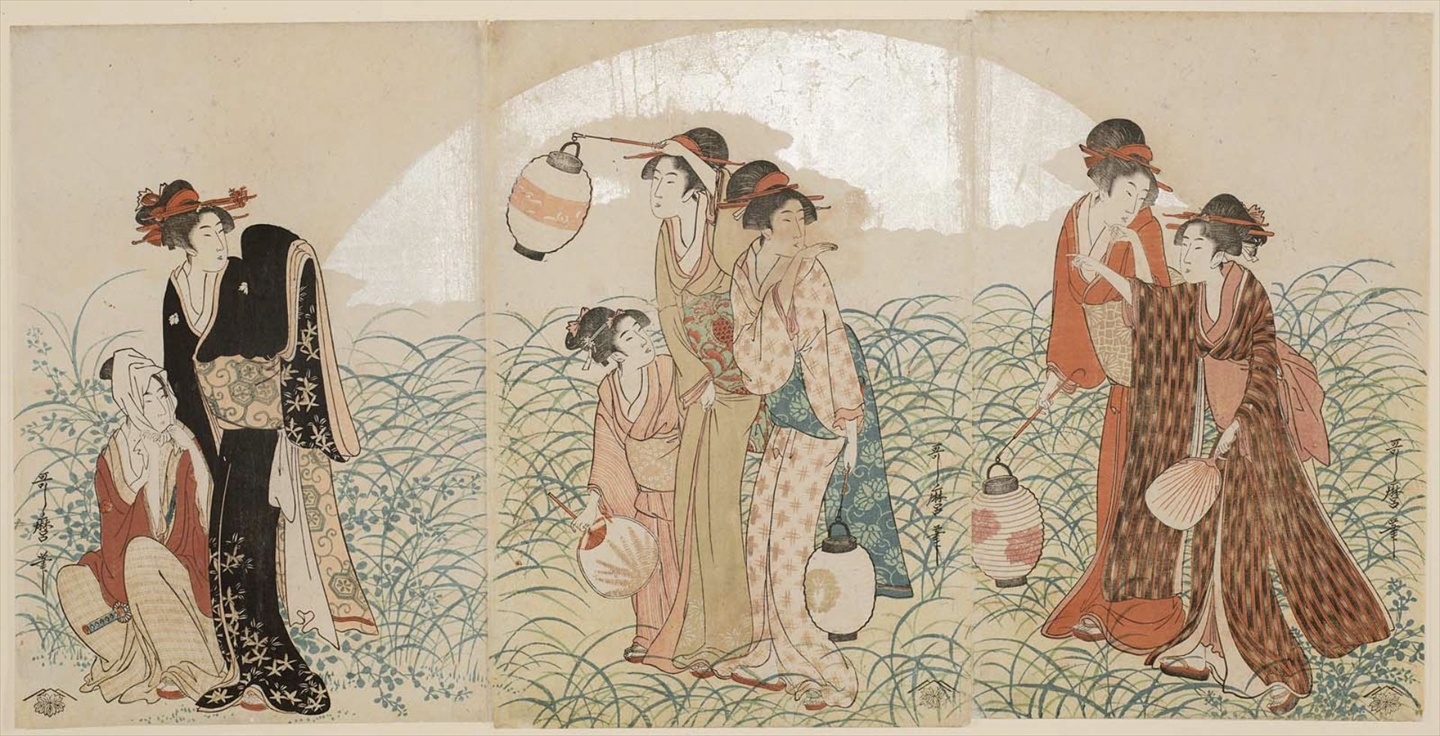

The three sheets are multicolour nishiki-e prints in ōban size, about 37 by 24 centimetres (15 in × 9 in) each. The set forms a triptych and was published in c. 1794–95 by Tsutaya Jūzaburō.

The picture is a mitate-e parody alluding to a scene from the 12th section of The Tales of Ise, a Heian-period collection of poems and associated narratives. In the story, a man kidnaps a woman and hides her in Musashino Plain, where their pursuers discover them just as they are about to set fire to the grasses with their torches. Though she had been kidnapped, many paintings of the scene depict the woman sheltering the man with the large sleeve of her kimono.

In Utamaro's picture, the search party has become fashionably-dressed, pleasure-seeking women who carry chōchin paper lamps rather than torches. To the left, a young samurai crouches and covers his head in a cloth while a young woman dressed like a geisha blocks the view of him. The scene is set in field of thickly-growing pampas grass, behind which rises an exaggeratedly large Moon. The Moon is dusted with muscovite to give it a glittering effect.
