= Caleta Olivia =

- City and Port
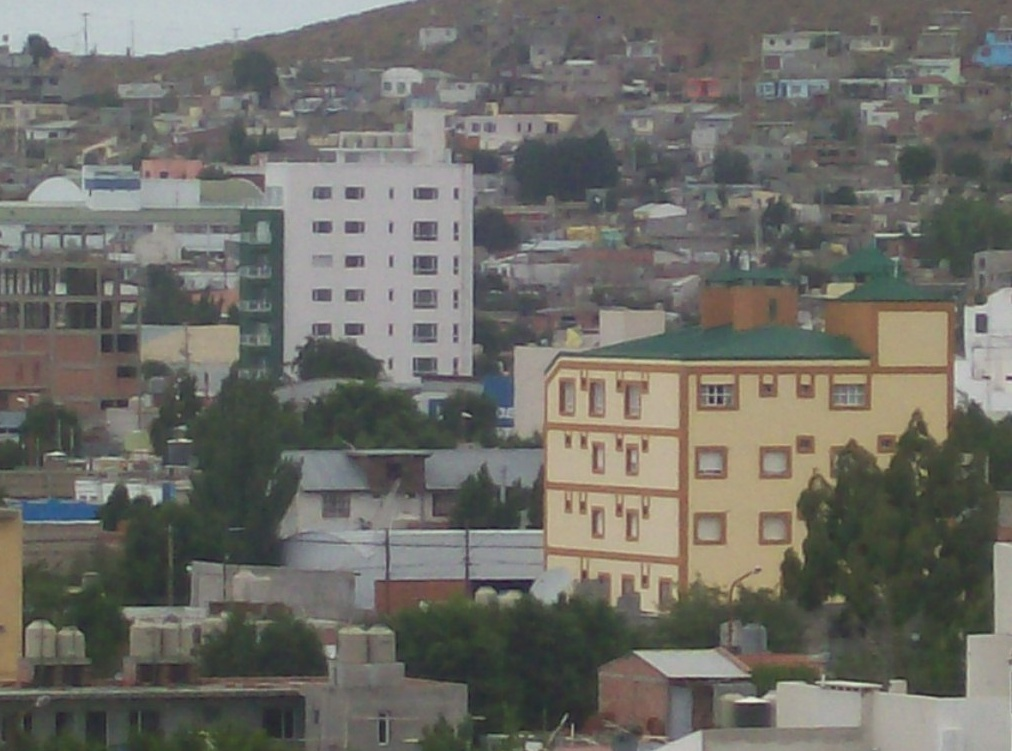

- Location of Caleta Olivia in Argentina Caleta Olivia (Argentina)
- Coordinates: 46°26′S 67°32′W
- Country: Argentina
- Province: Santa Cruz
- Department: Deseado
- Founded: 20 November 1901
- Founded by: Exequiel Guttero

Government
  - Intendant: Pablo Carrizo (SER Santa Cruz)

Area
  - Total: 35.03 km^{2} (13.53 sq mi)
- Elevation: 13 m (43 ft)

Population (2022 census)
  - Total: 56,310
  - Density: 1,607/km^{2} (4,163/sq mi)
- Time zone: UTC−3 (ART)
- CPA base: Z9011
- Dialing code: +54 297
- Climate: BSk
- Website: Official website

Caleta Olivia is a coastal city located in the northeast of the Argentine province of Santa Cruz, on the San Jorge Gulf by the Atlantic Ocean. It had a population of 56,310 in the 2022 census [INDEC]. It is the second most important city of the province after Rio Gallegos, and the most populated in the Deseado Department.

The city was founded on 20 November 1901, by Navy Lieutenant Exequiel Guttero, captain of the Guardia Nacional, a ship that was transporting cables, equipment, and workers for the construction of a telegraph line south of Comodoro Rivadavia. The settlement was given the name of his wife Olivia (caleta means "small bay", "inlet").

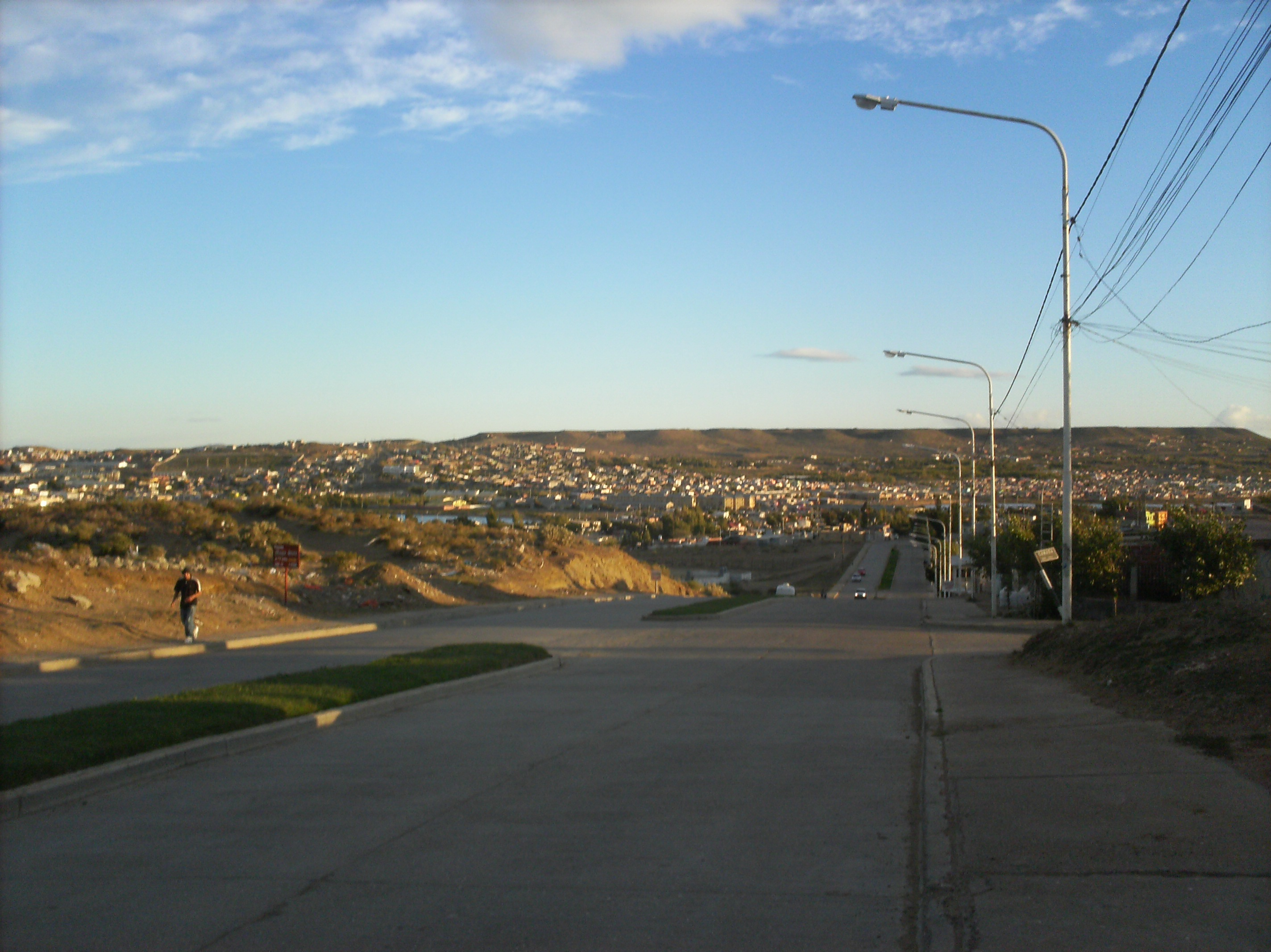

The main economic activities around the city are petroleum, sheep and fishing. Its port serves both as a fishing centre, and as an export point for locally produced goods.

Among the monuments of the city, probably the most characteristic is that of "El Gorosito," built to honour a petroleum industry worker.

== Climate ==
The city has a cold semi-arid climate (Köppen climate classification BSk) with warm summers and cold winters. Precipitation is sparse, averaging 200.7 mm (8 in) a year.

Despite the southern latitude, the city has moderate temperatures due to the regulation of the ocean, with beaches visited during sunny days in summer, where different water and sand sports are practiced.

Climate data for Caleta Olivia
Month	Jan	Feb	Mar	Apr	May	Jun	Jul	Aug	Sep	Oct	Nov	Dec	Year
Daily mean °C (°F)	18.3 (64.9)	17.8 (64.0)	15.6 (60.1)	12.4 (54.3)	8.6 (47.5)	5.7 (42.3)	5.5 (41.9)	7.0 (44.6)	9.3 (48.7)	12.1 (53.8)	15.2 (59.4)	17.1 (62.8)	12.1 (53.8)
Average precipitation mm (inches)	13.8 (0.54)	13.9 (0.55)	17.8 (0.70)	19.7 (0.78)	26.1 (1.03)	21.4 (0.84)	23.1 (0.91)	19.6 (0.77)	10.5 (0.41)	12.0 (0.47)	10.3 (0.41)	12.5 (0.49)	200.7 (7.90)
Average precipitation days	3.8	3.7	3.6	4.7	6.2	5.6	5.4	5.6	4.4	4.4	3.9	5.0	56.3
Average relative humidity (%)	41.8	44.0	48.0	52.3	61.2	64.2	63.3	58.5	52.5	47.3	42.7	41.0	51.4
Percentage possible sunshine	50.4	54.3	48.6	45.5	42.9	41.9	41.9	44.4	45.7	49.2	51.3	48.6	47.1
Source: Weatherbase

== See also ==
Water supply problems in Caleta Olivia 2014
