= Kawamata Tsuneyuki =

Japanese ukiyo-e artist (born c. 1677)

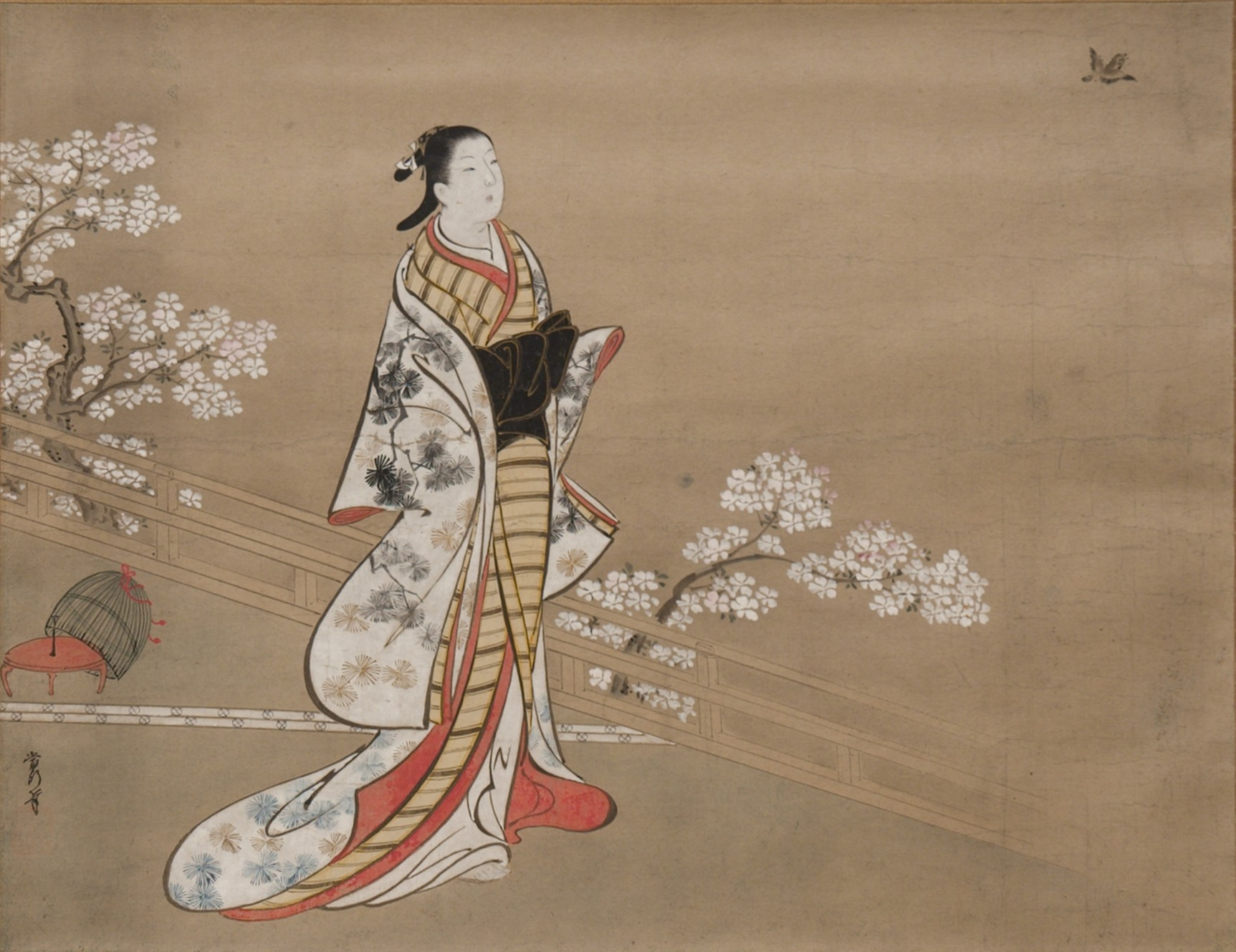
Mitate-e of the "Wakamurasaki" episode of The Tale of Genji, ink and colour on paper hanging scroll

Kawamata Tsuneyuki (川又 常行, b. c. 1677) was a Japanese ukiyo-e artist and founder of the Kawamata School of art. He was born in Niigata, and studied under Kanō Tsunenobu. Like many early Ukiyo-e artists, Tsuneyuki and his school specialized in painting (nikuhitsu-ga) rather than designing woodblock prints.

Tsuneyuki's active period was from the Kyōhō (1716–36) to the Kanpō (1741–44) eras. Something more than twenty paintings identified as his survive. They tend to be sharply outlined, florid paintings of elegant women, apparently influenced by the work of Miyagawa Chōshun.

The Inoue Kazuo (井上和雄) edition of the Ukiyo-e Ruikō dates a work of Inoue's to 1741 and states he was 65 at the time, from which a birth year of 1677 is assumed. Tsuneyuki's date of death is unknown. One of his students was Kawamata Tsunemasa. The Kawamata school, considered a minor one, only had a provisional lineage of its artists, Tsuneyuki, Tsunemasa and Tsunetatsu, proposed in 1943 by Fujikake Shizuya in his Ukiyo-e no Kenkyū, a lineage subsequently confirmed on the basis of the fashions depicted in their respective paintings.
