= Water supply and sanitation in Mendoza =

The debate about water supply and sanitation in Mendoza has been dominated by the controversial private concession for the provincial water company OSM granted in 1998 to a consortium led by Enron. While the concession improved water and sanitation services, it failed to meet all its specified targets. After the collapse of Enron the concession was overtaken by Argentine investors.

Besides OSM water services in the province are provided by the three municipalities of Maipú, Luján and Tupungatu and 174 small not-for-profit operators.

With 1.6 million inhabitants the province of Mendoza is the fifth most populous province of Argentina. The province has an arid climate and its water supply depends on rivers fed by glaciers from the Andes.

== History ==
=== Sector reform (1993-1998) ===
In 1993, in response to poor service quality, the provincial Parliament passed a law (Law 6044) with the objective of restructuring the province’s water and sanitation sector, introducing a private concession for the provincially owned company Obras Sanitarias de Mendoza (OSM) and creating a regulatory agency for the sector. In the same year the provincial government also first submitted a draft law to Parliament to pursue a policy of installing water meters and volumetric billing. More than 120,000 meters were installed in the following five years. However, that law was never passed. Meters were thus not read and fell into disrepair, while bills continued to be issued on a lump sum basis independently of consumption. Moreover, a culture of non-payment reigned. According to a survey by the newspaper Los Andes, in 1999 one quarter of water users did not pay their water bills.

=== Early years of the concession (1998-2001) ===
In 1998 the provincial government launched a bid for a concession for OSM, which was won by a US-French-Argentine consortium led by Enron. OSM’s capital was thus held by the following entities:

- 50% by the Enron-led consortium Inversores del Aconcagua
- 20% by an operating company called Aguas de Mendoza
- 20% were kept by the provincial government
- 10% by the company’s employees.

Inversora del Aconcagua initially consisted of the US firm Enron (57.5%), the French firm SAUR International (17.5%), Italgas (5%) and Argentine investors (20%). Aguas de Mendoza is fully owned by SAUR International.

The concession contract was signed for the unusually long duration of 99 years. Investment commitments were US$ 89million over 25 years.

Tariffs were supposed to remain stable for the first five years of the contract. However, there was a 37% increase after the renegotiation of the concession in 2003.

=== The concession after the economic crisis (2001 onwards) ===
After the economic crisis of 2001 and the devaluation of the peso, a number of problems became apparent:

- Tariffs were frozen in 2002 by a national emergency decree, in contradiction of tariff increases stipulated in the concession contract. As a result, revenues were insufficient to recover increasing costs;
- There were delays in the execution of works;
- There were problems of bacteriological pollution of drinking water;
- Low water pressure (40% of users do not receive water below minimum pressure);
- Insufficient attention to user complaints;
- Reduction of environmental targets.

In 2002 a process was initiated to renegotiate the concession contract. When Enron went bankrupt in 2003 its part of the shares was initially taken over by its own subsidiary Azurix. In 2004 the shares of OSM were worth only one fifth of their value in 1998. In the same year South Water Argentina SA of the Sielecki Group took over 32% of the shares of OSM from Enron after the latter went bankrupt.

According to Susana Yelich, director of the consumer group Prodelco, service provision in 2004 was much better than at the time when OSM had been publicly managed. Nevertheless, many consumers were dissatisfied with the services they received and more than 120 lawsuits were initiated against the private operator.

At the beginning of 2008, the provincial government announced that it is interested in increasing its control of OSM, of which it owns 20%, buying another 20% from Saur International.

== Responsibility for water supply and sanitation ==
=== Policy and regulation ===
Sector policy is the responsibility of the provincial governor, assisted by the provincial Minister of Public Works and the Environment.

Economic regulation is the responsibility of a regulatory agency, the Ente Provincial de Aguas y Saneamiento (EPAS), under the Ministry of Public Works and Environment. It was created in 1995 on the basis of Law 6044 of 1993. EPAS remained a weak agency and, as a technical agency with limited autonomy. It was unable to fulfill its role of regulating the concession contract which included both technical and political elements. The regulator has been highly critical of the private concession, requesting it in 2003 to be cancelled due to non-respect of the contractual agreements.

=== Service provision ===
There are three categories of service providers in the province of Mendoza:

- OSM with more than 320,000 water and sewer connections
- The three municipalities of Maipú, Luján and Tupungatu with more than 100,000 water and sewer connections
- 174 small operators, such as cooperatives and neighborhood associations, with more than 38,000 connections.

== Financial aspects ==
=== Tariffs ===
In 1998 tariffs of OSM were 30 pesos (US$30) every two months, much more than the national average of 18 pesos (US$18). The average tariff level in 2004 was 60 pesos (US$20) for water and sewerage for a period of two months, compared to only 15 pesos (US$5) in the case of Buenos Aires. Because of the massive devaluation of the Argentine peso the dollar value of tariffs decreased in this period, although the Peso value of tariffs had doubled in Mendoza.

Note: Tariff data for municipalities and cooperatives are missing.

=== Sector finances ===
It is a matter of controversy whether OSM made profits from its concession. In five years OSM paid only 1 million pesos of dividends. In 2002 and 2003 OSM showed losses of 43 and 17 million pesos respectively. However, according to the regulatory agency its rate of return was 13%.

Annual fees from the concession were intended to finance the construction of the Potrerillos levee on the Mendoza River, the largest hydraulic infrastructure ever built in the Province. The fees were supposed to be paid by the concessionaire to the Provincial Irrigation Department. However, due to the various problems that afflicted the concession that fee has never been paid. Until 2002 a debt of more than 4 million Pesos had been accumulated.

A list of 26,000 needy users (carenciados) was established in 2003, for whom the provincial government would pay 40-75% of the water bill. However, not all those on the list were truly needy, since the establishment of the list was influenced by clientelism. Despite requests by the concessionaire, the list has never been updated until 2004. Furthermore, the provincial government has only partially met its payment obligations towards OSM on behalf of the needy users, having accumulated a debt of 13 million Pesos towards OSM by 2000. On the other hand, OSM has not paid taxes, the concession fee and fines imposed on it by the regulator for not having met its investment obligations, equivalent to 13 million Pesos as well.

== Media and the water and sanitation sector ==
Among the province’s two main newspapers, Los Andes was highly critical of the concession and of privatization in general. The newspaper Uno was much less critical, which may be explained by the fact that its owner, Daniel Vila, was also a co-owner of OSM through Inversores del Aconcagua. In general the concession contract received negative media coverage, with the media giving ample space to the criticism voiced by politicians, consumer associations and the regulator.

== Sources ==
Akhmouch A. (2004) "La privatisation des services publics argentins au coeur d'enjeux géopolitiques, conflits et rivalités territoriales. Le cas de la concession d'eau et d'assainissement dans la province de Mendoza", Tesis de Posgrado, Universidad de Paris 8, p. 76-140

== See also ==
Water supply and sanitation in Argentina
