= Mitate-e =

Japanese woodblock prints

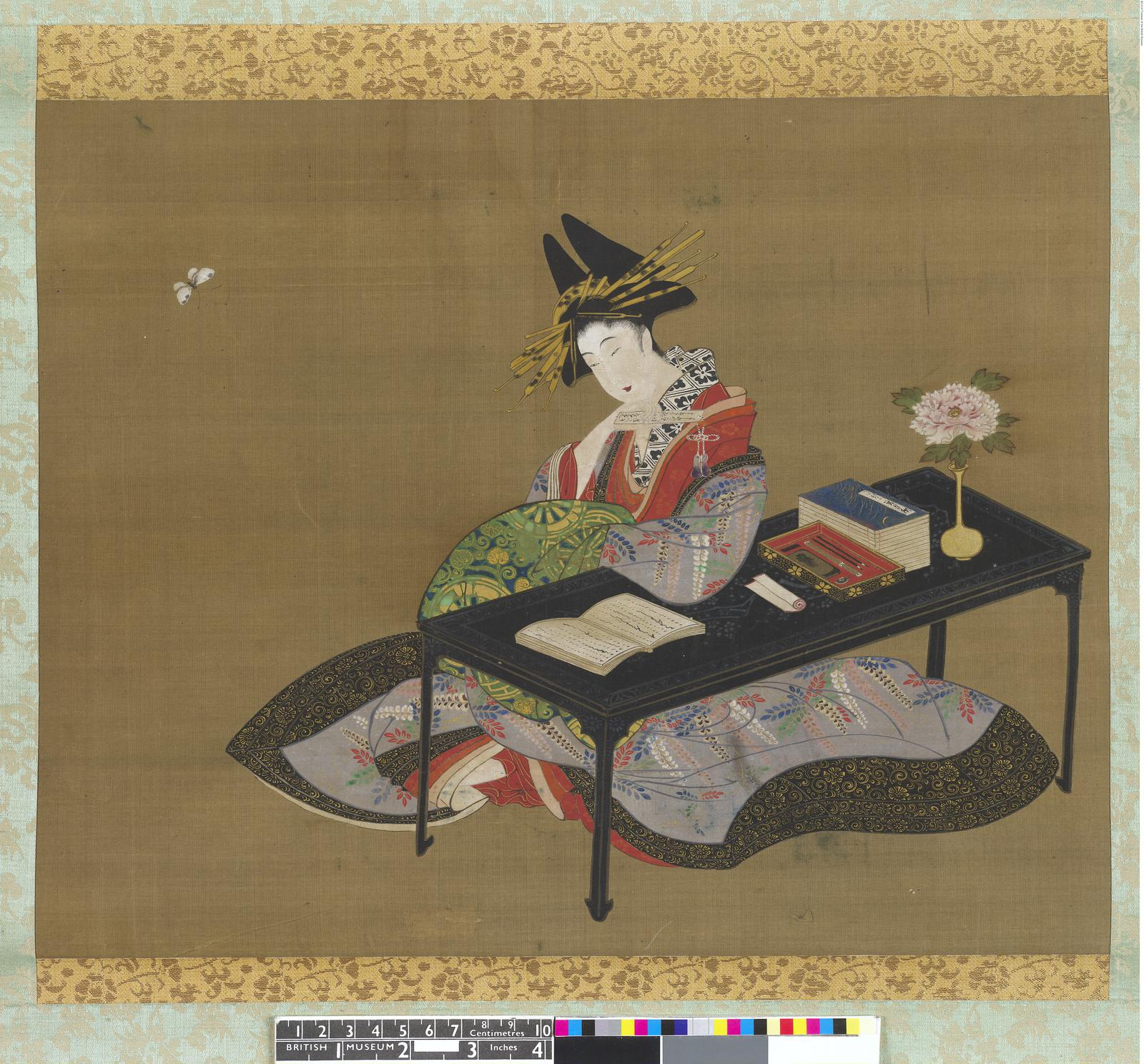
Painting, hanging scroll, mitate-e, 1425. Parody of Zhuang Zi's dream of butterflies: courtesan wearing surcoat decorated with hanging coloured wisteria blooms and green brocade belt with design of water-wheels and trailing leaves of aquatic candock plant, seated leaning on Chinese writing-table with vase of peony, and looking up at butterfly. Ink, colour and gold on silk. Collection, British Museum

In Japanese art, mitate-e (見立絵) is a subgenre of ukiyo-e that employs allusions, puns, and incongruities, often to parody classical art or events.

The term derives from two roots: mitateru (見立る, "to liken one thing to another") (Note: Mitateru has a number of other meanings not relevant to mitate-e.) and e (絵, "picture"). The mitate technique arose first in poetry and became prominent during the Heian period (794–1185). Haiku poets revived the technique during the Edo period (1603–1868), from which it spread to the other arts of the era. Such works typically employ allusions, puns, and incongruities, and frequently recall classical artworks.

In the context of ukiyo-e, mitate-e is often translated into English as "parody picture". This usage of the term arose much later; the term itself was used in different ways during the Edo period. Those works today called mitate-e used different labels at the time, such as fūryū (風流, "elegant" or "fashionable") which appeared frequently in the 18th century in works by Okumura Masanobu (1686–1764) and Suzuki Harunobu (1725–1770). In Edo-period, mitate-e are not only limited to just substitution or pictorial analogy, but usually emphasizing playful or humorous interpretation.

== History and origins ==
The origin of the word Mitate is very early. It appears in Kojiki as the heavenly pillar. This does not mean that the pillar really existed, but to mitate a virtual pillar in to the heavenly pillar. Later in the Japanese ritual practice, they mitate existed mortal pillar into this heavenly pillar. The key is to transfer one thing into another and make connections between their meanings. The word combines miru (見る, "to look") and tateru (立てる, "to set up"), and became known by the Heian period (794–1185) as an act of comparison in which one thing was "seen as something else." In early literature such as waka and renga poetry, poets used mitate to layer meanings though puns and homophones. This poetic technique was later further expanded in Haikai poetry during the Edo period (1603–1868), where it developed a more humorous and subversive tone.

The adaptation from verses to visual art reflected the growing trends of parody and allusion across popular art at the time. As commercial printmaking broadened, artists began using the poetic device in imagery to compare modern people like courtesans, actors, and townspeople to classical figures of literature and legends. The term mitate-e did not become standardized until after the Edo period, likely during the eighteenth century, and similar works were often labeled as fūryū (風流, "elegant" or "up-to-date").

== Themes and characterizations ==
Mitate-e is defined by its use of analogy, substitution, and layered references to create visual and cultural associations. These veiled associations were intended for Edo-period urban audiences familiar with both classical literature and contemporary popular culture. This allowed viewers to recognize and interpret layered allusions. This also requires audiences and artists share a mutual understanding and cultural knowledge on the same topic, in order to create playful experiences. Mitate (見立て, "to liken" or "to see as") involves presenting one subject in the terms of another, producing a complex contrast between image and meaning. This exists in reality as a "seeing-as" process where the viewer can hold multiple interpretations at once, often evoking humor or irony.

In Edo-period, mitate-e can be classified into four structural types. First, the leap structure: small point of resemblance is combined with a bold shift visually in setting or meaning; Second, the humorous structure: Pleasure arises from discovering resemblance between two largely dissimilar subjects. It's about find pleasure while discovering the similarity between two very different subjects; Third, the overlapping structure: the image indicates two meanings at once. On the surface, the viewer sees a person, an object, or a scene, but on closer inspection, it also suggests another different subject. Finally, the sacred-profane mixed structure: Noble or sacred subjects are combined with ordinary or profane subjects.

For example, the Chinese scholarly theme of the "Four Accomplishments" (qinqi shuhua), which traditionally symbolizes education and literal cultivation, could be transformed into corresponding activities within the yūri: the shamisen replacing the qin, sugoroku replacing chess, love letters replacing calligraphy or books, and landscape painting on a folding screen replacing painting. In such cases, the effect of mitate is achieved through substitution.

The Third Princess (Onna Sannomiya) from The Tale of Genji was also one of the classical motifs frequently invoked in mitate-e. When this noble lady was adapted to the theme of the yūjo, it is usually under the purpose to add senses of nobility and elegance to the yūjo. In this sense, mitate-e is not just surface resemblance, but a form of visual recording that recombines classical subject matter, established visual forms, and contemporary urban subjects.

Such mitate-e were often highly formulaic and easily legible. In the case of the Third Princess, the key scene in the original narrative is the moment when, prompted by a cat, she is exposed outside the boundaries of courtly decorum and regulation. In mitate-e, this scene was often translated into a visual motif in which a cat or dog lifts a covering; the object displaced is likewise often updated from the original curtain or blind into more contemporary visual elements such as screen or the hem of a robe.

High-ranking yūjo in this period were valued not only for their appearance, but were also expected to possess skills in music, literature, and other arts in order to respond to the cultivation and aesthetic tastes of elite patrons. This association with nobility also created the conditions for the development of mitate-e.

== Notable artists ==
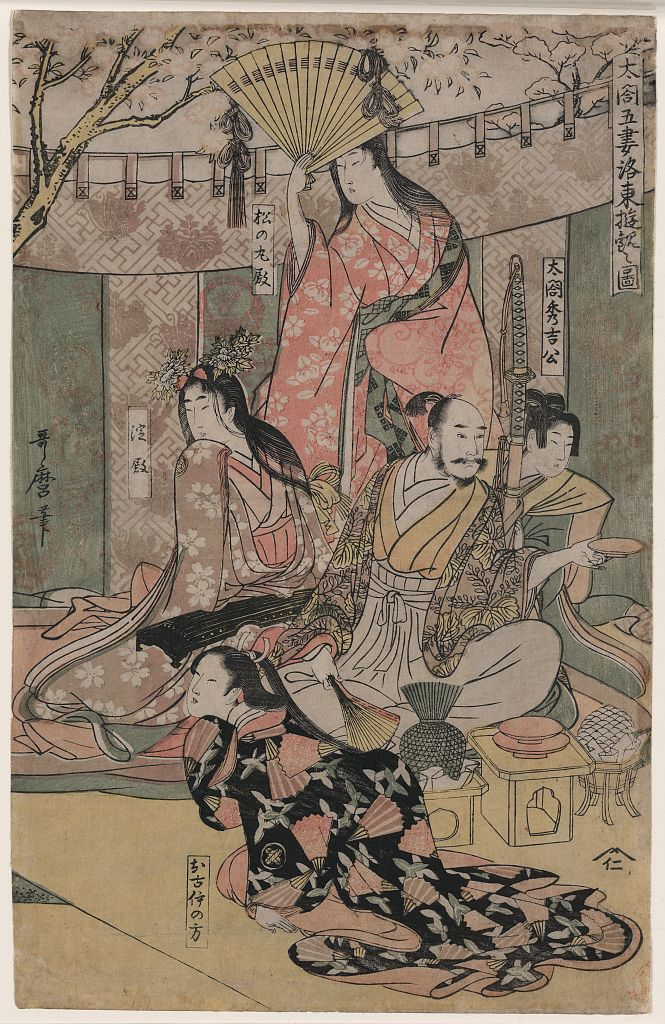
Ukiyo-e print by Kitigawa Utamaro depicting the samurai and daimyō, Totoyomi Hideyoshi, having tea and being attended to by four women.

Several prominent Edo period print-maker employed the use of mitate in their work. Masanobu has been cited as one of the earliest artists to incorporate the use of parody into woodblock prints, creating a precedent for later artists' compositions. Harunobu helped to popularize mitate-e within Edo prints by reinterpreting classical literature and seasonal imagery into contemporary contexts through colorful and engaging visual language. Harunobu's use of mitate-e was often linked to erotic, satirical, and political subject matter; sometimes causing the prints to be censored under Edo publishing laws. Artists of the Torii school and Utagawa school, including Torii Kiyonaga (1752–1815), Kunisada (1786–1865), and Utagawa Kuniyoshi (1798–1861), extended mitate-e into actor portraits using allegory to combine Kabuki actors with classical poets and motifs. Artists used these combinations to navigate censorship regulations, presenting political and controversial subjects in a way that concealed direct reference. Utamaro also utilized mitate-e when creating portraits of women and historical scenes. A depiction of Japanese samurai, Toyotomi Hideyoshi, and his concubines through the series, Taikō Gosai Rakutō Yūkan no Zu, led to Utamaro's arrest in 1804 under the Tokugawa shogunate.

== See also ==
- Metaphor
- Metonymy
- Synecdoche
