= Kawamata Tsunemasa =

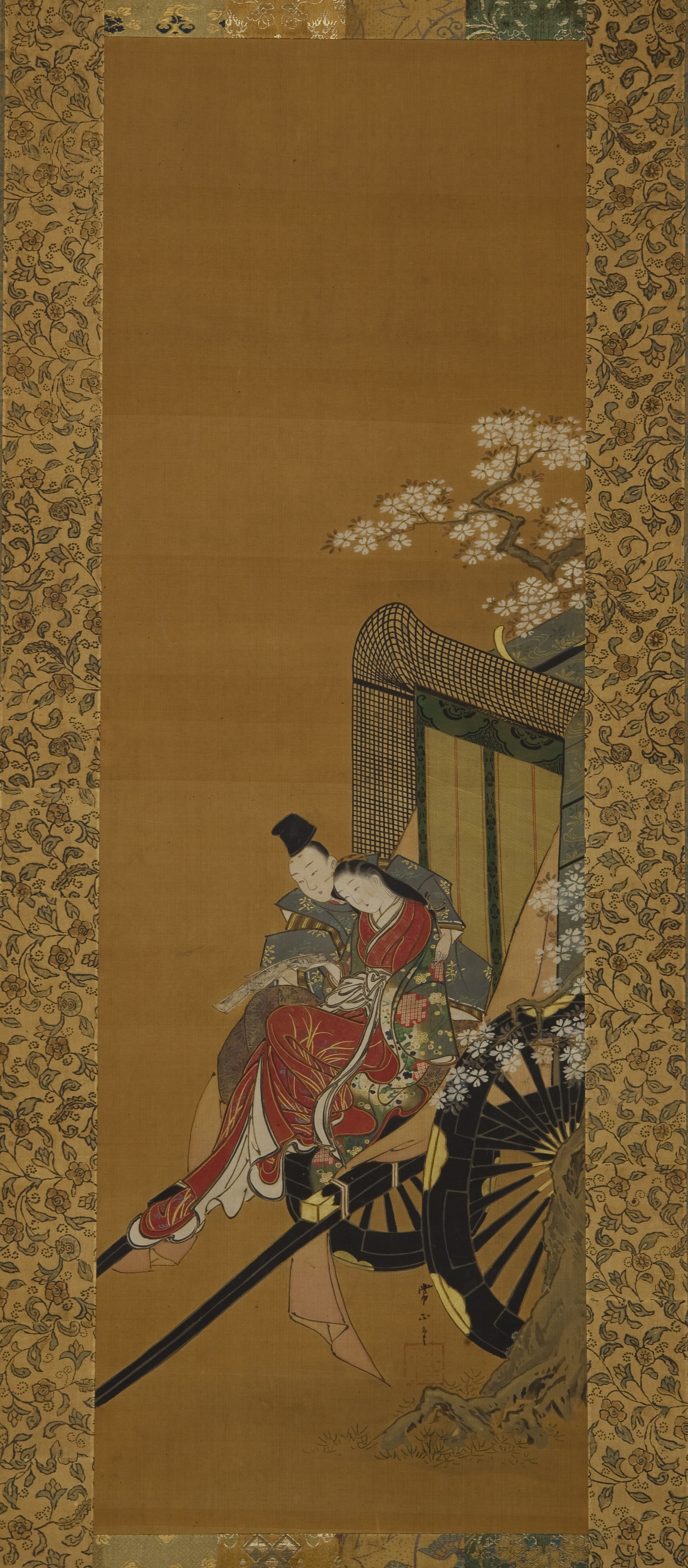
Couple Reading Love Letter

Kawamata Tsunemasa (川又 常正, birth and death dates unknown) was a Japanese ukiyo-e artist of the Kawamata school of art, active from the Genbun (1736–41) to perhaps the Meiwa (1764–72) eras. He was a disciple of the school's founder, Kawamata Tsuneyuki.

Something more than fifty paintings identified as his survive. Like many early ukiyo-e artists, Tsunemasa and the Kawamata school specialized in painting (nikuhitsu-ga) rather than designing woodblock prints. He worked primarily on bijin-ga portraits of female beauties. His later painters appear to bear the influence of Suzuki Harunobu in the style in which he depicts women. He produced many mitate-e works that allude to classical themes.

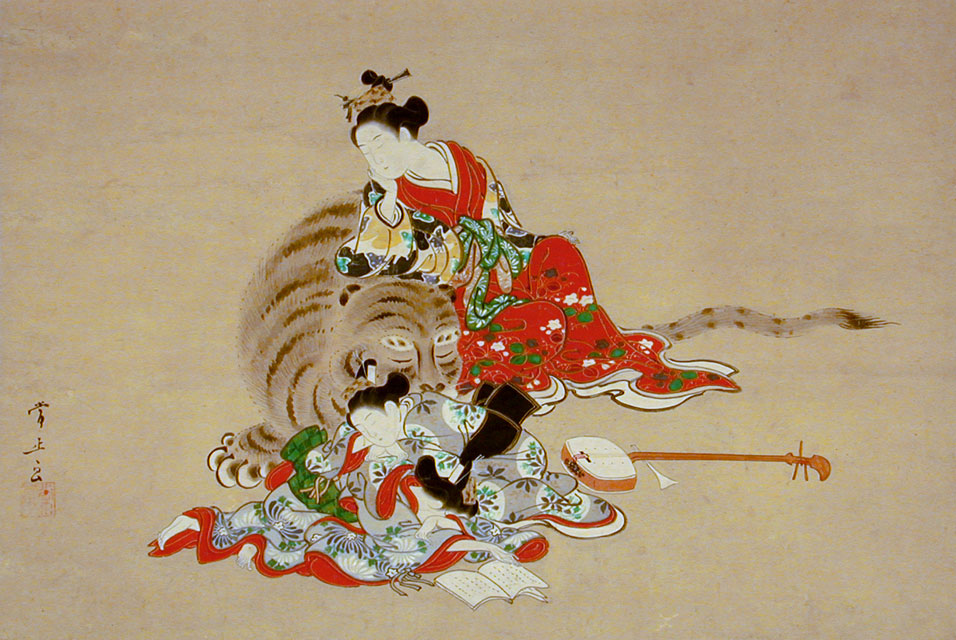
The Four Sleepers Japan, c. 1745

Tsunemasa's death date is unknown. A Kawamata Tsunetatsu (川又 常辰), of whom little is known, produced works in Tsunemasa's style during Tsunemasa's late period, and thus is presumed to have been a successor.
