= State-owned Argentine Railway Companies =

In Argentina, State-owned railway companies run both, passenger and freight services within the country. The first State-owned company was Argentine State Railway ("Ferrocarriles del Estado"), formed in October 1909 while José Figueroa Alcorta was President of Argentina.

Current State-owned companies (as of February 2015) are Operadora Ferroviaria Sociedad del Estado (DBA "Trenes Argentinos", owned by the National Government), and regional companies Ferrobaires, operated by the Buenos Aires Province and Servicios Ferroviarios Patagónico (owned by the Government of Río Negro).

== History ==
State-owned railways before nationalisation:

- Andino
- Argentino del Norte
- Central de Buenos Aires
- Central Entrerriano
- Central Norte
- Del Chaco
- Central Chubut
- Córdoba Central
- Córdoba North W.
- Patagónicos
- Primer Entrerriano
- Provincial de Buenos Aires
- Provincial de Santa Fe
- Rural de Buenos Aires
- State Railway

In 1948 the railway network of Argentina was nationalised by President Juan Domingo Perón. The previously privately owned French and British railway companies, together with a number of companies that had been nationalised earlier, (Córdoba Central Railway, 1939, and others), were formed into the following six state-owned companies:

- FC Sarmiento
- FC Mitre
- FC Belgrano
- FC Roca
- FC San Martín
- FC Urquiza

These six companies later amalgamated to form Ferrocarriles Argentinos.

In 1991, President of Argentina Carlos Menem led the privatization of the entire railway network. While the process was completed, a provisional company, FEMESA, took over the operation of the urban services in Buenos Aires Province previously managed by Ferrocarriles Argentinos.

Two years later, the UEPFP (later "Ferrobaires") was established by the Buenos Aires Province Government in order to run long-distance services that had been previously closed by the National Government.

Nevertheless, some temporary consortiums (such as UGOFE and UGOMS) were formed after the contracts of some TBA and Metropolitano private companies were revoked for failing to fulfill their obligations.

Today, the main state-owned railway company is the new Ferrocarriles Argentinos and its subsidiaries, while other companies like Ferrobaires are owned by local provincial governments.

== See also ==
- Rail transport in Argentina
