= Servicios Ferroviarios Patagónico =

Railway company in Argentina

Tren Patagónico
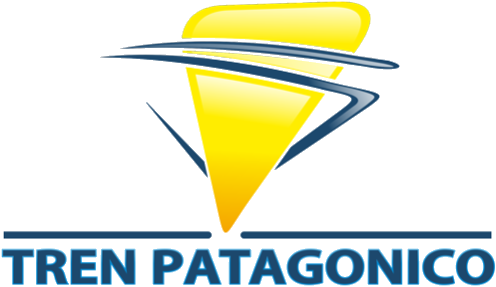

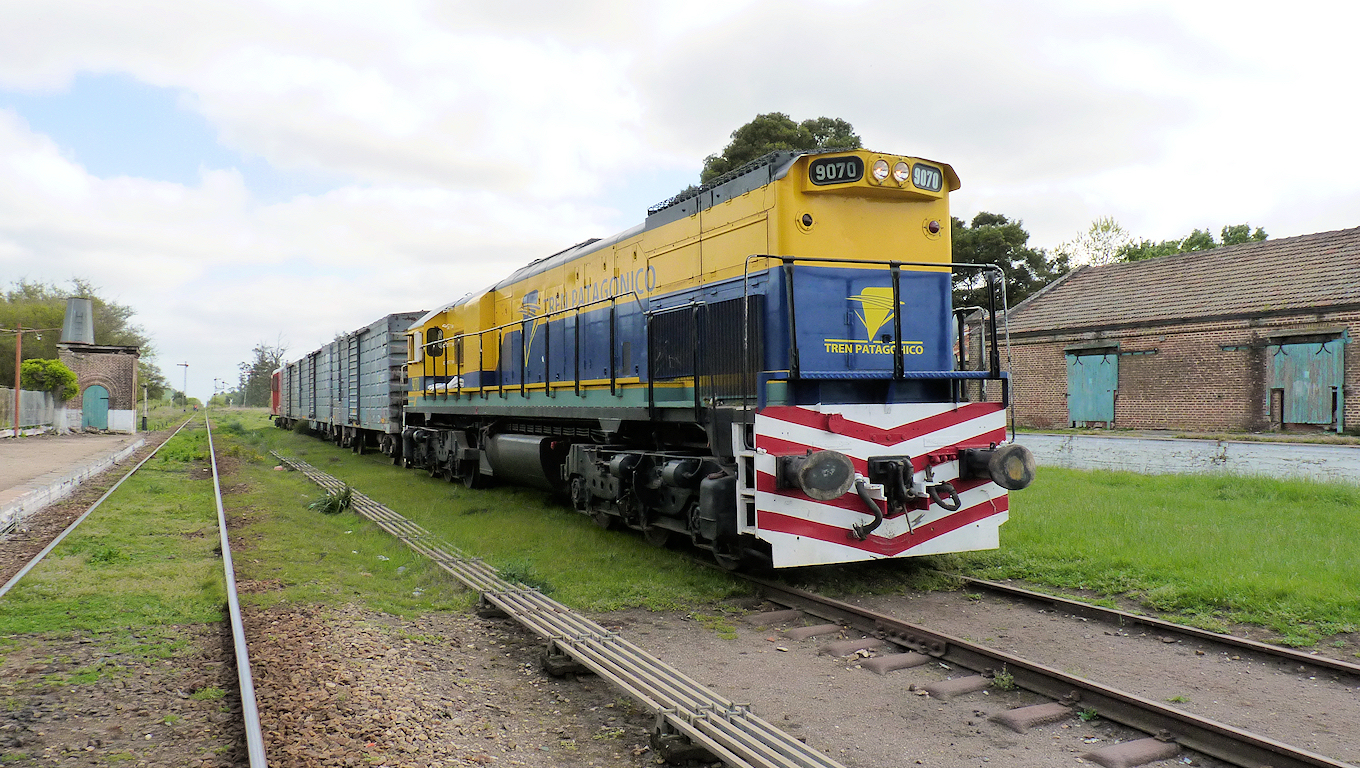
- Freight train at Camet station in 2011
- Formerly: Servicios Ferroviarios Patagónicos (SEFEPA)
- Type: S.A.
- Industry: Railway
- Founded: 1993; 33 years ago
- Headquarters: Argentina
- Number of locations: 4 (Viedma, San Antonio Oeste, Ing. Jacobacci, Bariloche)
- Area served: Río Negro
- Services: Public transport
- Revenue: 700 passengers per service (2014)
- Owner: Government of Río Negro
- Website: trenpatagonicosa.com.ar

Tren Patagónico (in English: "Patagonian Train") is a state-owned company of Río Negro Province in Argentina which operates an 827-kilometre-long (514 mi) 5 ft 6 in (1,676 mm) broad gauge railway line between Viedma and San Carlos de Bariloche.

The train also runs a shorter distance service from Ing. Jacobacci to Bariloche.

== History ==
The railway line was originally built and operated by Ferrocarriles Patagónicos, the southern division of Argentine State Railway ("Ferrocarriles del Estado Argentino"). When the Government of Argentina led by President Juan Perón nationalised the French and English companies of Argentina in 1948, the line was taken over by the General Roca Railway, a division of then-recent state-owned Ferrocarriles Argentinos.

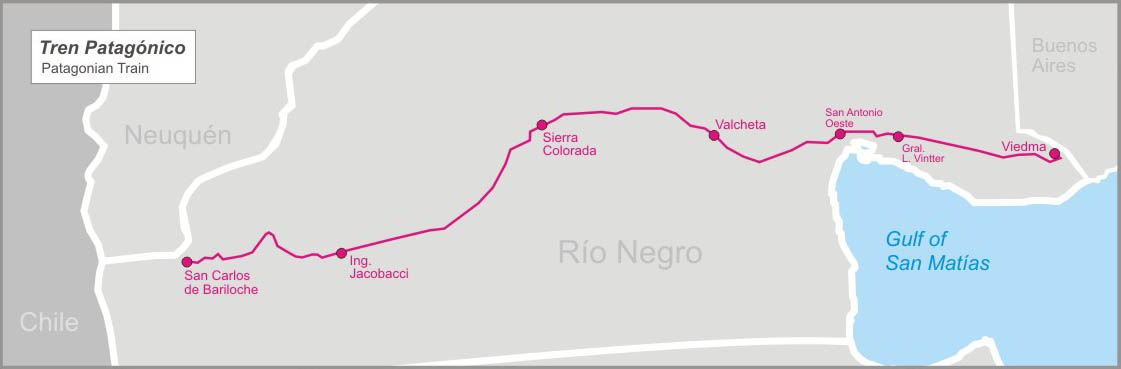
Route map

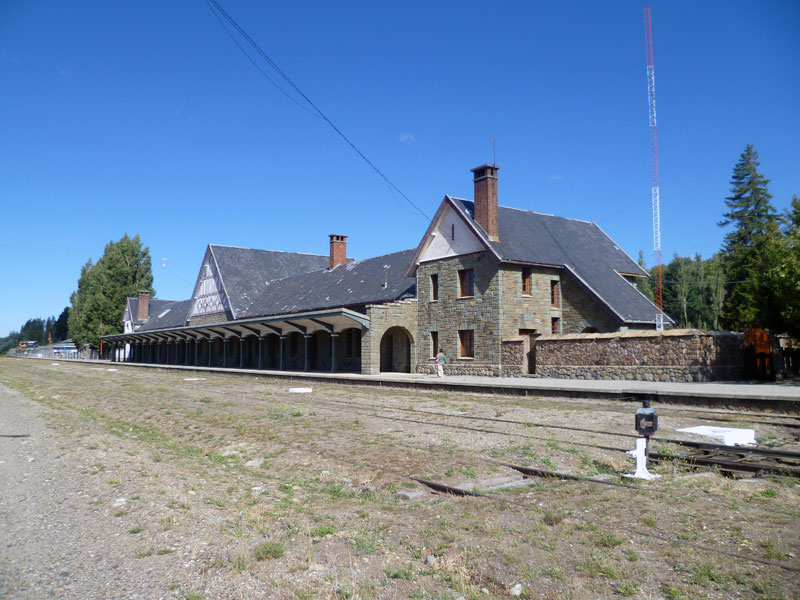
Bariloche station, termini

With the increase in popularity of the line with tourists, it was decided to improve the image of the company by using the name Tren Patagónico.

As part of a railway privatisation carried out during the presidency of Carlos Menem from 1991, a concession to operate the line was granted to the Provincial government and later transferred to "Servicios Ferroviarios Patagónicos" (SEFEPA) in September 1993. Apart from its popularity with tourists, the line provides a vital service for people living along its length. From Viedma the line serves regional cities such as San Antonio Oeste, Ministro Ramos Mexía, Ingeniero Jacobacci, Pilcaniyeu and San Carlos de Bariloche.

After a time without service due to lack of diesel locomotives, the train was put into operation again in May 2014, under the new name "Tren Patagónico" after the National Government signed an agreement with Río Negro in which the Nation committed to restart the service.

In January 2015, the Government of Río Negro announced that $ 2,5 million would be invested in the modernization of the line. Works include the replacement of 12-km length rail tracks in order to avoid technical problems previously reported, such as derailments or tracks break off. The Government considers the train an important source of income for the Province, having reached 100% of occupation during the 2015 Summer season.

== See also ==
- Ferrocarriles Patagónicos
