= Central Chubut Railway =

Former railway company in Argentina (1888–1958)

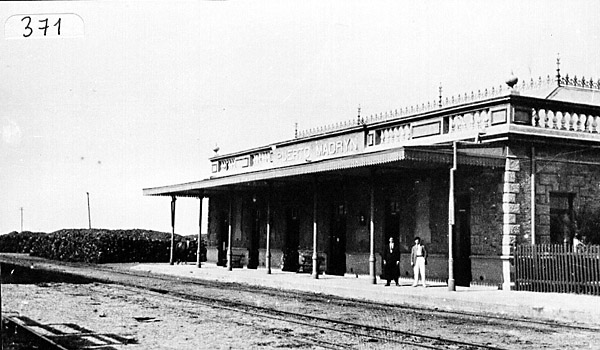
- Puerto Madryn terminus, c. 1930.

Overview
- Native name: Ferrocarril Central del Chubut
- Status: Defunct
- Owner: Government of Argentina
- Locale: Chubut
- Termini: Puerto Madryn; Las Plumas

Service
- Type: Inter-city
- Operator(s): Ferrocarriles Argentinos
- Ridership: 197,936 (1948)

History
- Opened: 1888; 137 years ago
- Closed: 1958; 67 years ago

Technical
- Track gauge: 750 mm (2 ft 5 1/2 in)
- Old gauge: 1,000 mm (3 ft 3 3/8 in) metre gauge
Route map
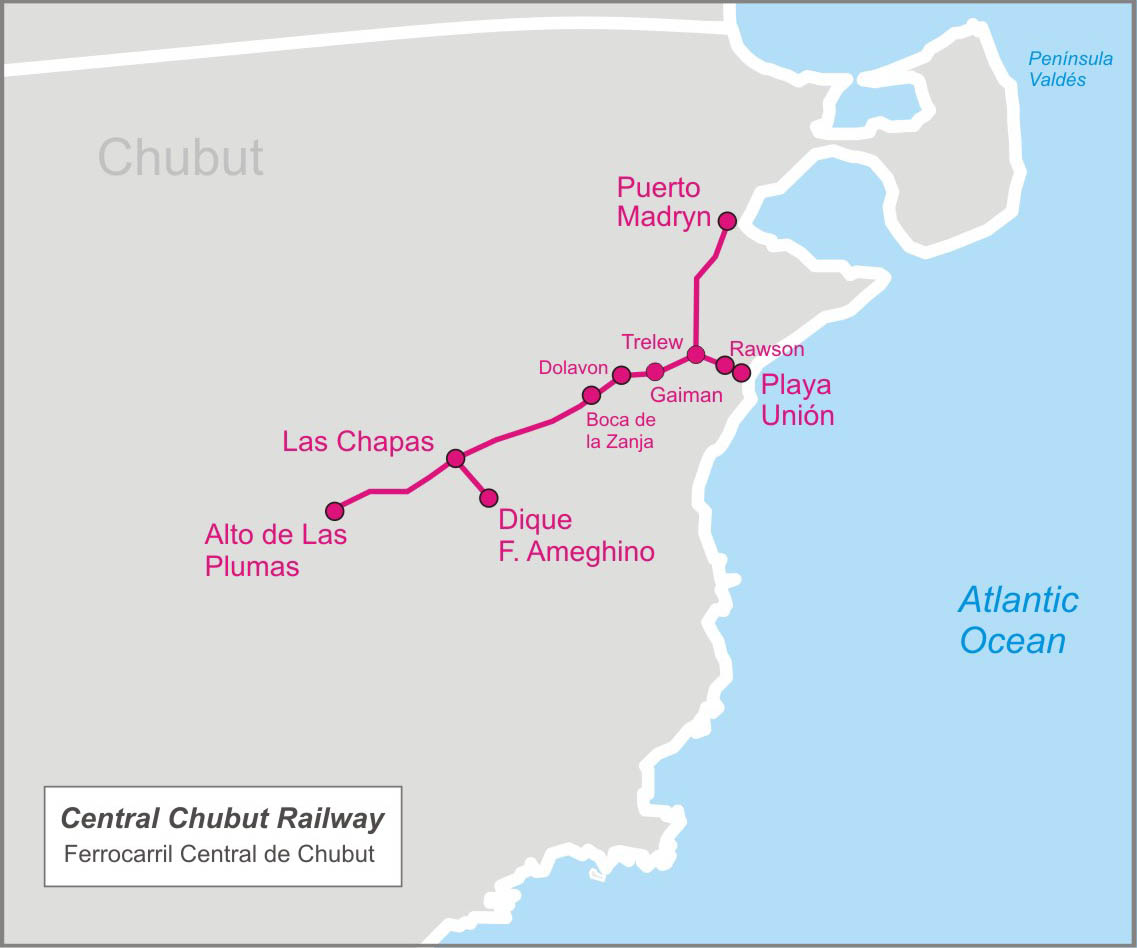

The Central Chubut Railway (in Spanish: Ferrocarril Central del Chubut) was a British-owned company that built and operated a 1,000 mm (3 ft 3 3/8 in) metre gauge railway line in the Argentine province of Chubut in the Patagonia region at the end of the 19th. century.

== History ==
=== Beginning ===
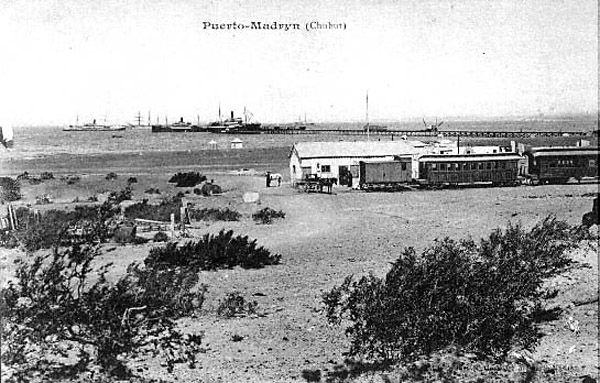
Locomotive in Puerto Madryn, 1888

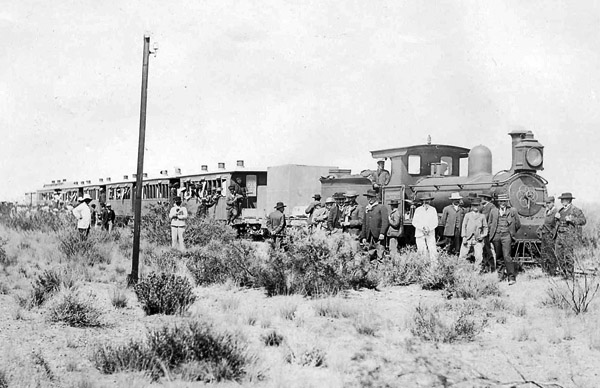
Locomotive and workers in Torre José, c. 1900

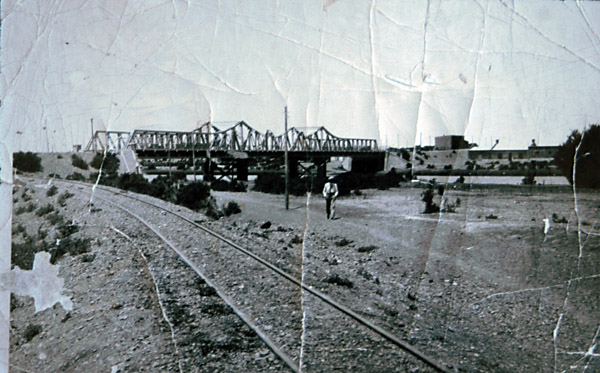
Railway bridge in Rawson, 1920s

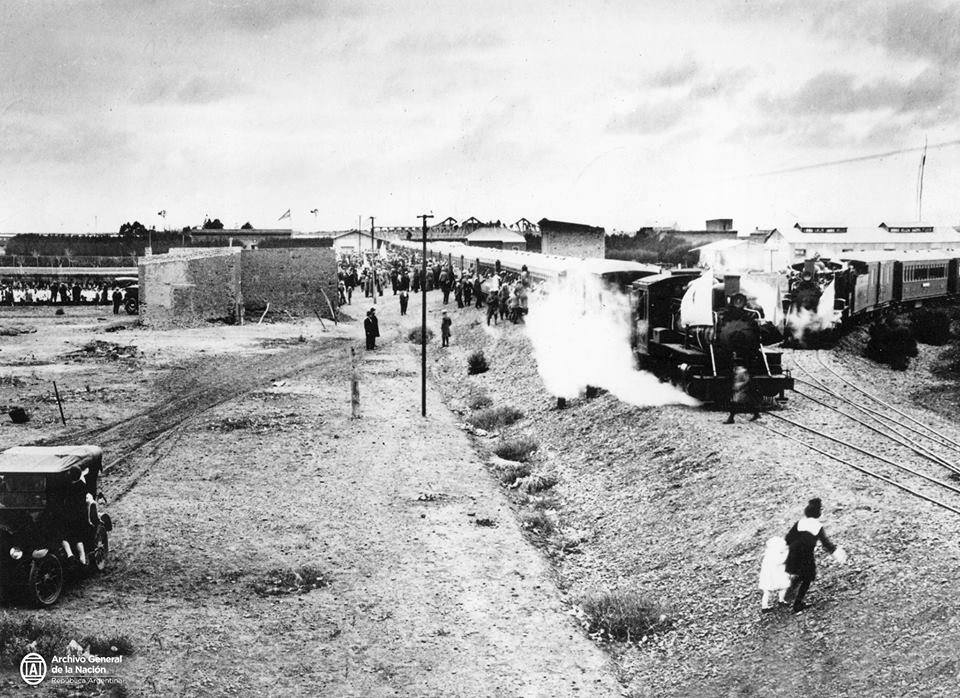
Locomotive at Rawson, 1923

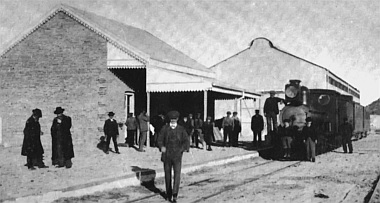
Gaiman station, c. 1920

In 1884 the Argentine government granted the Welsh immigrant Lewis Jones a concession to build and operate a railway between the valley of the Chubut River and Porth Madryn on the southern side of the Península Valdés. With the help of Asahel P. Bell, an engineer, Jones set up a company in Liverpool, England to finance the construction.

In October 1884, Law No. 1539 that allowed company to build the line, was promulgated. Works began in 1886, directed by engineer Jones Williams, in both cities simultaneously, Puerto Madryn and Trelew. Apart from the local workers, several groups of immigrants were brought from Italy, Spain, Syria, Wales among other countries on the Vesta ship.

On 11 November 1888, a line 70 km long between Trelew and the quay in Puerto Madryn was opened. It included the first telephone line of the region. Journey time (that were made on horseback) reduced from 20 hours to only 2 hours in train. From Trelew the line was extended 50 km to Gaiman on 31 December 1908 and from there to Dolavon on 12 October 1915. In 1910 a 450-mt. length dock was opened in Puerto Madryn. The railway station would be opened three years after.

=== Nationalisation ===
In 1920 the company was nationalised, being added to Ferrocarriles Patagónicos of Argentine State Railway network. Soon after, the railway extended its tracks to Las Plumas. CCR's track gauge was converted to 750 mm (2 ft 5 1/2 in) in 1922, and later the line was extended from Dolavon to Las Plumas.

In 1923 the branch to Rawson and Playa Unión was built. In 1945 another branch from Las Chapas to Florentino Ameghino levee was opened. That branch was used to carry cement from Comodoro Rivadavia, moving around 1,500 ton per month. A project to extend the railway from Las Plumas to Paso de Indios was never carried out. The Government alleged technical issues for that decision.

The dismissed project included to extend the CCR line to Trevelin and Esquel (to make a connection with La Trochita to Ingeniero Jacobacci) and then with Comodoro Rivadavia Railway to reach the city of Comodoro Rivadavia as well. It was also expected that the Government acquired diesel locomotives and built a broad gauge line from Puerto Madryn to Sierra Grande, connecting with the Nahuel Huapi railway in San Antonio Oeste.

Other plans foresaw to use bus services to help railway lines. According to Clement Dumrauf, the railway was not expanded due to British settlers that were interested in preserve the Patagonia region only for sheep farming. Another version stated that livestock company "La Argentina Southern Land Company" refused to the construction of a line when they realised about the poor quality of the soil, which would be used to finance the construction.

With the railway Nationalisation in Argentina of 1948, the CCR became part of Roca Railway, one of the six divisions of state-owned company Ferrocarriles Argentinos.

A report made in 1949 stated that the CCR carried less than half of the number of passengers that the Comodoro Rivadavia Railway did and the same cargo as the Puerto Deseado Railway. The company reached its peak in 1948 with 197,936 passengers carried. It decreased to 161,805 one year later due to a Chubut River flood that interrupted services from July to August. In 1950 the Argentine state acquired a railcar for the Trelew-Rawson line and built 17 houses for workers in Puerto Madryn and 8 in Trelew. The Government also renewed rail tracks and the Puerto Madryn dock's floor.

=== Decline and closure ===
As the railway line had been constructed in narrow gauge (1,000 mm while being Welsh-owned, then changed to 750 mm when it became state-owned), the CRR could not be connected with the rest of Argentine railway network. A 1960 report declared operating costs of A$ 42,876,527.00 and only $7,867,092 of revenue. In 1956 trains carried 70,931 tons, decreasing to 29,339 four years later, due to strong competition with road transport.

The line was finally closed in 1958 during Arturo Frondizi's administration. Three years later, part of the rolling stock was sold as spare while the other part was transferred to La Trochita.

There was a project to re-open the line in 1964, although it was strongly resisted by local bus companies. While rail tracks were untouched and the rolling stock stored at warehouses in Trelew, 15 coaches were destroyed by fire, which caused the project to be suspended indefinitely. Rail tracks were finally dismantled between 1969 and 1974. Nevertheless, by 1975 some rolling stock was still preserved, such as three Henschel & Son locomotives and some cargo wagons.

After the closure, some station buildings were used for other activities, such as Trelew and Puerto Madryn (serving as bus terminus). The former station buildings at Trelew and Gaiman are museums nowadays. while Playa Unión station is used as a police station. Stations from Campamento Villegas to Las Plumas were used as farmsteads.

== Gallery ==
Relics

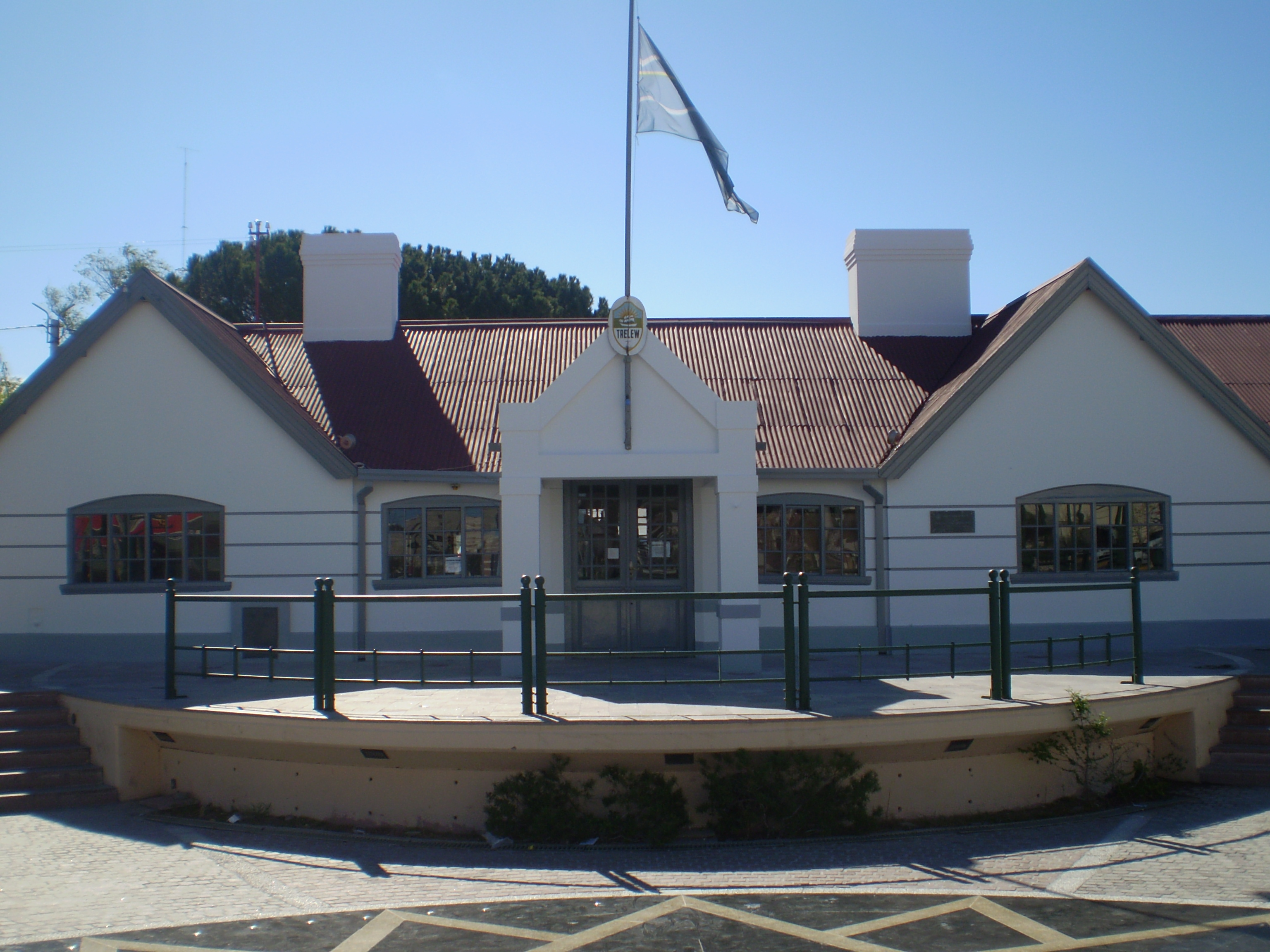
Trelew station nowadays

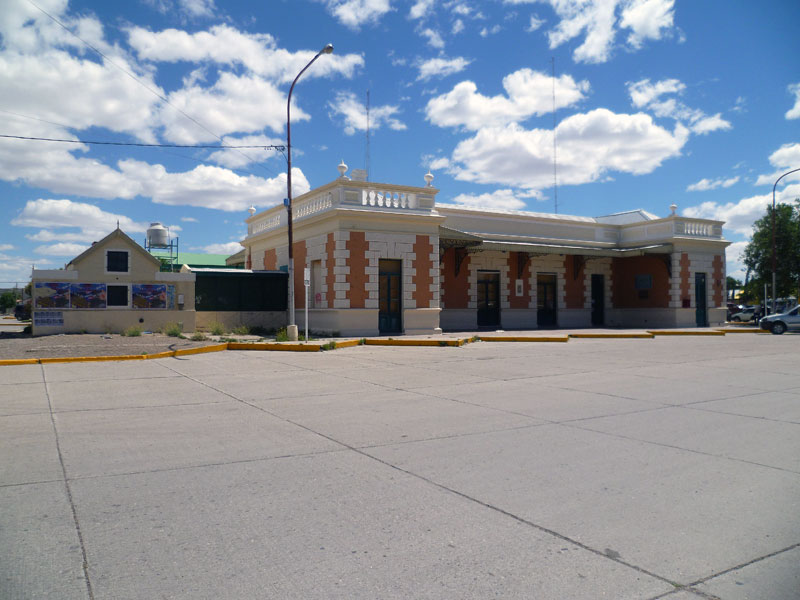
Former P. Madryn station in 2011

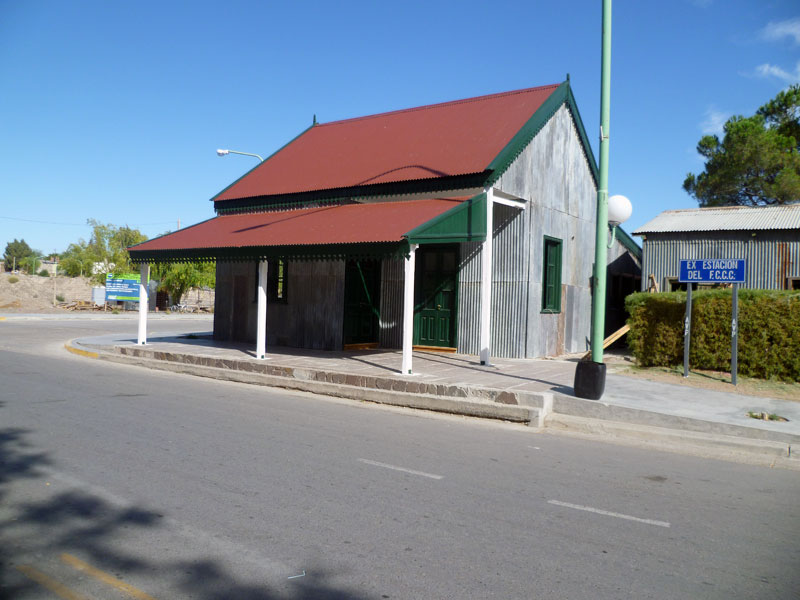
Dolavon station nowadays

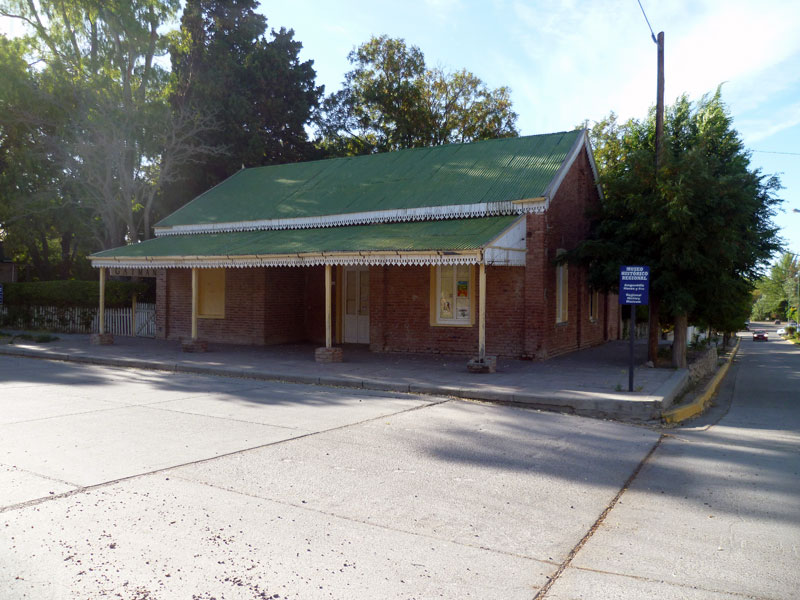
Gaiman station, 2011

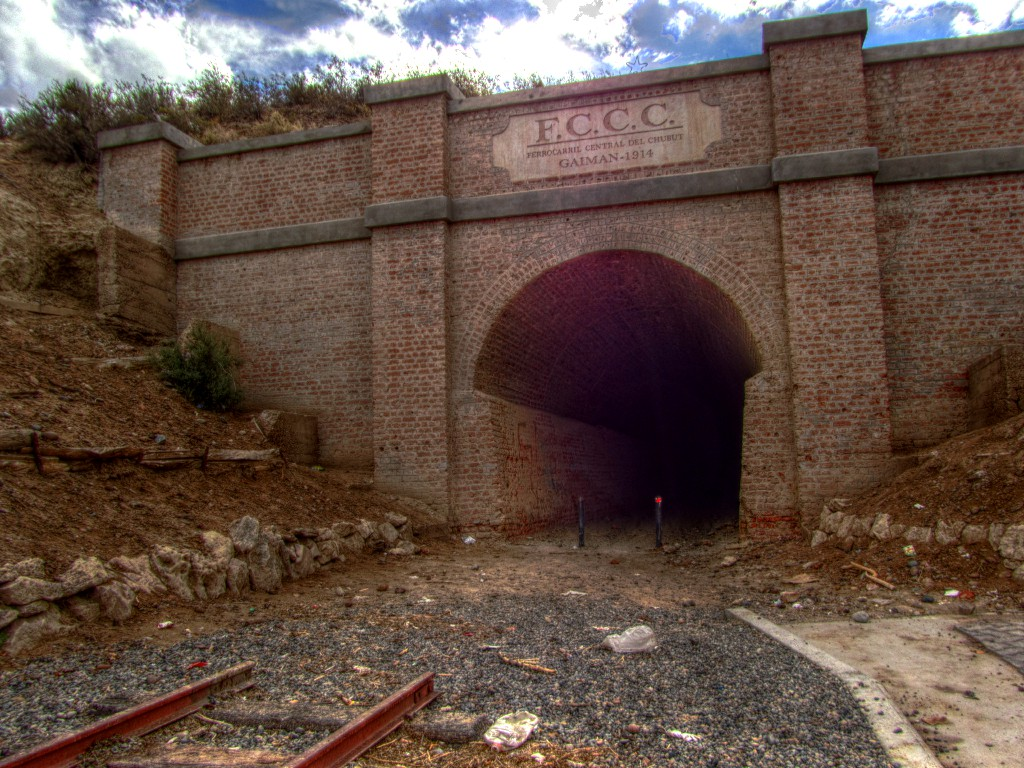
Entrance to the old Gaiman tunnel

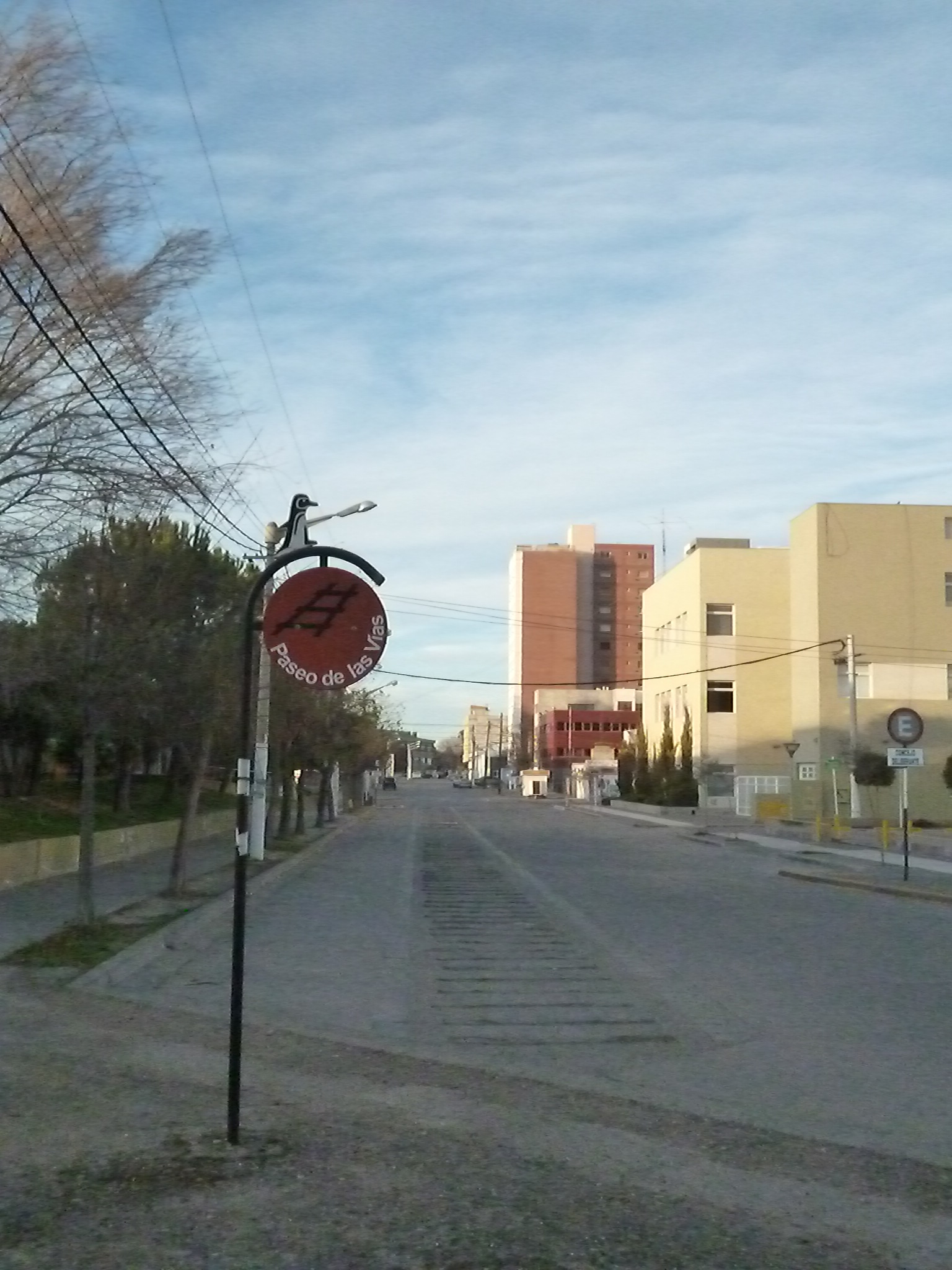
"Paseo de las Vías" in Trelew

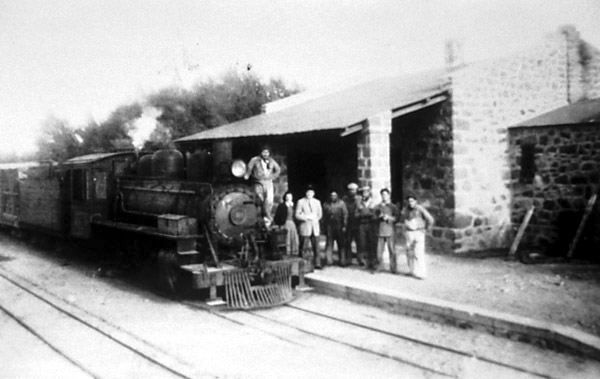
Boca de la Zanja station, c. 1930

== See also ==
- Ferrocarriles Patagónicos
- Roca Railway
- Y Wladfa
