= Ingeniero Jacobacci Airport =

Airport in Argentina

Ingeniero Jacobacci Airport Aeropuerto Cabo FAA H R Bordón
- IATA: IGB; ICAO: SAVJ

Summary
- Airport type: Public
- Serves: Ingeniero Jacobacci, Argentina
- Elevation AMSL: 2,927 ft / 892 m
- Coordinates: 41°19′15″S 69°34′30″W

Map
- Location in Argentina

Runways
Direction	Length		Surface
Direction	m	ft	Surface
07/25	2,100	6,890	Asphalt
- Sources: WAD Google Maps GCM

Ingeniero Jacobacci Airport (IATA: IGB, ICAO: SAVJ), also known as Capitán FAA H. R. Bordón Airport, is an airport serving Ingeniero Jacobacci, a town in the Río Negro Province of Argentina. The airport is on a low mesa above the town, which is in a wide, dry river channel.

== See also ==
- Transport in Argentina
- List of airports in Argentina
