= Puerto Deseado Railway =

Argentine railway company (1911–1978)

Puerto Deseado and Colonia Las Heras Railway
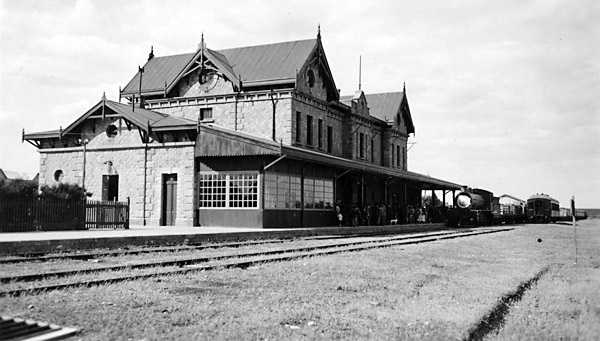
- Puerto Deseado station, 1936

Overview
- Native name: Ferrocarril Puerto Deseado a Colonia Las Heras
- Status: Defunct company; railway inactive
- Owner: Government of Argentina
- Locale: Santa Cruz
- Termini: Puerto Deseado; Las Heras
- Stations: 14

Service
- Type: Inter-city
- Operator(s): Argentine State R (1909–48); Ferrocarriles Argentinos (1948–78)

History
- Opened: September 20, 1909
- Closed: January 15, 1978; 48 years ago

Technical
- Line length: 286 km (178 mi)
- Track gauge: 1,676 mm (5 ft 6 in)
Route map
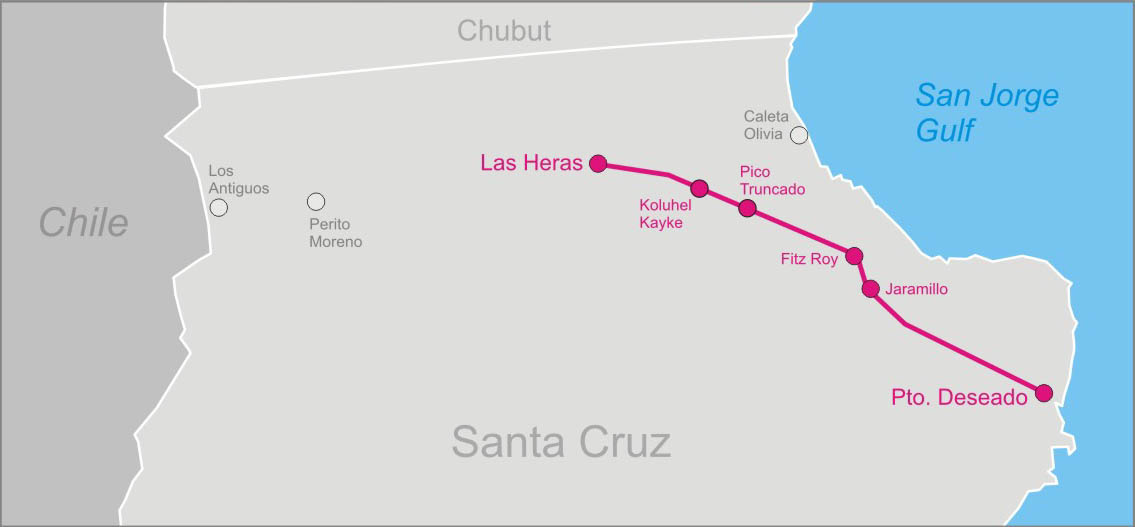

The Puerto Deseado and Colonia Las Heras Railway (native name: "Ferrocarril Puerto Deseado a Colonia Las Heras") was a State-owned railway company that ran between the cities of Puerto Deseado to Colonia Las Heras in Santa Cruz Province. The 286-km broad gauge railway was established with the intention of encouraging settlement in Patagonia, which was sparsely populated at that point. The railway also contributed to the commercialisation of wool in the region.

The railway was considered the southernmost passenger railway in the world, due to other lines of the region focusing on exploitation and transport of natural resources (such as the Comodoro Rivadavia Railway did with petroleum) rather than operating passenger services.

== History ==
=== Background ===
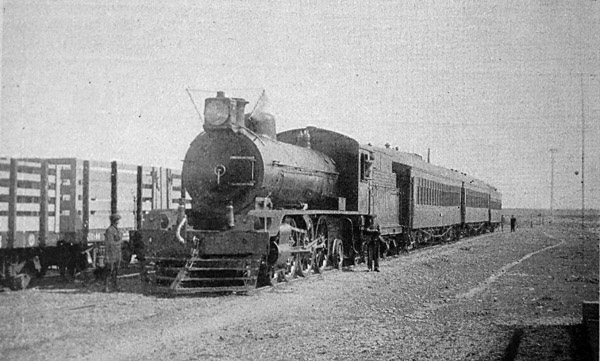
Passenger train near Las Heras, late 1920s.

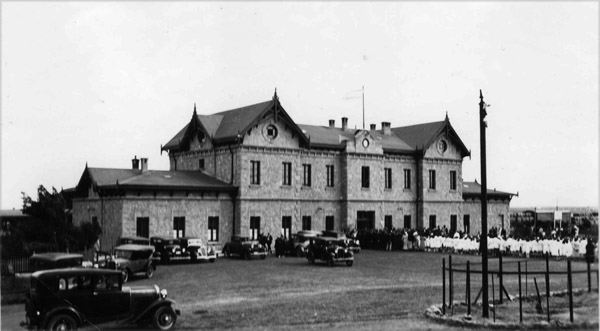
Puerto Deseado in the 1930s.

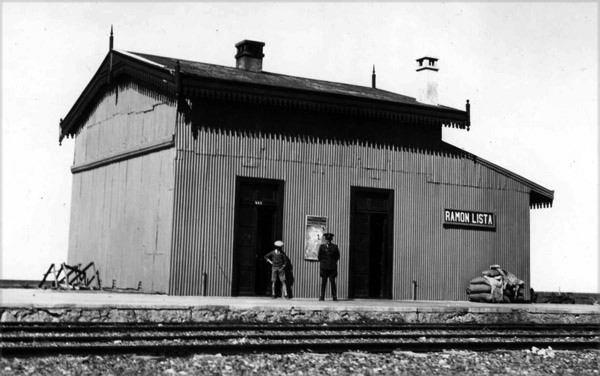
Ramón Lista, 1934.

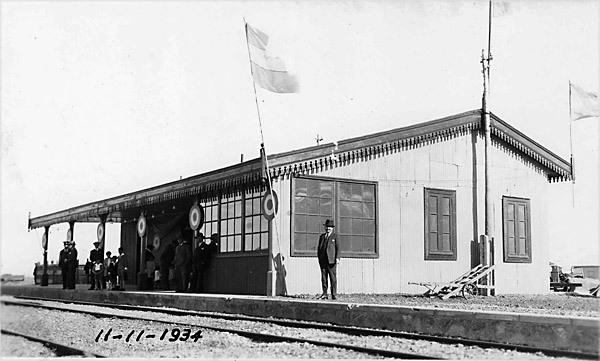
Las Heras terminus, 11 Nov 1934.

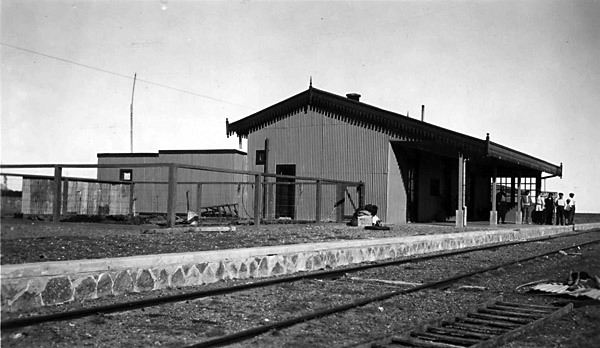
Jaramillo station (1936).

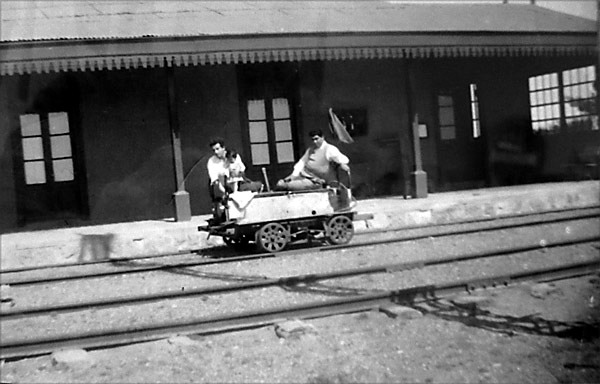
Workers at Tellier (1940).

The construction of the line was promulgated by Law N° 5559 in 1908, during José Figueroa Alcorta's presidency.

Lines to be built were as follows:

- Puerto San Antonio (Rio Negro) to Nahuel Huapi lake;
- Puerto Deseado to link with line to Nahuel Huapi, with a branch to Comodoro Rivadavia that crossed Colonia Sarmiento. Other branches to Buenos Aires were also included in the project.

The ambitious project planned to build a railway that crossed Patagonia to the northwest, then joining with the San Antonio Oeste-Bariloche line. Nevertheless, the line was not extended. Some versions stated that the railway was not expanded due to British settlers' interests in preserving the Patagonia region only for sheep farming. Other versions stated that livestock company "La Argentina Southern Land Company" refused the construction of a line when they realised the poor quality of the land, which would be used to finance the construction.

Other reasons for the cancellation of the project were the crisis caused by the World War I and some politicians that questioned the National Government's designation of funds for southern enterprises instead of sending them to the Pampa region, as well as the death of Roque Sáenz Peña in 1914.

=== Development ===
Construction began in Puerto Deseado in May 1909, with works being led by engineer Juan Briano. At the end of 1911 trains began to run up to Pico Truncado, the first terminus of the line. During its first year of service, the PD&CLHR carried 1,235 people and 1,950 tons of cargo. By 1912 they had increased to 2,370 and 4,208 respectively.

In 1912 the railway reached Las Heras, which would be its definitive terminus. Nevertheless, the National Government decided to reduce the amount of money sent to the line. In spite of the requests by regional neighborhoods demanding a longer railway line, it never happened. Besides, the route chosen for the railway was criticised due to it ran parallel to the sea, adversely competing against the ports of Caleta Olivia, Cabo Blanco and Mazaredo because of the lower costs to transport wool by sea.

One of the last proposals to extend the line came in 1927 when deputy Guillermo Fonrouge suggested to build a branch to connect Holdich station with Las Heras, also joining the Comodoro Rivadavia Railway. Nevertheless, the initiative did not come to fruition. Years later, Holldich became a ghost town. The last attempt to extend the line came with the proposal of building a branch to the oil wells in Cañadón Seco, to connect both railways, Puerto Deseado and Comodoro Rivadavia, although the idea would be never carried out.

Fourteen stations were built along the line, with a distance of 20 km (12 mi) between them. Only a few stations became villages while most of them remained as simple stops along the way. After the nationalisation of the whole Argentine railway network in 1948, the Puerto Deseado Railway became part of State-owned Ferrocarril General Roca.

During the 1940s, freight transport had decreased considerably. The most loaded merchandise were sheep, wool, agricultural products, limestone and lead. Trains also carried zinc, iron and copper that came from Chile by Buenos Aires Lake and then carried in trucks to Las Heras.

In 1949 brand-new railcars were added to the line, what contributed to increase the number of passengers. The State also built houses for employees of the railway. Trains departed from Puerto Deseado three times a week. The railcars had a capacity of 42 passengers.

=== Decline and closure ===
During the 1950s trains transported oil for private companies (therefore YPF was not included). During the 1960s both passengers and freight services decreased resoundingly. From 1961-67 trains carried less than 10,000 people and 10 tons, with few exceptions such as 1962-63 (25 tons). In the last years of operation, lead from Lago Carreras in Chile was the most carried merchandise.

The Argentine Government did not make any investment in the railway, so the rolling stock became obsolete. In the 1970s passenger services were served by two old Drewry railcars at 30 km/h (19 mph). Freight transport had decreased to one or two services in a month. Finally in 1978, the de facto government led by Jorge Videla closed the Puerto Deseado Railway. The Government alleged economic problems as the main reason for the closure as the deficit was considerably high.

The line was also completely dismantled, with the wagons, workshops and locomotives sold to wrecking yards. Nevertheless, some of them were preserved. Unlike the Comodoro Rivadavia Railway, rail tracks remained intact but they would deteriorate as time passed.

On December 1, 1996, the historic "Km. 200" station in Pico Truncado was destroyed by a fire.

In 2009, Correo Argentino, the National post service, released a special edition stamp commemorating the Puerto Deseado Railway's 100th anniversary. The stamp showed a steam locomotive and the Puerto Deseado station building, c. 1930.

== Post-closure ==
=== Remanent ===
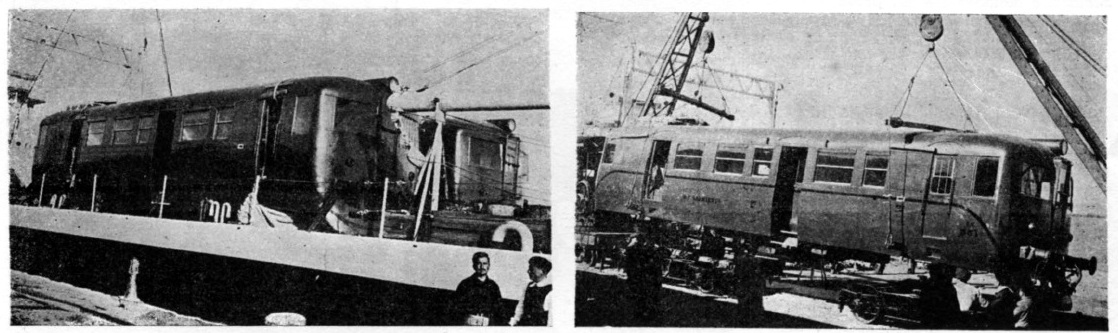
Drewry railcars being unloaded in Puerto Deseado, 1949.

All the PD&CLH rolling stock was dismantled and auctioned instead of preserving it from deterioration. Only one railcar made of wood would be preserved.

In December 1980 the coach N° 502, that had been built by British company Lancaster in 1898, was declared provincial cultural heritage and therefore preserved. This coach had been served in Ferrocarril Andino that connected Cuyo region with the Litoral ports. During its years of service at the PD&CLH line, the 502 was used as a first class coach and also carried troops that fought workers on strike during the Patagonia rebelde in 1921.

The 502 coach currently operates as a tourism office in Puerto Deseado.

Among the material preserved from destruction was a railcar built in Argentina with a 12-seat capacity. Nevertheless, it is currently abandoned. In July 2014, the historic first class P-111 coach was sent to the city of Jaramillo to be restored and preserved. That relic was abandoned in the Rawson regional hospital's backyard, where it had been left in 1986. The Secretary of Culture of Santa Cruz made the arrangements to move the wagon to Jaramillo. The P-111 was carried by truck during a four days trip, taking alternative roads to preserve it from damage since its big size didn't make it suitable to cross the narrow bridges of the region. The P-111 has a weight of 26 tons and was built in 1898.

=== Gallery ===
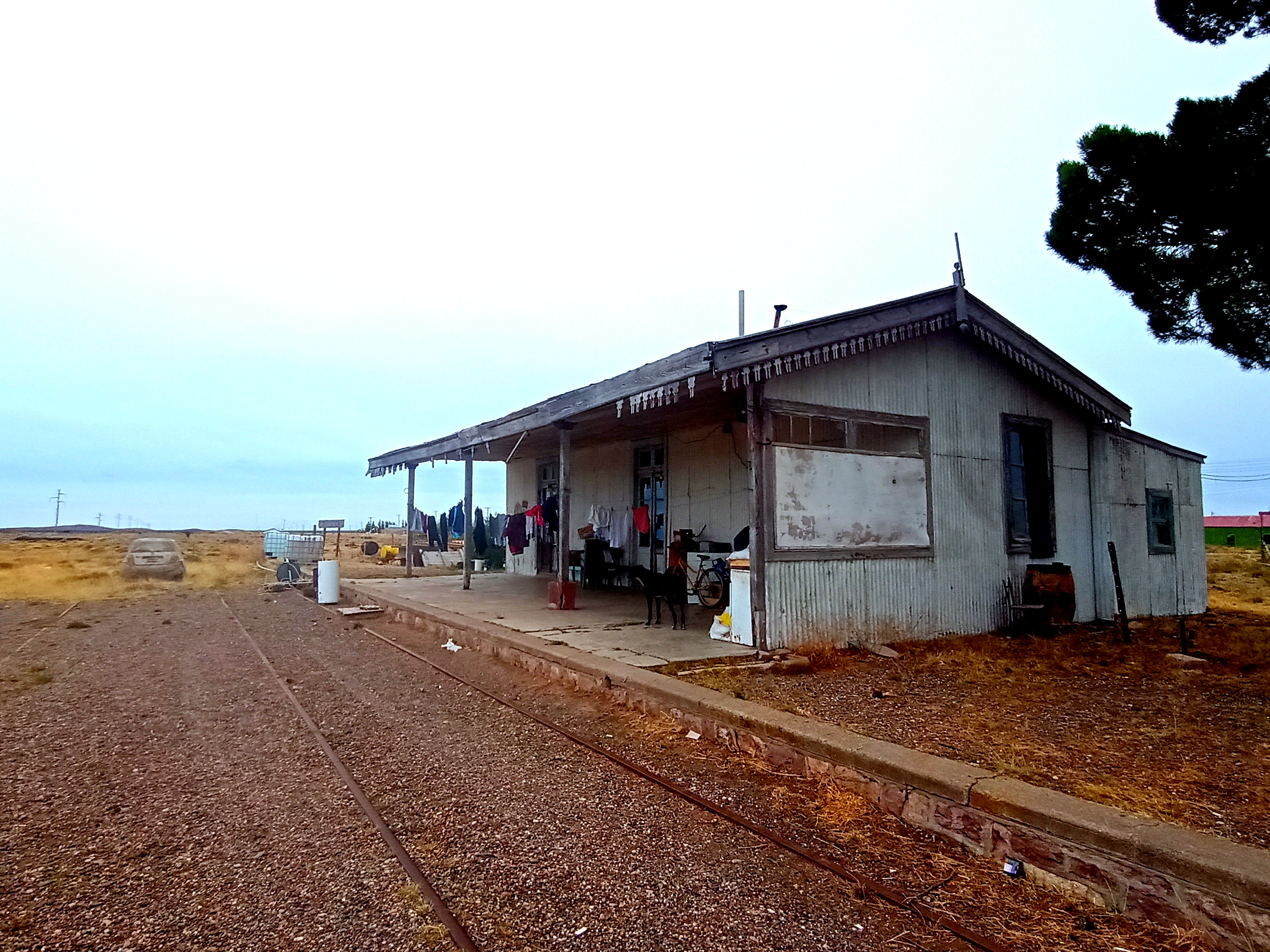
Tellier, 2025

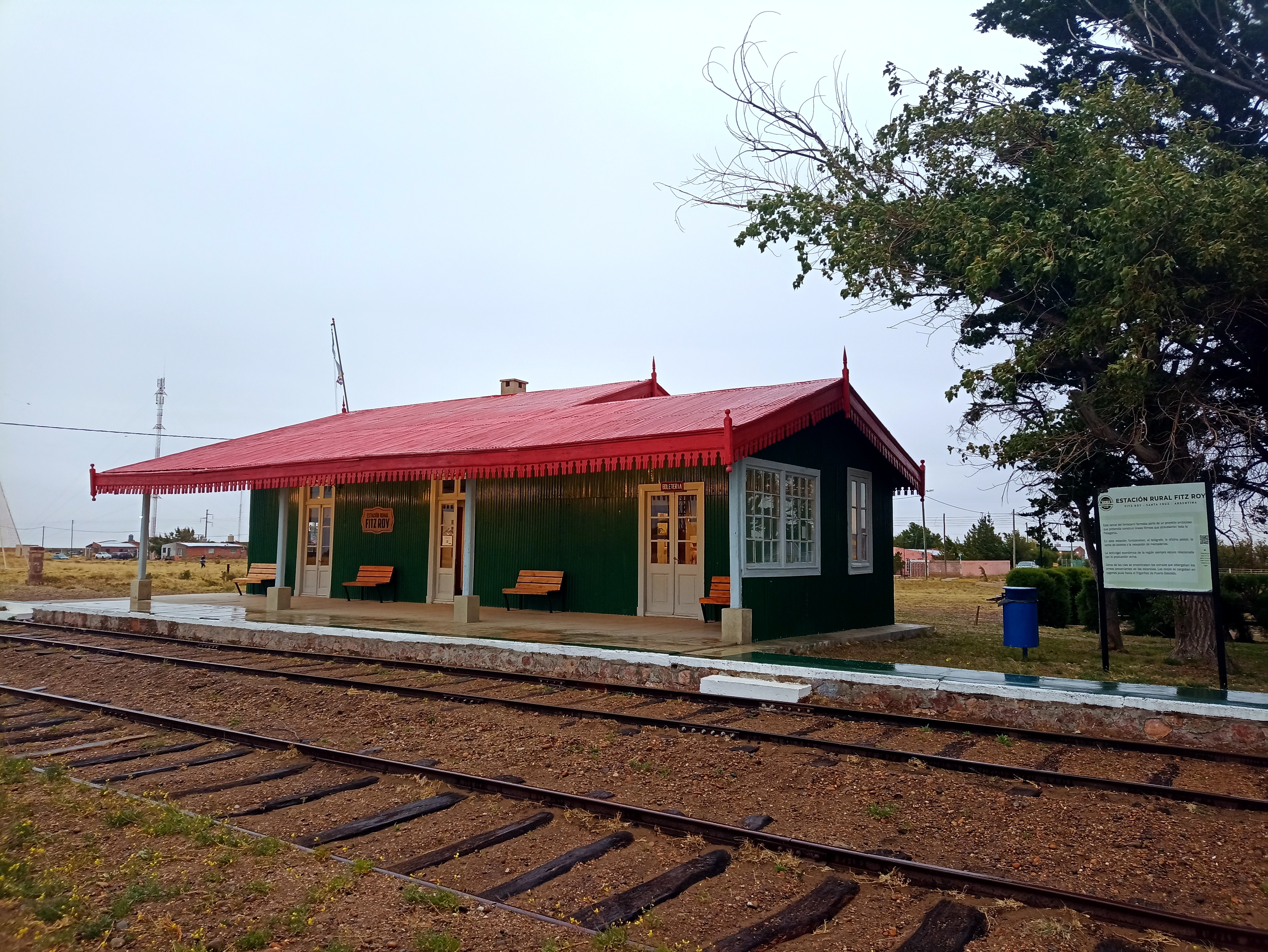
Fitz Roy, 2025

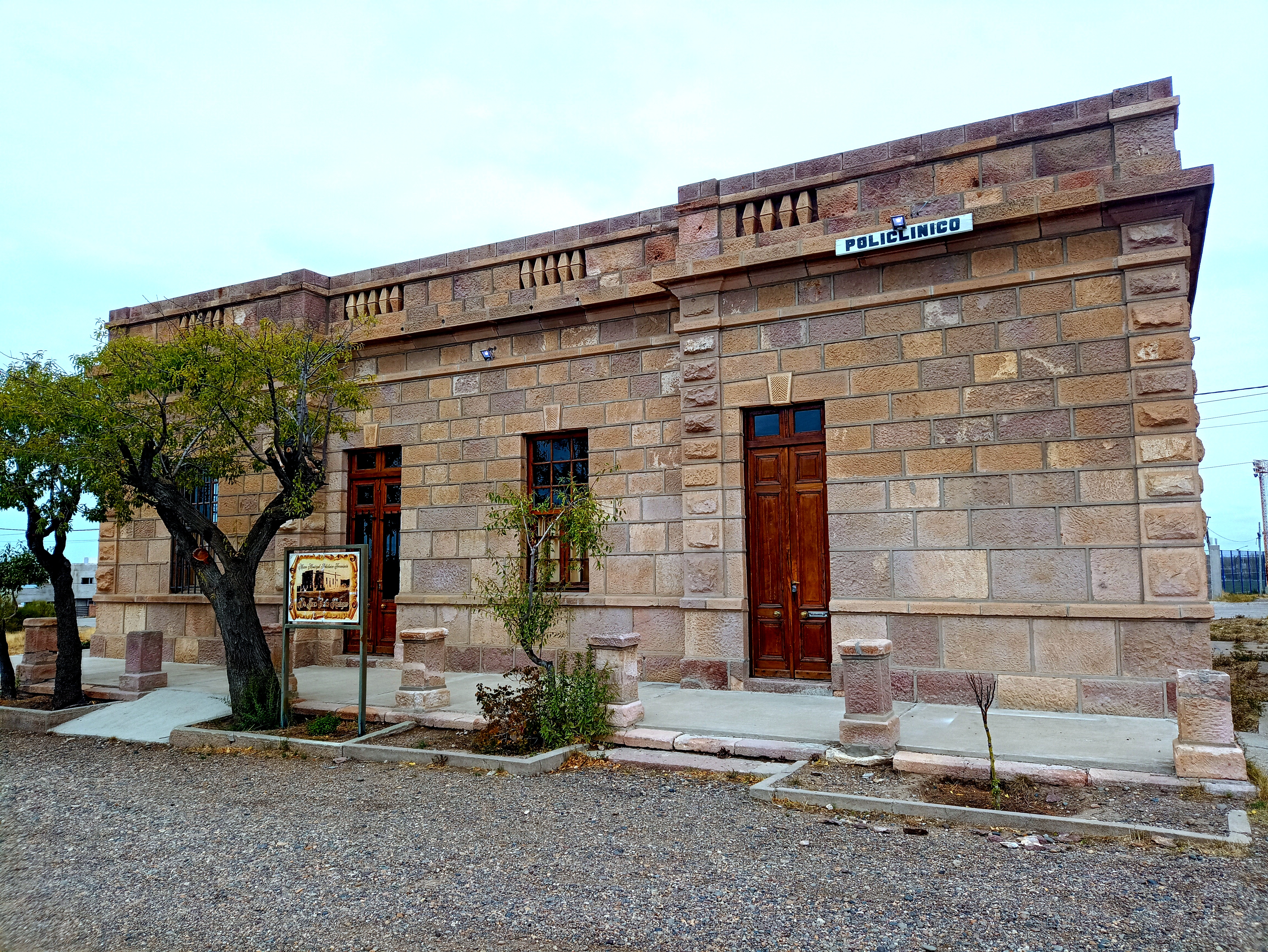
Policlínico, 2025

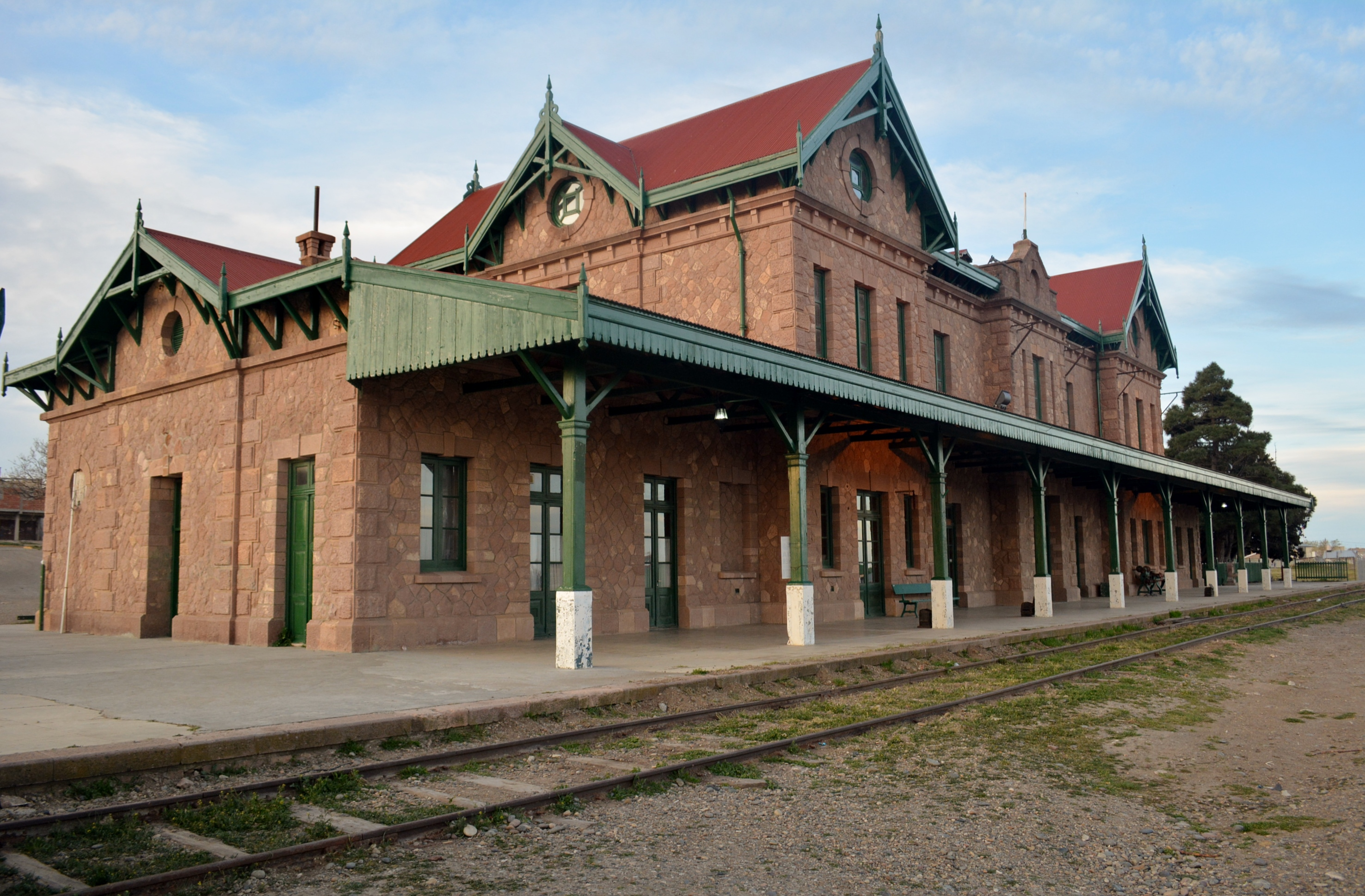
Puerto Deseado, 2015

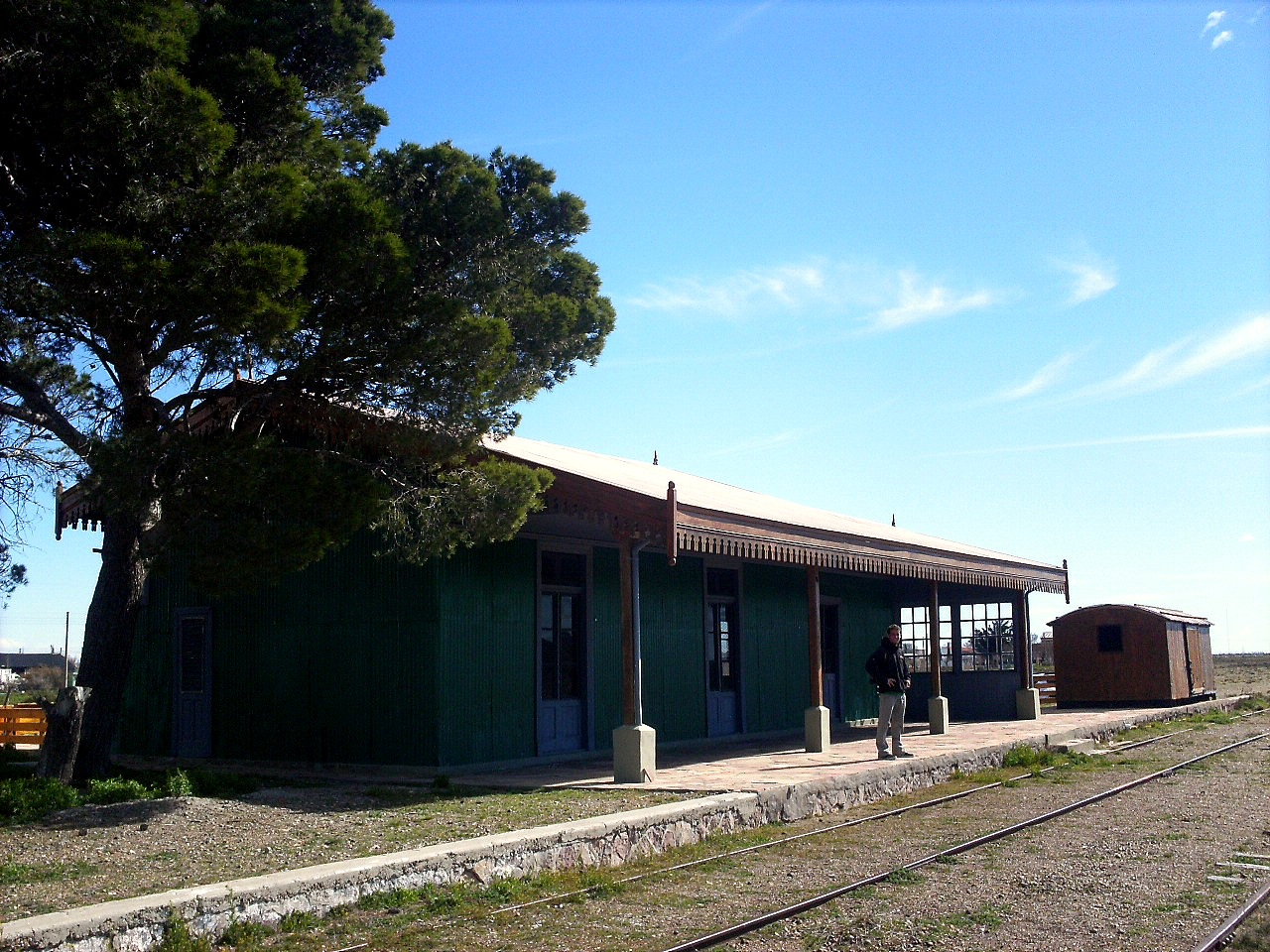
Jaramillo, 2014

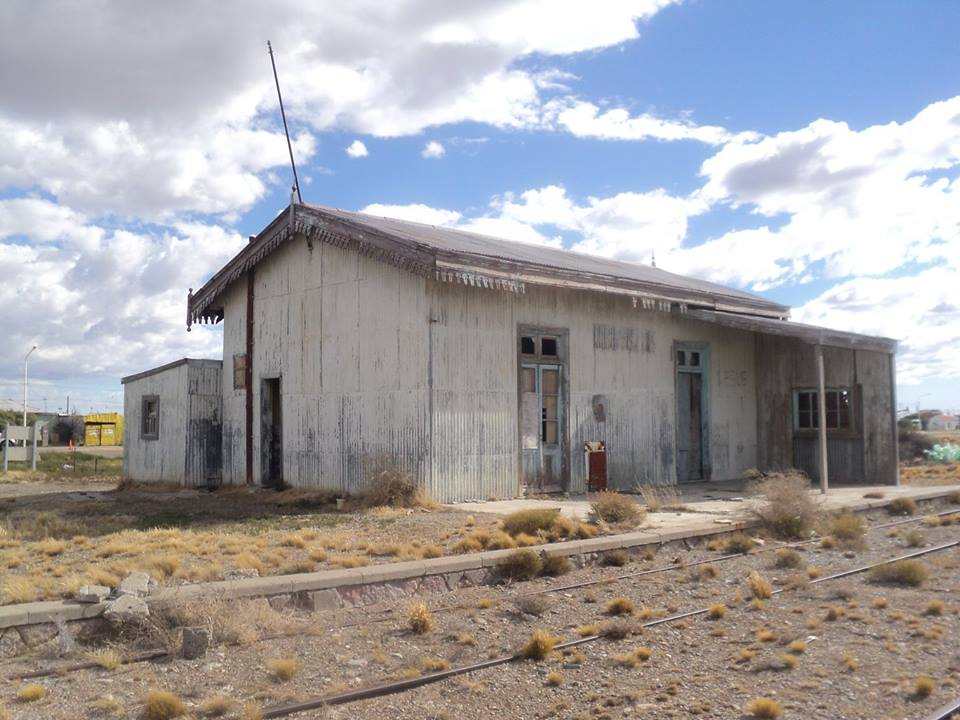
Koluel Kayke, 2014

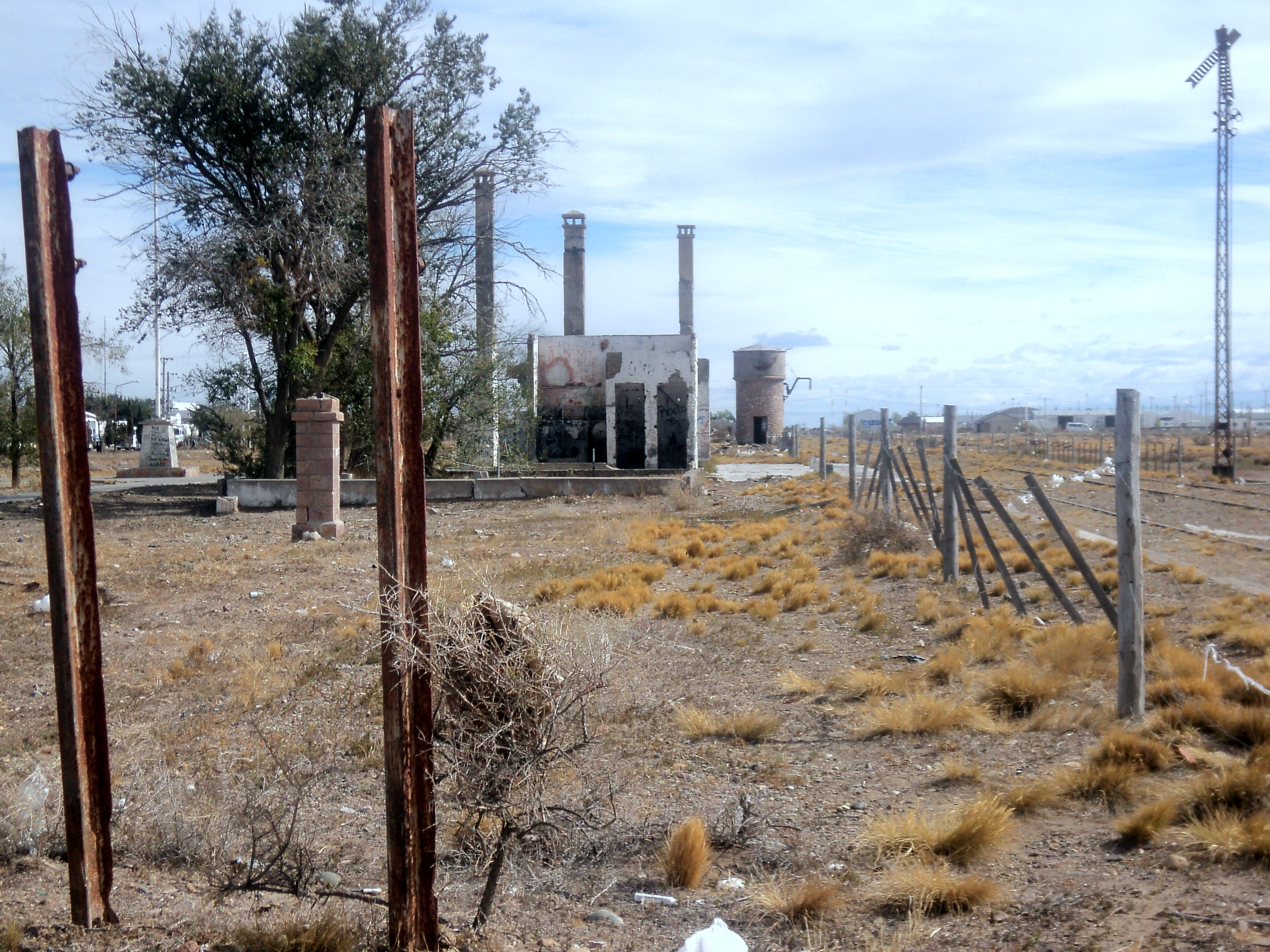
Pico Truncado ruins

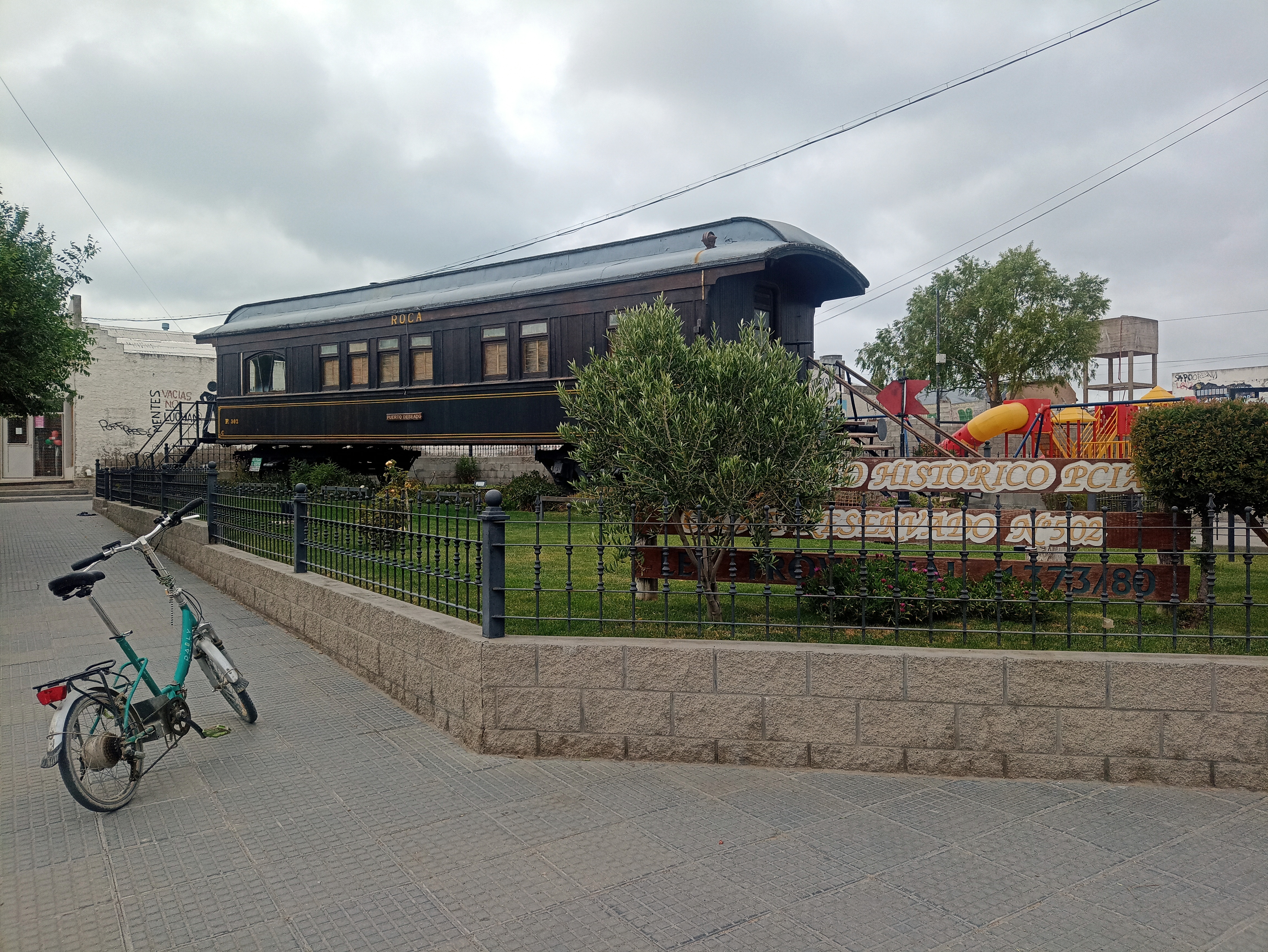
Luxury wagon, 2025

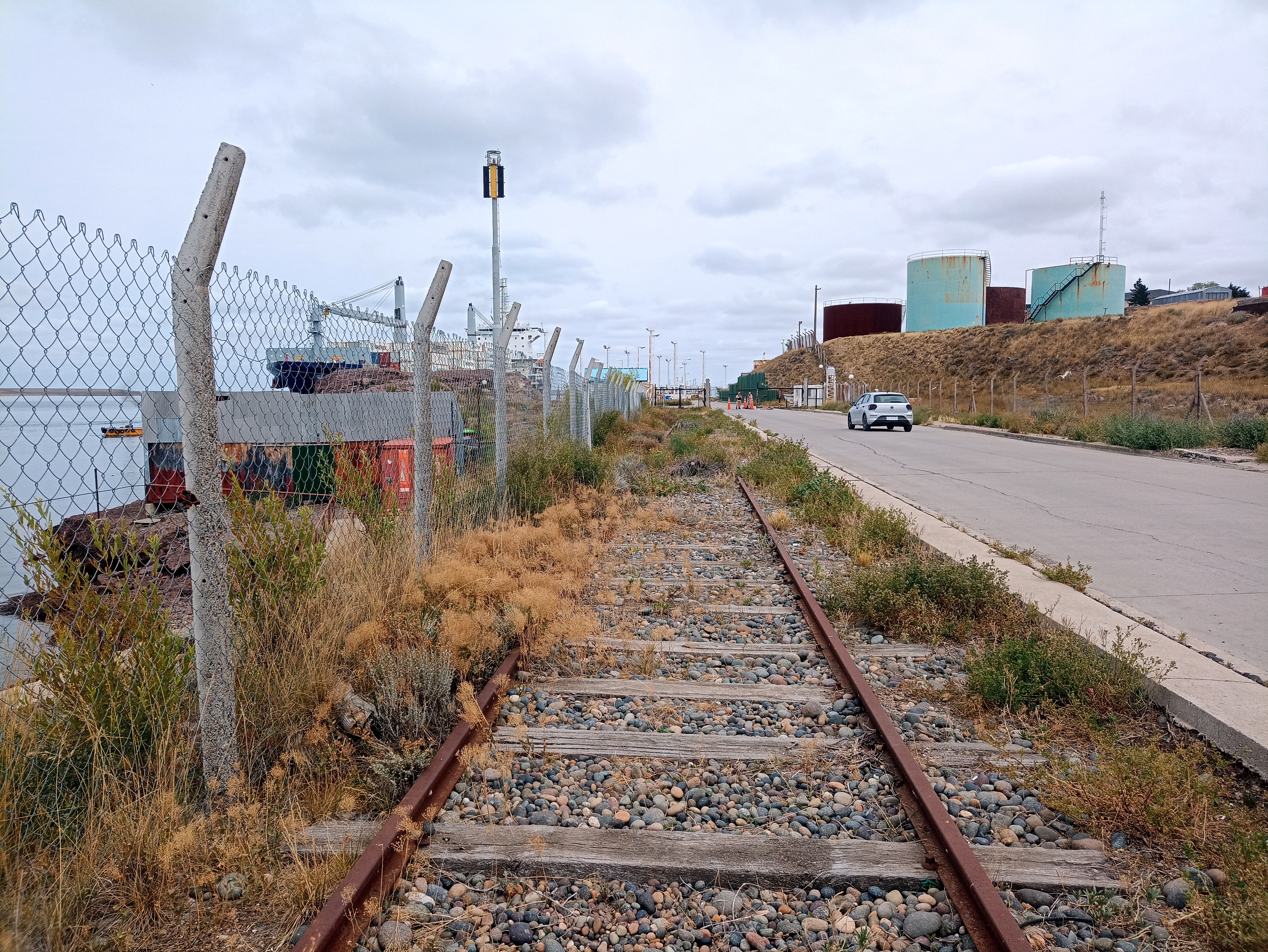
Branch to port, 2025

=== Reopening projects ===
Since the closure of the line in 1978, there have been several projects to re-open the line, with unsuccessful results. One of them was introduced in 1996 by Chubut congressmen for the construction of the "Ferrocarril Transpatagónico". The railway line would join San Antonio Oeste in Río Negro with Río Gallegos in Santa Cruz, including the construction of a bridge between Punta Loyola and La Misión in Tierra del Fuego. The project also included the reopening of Ferrocarril Puerto Deseado-Colonia Las Heras and the Central Chubut Railway. The project was eventually dismissed.

While the railway privatisation in Argentina of 1992 was being carried out, the Argentine Railway Institute, a non-profit organisation, offered to reactivate lines in the country. Santa Cruz Province accepted the invitation, proposing to create a railway between Puerto Deseado and Puerto Chacabuco. Nevertheless, negotiations did not prosper and the railway would not be put into service.

In 2007 the National Government made a call for tenders and finally concessions for the refurbishment were given to UTE (formed by companies Herso-Sonis). Works began in November 2010.

In January 2013, the reopening of the line was officialised but only for the Puerto Deseado-Tellier section (20-km length), which would be completely rebuilt using 40,000 mt. of profiles and 10,000 mt of wooden sleepers.

Some works were carried out to reactivate the line, such as rail tracks weeding, with the collaboration of 20 engineering students from Pontifical Catholic University of Argentina ("Universidad Católica Argentina" - UCA) and the acquisition of a draisine in 2013. By August 2014, tracks had been weeded until Pico Truncado.

The UCA students also work on a tourist train project, named "Tren Deseado". State-owned company Ferrobaires donated them two post wagons and a locomotive to be restored. The train would run an 8 km path at a very low speed, with 6 intermediate stops and the possibility of visiting some points of interest in the zone.

In October, 2015, the Government of Argentina announced the reoponeing of the Puerto Deseado–Colonia Las Heras line. Works will include a widespread renovation of 285-km length rail tracks and sleepers. The station buildings would be also refurbished to put the line into operative conditions in an estimated time of 90 days, according to what the Ministry of Interior and Transport stated. Nevertheless, works were never carried out.
