= Argentine State Railway =

Former Argentinian railway company

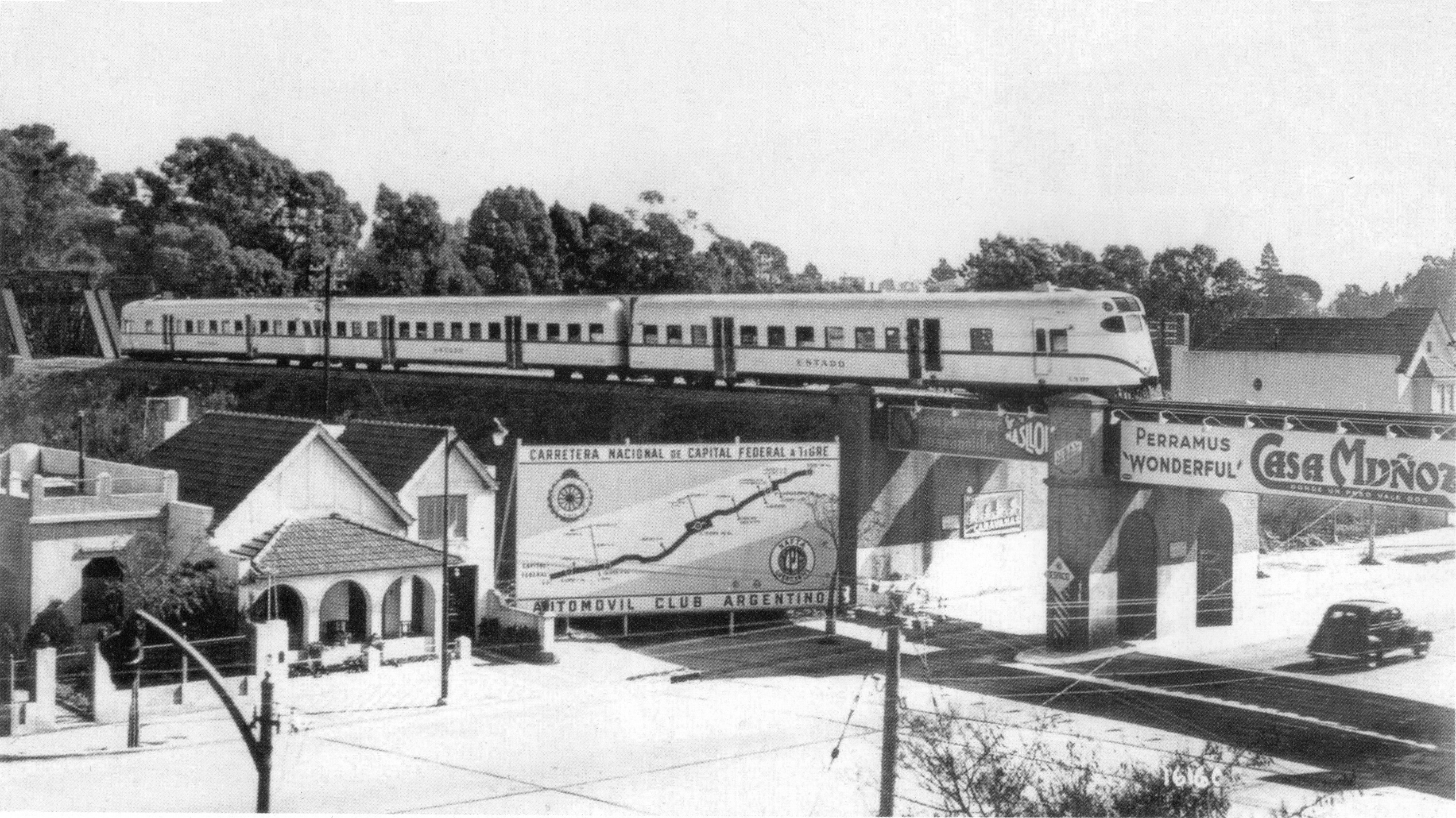
- A Ganz Mávag train unit crossing Av. del Libertador in Vicente López.
- Native name: Ferrocarriles del Estado
- Company type: State-owned
- Industry: Railway
- Founded: 1909
- Defunct: 1948; 78 years ago
- Successor: Ferrocarriles Argentinos
- Headquarters: Santa Fe, Argentina
- Key people: Pablo Nogués (Director)
- Services: Rail transport
- Owner: Government of Argentina

Argentine State Railway (in Spanish: Ferrocarriles del Estado) was a State-owned railway company of Argentina, established by Law N° 6.757 in October 1909, when José Figueroa Alcorta was the President of Argentina. The company built and operated railway lines in Argentina.

== History ==
By 1905 the State-owned railway network was 3,490 km length, with the Ferrocarril Central Norte (FCN) being the longest with 1,385 km and the Ferrocarril Argentino del Norte (FAN) with 563 km. Five years later, FCN was 2,135 km long and FAN 1,355 km.

In 1925, the Argentine State Railway ranked 2nd among the most important companies in the country, operating a railway network of 6,617 km. By 1936 the railway network had been extended to 9,690 km.

Most of the railway lines built by the Argentine state were metre gauge because of financial reasons. In 1937 the State company began to acquire some existing companies with the purpose of competing against British railway companies. In 1948 Argentine State Company (along with British and French companies) became part of Ferrocarriles Argentinos after nationalisation of the railway network, headed by then-President Juan Domingo Perón. Therefore, the Central Northern rail lines were added to General Belgrano Railway network while the Patagonian railways became part of General Roca Railway.

== Railway network ==
Argentine State Railway network as of 1936:

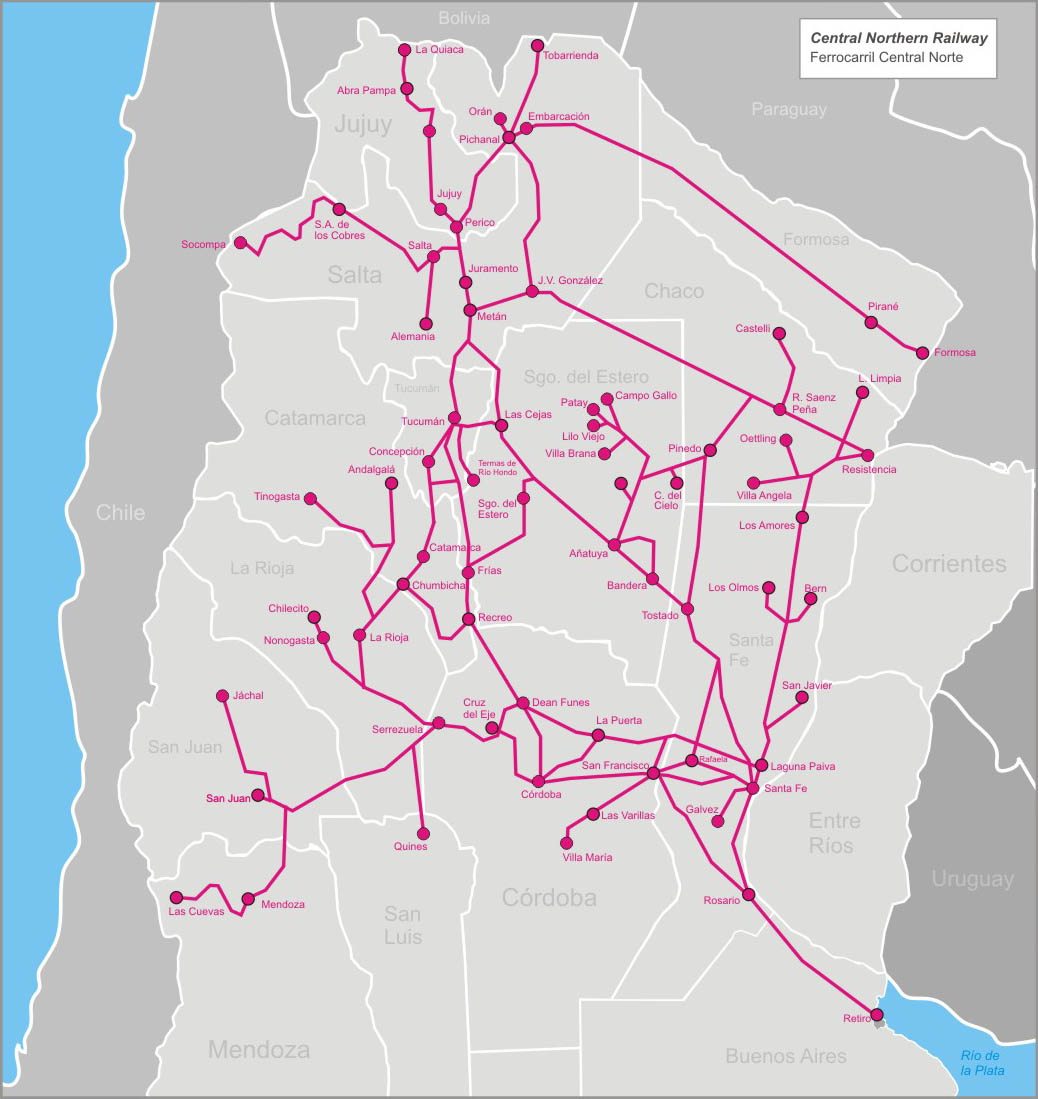
Central Northern network

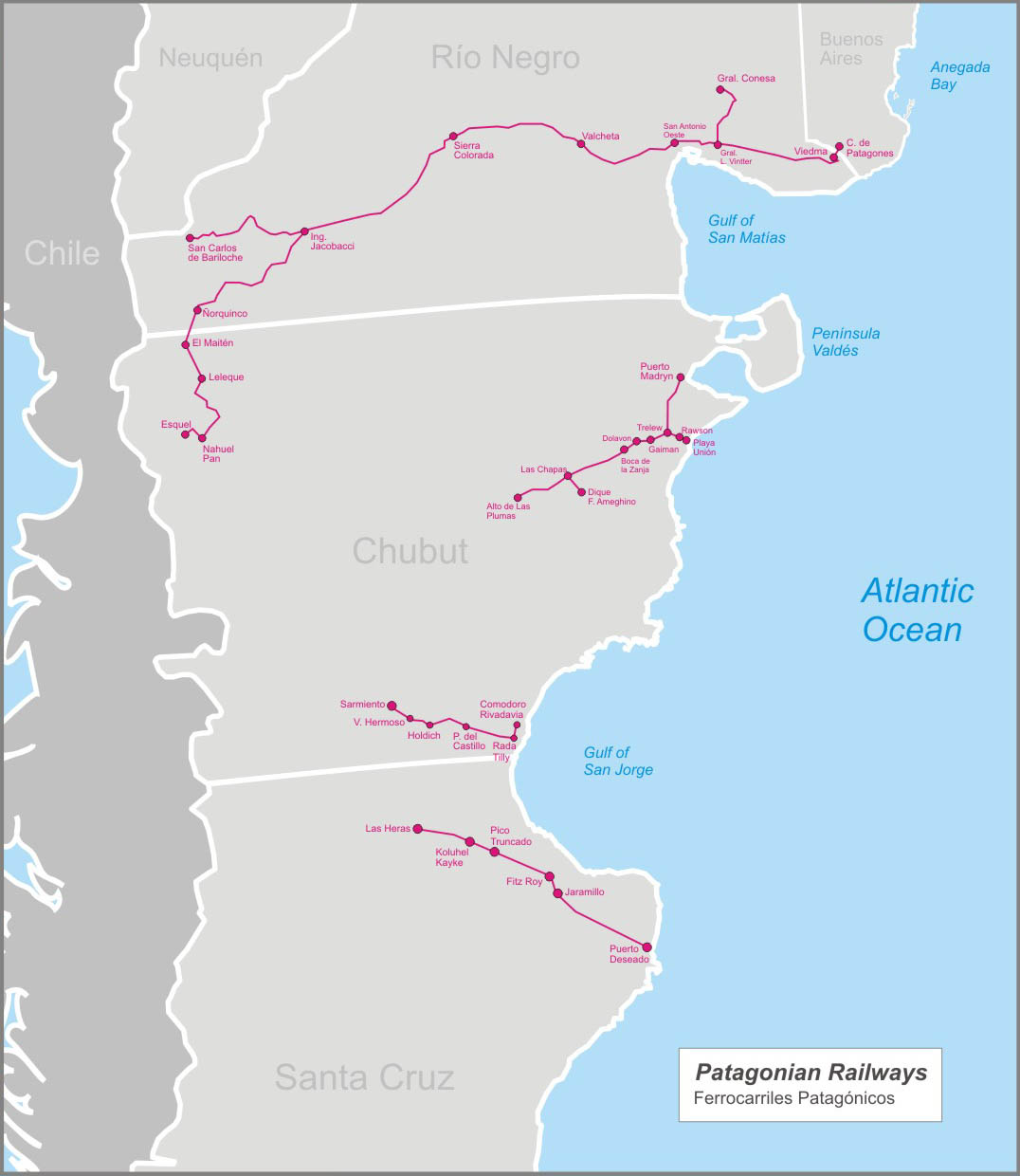
Patagonian rail lines

Main	Division	Province/s	Line/s	Gauge	Length (Km)
Central Northern (Note: The Central Northern had previously taken over North Argentine Railway in 1909.)		La Rioja; Catamarca; Córdoba; Tucumán; Formosa; Chaco; Santiago del Estero; Salta	Córdoba - La Rioja (via Cruz del Eje); Chumbicha - Catamarca; Deán Funes - Laguna Paiva; Córdoba - La Puerta; Serrezuela - San Juan - Formosa - Embarcación; Sáenz Peña - Metán; Tucumán - Santa Fe; Quimilí - Barranqueras	1,000	7,500
Patagónicos	Central Chubut	Chubut	Puerto Madryn - Trelew; Gaiman - Dolavon	1,000	104
Patagónicos	S. Antonio - N. Huapi	Río Negro; Chubut	C. de Patagones - Bariloche; Ing. Jacobacci - Esquel (La Trochita); Gral. Vintter - Gral. Conesa	1,676 0,750	1,316
Patagónicos	Comodoro Rivadavia	Chubut	C. Rivadavia - Colonia Sarmiento	1,676	208
Patagónicos	Puerto Deseado	Chubut, Santa Cruz	Puerto Deseado - Las Heras	1,676	286

== Gallery ==
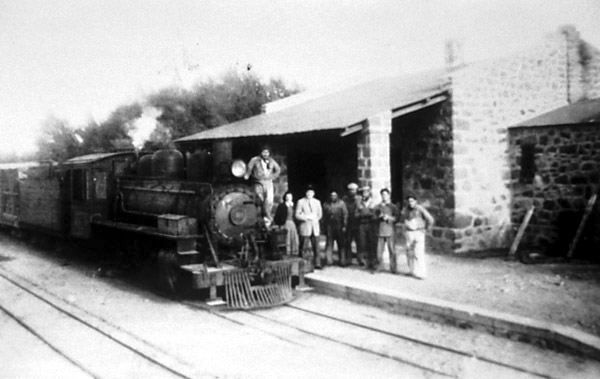
Boca de Zanja station, Chubut

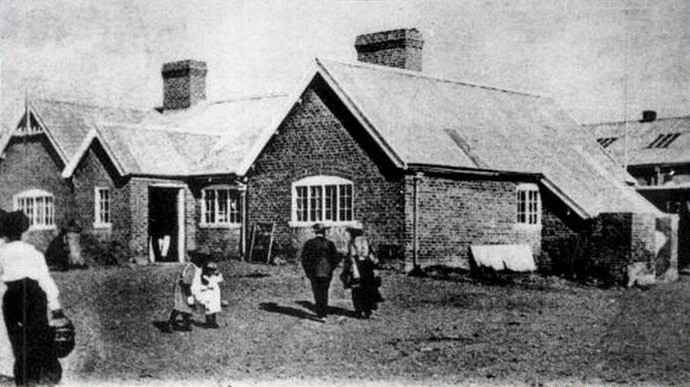
Trelew station, c. 1900.

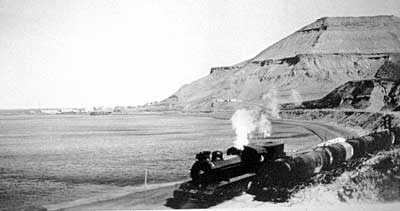
A train arriving km. 3 in Chubut.

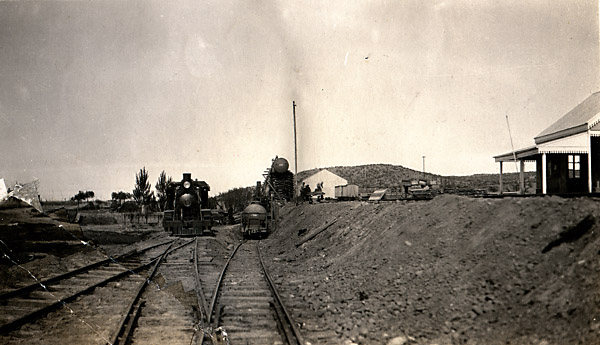
Locomotives in Dolavón.

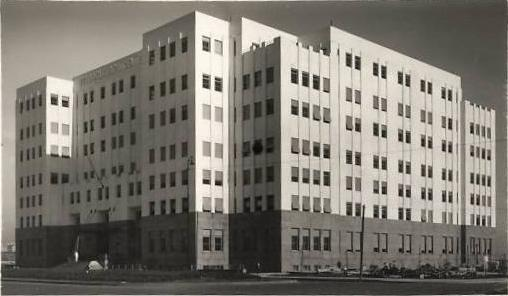
Headquarters in Retiro, Buenos Aires.

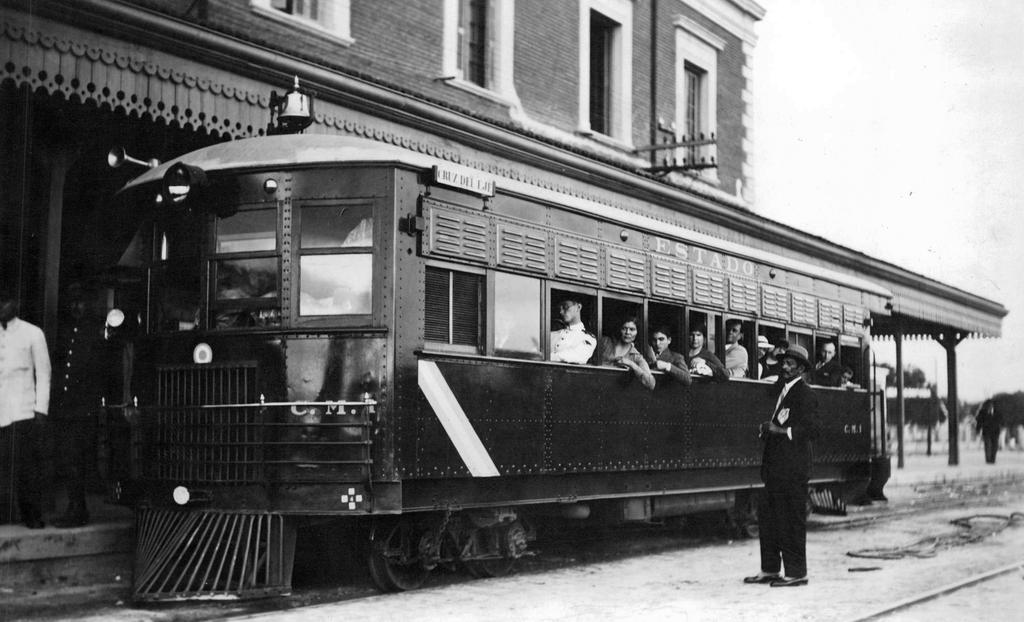
Railcar on the Córdoba - Cruz del Eje line

== Bibliography ==
- Ferrocarriles del Estado on CEPAL Library
- Historia de la Ingeniería Argentina, Centro Argentino de Ingenieros (1981)
