= Colonia Las Heras Airport =

Airport in Argentina

Las Heras Airport Aeropuerto Las Heras
- IATA: LHS; ICAO: SAVH

Summary
- Airport type: Public
- Serves: Las Heras, Argentina
- Elevation AMSL: 1,082 ft / 330 m
- Coordinates: 46°32′19″S 68°57′55″W

Map
- Location of airport in Argentina

Runways
Direction	Length		Surface
Direction	m	ft	Surface
09/27	1,465	4,806	Asphalt
- Source: Landings.com Google Maps SkyVector

Las Heras Airport (Spanish: Aeropuerto Las Heras, IATA: LHS, ICAO: SAVH) is a public use airport serving Las Heras, a town in the oil and gas production region of Santa Cruz Province in Argentina. The airport is at the west edge of the town.

== See also ==
- Transport in Argentina
- List of airports in Argentina
