= Ferrocarriles Patagónicos =

Former Argentine State-owned railway company (1908–1948)

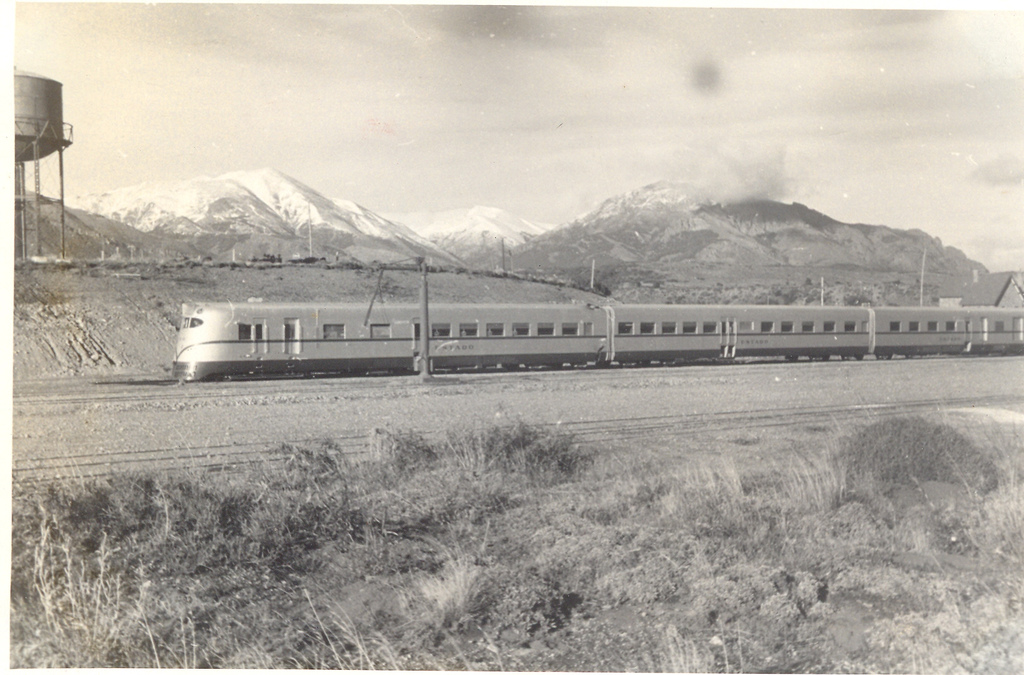
- Railcar by Ganz near Bariloche, 1945.

Overview
- Status: Company defunct; some lines active
- Owner: Argentine State Railway
- Locale: Chubut; Río Negro; Santa Cruz

Service
- Type: Inter-city

History
- Opened: 1908
- Closed: 1948; 77 years ago

Technical
- Track gauge: 750 mm (2 ft 5 1/2 in); 1,000 mm (3 ft 3 3/8 in) metre gauge 1,676 mm (5 ft 6 in)
Route map
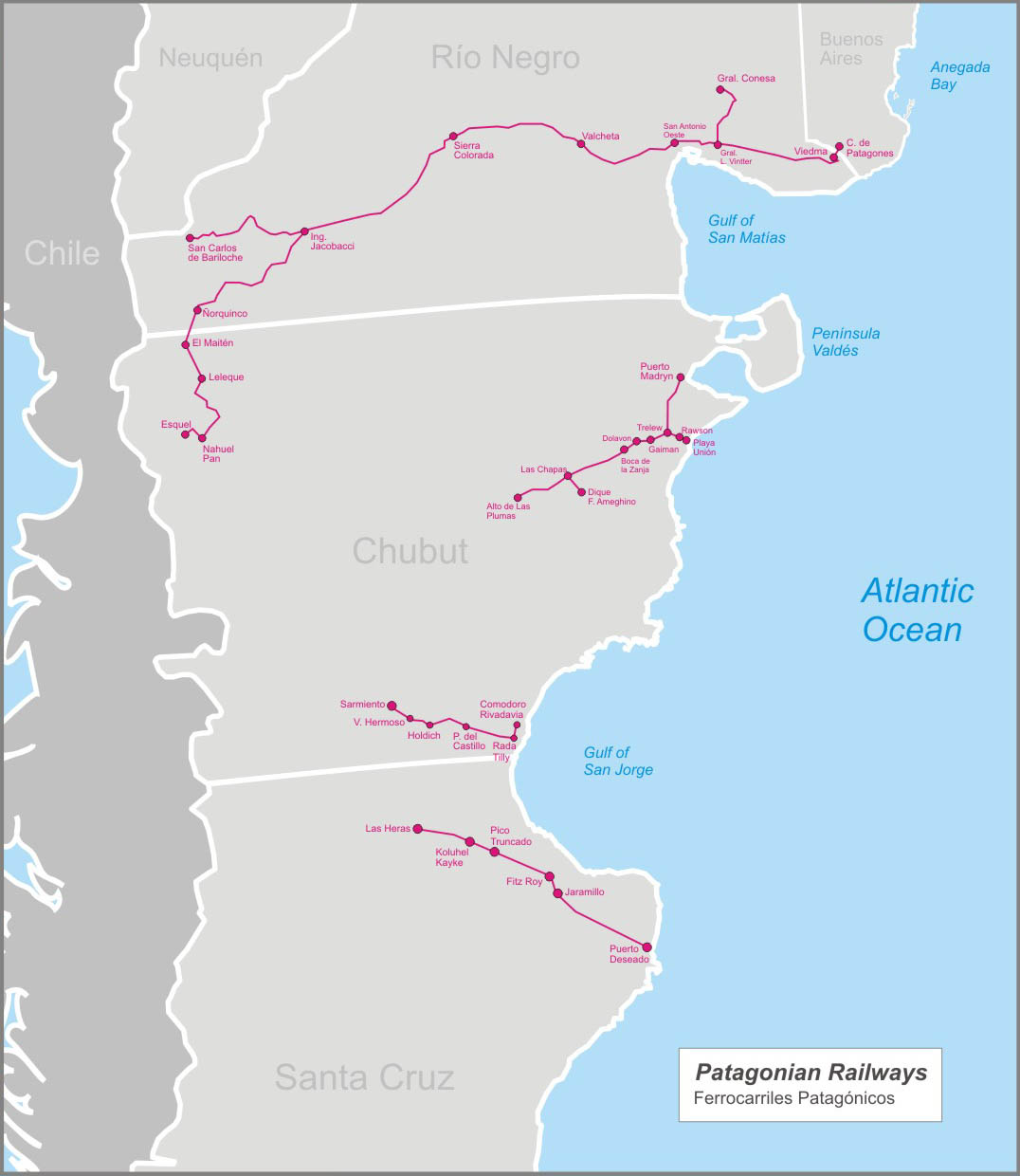

Ferrocarriles Patagónicos was an Argentine State-owned railway company that built and operated several rail lines in Patagonia region. FP were part of the Argentine State Railway created in 1909 during the presidency of José Figueroa Alcorta.

== History ==
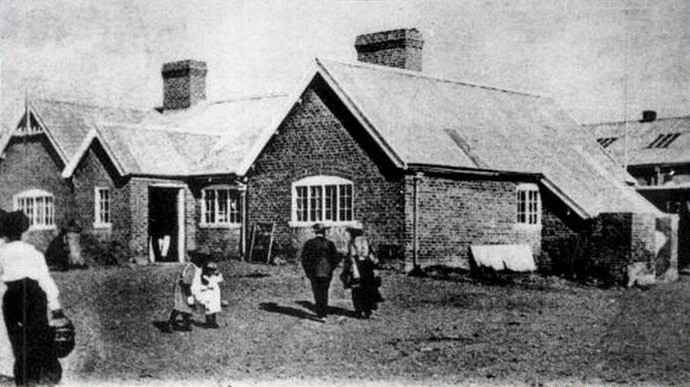
Trelew station, c. 1900

In 1900 two British-owned companies were operating railways in Patagonia; the Central Chubut metre gauge, 1,000 mm (3 ft 3 3/8 in) metre gauge, line between Puerto Madryn and Trelew and the Buenos Aires Great Southern broad gauge line between Bahía Blanca and Neuquén. During the presidency of José Figueroa Alcorta, the Argentine government devised a plan in 1908 to populate Patagonia by constructing two additional broad gauge, 5 ft 6 in (1,676 mm), railway lines in that part of the country. The first line one was to run from San Antonio Oeste, in Rio Negro Territory (later to become Rio Negro Province), via Valcheta to Nahuel Huapi Lake, and the second from Puerto Deseado via Colonia San Martín to a junction with the first line. The second line was to have branches to Comodoro Rivadavia, via Sarmiento, to Colonia 16 de Octubre and to Buenos Aires Lake.

The line from Puerto Deseado, started in 1909, was built only as far as Las Heras, a distance of 283 km (176 mi), and a 197 km (122 mi) line from Comodoro Rivadavia to Sarmiento was completed. These lines came under the administration of Argentine State Railway in 1914. Meanwhile, the line from San Antonio Oeste, started at the end of 1908, reached Km 217 in 1911 and Maquinchao two years later. In 1916 this line also came under the administration of Ferrocarriles del Estado, was extended to Ingeniero Jacobacci in 1917 and to Bariloche in 1934.

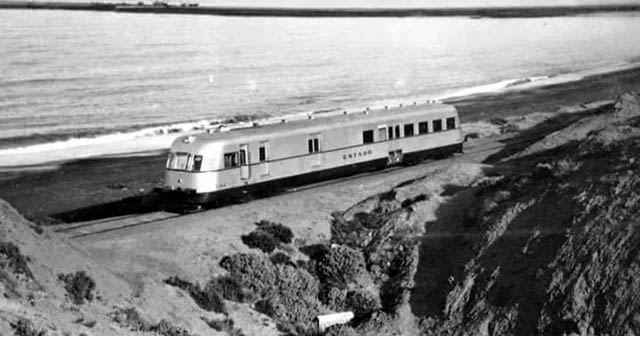
Ganz railcar running on the Comodoro Rivadavia line

When at mid 1930s the road transport became a serious competitor of rail transport, the EFEA acquired some railcars for the Patagonian railways (apart from other lines) to Hungarian company Ganz Works. The units were sent to serve the Carmen de Patagones–Bariloche line. The rolling stock arrived in Argentina in 1938, being operative since December that year.

In 1946 a 402 km (250 mi) long narrow gauge, 750 mm (2 ft 5 1/2 in), branch line was opened from Ingeniero Jacobacci to Esquel in Chubut Province and became known affectionately as La Trochita.

With the railway nationalisation carried out by Juan Perón's administration in 1948, Ferrocarriles Patagónicos network became part of Ferrocarril General Roca.

== Railway network ==
Ferrocarriles Patagónicos network as of 1936:

Ferrocarriles Patagónicos
Company	Province/s	Line/s	Gauge	Total Km
Central Chubut	Chubut	Puerto Madryn – Trelew; Gaiman - Dolavon	0,750	104
San Antonio - Nahuel Huapi	Río Negro; Chubut	C. de Patagones – Bariloche; Ing. Jacobacci – Esquel (La Trochita); Gral. Vintter – Gral. Conesa	1,676; 0,750	1316
Comodoro Rivadavia	Chubut	C. Rivadavia – Colonia Sarmiento; C. Rivadavia – Rada Tilly	1,676	220
Puerto Deseado	Chubut, Santa Cruz	Puerto Deseado – Colonia Las Heras	1,676	286

== See also ==
- Argentine State Railway
- General Roca Railway

== Bibliography ==
British Steam on the Pampas by D.S. Purdom - Mechanical Engineering Publications Ltd, London (1977)
