= North Argentine Railway =

Former Argentinian railway company (1889–1909)

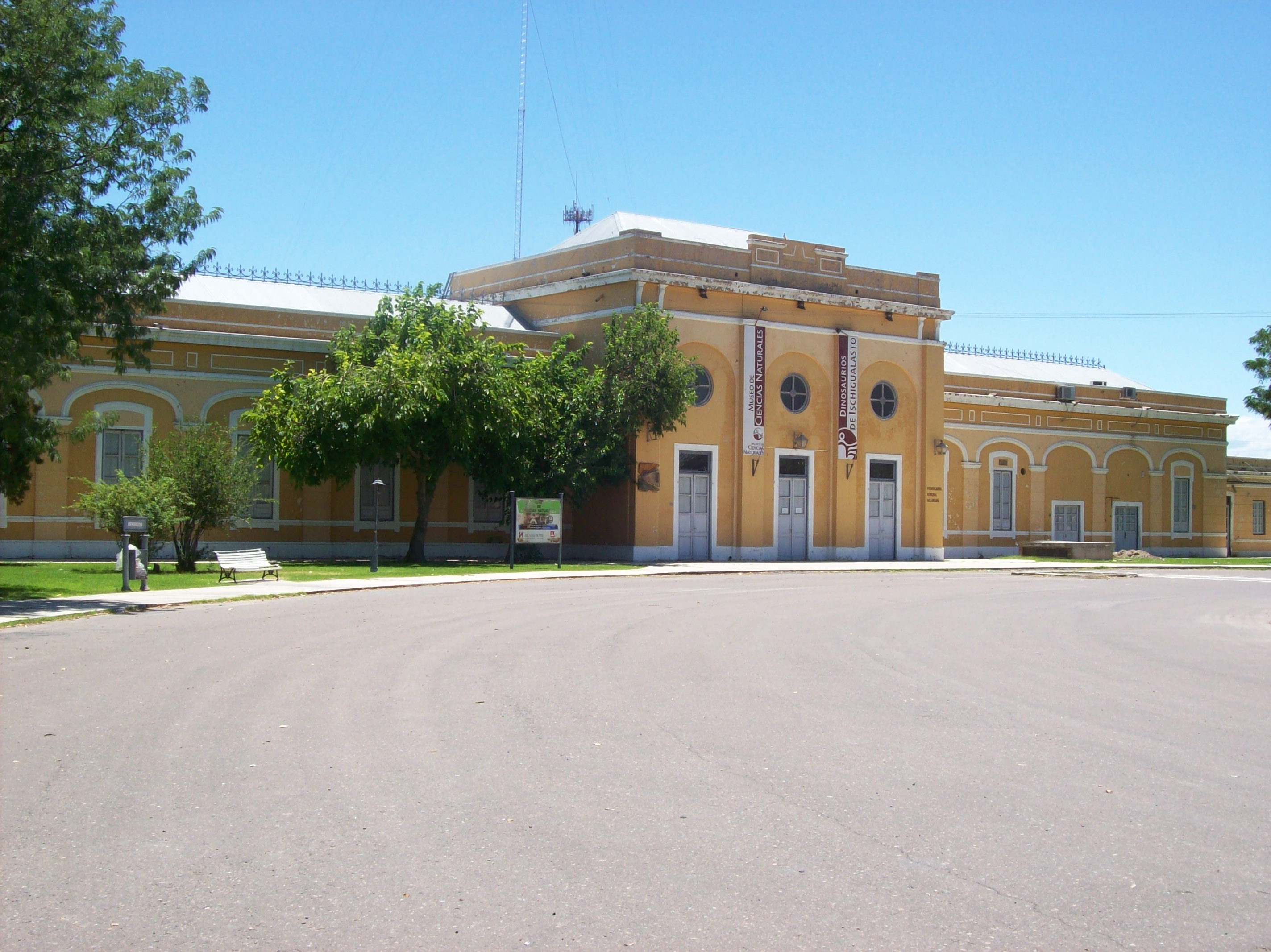
- San Juan train station, former terminus and a museum nowadays.

Overview
- Native name: Ferrocarril Argentino del Norte
- Status: Company defunct; rail lines active
- Owner: Government of Argentina
- Locale: La Rioja; Catamarca; Córdoba

Service
- Type: Inter-city

History
- Opened: 1889
- Closed: 1909; 117 years ago (merged to Central Northern Railway)

Technical
- Line length: 2,539 km (1,578 mi)
- Track gauge: 1,000 mm (3 ft 3 3/8 in) metre gauge
Route map
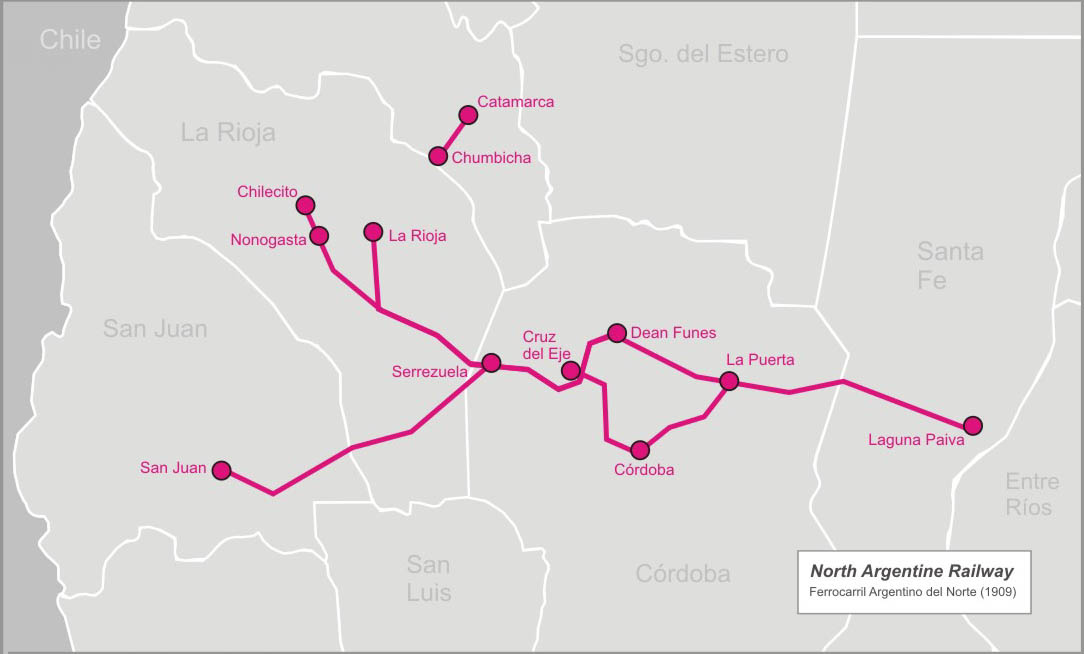

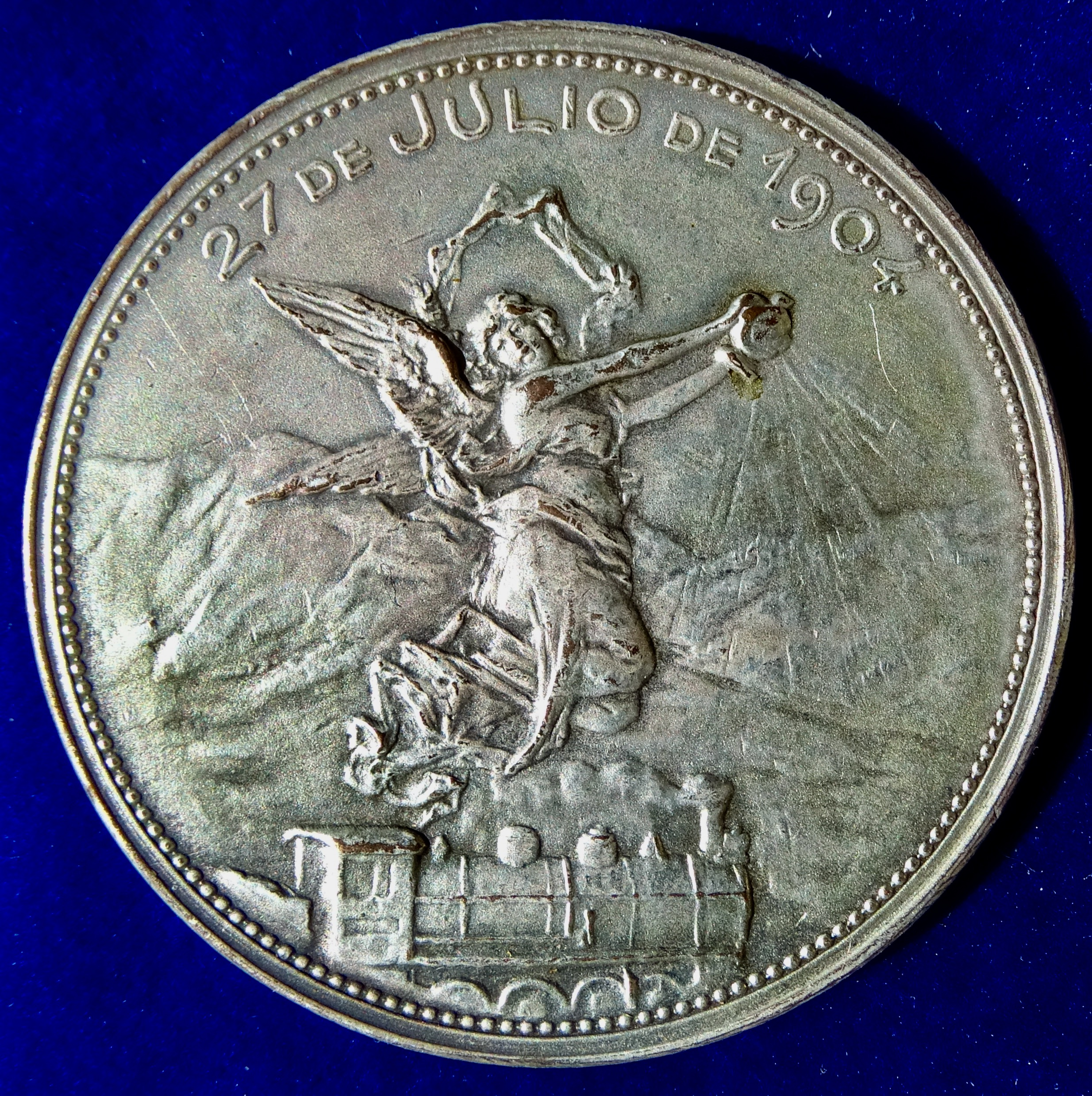
North Argentine Railway Art Nouveau medal for a new Andes lines opening in 1904, obverse

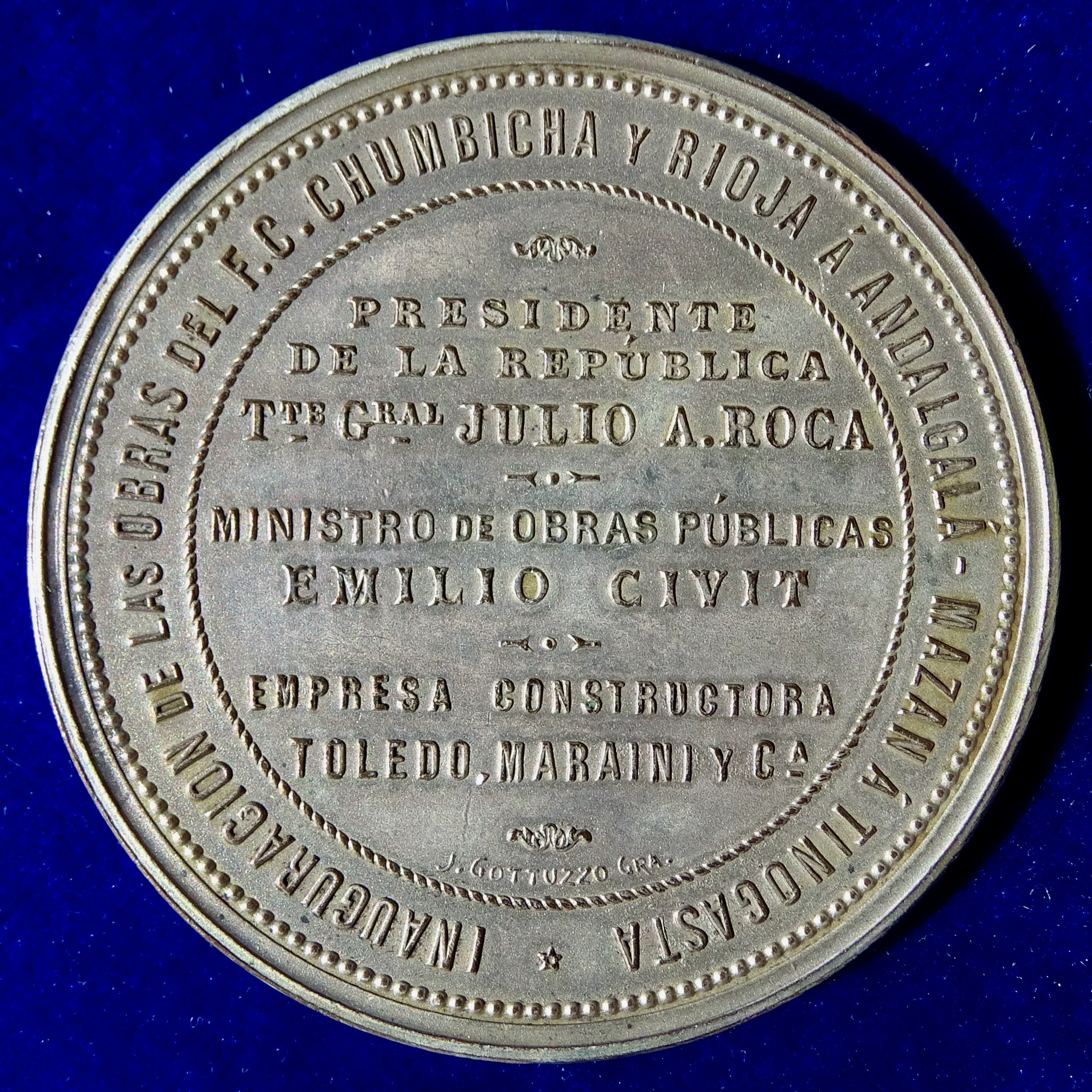
The reverse of this medal

The North Argentine Railway (native name: Ferrocarril Argentino del Norte) was a state-owned railway company that built a 1,000 mm (3 ft 3 3/8 in) metre gauge (metre gauge) railway network in the Argentine provinces of Catamarca and Córdoba which was later merged with the state-owned Ferrocarril Central Norte in 1909.

On 8 June 1889 a line between Chumbicha and Catamarca in Catamarca Province was opened by the state-owned company "Ferrocarril Chumbicha a Catamarca". Another state company, "Ferrocarril Deán Funes a Chilecito", completed a line between Deán Funes and Paso Viejo on 29 March 1890. The line was then extended to Patquia and finally to La Rioja in 1897.

On 1 January 1898 these two railway companies were renamed "North Argentine Railway" (NAR) and on 23 June of the same year the section from Patquia to Chilecito was opened.

On 27 July 1904 the president of Argentina Julio Roca opened the sections into the Andes mountains to Andagala and Tinogasta.

The section from Chumbicha to La Rioja was opened in 1907 and on 11 October 1909, following the creation of the Argentine State Railway ("Ferrocarriles del Estado"), the NAR was merged with the Central Northern Railway.

== See also ==
- Central Northern Railway
- Belgrano Railway
