= Las Heras, Santa Cruz =

Las Heras
- City
- Location of Las Heras in Argentina
- Coordinates: 46°33′S 68°57′W
- Country: Argentina
- Province: Santa Cruz
- Department: Deseado

Government
  - Intendant: José Antonio Carambia (SER Santa Cruz)

Population (2022 census)
  - Total: 24,728
- Time zone: UTC−3 (ART)
- CPA base: Z9017
- Dialing code: +54 297
- Climate: BWk

Las Heras is a small city in the oil and gas production region of Deseado Department of Santa Cruz Province, Argentina. It is located 566 kilometres (352 mi) north of the provincial capital Río Gallegos, and had a population of 24,728 at the 2022 census. The province is in the Patagonia region of Argentina.

Las Heras is served by Las Heras Airport.
