= Ingeniero Jacobacci =

City in Rio Negro Province, Argentina

Coordinates: 41°18′S 69°35′W

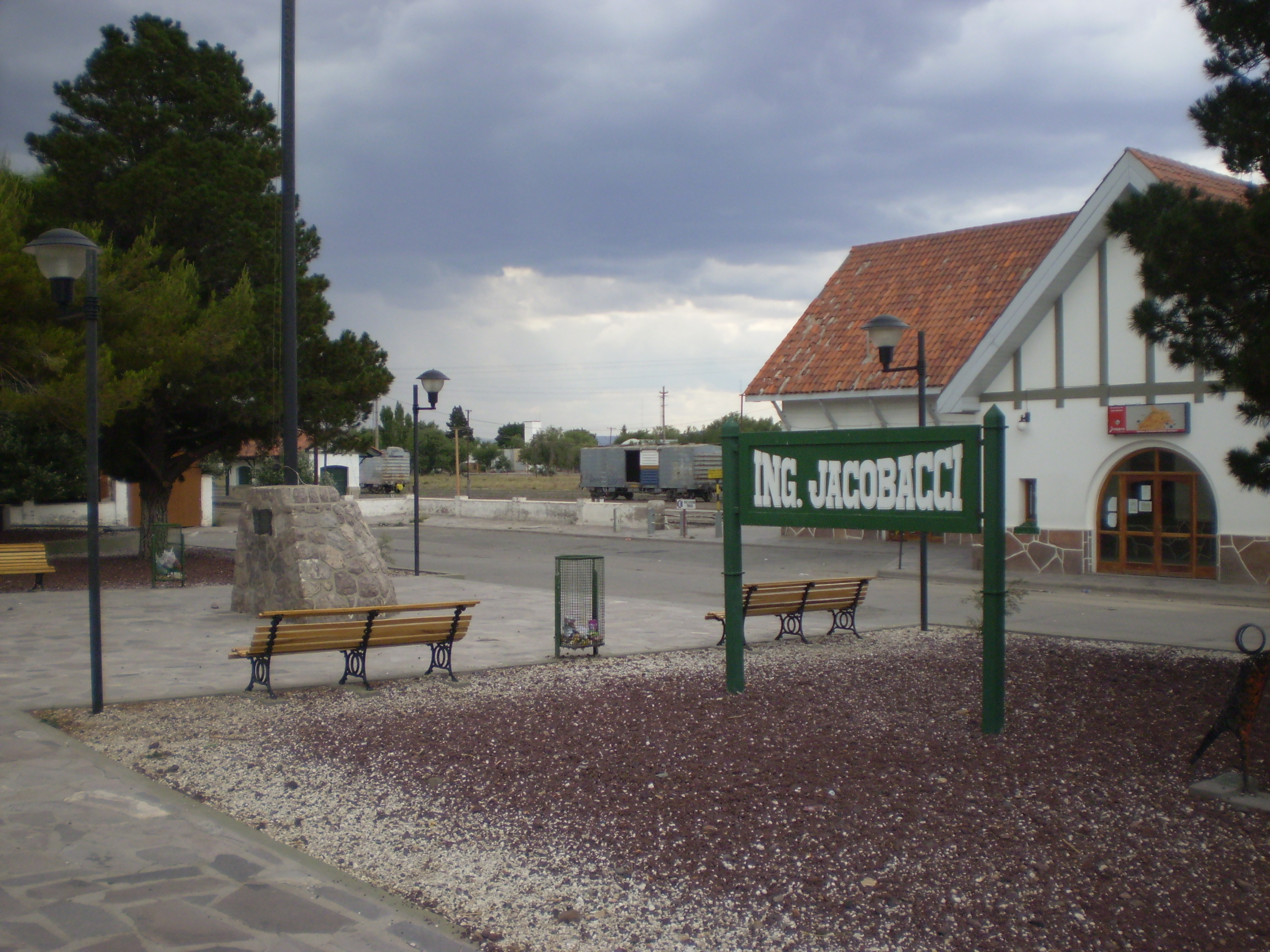
Ingeniero Jacobacci railway station

Ingeniero Jacobacci is a city in Río Negro Province, Argentina. It has a population of 12,000. It is named in honor of Guido Jacobacci, the general director of Ferrocarriles Patagónicos (Patagonian Railways) responsible for the city's rail connection via the Old Patagonian Express in 1916. The line ran between San Antonio Oeste, on the Atlantic Ocean coast, and Bariloche, in the Andes.

A remote outpost in Patagonia, Jacobacci benefited from its proximity to scenic Lake Carri Laufquen (es) and in 1990, an airport was opened to facilitate tourist arrivals in the area. The line to Esquel is no longer in service as the old locomotive does not run anymore.
