= Channel 9 =

Channel 9 or TV 9 may refer to:

== Television networks, channels and stations ==
=== Asia and Pacific ===
==== TV9 Network, India ====
- TV9 Bharatvarsh, a Hindi-language news channel
- TV9 Kannada, a Kannada-language news channel
- TV9 Telugu, a Telugu-language news channel

==== Other countries ====
- Channel 39 (New Zealand), formerly Channel 9, a former regional television station in Dunedin, New Zealand
- Channel 9 (Bangladeshi TV channel), a satellite TV channel from Bangladesh
- CCTV-9, a Chinese television channel
- DZKB-TV, commonly known as Channel 9, the flagship television station of Radio Philippines Network in Manila, Philippines
- DZXL-TV, a defunct television station in Manila, Philippines and the former flagship stations of ABS-CBN
- VTV9, a Vietnamese television channel
- 9MCOT HD, formerly known as Thai TV Channel 4 and Channel 9 M.C.O.T.
- Nine Network, an Australian commercial television network commonly known as Channel 9
- TV9 (Malaysian TV network), a free-to-air private television network in Malaysia
- TV9 Mongolia, a private television station in Mongolia
- TV9 (Samoa), a Samoan television channel

=== Europe, Middle East and Africa ===
- 9Live, a defunct German television channel
- Austria 9, a defunct Austrian television channel
- C9TV, a local television station based in Derry, Northern Ireland, 1999–2012
- Canal 9 (Danish TV channel), a Danish television channel owned by Discovery Networks
- Canal 9 (Norwegian TV channel), a Norwegian television channel owned by TV4 Group and C More Entertainment
- Canal Nou, in the Valencian Community, Spain
- SBS9, a commercial TV channel in the Netherlands
- Channel 9 (Greece), a Greek television channel in the Attica region
- Channel 9 (Israel), an Israeli Russian-language television channel
- Televisão Independente de Moçambique, originally 9TV, a defunct Mozambian television channel
- Kanal 9, a commercial television channel in Sweden
- Kanal 9 (Serbian TV channel), one of three regional television stations in Šumadija and Pomoravlje Region
- TV9 (Algerian TV channel), an Algerian television channel

=== South and Central America ===
- ATV (Peruvian TV channel), formerly Canal 9, in Peru
- Canal 9 (Costa Rican TV channel), a television station in Costa Rica 1994–2000
- Canal 9 (Nicaraguan TV channel), a television channel in Nicaragua
- Canal 9 Litoral
- Channel 9 (Comodoro Rivadavia, Argentina)
- Channel 9 (La Rioja, Argentina), a government television channel in the Provinces of La Rioja and Catamarca, Argentina
- Channel 9 (Resistencia, Argentina)
- Channel 9 (Río Gallegos, Argentina)
- El Nueve or Azul Televisión, a general entertainment television network based in Buenos Aires, Argentina, formerly Canal 9
- El Nueve de Rocha, a television station in Rocha Department, Uruguay
- Sistema Nacional de Televisión (Paraguayan TV channel), formerly Canal 9, in Paraguay
- Telefe Bahía Blanca, a private television channel in Bahía Blanca, Buenos Aires, Argentina
- Tele 9 Corazón, a defunct Colombian television channel

== Other uses ==
- Channel 9 (Microsoft), part of MSDN that publishes videos and podcasts on software development
- Chanel 9, a fictional television channel on the BBC television series The Fast Show

== See also ==
- Citizens band radio channel 9 (27.065 MHz), reserved for emergency and distress calls
- Channel 9 branded TV stations in the United States
- Channel 9 virtual TV stations in Canada
- Channel 9 virtual TV stations in Mexico
- Channel 9 virtual TV stations in the United States
- VHF frequencies covering 186-192 MHz:
  - Channel 9 TV stations in Canada
  - Channel 9 TV stations in Mexico
  - Channel 9 digital TV stations in the United States
  - Channel 9 low-power TV stations in the United States
