= Pico Truncado =

- Municipality and town
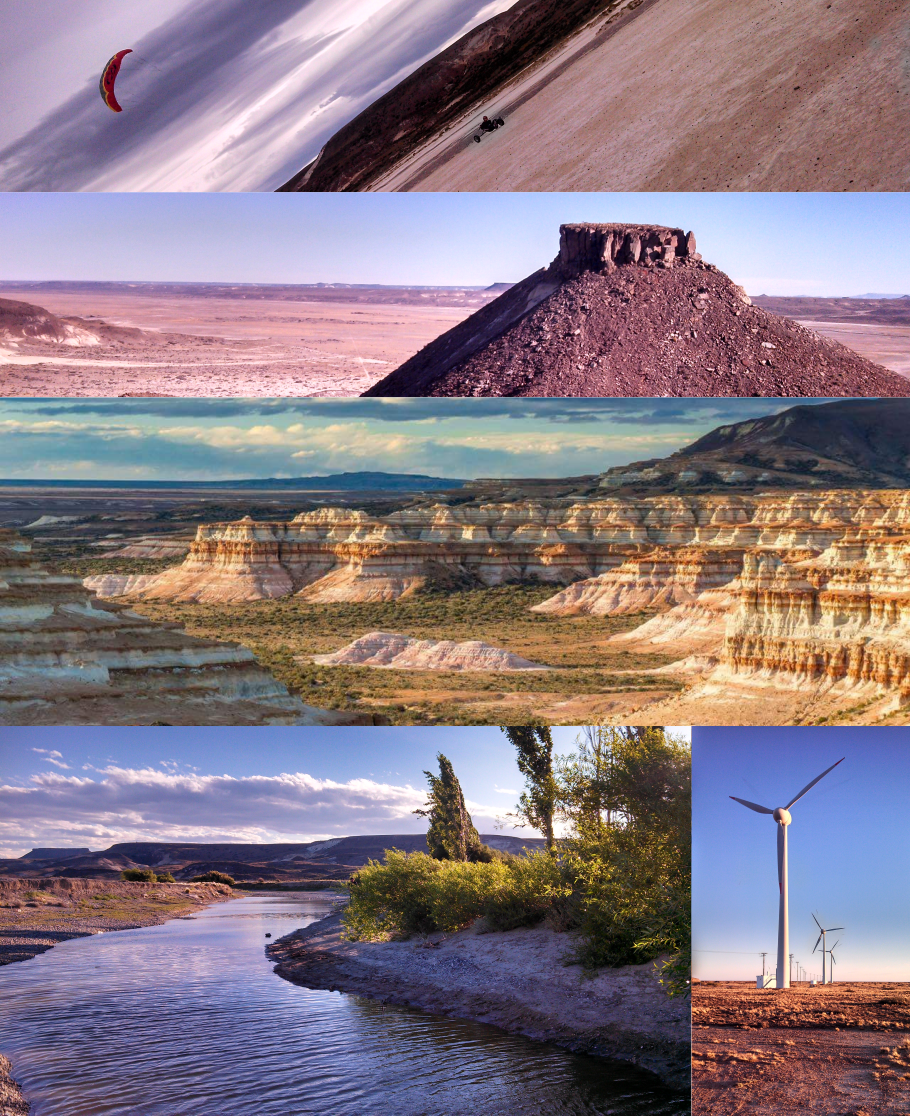

- Location within Argentina
- Coordinates: 46°47′42″S 67°57′18″W
- Country: Argentina
- Province: Santa Cruz
- Department: Deseado Department
- Established: 11 July 1921

Government
  - Intendant: Pablo Anabalon (SER Santa Cruz)

Area
  - Total: 11.44 km^{2} (4.42 sq mi)

Population (2022 census)
  - Total: 25,194
  - Density: 2,202/km^{2} (5,704/sq mi)
- Demonym: Truncadense
- Time zone: UTC−3 (ART)
- Postal code: Z9015

Pico Truncado is a town and municipality in Santa Cruz Province in southern Argentina. In 1921, the village's railway station was the site of one of the few open engagements between the Argentine Army and anarchist strikers at the time of the events known as Patagonia rebelde, where the army suffered its only fatality of the campaign.

== History ==
=== Indigenous people ===
Mentioning the history of the area now occupied by Pico Truncado means going back some 13,000 years. Lithic pieces found in the strata of the different caves explored, have made it possible to determine that the oldest inhabitants of the region were here 13,000 years ago, leaving even today, samples of their culture, cave expressions and the certainty that this place at that date was a place with abundant water and pastures that determined the approach of a large number and variety of species of the time.

In the area there is evidence that 13,000 years ago, Mapuche and Tehuelche communities coexisted, living of hunting guanaco and choiques, fishing, and collecting mapu fruits, enduring strong winds and very cold winters. They left pictorial art in various places. They traveled long distances to find good hunting areas.

When the Spanish conquerors arrived, they ran out of freedom, their economic and geopolitical interests incorporated this territory into the agro-livestock market. When the Conquest of the Desert began, they were forced to live in unfavorable places. Tehuelches and Mapuches merged, mutually absorbing cultural aspects.

=== Patagonian railroad ===
In 1908 President Figueroa Alcorta, through Law No. 5,559, sanctioned the construction of the Patagonian Railroad. It is defined to study, build and operate the railroads:

... From Puerto Deseado to the junction with the previous line that goes to Lake Nahuel Huapi, passing through Colonia San Martín, with a branch to Comodoro Rivadavia, passing through Colonia Sarmiento, another branch to Lake Buenos Aires and another to Colonia 16 de Octubre ...

It was part of an ambitious project that aimed to create a railway that would cross the Argentinean Patagonia towards the northwest and then join the line that connected San Antonio Oeste with Bariloche.

A parallel objective was to encourage the settlement of populations in Patagonia, in this case in Santa Cruz.

The first works related to the measurements for the layout were made between 1908 and 1910, starting the construction in Puerto Deseado in May 1909. The works in charge of Engineer Juan Briano. At the end of 1911, trains began to run to the first point of the rails, Pico Truncado.

The first figures from 1911 showed 1,235 passengers and 1950 tons of cargo. In 1912 the line operated with a conditional public service up to km 202, transporting 2,370 passengers and 4,208 tons of cargo.

Along its route, 14 stations were created, almost all of them located every 20 km, which were named by a decree signed on October 7, 1914.

The construction of this project achieved one of its objectives, that of promoting settlements in Patagonia, allowing the emergence of many localities in the northern area of Santa Cruz.

November 25, 1911 appears as the date of arrival of the rails at "Km 200", the name by which Pico Truncado would be known for a long time, given that this is the distance that separates the station from the headwaters located in Puerto Deseado. The official inauguration took place on 31 December 1913, when the railroad began operations.

In 1915, when the importance of Caleta Olivia decreased, the population became a center of attraction, establishing families of merchants and ranchers, agricultural and railway workers, reaching such a point of growth, that in 1917 the public offices of Caleta Olivia were moved to Pico Truncado. At that time there were already 200 inhabitants and as its development was accentuated in 1918, it was decided to carry out the first official layout of the city.

Until the middle of the 20th century, the time of the discovery of oil in Cañadón Seco, Pico Truncado had a small population, with no more than five hundred inhabitants who lived from sheep and cattle farming and from the commercialization of their products through the railway.

Pico Truncado was made official as a town by a founding document, the decree of July 11, 1921 signed by then President Hipólito Yrigoyen.

On January 14, 1978, the branch of the Patagonian Railroad was closed and indefinitely closed on January 1, 1979.

In spite of the State's attempt to make it disappear forever, this means of transport contributed to the development of localities around the railway, consolidated the port action of Puerto Deseado and made Pico Truncado emerge, ensuring the growth of Las Heras and three villages; Fitz Roy, Jaramillo and Koluel Kayke.

=== Oil and Gas ===
From 1946 onward, explorations in search of oil intensified and exploitation began in the northern area of Santa Cruz. In 1950, with the arrival of Sismográfica 22 from the state company YPF, the great change began, the oil production and producing the growth of the city, generating the installation of a great deposit and all the infrastructure of houses that this requires.

The discovery of gas near the city was accidentally made by an inhabitant of Pico Truncado, Don Manuel Caamaño, while he was digging a well for water.

In the 1960s, the importance of the installation of the State Gas Plant led to the town being known as "Pico Truncado, Capital del Gas".

The Gas Pipeline Pico Truncado-Buenos Aires was opened on March 5, 1965, also the fluid treatment plant, which brought a new quota of growth to the city.

=== New technologies ===
Pico Truncado is one of the cities with the highest average annual wind speed and persistence in the world. This strategically positions it as a base for the development of the renewable energy industry. One of them is hydrogen.

The Hydrogen Experimental Plant, the only one of its kind in Latin America, aims at the production, research, development, dissemination and training on the uses of hydrogen as a fuel.

In 2004, the project received scientific support from the United Nations. In 2005, it was inaugurated. In 2007, the National Congress passed Law No. 26,123 on the Promotion of Hydrogen. In 2014, the Senate and the Chamber of Deputies sanctioned the law that declares Pico Truncado as the "National Hydrogen Capital".

An important achievement of this project was to have placed the first clean energy module in the Esperanza Base, which consists of an electrolyzer, a wind turbine, a generator and a kitchen, transformed to work with hydrogen. From this, Argentina became the first country in the world to use renewable energies in Antarctica.

The plant operates using the electricity generated by the Jorge Romanutti Wind Farm, inaugurated in 1995.

Wind energy is obtained by taking advantage of the kinetic energy of moving air masses. The park has four E-44 type wind turbines with a power of 2.4 MW. The average annual wind speed is 10.3 m/s, making it one of the most average wind farms in the country.

The system requires virtually no maintenance, the investment makes it economically profitable and produces pollution-free energy.

== Climate ==
Pico Truncado has a cold desert climate (Köppen climate classification BWk) with warm summers and cold winters. Precipitation is sparse, averaging 162 mm a year.

Climate data for Pico Truncado
Month	Jan	Feb	Mar	Apr	May	Jun	Jul	Aug	Sep	Oct	Nov	Dec	Year
Daily mean °C (°F)	17.1 (62.8)	16.6 (61.9)	14.3 (57.7)	11.1 (52.0)	7.2 (45.0)	4.3 (39.7)	4.1 (39.4)	5.7 (42.3)	8.2 (46.8)	11.1 (52.0)	14.1 (57.4)	16.0 (60.8)	10.8 (51.4)
Average precipitation mm (inches)	10.8 (0.43)	12.5 (0.49)	15.9 (0.63)	15.5 (0.61)	20.1 (0.79)	18.4 (0.72)	17.9 (0.70)	15.6 (0.61)	8.1 (0.32)	8.9 (0.35)	9.0 (0.35)	9.6 (0.38)	161.9 (6.37)
Average precipitation days	3.7	3.6	3.6	4.7	5.8	5.4	5.1	5.3	4.1	4.1	3.8	5.1	54.3
Average relative humidity (%)	42.6	44.2	48.2	53.4	62.2	65.8	64.8	59.6	53.1	47.1	42.8	41.2	52.1
Percentage possible sunshine	49.7	53.6	48.8	45.5	42.8	41.3	42.4	45.7	47.1	49.9	50.3	48.3	47.1
Source: Weatherbase

== Sport ==
For more than 30 years, basketball has been one of the most popular sports. Proof of this was La Garra Celeste. This was the nickname of the basketball team that played in the national B tournament. After several years and transitions it became the Club Escuela de Básquet de Pico Truncado, La Escuelita. The city has two teams affiliated to the Federal Council called Defensores de Truncado and 13 de Diciembre, which plays in the Santa Cruz North Soccer League at the Caleta Olivia venue. It also has the Neighborhood League where teams made up of local citizens compete.

A predominant natural characteristic in the town is the wind, this resource is used for kitebuggy sports.
