= Channel 9 (Río Gallegos, Argentina) =

LU 85 TV Canal 9
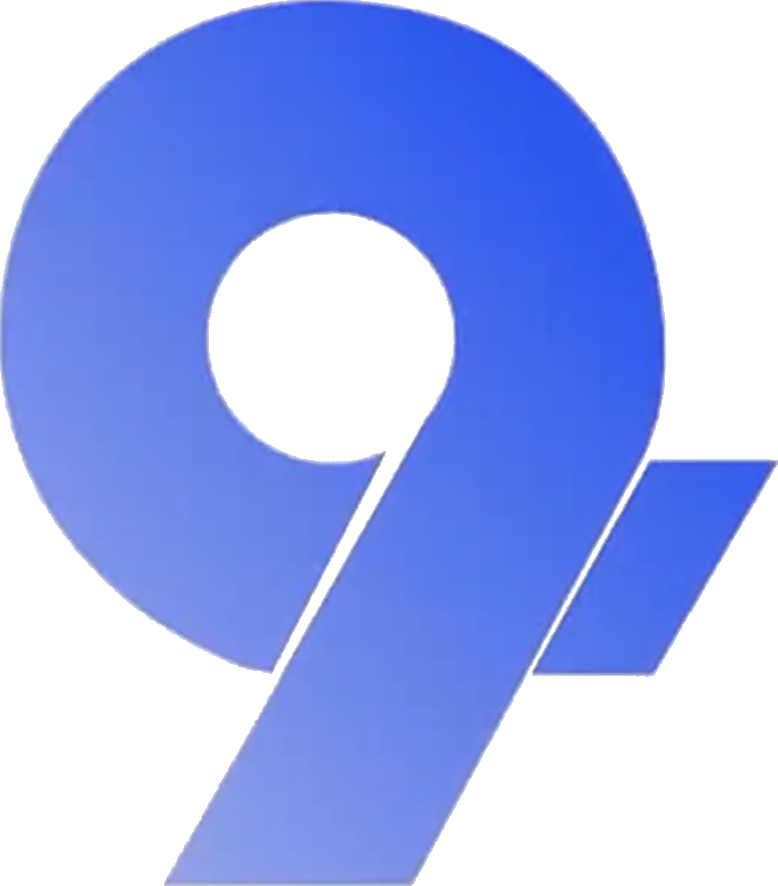
- Río Gallegos, Santa Cruz; Argentina
- Channels: Analog: 9 (VHF); Digital: 30 (UHF)
- Branding: Canal 9 CDT

Programming
- Affiliations: Encuentro; Pakapaka

Ownership
- Owner: Government of Santa Cruz Province

History
- First air date: May 25, 1968

Technical information
- Licensing authority: ENACOM

Canal 9 de Río Gallegos, also known as Cruceña de Televisión or CDT, is a television station licensed to Río Gallegos, Santa Cruz, Argentina, owned by the provincial government.

== History ==
On May 23, 1963, through Decree 2878 (published on May 30, 1968), the National Executive Branch awarded the provincial government a license to exploit the frequency of Channel 9 of the city of Río Gallegos, capital of the Santa Cruz Province.

The license started regular broadcasts on May 25, 1968 as LU 85 TV Canal 9 de Río Gallegos.

That same year, through Provincial Decree 1490, it was already awarded the launch of the license like what happened 5 years ago.

21 years later, on September 28, 1989, the provincial legislature approved Law 2136 in which it was granted a legal and functional status.

On April 4, 1990, through Decree 644, the National Executive Branch authorized the provincial territory to provide an over-the-air television service to Canal 9.

On December 30, 2008, the Federal Broadcasting Committee, through Resolution 1481, authorized Canal 9 to install a repeater in Puerto San Julián on VHF channel 8.

On June 24, 2011, AFSCA, through Resolution 689, granted the station UHF channel 30 to conduct digital broadcasts.

In August 2016, the public stations of Patagonia (including Canal 9) created "Red Patagónica de la Televisión Pública" with the aim of allowing viewers to access a regional Patagonian news program with current political, economic, sports, cultural and tourist information.

In September 2017, it was announced that the station would operate from a new studio at Bernardino Rivadavia 750 Street.

On November 8, 2021, Canal 9 added digital transmitters on channels 23.3 (Río Turbio) and 30.2 (Río Gallegos). On March 28, 2022, digital signals for Caleta Olivia began on channel 30.1.

On June 29, 2023, the station shut down its analog signal as part of the closure of analog stations in Argentine Patagonia, according to ENACOM Decree nº. 156/2022.

== Programming ==
Part of the line-up consists of relays of Encuentro and Pakapaka, owned by Contenidos Públicos.

Local programming includes 9 Noticias, La ventana del 9 (morning magazine), Entretiempo (sports program), Como en casa (musical program) and Pilchas gauchas (general interest) among others.

== 9 Noticias ==
9 Noticias is its news service which airs on weekdays with three editions (at 8:00, at 12:30 and at 20:00).

Its items are also seen across Patagonia on Resumen Patagónico de Noticias since September 17, 2016.

== Relayers ==
Canal 9 has 22 relay stations throughout the province.

Provincia de Santa Cruz
Channel	Location
8	28 de Noviembre
9	Bajo Caracoles
7	Caleta Olivia
9	Cañadón Seco
9	Comandante Luis Piedrabuena
11	El Calafate
9	El Chaltén
11	Fitz Roy
7	Gobernador Gregores
9	Jaramillo
9	Koluel Kaike
9	Lago Posadas
5	Las Heras
13	Los Antiguos
9	Perito Moreno
4	Pico Truncado
5	Puerto Deseado
6	Puerto Santa Cruz
9	Punta Bandera
8	Río Turbio
9	Tellier
9	Tres Lagos
