= Guy Williams (actor) =

American actor (1924–1989)

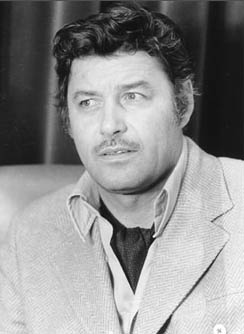
- Williams at his arrival in Argentina, April 1973
- Born: Armando Joseph Catalano; January 14, 1924; New York City, United States
- Died: April 30, 1989 (aged 65); Buenos Aires, Argentina
- Occupation: Actor
- Years active: 1947–1973
- Spouse: Janice Cooper (m. 1948; div. 1983)
- Children: 2

Armando Joseph Catalano (January 14, 1924 – April 30, 1989), better known as Guy Williams, was an American actor. He played swashbuckling action heroes in the 1950s and 1960s.

Among his most notable achievements were two TV series: the title role in Zorro (1957-1959), and as the father of the Robinson family on the popular sci-fi series Lost in Space (1965-1968).

During most of the 1970s, Guy Williams frequently visited and worked in television shows in Argentina, where he was most revered. He retired in the early 1980s in Buenos Aires, where he died of a ruptured brain aneurysm in 1989.

== Biography ==
=== Early life ===
Guy Williams was born of Sicilian descent on January 14, 1924, as Armando Joseph Catalano in the Washington Heights area of New York City. His parents were insurance broker Attilio Catalano from Lercara Friddi and Clara (Arcara) Catalano from Messina, and were by then living in poverty. Attilio was the son of a wealthy timber grower in Messina, who had purchased land in New Jersey. Williams grew up in the Little Italy neighborhood of The Bronx.

In Public School 189, Williams stood out in mathematics. Later, he attended George Washington High School, while he occasionally worked at a soda fountain. He then left to attend the Peekskill Military Academy, where he was an enthusiastic student. His interests included American football and chess.

=== First artistic steps ===
Williams wanted to be an actor, spurred by his good looks and 6'3" height. When he decided not to continue studying, his mother, who later became an executive of a foreign film company, was disappointed because it was expected that he would follow in his father's footsteps as an insurance broker.

After working as a welder, cost accountant and aircraft-parts inspector during World War II, Williams became a salesman in the luggage department at Wanamaker's. While there, he decided to send his photos to a modeling agency. He quickly found great success with assignments resulting in photographs in newspapers and magazines, including Harper's Bazaar as well as on billboards and book covers. He then adopted the name Guy Williams in the 1940s on the advice of his agent Henry Willson after a director refused to cast him because of his on-screen moniker, Guido Armando, that sounded "too foreign".

In 1946, Williams signed a one-year contract with Metro-Goldwyn-Mayer and moved to Hollywood. For his debut, he had a featured role as the Enola Gay bombardier in the MGM docudrama The Beginning or the End (1947), about the development of the atom bomb. He appeared in only a few films afterwards and soon returned to New York.

In 1948, to advertise cigarettes while skiing, Williams did an extensive filming trip accompanied by Janice Cooper, a John Robert Powers model. During the long photographic sessions, they fell in love, marrying on December 8, just after they returned to New York City. They had two children, Guy Steven Catalano (aka Guy Williams Jr.) and Antoinette Catalano (aka Toni Williams); both became actors.

By 1950, Williams was filming some of the pioneering television commercials in the U.S. His father died in 1951, never to witness his son's rise to fame. In 1952, Williams obtained a new one-year contract with Universal-International and moved to Hollywood. He also appeared in an episode of The Lone Ranger, playing a town sheriff.

=== Early Hollywood (1951–1957) ===
Guy Williams appeared in small supporting roles in films, including:

- The Day the Earth Stood Still (1951) (uncredited) as Radar Operator at beginning of film
- Bonzo Goes to College (1952) – as Ronald Calkins
- The Mississippi Gambler (1953) – as Andre
- The Golden Blade (1953) – as Baghdad's town crier
- The Man from the Alamo (1953) – as a sergeant
- Take Me to Town (1953) – as a small hero
- Highway Patrol (1955) – as Patrolman Hanson
- I Was a Teenage Werewolf (1957) – as police officer

In 1953, he suffered a serious accident when he fell from a horse and was dragged over 200 yards, resulting in a long scar on his left shoulder. Because of this he returned to New York to continue acting and modeling there and temporarily abandoned his film career. In 1953, he left Universal and became a freelancer for movies produced by Allied Artists and Warner Brothers.

=== Zorro (1957–1959, 1960–1961) ===
Early in 1957, Williams appeared twice in the role of Steve Clay in the television series Men of Annapolis, a military drama set at the United States Naval Academy. He also appeared in the Rod Cameron drama State Trooper in the episode "No Fancy Cowboys" about the defrauding of guests at a dude ranch.

Gene Sheldon and Guy Williams

About this time, the Walt Disney Company was casting for Zorro, a television series based on the character created in 1919 by Johnston McCulley: the young nobleman Don Diego de la Vega and his masked alter ego Zorro. To play the main character, the chosen actor would have to be handsome and have some experience with fencing. Walt Disney interviewed Guy Williams, telling him to start growing a mustache "neither very long or thick." The exclusive contract paid Williams the then very high wage of $2,500 per week, equivalent to $21,000 in 2024. Williams resumed his professional training in fencing with the Belgian champion Fred Cavens (who also trained Douglas Fairbanks, Errol Flynn and Tyrone Power), since the show required sword fights in most episodes. He also took guitar lessons with the famous Vicente Gomez. Williams' first appearance as Zorro was on the Disney anthology television series The Fourth Anniversary Show, wherein he challenged the notion that Zorro was a fictional character.

The series of half-hour episodes debuted on ABC on October 10, 1957. It was an instant hit in the U.S. Seventy-eight episodes were produced over two seasons (1957–1959), and two movies were edited from TV episodes: The Sign of Zorro (1958) and Zorro the Avenger (1959). The theme song was composed by Norman Foster and George Bruns and performed by The Mellomen; it reached #17 on the Hit Parade. In 1959, a legal dispute arose between Disney and ABC, causing a hiatus and the eventual cancellation of Zorro. However, four hour-long episodes were produced with the original primary cast, including Williams. These episodes were released as part of the Walt Disney Presents series between October 30, 1960, and April 12, 1961.

On March 5, 1959, as Zorro was ending its original run, Williams was a guest star, along with Sally Brophy and Tom Nolan, on The Ford Show, Starring Tennessee Ernie Ford.

In 1962, Williams played Sir Miles Hendon in Walt Disney's The Prince and the Pauper, shot in England.

=== European films ===
After finishing his contract with Disney, Guy Williams went to Europe to film two movies:

- Damon and Pythias (MGM production filmed in Italy in 1962, directed by Curtis Bernhardt), as Damon, the classic Greek hero who offers his life as warrant of the word of Pythias (played by Don Burnett), his friend who has been condemned to death for political reasons;
- Captain Sindbad (MGM production filmed in Germany in 1962, directed by Byron Haskin, based on the classic tale of the Arabian Nights), in the role of Sindbad the Sailor.

=== Bonanza (1964) ===
In 1964, Guy Williams returned to Hollywood to resume his career, being added to the cast of the hit TV series Bonanza as Ben's nephew Will Cartwright. Williams found himself written out of the series after five episodes despite being slated to become one of the four permanent leads. His character had been created as a replacement for Adam Cartwright, since actor Pernell Roberts planned to leave the show at the end of that season, thus allowing the format with four regular leads to continue. Fans wrote in to keep the original Cartwrights and producers held Roberts to his contract and kept him on for another season.

=== Lost in Space (1965–1968) ===
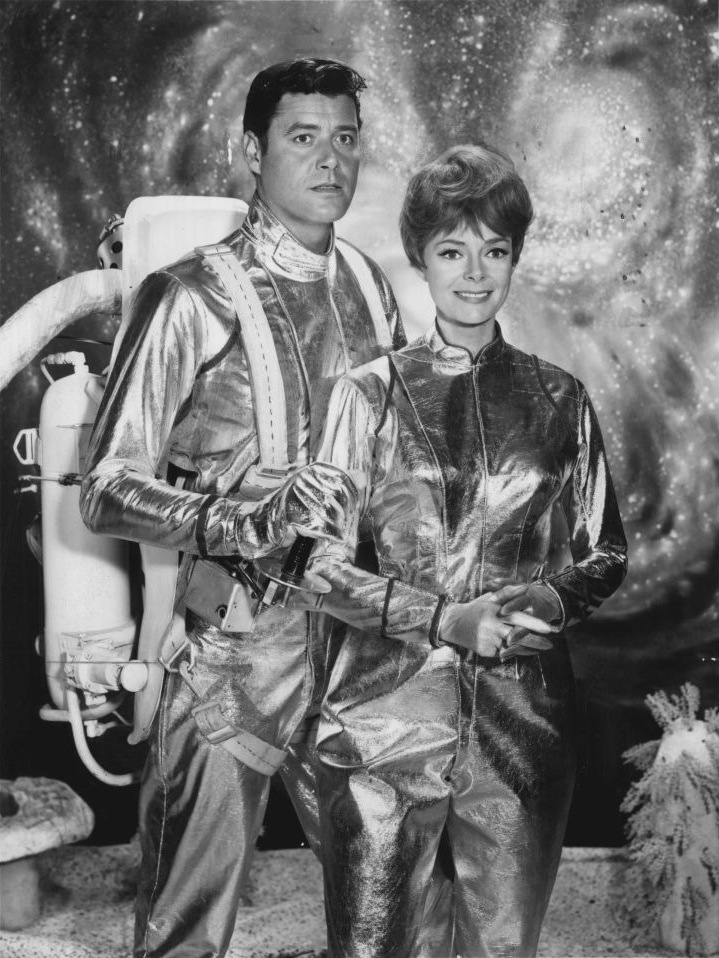
Williams and June Lockhart in Lost in Space

In 1965, Guy Williams returned to weekly television in the popular science-fiction series Lost in Space with June Lockhart as his wife. Williams played Professor John Robinson, an expert in astrophysics and geology, who commanded the mission of the Jupiter 2 spaceship, taking his family on a voyage to colonize the Alpha Centauri star system.

=== First visit to Argentina (April 1973) ===
Williams always had a frank and open temperament, was a great connoisseur of wine, a chess and fencing enthusiast and a great lover of travel. As early as 1969, at the end of Lost in Space, he was disappointed that no job offer materialized. He then decided to retire to enjoy his small fortune earned by investing in various businesses.

Starting on January 2, 1967, Channel 13 television in Buenos Aires broadcast "Zorro" during the daytime every day from 12:30 to 1:00 p.m. and evenings from 7:00 to 7:30 p.m., with great success. In the late 1960s and early 1970s, toy stores, kiosks and newsstands throughout Argentina sold action figures, costumes, and all kinds of Zorro-related merchandise.

Due to the success of the series, Channel 13 management had the idea to meet with Williams to see how he would feel about starring in a variety of children's programming at the station. The journalist Leonardo Gleizer was tasked with traveling to the US to make contact with Williams:

When I arrived in New York it was very difficult to know where Williams would live. After several unsuccessful inquiries, it occurred to me to look in the telephone directory. To my surprise, Guy Williams lived in California. I called him and got an answer from a woman (Janice, Williams' wife). I spoke with him, telling him that I had come all the way from Argentina to look for him and that I thought he would be attracted to the idea. She told me to go see him at his home in California. He picked me up at the airport. When I saw him without a mustache, I suggested he grow one. A fortnight after that first call, we went to Buenos Aires.

Willams's arrival at the Ministro Pistarini International Airport of Ezeiza, on Sunday, 1 April, 1973, was a tremendous event. Thousands of children with their parents came to the Airport to greet the actor. Guy agreed to dress up as Zorro in several programs of Channel 13 (something he had emphatically rejected in the USA) and to make a small fencing exhibition in the program Teleshow (Channel 13, Monday to Friday from 2:30 to 5:00 p.m.) hosted by Víctor Sueiro.

Such was the success of the presentation in Sueiro's program that the channel's wardrobe department made a costume similar to the one in the popular series, with which Williams also appeared in Porcelandia (Wednesdays from 9:30 to 10:30 p.m.), where Jorge Porcel had a sketch called El Sorro con S; in this program they needed to recreate a fencing scene. Williams' contender was the very young Argentine fencing champion Fernando Lupiz (who in 2005 presented a daily TV show where he taught fencing and showed Zorro cartoons), who was about to turn 20 years old.

Each program where Williams appeared achieved ratings of over 90 points, something historic for the Channel, so another trip was planned for that same year.

=== Second visit to Argentina (July 1973) ===
On Saturday July 14, 1973 Guy Williams made his second visit to Argentina. About 50,000 people (children and adults) crowded the runway of the Ezeiza international airport, shouting “Zorro, Zorro!”, waiting for the arrival of Pan Am flight 201. First, Williams and his wife Janice got off the plane and were welcomed by Leo Gleizer, the journalist who had arranged Williams' first trip to Argentina.

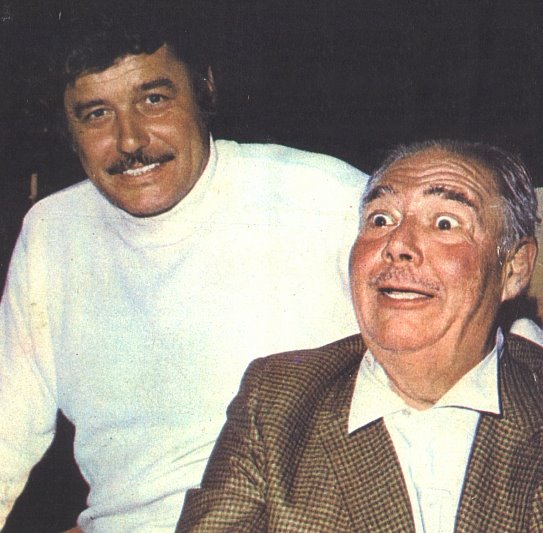
Williams and Henry Calvin during his second visit to Argentina in 1973

Suddenly, a thunderous roar was heard from the crowd: the lyric baritone and actor Henry Calvin — the obese Sergeant Demetrio López García from the El Zorro series — who was recognized in spite of his emaciated appearance (he had an undiagnosed throat cancer). When asked how he had stopped being fat, Calvin said he had set out to lose 80 kilos, and he had succeeded. He had begun his career in the 1930s as a singer (he had a baritone voice, which he once showed in El Zorro).

Channel 13 assigned an assistant, a translator and a driver to attend them. On the day of their arrival in Argentina, they had dinner at a restaurant on the Río de la Plata waterfront. The next day they attended a tanguería in the emblematic area of Caminito, in the La Boca neighborhood, where Williams learned to dance the Tango. There Williams tried Mate, while his companion continued drinking beer and white wine mendocino. They both agreed on meals: Argentine asado (barbecue) and marinated suckling pig were their favorite dishes. They also visited schools and public hospitals, where they signed autographs for the children. During this stay, Zorro fought a duel at Carlitos Balá's Magic Circus and was seen for the first time at Mirtha Legrand’s lunchtime show, which aired on Sundays from noon to 2:30 p.m. and where it was common for the host to invite different artists to join her for a live lunch at the table. This scene would be repeated over the following years, by which time Williams had already decided to settle in Buenos Aires.

Calvin accompanied him to Channel 13, where they did a show (each in costume). Such was the popularity that Williams and Calvin enjoyed in Argentina that Channel 9 (Telefe) called them to attend Susana Giménez's program, which was broadcast on Sundays from 8 pm to 10:30 p.m. Both would soon return to California, where Guy continued his business of making Panetone (Italian sweet bread).

=== Third visit to Argentina and circus tour in America (1974 and 1979) ===
The third visit was in December 1974, this time alone and incognito. In 1979 Guy Williams returned to Buenos Aires, not for a contract with Channel 13, but to produce his own shows. He had separated from his wife, and his new traveling Zorro partner was now Fernando Lúpiz (26), disguised as Captain Monasterio. Although he wore a mustache like his character, the boy was too young for the role. To promote the show, Zorro appeared in the programs Patolandia (starring comedian Pato Carret) and El Capitán Piluso (starring comedian Alberto Olmedo). Williams presented his show for two months throughout the country, with excellent reviews.

This show was presented in several circuses, where the character that all Argentine children wanted to see in person was reserved for the grand finale. In the arena, the presenter would announce it with pomp. Zorro (who, at 6' 2" tall, was much taller than expected) appeared on his black horse, waving with his right hand. After a few words, Captain Monasterio (Lúpiz) appeared, starting the fight, which lasted several minutes, with the expected victory of Williams. Zorro's participation was short, about 15 minutes, but everyone present was amazed to see their hero (whose adventures they followed daily on the small screen). On Buenos Aires' Sarmiento Avenue there was a gigantic billboard with the silhouette of the idol and a letter “Z”.

=== Film cancelled with Palito Ortega ===
In 1977, producers Carlos Montero (from channel 13) and Enrique García Fuertes announced the project El Zorro y su hijo, a film that would star Williams and Lúpiz. At this time, producer Carlos Patiño began negotiations to hire Zorro for the Real Madrid circus of the Seguras brothers, a show in which it was customary to see famous figures. Real Madrid was the biggest success in Mar del Plata during 1977 and 1978. From December 1977 to March 1978, 250,000 people applauded Zorro in person.

The Zorro fever did not end. Williams made many Argentine friends, and was enchanted by the country. The film project became an obsession for Guy. It had started as a side project, but soon Williams realized it would be the resurrection of his career. He began working on the script and sets. His intention was to use real natural sites in Argentina. The working title of the story was Zorro. The project was very ambitious, estimated at three million dollars, too expensive for Argentina's unstable economy, but he insisted that it would be seen at the same time in 65 countries.

The only one who could finance the film was the singer and actor Palito Ortega. Ortega made many changes to the script and filming locations that Williams had chosen. Ortega also ordered that the role of Bernardo be played by Carlitos Balá. It had also been decided that the role of Captain Monasterio would be played by the Argentine actor Alfredo Alcón (and not his partner Lúpiz). For Guy this was too much, not because he did not like Balá or Alcón, but because he saw his work of three years disappearing under Ortega's wishes. Thus the project was aborted.

Without the film, Williams had nothing to do in Buenos Aires and returned to California in the early 1980s. The script of the project can be seen at the Museo del Cine de Buenos Aires.

=== Final years in Argentina (1980–1989) ===
Williams soon returned to the city that had welcomed him with open arms and embraced him as an idol. During this final period in Buenos Aires, Guy kept a low profile. Only rarely did an article appear in Radiolandia magazine stating that Zorro was living in Buenos Aires. The actor enjoyed having coffee at La Biela, in the Recoleta neighborhood, while reading Buenos Aires Herald. He was often seen walking from the Alvear Hotel to the building where he lived and where everyone knew him. Williams continued to make Argentine friends.

In 1982, Williams sent a formal request to the American Embassy in Buenos Aires asking permission to volunteer as an ambulance driver for the Argentinian Army during the Falklands War, as his old age made him unfit for any combat role. He was never called up, and would later joke saying "Argentina missed Zorro fighting for the Falklands".

In 1983, Williams returned to Los Angeles for three final television appearances. He joined Lost in Space cast members June Lockhart, Angela Cartwright, Bob May, and Marta Kristen for three celebrity episodes of Family Feud against the casts of Batman, Hawaiian Eye, and Gilligan's Island respectively. He later appeared as a guest on Good Morning America.

During his final years, Williams invested in real estate in Argentina and spent his time walking or drinking coffee in the cafes of the Recoleta neighborhood. In between, he suffered a stroke in 1983 from which he recovered slowly, and after which he gave up on his attempt to return to Los Angeles.

== Death ==
In 1989, after spending solitary months in Argentina, it was reported that Williams had disappeared. The local police searched his apartment in Recoleta on May 6, 1989, and found his body; an autopsy revealed he had died a week before of a ruptured brain aneurysm. Williams had already suffered an aneurysm in 1983.

Thanks to the efforts of Fernando Lupiz (Williams's friend and confidant), Williams, a Roman Catholic, was given a Catholic funeral and service in the chapel at La Chacarita Cemetery, attended by many Argentine actors and friends Williams had made during his years in the country. His ashes were interred in the mausoleum of the Argentine Actors' Association (despite the rule that it is reserved only for Argentine actors) at La Chacarita. In 1991, Steve Catalano (Guy Williams Jr.) received his father's ashes and, in accordance with the actor's last wishes, they were scattered in the mountains of Southern California and in the Pacific Ocean off the coast of Malibu.

== Homages ==
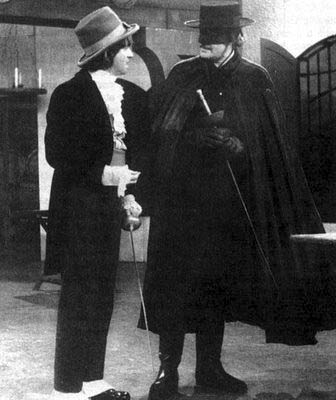
Williams as Zorro with Carlos Balá in a 1973 Argentine television show appearance

- In 2000, Williams was the first local celebrity inducted into the Bronx Walk of Fame. He was represented at the ceremony by his son Steven Catalano (Guy Williams Jr.)
- In 2001, (August 2), he was posthumously granted a star on the Hollywood Walk of Fame, at 7080 Hollywood Blvd after petitions from thousands of his fans in front of the Hollywood Chamber of Commerce in 2000.
- In October 2002, the fans of Williams, with his children Steven and Toni in attendance, dedicated a bench to him in New York's Central Park.
- In August 2003, fans belonging to an online group Guy Williams' Friendslist, along with Williams' wife Janice, their children Steven and Toni, and Toni's son Nando in attendance, placed a commemorative plaque dedicated to Williams in the Old Cemetery section of the Mission San Luis Rey de Francia at Oceanside, California, where the Zorro series was filmed in 1957.
- In 2011, Williams was named a Disney Legend.

A number of books have been written which feature Williams, particularly in his role as Zorro. This includes the Zorro Television Companion, detailing the making of the Disney series, as well as a biography by Antoinette Girgenti Lane, Guy Williams: The Man Behind the Mask (2005).

A collection of original Zorro short stories, some inspired specifically by Guy Williams, was edited by Richard Dean Starr and released in 2008. It includes an introduction by Guy Williams Jr. (with Matthew Baugh) and an afterword by Isabel Allende. The cover art on the trade paperback edition by Douglas Klauba was a homage to Guy Williams.

== Filmography ==
=== Films ===
Year	Film	Role	Notes
1947	The Beginning or the End	Enola Gay bombardier	Uncredited
1951	The Day the Earth Stood Still	Radar Operator	Uncredited
1952	Bonzo Goes to College	Ronald Calkins	
1952	Back at the Front	Quartermaster Captain	Uncredited
1953	The Mississippi Gambler	Andre	
1953	House Party	Short	Short film
1953	Take Me to Town	Hero in Snow	Uncredited
1953	All I Desire	Party Guest	Uncredited
1953	The Man from the Alamo	Sergeant	
1953	The Golden Blade	Baghdad's town crier	Uncredited
1955	Seven Angry Men	Salmon Brown	
1955	Sincerely Yours	Dick Cosgrove	Uncredited
1955	The Last Frontier	Lieutenant Benton	Uncredited
1957	I Was a Teenage Werewolf	Officer Chris Stanley	
1962	The Prince and the Pauper	Miles Hendon	
1962	Damon and Pythias	Damon	
1963	Captain Sindbad	Captain Sinbad	

=== Television ===
Year	Title	Role	Notes
1951	Studio One		Episode: The Paris Feeling
1955	The Mickey Rooney Show	Elliot Ross, Dr. Pierce	Episode: Seven Days to Doom
1955	The Mickey Rooney Show	Edwards, Network Executive	Episode: The Average Man
1955	Four Star Playhouse	Dick	Episode: Trudy
1955	Damon Runyon Theater		Episode: Big Shoulders
1955	The Lone Ranger	Sheriff Will Harrington	Episode: Six-Gun Artist
1955	Cameo Theatre		Episode: Bending of the Bough
1955	The Loretta Young Show		Episode: The Last Spring
1956	Crossroads	1st Soldier	Episode: The Comeback
1956–57	Highway Patrol	Officer	Episode: Runaway Boy
1956–57	Highway Patrol	Officer Barney	Episode: Plane Crash
1956–57	Highway Patrol	Officer Hansen	Episode: Harbor Story
1956–57	Highway Patrol	Jerry March	Episode: Officer's Wife
1957	Cavalcade of America	First Player	Episode: Decision for a Hero
1957	State Trooper	Vince Breedon	Episode: No Fancy Cowboys
1957	Code 3	Chet Larmon	Episode: Bail Out (uncredited)
1957–1958	Men of Annapolis	Steve Clay	Episode: Seawall
1957–1958	Men of Annapolis	Mike	Episode: The Fight
1958	Sergeant Preston of the Yukon	Jim Lorane	Episode: The Generous Hobo
1957–1961	Zorro	Zorro	Main role: 78 episodes
1957–1961	Walt Disney Presents	Zorro	Main role: 5 episodes
1964	Bonanza	Will Cartwright	5 episodes
1965–1968	Lost in Space	Dr. John Robinson	Main cast: 84 episodes
