= Channel 9 (Comodoro Rivadavia, Argentina) =

Television station in Comodoro Rivadavia, Chubut, Argentina

LU 83 TV Canal 9
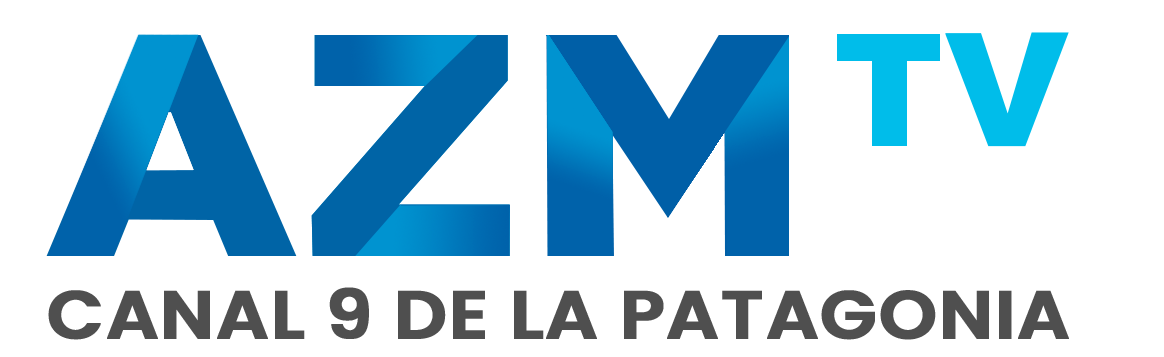
- Comodoro Rivadavia, Chubut; Argentina
- Channels: Analog: 9 (VHF)
- Branding: AZM TV

Ownership
- Owner: Azul Media

History
- First air date: September 21, 1964
- Former names: Canal 9 Comodoro Rivadavia (1964-2021)

Technical information
- Licensing authority: ENACOM

Links
- Website: azmtvcanal9.com.ar

Canal 9 de Comodoro Rivadavia, commercially known as AZM TV, is an Argentine television station licensed to Comodoro Rivadavia. The station can be seen in southern Chubut Province and adjacent areas through relay stations. It is operated by Grupo Azul Media.

== History ==
On October 10, 1963, by means of Decree 9060, the National Executive Chamber granted company Comodoro Rivadavia S.C.T.R. (at the time in the process of being formed and composed of a staff of 5 people) a license to operate VHF channel 9 in the city of Comodoro Rivadavia; however, the same founding shareholders were also owners of the company (reconverted to Comodoro Rivadavia TV S.C.C.T.R. in 1964).

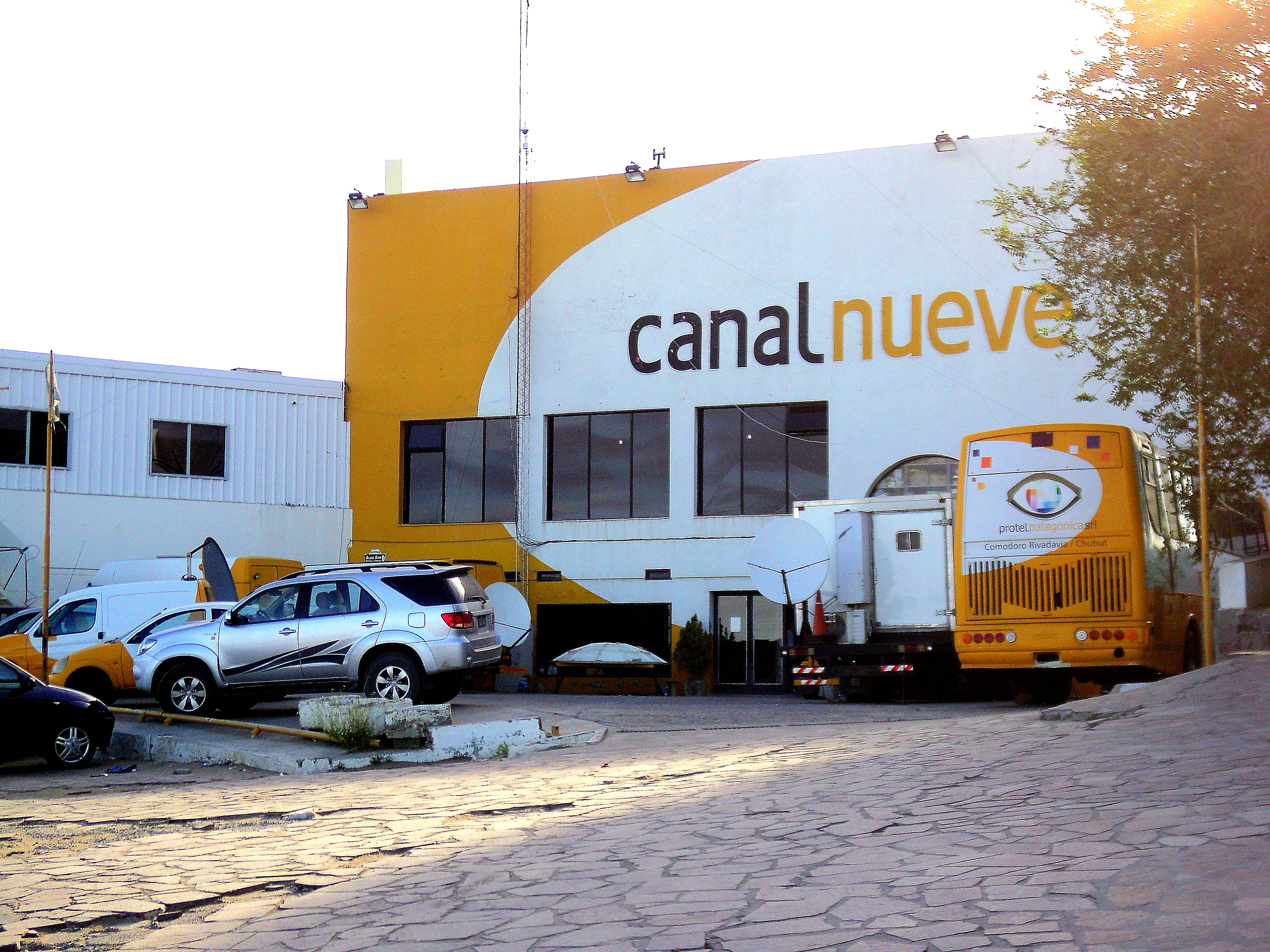
Headquarters of the channel, currently occupied by another company.

The license started regular broadcasts on September 21, 1964, as LU 83 TV Canal 9 de Comodoro Rivadavia.

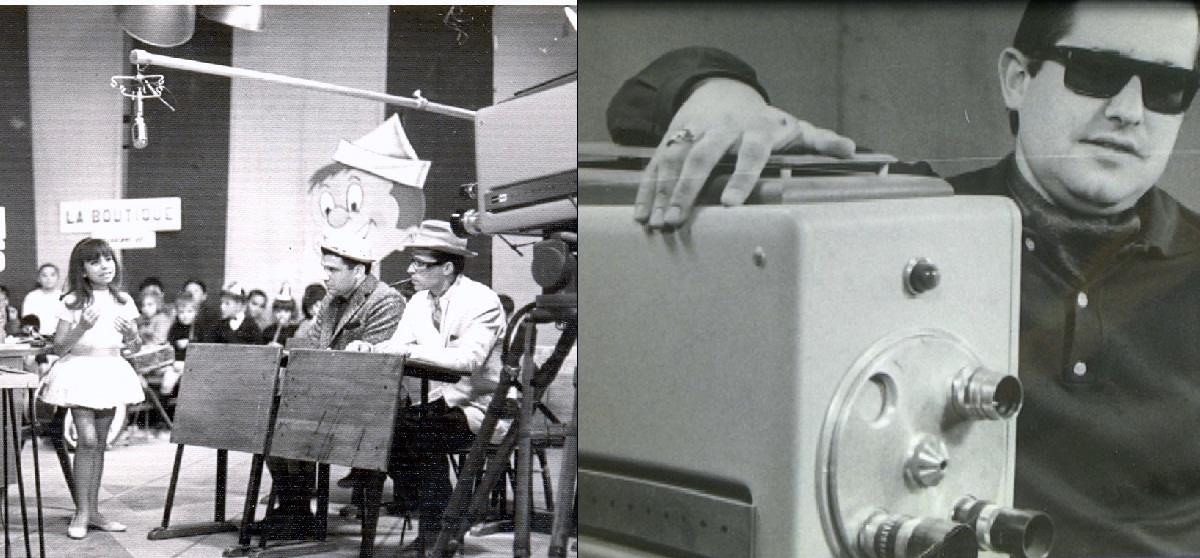
Canal 9's presentation of La Legión de los Pibes (left) and Antúnez next to the station's first camera (right).

That way, the station opened with the Argentine National Anthem. Authorities from several regions of Argentina came, the national anthem played and a pre-recorded speech from president Arturo Umberto Illia followed. It was born at a time when cable operators and satellite signals did not exist yet; the first color images were seen in the early 80s, and dozens of political and cultural references of the province appeared on screen.

On November 12, 1982, through Decree 1207, the Executive Chamber renewed the station's license.

In May 1985, Canal 9 becomes the first television station in the country to install its own cable television service.

On July 30, 1987, COMFER, through Resolution 415, authorized the installation of a relay station in Lago Blanco, on VHF channel 13; however, on November 21, 1989 (through Resolution 2347),the relay station's move to channel 4 was solicited.

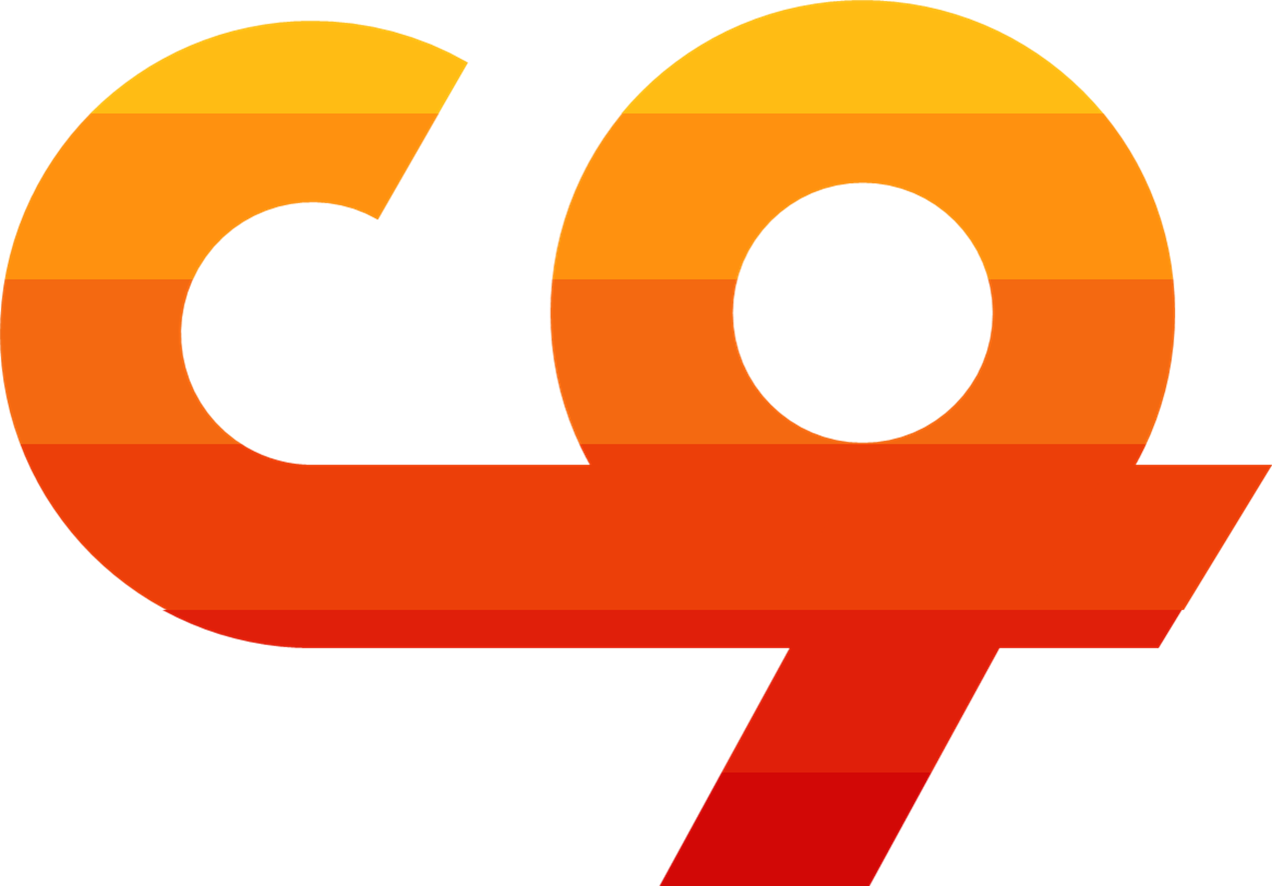
Logo used from 1990 to 2003.

On April 1, 1992, through Decree 566, the National Executive Chamber enabled Comodoro Rivadavia TV S.C.C.T.R. (licensee of Canal 9) the entrance of Salmerón Armando Picón.

At the end of 2001, a group of Canal 9 employees founded a production company called Protel Patagónica SRL; due to the work created by the production company, especially its third-party services (national, provincial and municipal), it enabled the station to continue operating.

In April 2012, businessman Cristóbal López initiated the acquisition of a 40% package of Protel Patagónica SRL with the aim of including it in his holding Grupo Indalo. At the same time, the businessman acquired a part of Radio del Mar (FM 98.7 MHz), as well as the entirety of Diario Patagónico. It also tried to acquire the city's other newspaper, Diario Crónica, which did not prosper. All of Protel Patagónica SRL's assets are still at the hands of its founding owners, Luis Nicotra, Rubén Nicotra, Daniel Fasciglione y Belén Sansberro.

In 2014, the owners of Protel Patagónica SRL initiated the process to renew its broadcasting license following AFSCA regulations for over-the-air stations. In 2016, for the change of the broadcasting mechanics from both the national and provincial government, which withdrew the usage of services to third-parties offered by the company, the station was on the verge of collapse. In order to preserve its workforce, in August that year, the company presented itself at a creditors' contest, having won the bid in January 2019. The entirety of the production company and the station's assets continue at the hands of the founding owners.

Even with the dire economic scenario the station was facing, both the production company and the station continued in operation, tied with the inevitable conversion to high definition television. By renewing the license, the station remains operational until 2034.

Since April 2020, under the direction of Daniel Taito, Grupo Azul Media is formed. Canal 9 and Protel Patagónica joined it, consolidating a single editorial line not only with regional facets, but also national ones.

Logo used before the rename to AZM TV.

On August 13, 2021, the station, was made available on the ARSAT-1 satellite. As consequence of this change, it adopted the commercial name AZM TV Canal 9 de la Patagonia maintaining its callsign.

On June 29, 2023, its analog signal was switched off, along the other stations in the Argentine south, in line with ENACOM Decree 156/2022, aiming to convert to a digital signal.

== Programming ==
Local programming includes news service División Noticias, Informate (morning news), Patagonia en vivo (early evening program), Chubut hoy (provincial news), Chamameceros, Sangre nueva (musical program), Historias al sur (cultural program) and Clave política (political program).

== División Noticias ==
División Noticias is the station's news service, with two editions on weekdays (at 13:00 and 20:30) and one edition on Saturdays (at 20:00).

== Relayers ==
Canal 9 has four relay stations in southern Chubut Province and two in northern Santa Cruz Province.

Chubut Province
Channel	Location
12	General Mosconi
83	Las Flores
73	Pampa del Castillo
13	Sarmiento

Santa Cruz Province
Channel	Location
6	Cañadón Seco
11	Pico Truncado
