= Televisión Nacional de Chile Red Aysén =

- Country: Chile

Programming
- Language: Spanish
- Picture format: 480i SDTV

Ownership
- Owner: Televisión Nacional de Chile

History
- Launched: 21 May 1971
- Closed: 1991

Availability

Terrestrial
- Coyhaique: Channel 8

Televisión Nacional de Chile Red Aysén was a relay interconnection system of Chile's state channel, which operated independently between 1971 and 1991 from the main network which, at the time, operated from Arica to Chiloé.

== History ==
The first plans to install a television station in the former Aysén Province (the wider region that later became the new Eleventh Region in 1974 after a regionalization process, and is now known as Aysén Region) date back to 1969, when the governor of Coyhaique Department, Carlos Echeverría Blanco, noted that installing a transmitting station owned by Televisión Nacional de Chile in the city would cost 3 to 3.5 million escudos, to which additional relay stations in Puerto Aysén and Balmaceda would be added.

The origins of Televisión Nacional de Chile (TVN) in Aysén lie with the installation of canal 8, Coyhaique's first television station, with a 50-watt transmitter and an 80-watt power. On May 5, 1971, trucks with the station's equipment arrived to Coyhaique, which would be installed in front of the city's square, in the building occupied by Dirección de Vialidad y el Ministerio de Obras Públicas; That same day, four technicians arrived to Coyhaique, tasked to put the station on air: Abelino Canales Meza (technical chief) and operators Carlos Villegas, Dantón Concha Tueve and Luis Medina Sánchez, whereas on May 8, Manuel Zuleta (secretary-general of TVN) and journalist Juan Ramón Silva arrived to the Aysenine capital, which hired Baldo Araya Uribe and Gustavo López as its first journalist and photographer, respectively, from the nascent press department.

Canal 8 Coyhaique started broadcasting on May 21, 1971, and its first announcer was Óscar Real Hermosilla, who, in its inaugural broadcast, presented a pre-recorded intervention from president Salvador Allende. Its first director was Amado Alfaro Aguilera, who, together with twelve other professionals, made part of its human resources.

On September 11, 1974 TVN's transmitting station in the city of Puerto Aysén started, on channel 10 with a 50-watt transmitter and 300-watt power; due to geographic limitations, it was also an independent station which was not connected to the one in Coyhaique. On May 27, 1979 both stations were interconnected upon Entel Chile's installation of a microwave link between both cities, forming what was known as a "micro-regional network" at TVN.

At the time of its fifth anniversary, on May 21, 1976, Canal 8 Coyhaique produced over forty documentaries; among them Desove de la trucha marrón en el río Ibáñez, Operación de quistes hidatídicos, Reconocimiento del río Baker en El Saltón, as well as news reports on the eruption of the Hudson volcano in 1971, the fall of the Squella airplane, and the recognation of the Isla Guamblín National Park. The station's equipment consisted of Luis Otaíza Carreño (director), Gabriela Greve Uria (administrative secretary), Baldo Araya Uribe (journalist), Hernán Ibarra Verdejo (camerographer), Lany Neumann Santana (laboratorist), Manuel Campos Gallardo (regional technical chief), Rubén Rivas Apablaza (announcer), Aldo Bórquez Ojeda (assistant) and operators Ciro Mella Salvo, Dantón Concha Tueve, Patricio Stumpfoll Rodríguez and Carlos Villegas Escobar.

On May 28, 1978, the first color television equipments arrived to Coyhaique for use on the station: two videocassette equipments, a time base corrector and a synchronism generator, and an ossiloscope, among others. Color broadcasts started on June 4, 1978, with a match of the 1978 FIFA World Cup, held in Argentina. By 1979, its director was Luis Otaíza Carreño, and between 1980 and 1981, a studio with two cameras was built for it

On February 15, 1981, TVN inaugurated a new station in Chile Chico,through channel 7 and with 25 watts of power; such station initially broadcast its signals independently from the Coyhaique micronetwork, receiving programming on a two-day delay from Coyhaique and Puerto Aysén. The local technical operator as Lautaro Mansilla, it initially had a video recorder, a record player,monitors and a transmitter with a reach of forty kilometers, with which it reached to Puerto Ingeniero Ibáñez and Puerto Cristal, as well as Los Antiguos in Argentina; the latter had a relay station of Canal 9 Río Gallegos on channel 12, with that, those on the Chilean side only received television until 1981.

In addition to airing programs from TVN's main network in Santiago with days or weeks worth of delay, the Aysen regional micronetwork produced its own newscast, Panorama de Aysén, which aired before 60 minutos. During the 80s, it also aired the bingo program Telebindo and held by several social groupings (such as CEMA Chile and was also produced by other stations, such as Canal 6 Punta Arenas.

By 1983, its director was Gaspar Toro Irarrázaval. On February 13, 1984 Aysén started receiving TVN's national programming via satellite, bringing an end to delayed programming. Finally, the offices of the micro-regional network closed in 1991.
