= Deseado Department =

Coordinates: 47°44′52″S 65°53′33″W

Deseado
- Department
- Location of Deseado Department in Santa Cruz Province.
- Country: Argentina
- Province: Santa Cruz
- Seat: Puerto Deseado

Area
  - Total: 63,784 km^{2} (24,627 sq mi)

Population
  - Total: 126,743

Deseado Department is a department in Santa Cruz Province, Argentina. It covers an area of 63,784 km^{2}, and had a population of 72,953 at the 2001 Census, which rose to 107,630 at the 2010 Census and 126,743 at the 2022 Census. The seat of the department is in Puerto Deseado, with 16,747 inhabitants in 2022, but the largest town is the port of Caleta Olivia, which had 56,312 inhabitants in 2022. Other large towns in 2022 are Las Heras (24,728) and Pico Truncado (25,194).

== Municipalities ==
- Caleta Olivia
- Cañadón Seco
- Fitz Roy
- Jaramillo
- Koluel Kayke
- Pampa Alta
- Tres Cerros
- Las Heras
- Pico Truncado
- Puerto Deseado
- Tellier
