= Pampa Alta =

- Municipality and town
- Location within Argentina
- Coordinates: 47°34′S 66°16′W
- Country: Argentina
- Province: Santa Cruz Province
- Department: Deseado
- Time zone: UTC−3 (ART)

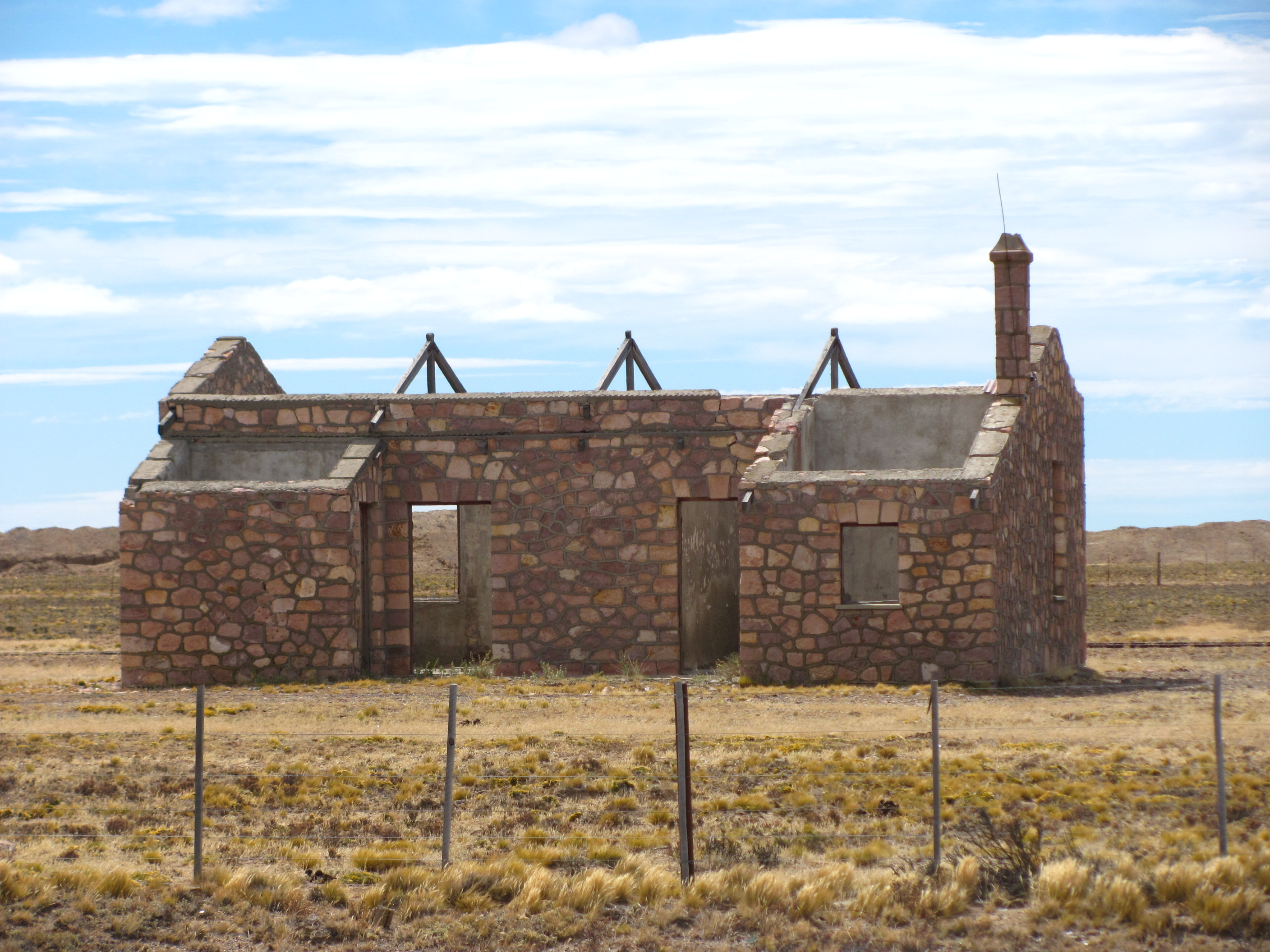
View of the Pampa Alta railway station in Santa Cruz

For the mountain pass between Chile and Argentina, see Pampa Alta Pass (Puesto Viejo).

Pampa Alta is a town and municipality in Santa Cruz Province in southern Argentina.
