= La Biela =

Bar in Buenos Aires, Argentina

Coordinates: 34°35′16″S 58°23′27″W

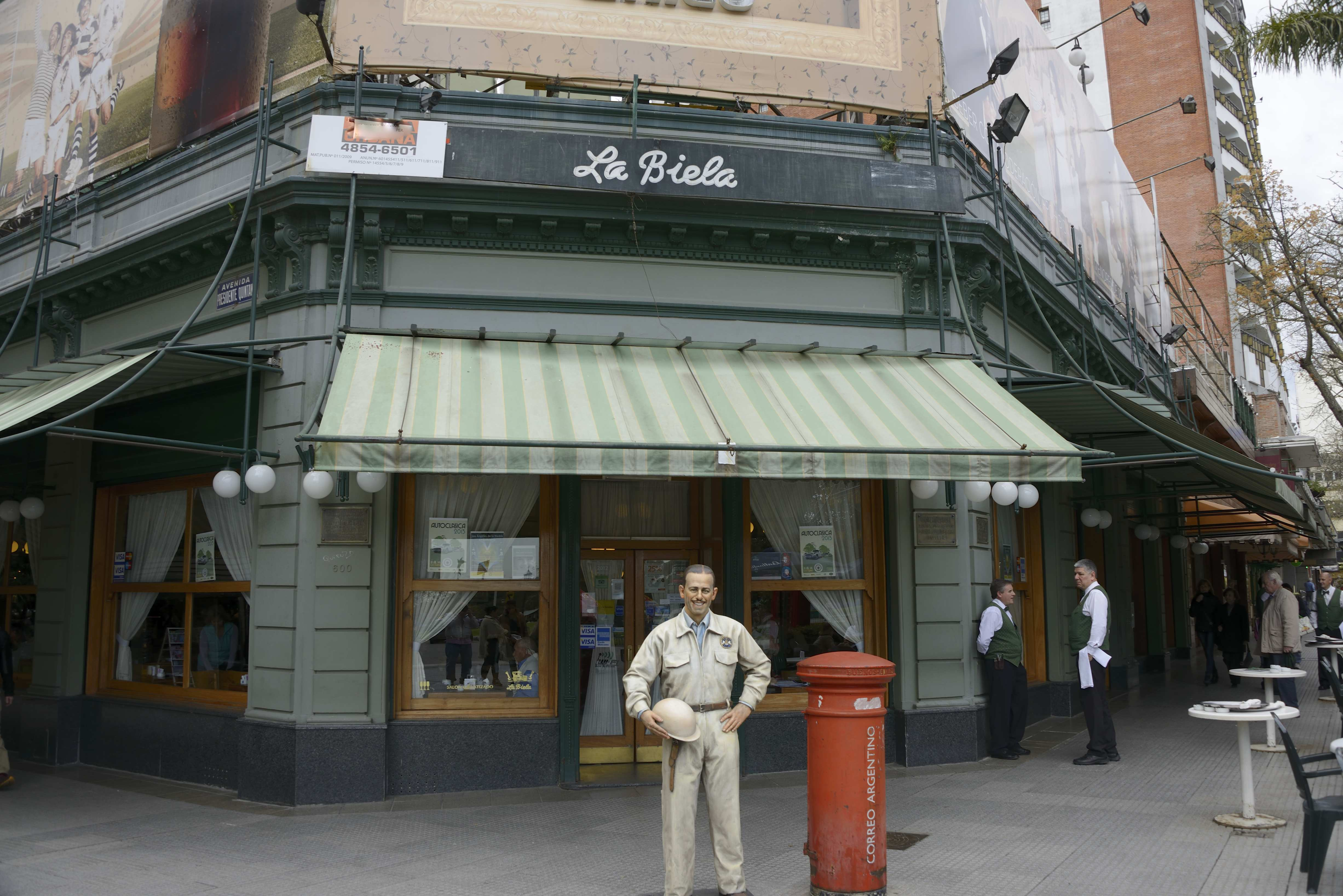
Entrance

La Biela (Spanish: The Connecting Rod) is a famous bar in the Recoleta neighbourhood of Buenos Aires frequented by the Argentine Upper Class, celebrities and tourists.

== History ==
The bar started functioning in 1850 under the name "La Viridita", its owner, a galician merchant picked its name due to the narrowness of the sidewalk in which the bar was located. Later it was renamed to "Aerobar" for its popularity among the pilots of the Air Force, which had its office nearby.

In 1942, a race took place in Recoleta and one of the drivers that were participating, Roberto Mieres had to stop in the corner in which the bar is located because his car stopped working. He said the connecting rod in his motor had melted. After this event, the owner changed the bar's name to "La Biela" (biela meaning connecting rod in spanish). Even today the chairs are decorated with images of connecting rods.

The bar started to be frequented by famous Argentine drivers such as Juan Manuel Fangio and also international drivers that visited Argentina when there were F1 races in Buenos Aires.

Adolfo Bioy Casares, the famous Argentine writer and friend of Jorge Luis Borges, went often to the bar and always followed the same routine when he spent his evenings there, journalist Miguel Wiñazki considered Bioy Casares could have been inspired by it to write his most prominent novel The Invention of Morel. Ernesto Sábato also visited frequently the bar with his secretary to dictate his novel On Heroes and Tombs. Julio Cortázar mentions La Biela explicitly in his novel 62: A Model Kit.

== Famous visitors ==
Among the famous visitors of the bar have been Francis Ford Coppola, Guy Williams, Robert Duvall, Jackie Stewart, Juan Manuel Fangio, Juan Gálvez, Emerson Fittipaldi, José Froilán González, Jorge Luis Borges, Ernesto Sábato, and Adolfo Bioy Casares.

== Gallery ==
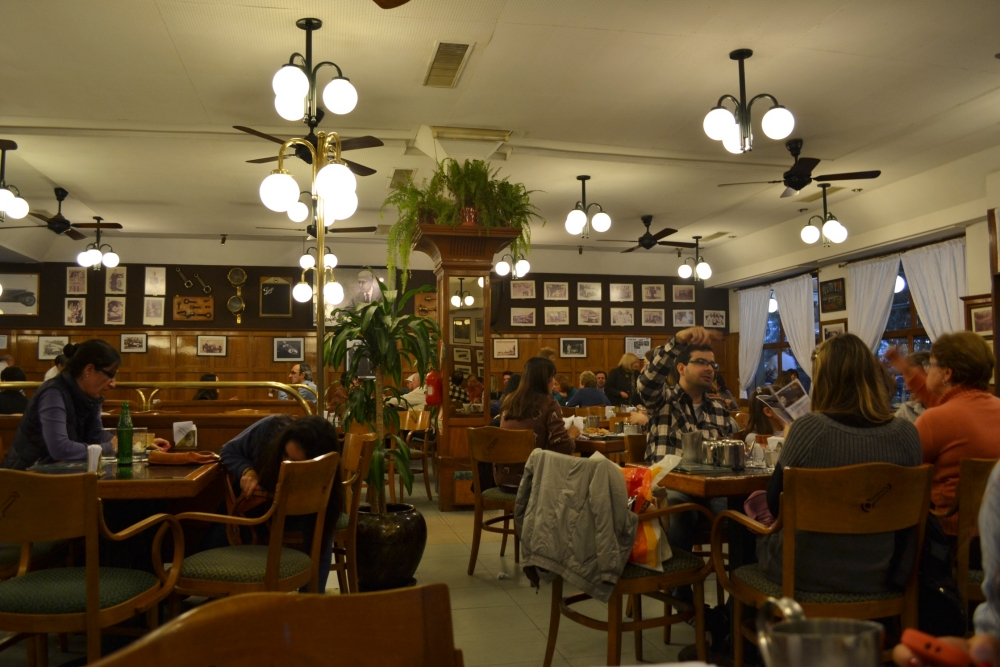

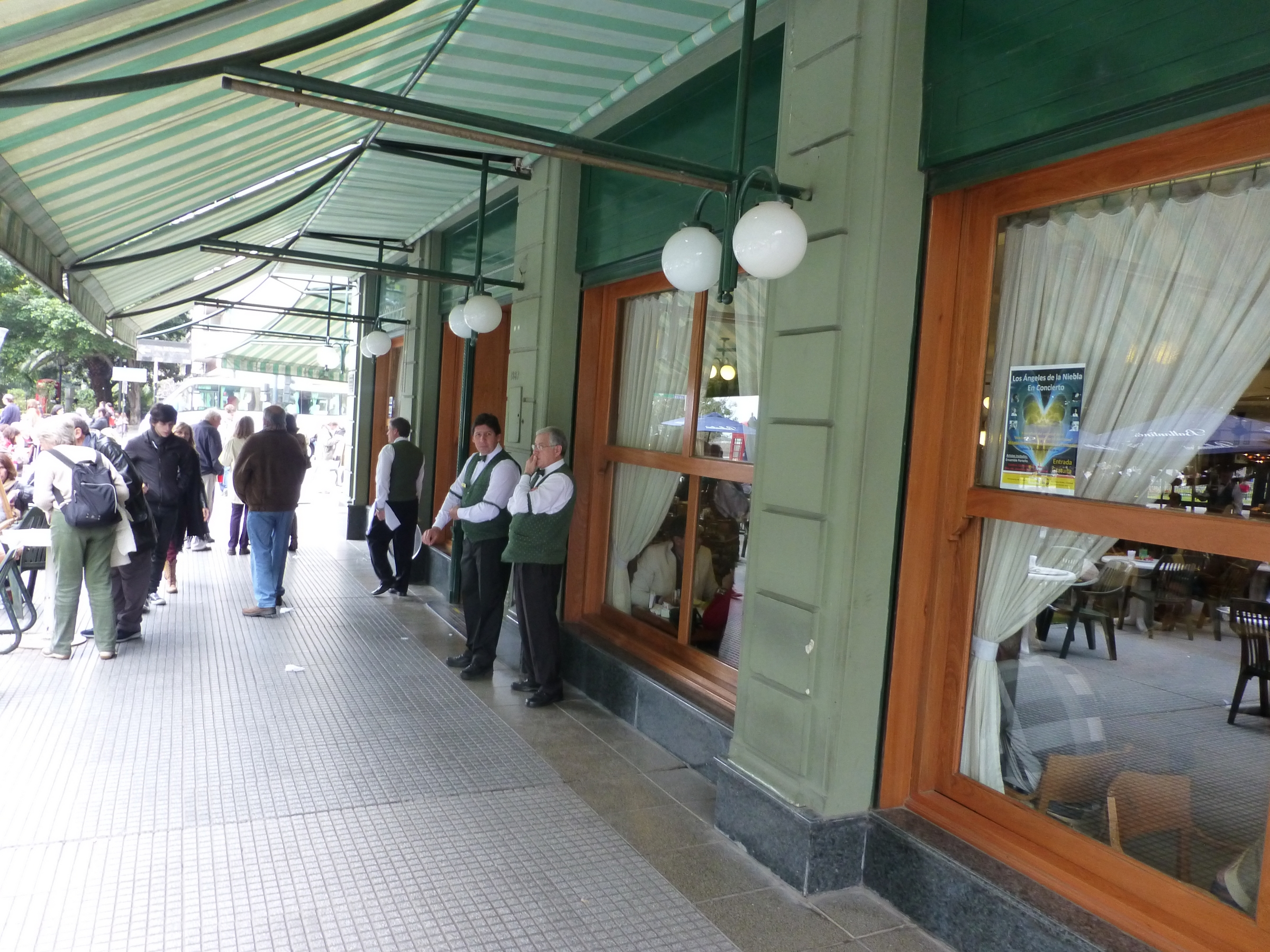

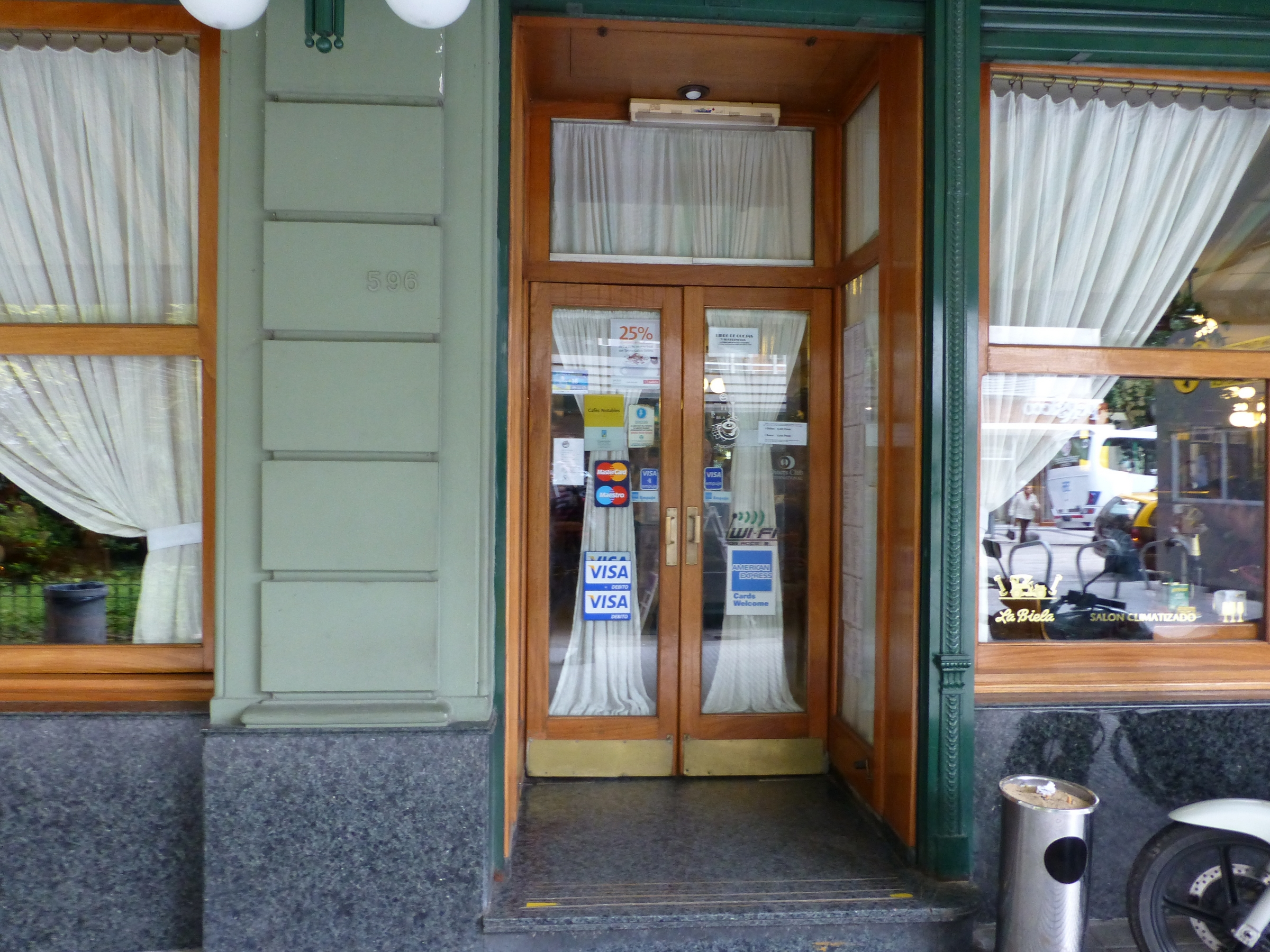

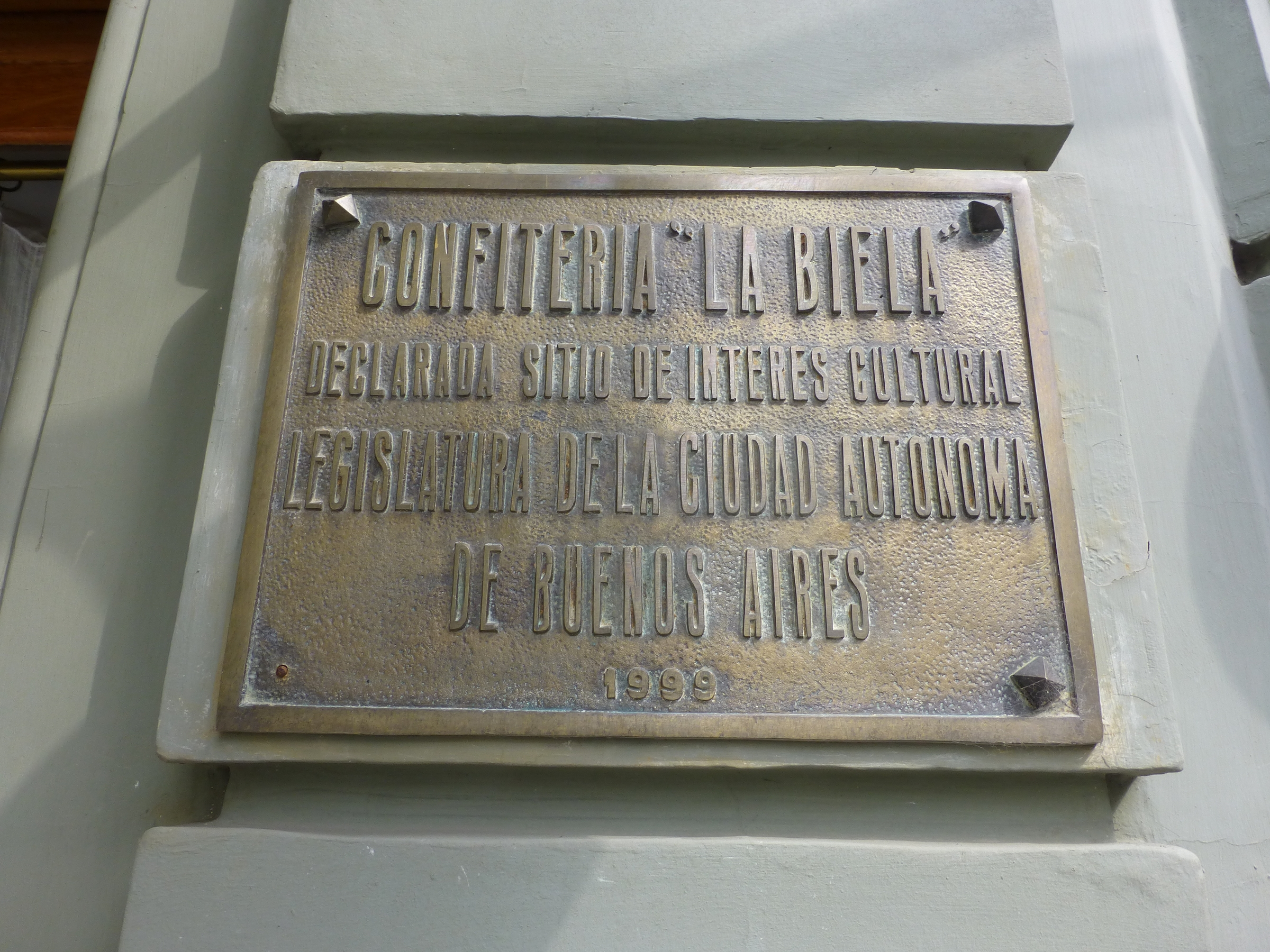

== See also ==
- Café Tortoni
- Las Violetas
