= Channel 9 TV stations in Mexico =

The following television stations broadcast on digital channel 9 in Mexico:

- XHCSAC-TDT in Purépero, Michoacán
- XHPBLM-TDT in Lagos de Moreno, Jalisco
- XHQMGU-TDT in Guadalajara, Jalisco
