= Channel 9 virtual TV stations in Canada =

The following television stations operate on virtual channel 9 in Canada:

- CBET-DT in Windsor, Ontario
- CBKT-DT in Regina, Saskatchewan
- CBOFT-DT in Ottawa, Ontario
- CBRT-DT in Calgary, Alberta
- CFTF-DT-5 in Baie-Comeau, Quebec
- CFTO-DT in Toronto, Ontario
- CHAU-DT-10 in Tracadie, New Brunswick
- CICO-DT-9 in Thunder Bay, Ontario
- CIMT-DT in Rivière-du-Loup, Quebec
- CIVG-DT in Sept-Iles, Quebec
- CKLT-DT in Saint John, New Brunswick
- CKND-DT in Winnipeg, Manitoba
- CKSH-DT in Sherbrooke, Quebec
