= Kanal 9 (Serbian TV channel) =

- Country: Serbia

History
- Launched: 1994

Links
- Website: www.tvk9.net

Kanal 9 is one of three regional television stations in Šumadija and Pomoravlje Region, operating in Kragujevac, Serbia. The company started operating in 1994.
