= Canal 9 Litoral =

LRI 450 TV Canal 9
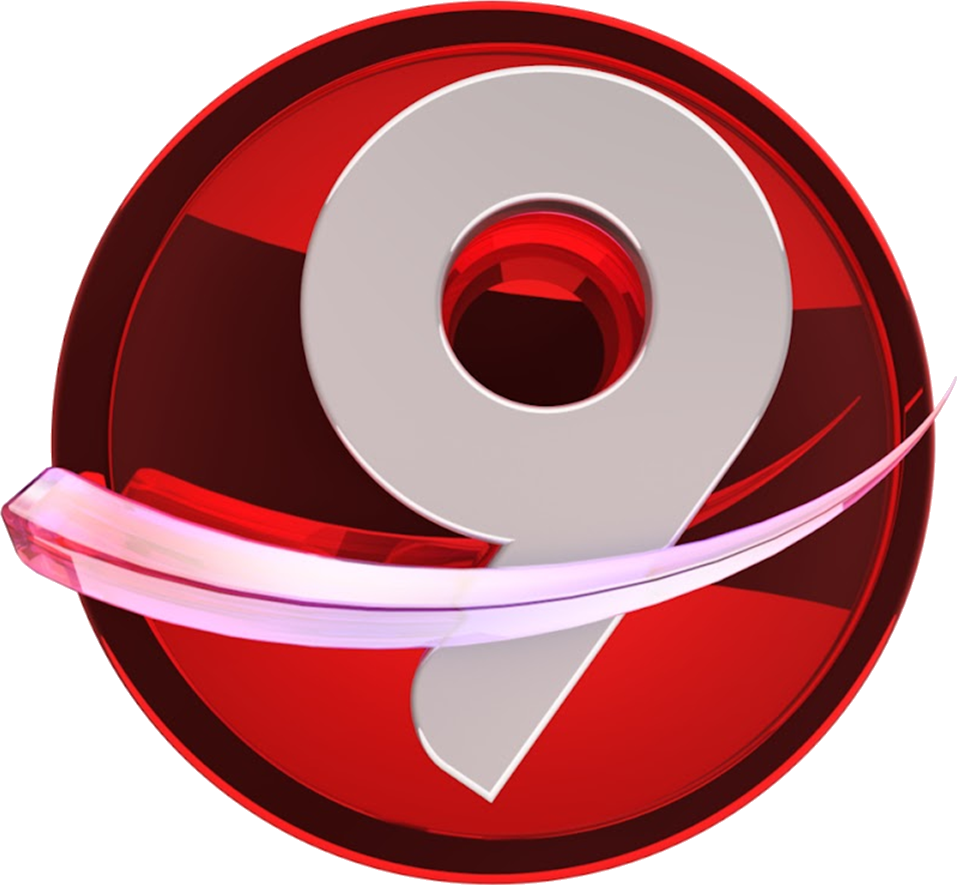

Paraná, Entre Ríos; Argentina
- Channels: Analog: 9 (VHF)
- Branding: Canal 9 Litoral

Programming
- Affiliations: El Trece

Ownership
- Owner: Grupo Neomedia (85%) Jorge Aníbal Pérez (15%); (Productores Independientes Asociados S.A.)

History
- First air date: 22 April 1985
- Former affiliations: Canal 9 (1985-2005)

Technical information
- Licensing authority: ENACOM

Links
- Website: www.9digital.com.ar

Canal 9 Litoral, is an El Trece-affiliated Argentine free-to-air television station that transmits from the city of Paraná. The channel can be seen in a large part of the Entre Ríos Province and surrounding areas through repeaters. It is mainly operated by Grupo Neomedia.

== History ==
On 23 May 1984, the Federal Broadcasting Committee, through Resolution 419, authorized the provincial government to install a repeater in the city of Paraná, capital of the province of Entre Ríos, to retransmit the state network ATC. The channel was operated by the provincial government. In addition, it broadcast its own programming for a few hours. The license began its regular broadcasts on 22 April 1985 as LRI 450 TV Canal 9 de Paraná.

At that time, the province still did not have its own television station and depended on the stations from Santa Fe or Buenos Aires. With the endorsement of then-governor Sergio Montiel (1983-1987), the station was organized and launched, with Reynaldo Adrián Puig as its first director. Víctor González, Alfredo Pintos (head of news), Jano Colcerniani, Eduardo Camargo, Raúl Galanti, Santiago Rinaldi and Inés Ghiggi were the first presenters of the channel, with Rubén Noble as technical manager and Tati Vieyra as commercial manager.

Its first broadcasts were made from two rooms equipped on the 4th floor of the Retirement Fund building and the transmission plant at the Paraná Seminary. In the first years, viewers in the city of Victoria had to point their VHF antennas towards the capital of Entry to be able to receive the signal – of poor quality – from Channel 9, until the station installed a repeater in the town of Febre.

On 25 November 1997, Australian company Prime Television Ltd. announced the purchase of the Canal 9 Libertad network and its stations (including Canal 9 Paraná) for approximately US$150 million. Said transaction was completed the following month. In January 1998, 50% of the network had been handed over to Torneos y Competencias; while, by March 1999, TyC co-owned such percentage with Atlántida Comunicaciones through AC Inversora.

In October 1999, by means of Resolution 1639, Secretaría de Comunicaciones authorized Canal 9 to conduct digital terrestrial test broadcasts on VHF channel 8 in the ATSC standard.

On 6 August 2001, Prime Television announced that the remaining 50% it had in Azul Televisión was sold to JP Morgan Chase for US$67,5 million; however, the finance did not have the maintenance of the station in Buenos Aires or its regional assets (including Canal 9 Litoral) as its plans for a long time. However, in 2004, Canal 9 was acquired by Grupo Neomedia.

In January 2005, Canal 9 became an affiliate of Artear's Canal 13.

AFSCA, by means of resolutions 304 of 7 September 2010, and 1037 of 30 August 2011, authorized Canal 9 to hold digital terrestrial signal tests, this time on the new ISDB-T format, on UHF channel 43.

On 3 January 2014, The channel began broadcasting programming in HD.

On 31 March 2015, the Federal Authority for Audiovisual Communication Services, through Resolution 236, granted Canal 9 physical channel 35.1 for its regular broadcasts (in HD format) on digital terrestrial television.
