= Koluel Kayke =

Coordinates: 46°43′S 68°14′W

- Municipality and village
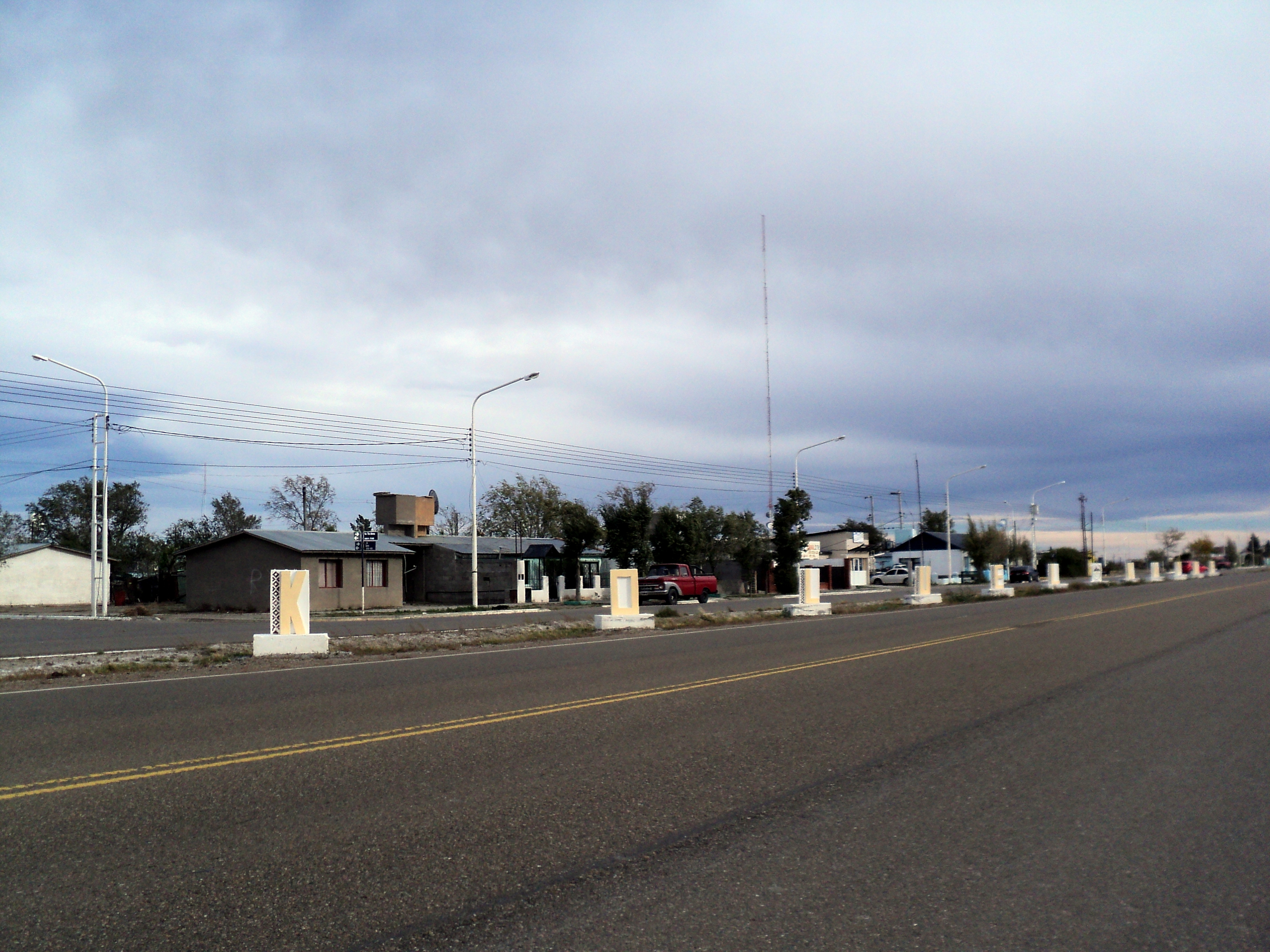
- Interactive map of Koluel Kayke
- Country: Argentina
- Province: Santa Cruz Province
- Department: Deseado Department
- Time zone: UTC−3 (ART)
- Climate: BSk

Koluel Kayke is a village and municipality in Santa Cruz Province in southern Argentina.
