= Channel 9 virtual TV stations in Mexico =

The following television stations operate on virtual channel 9 in Mexico:

== Nu9ve stations ==
35 stations on channel 9 carry Nu9ve programming.

== Other local stations ==
- CORTV in the state of Oaxaca
- XHUJED-TDT in Durango, Durango
- XHSLS-TDT in San Luis Potosí, San Luis Potosí
- XERV-TDT in Reynosa, Tamaulipas
