= Channel 9 (La Rioja, Argentina) =

TV station in La Rioja, Argentina

LV 91 TV Canal 9
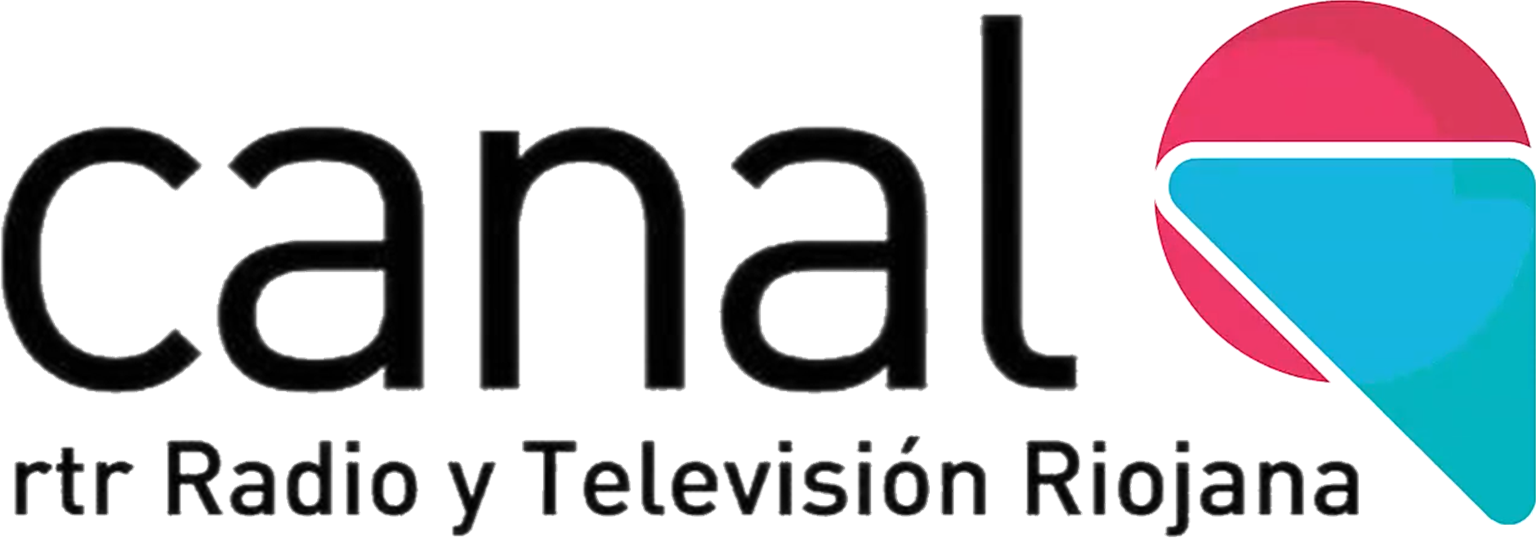
- La Rioja; Argentina
- City: La Rioja
- Channels: Analog: 9 (VHF); Digital: 29 (UHF)
- Branding: Canal Nueve

Programming
- Affiliations: Televisión Pública

Ownership
- Owner: Government of La Rioja; (Radio Televisión Riojana S.E.)
- Sister stations: FM La Torre 101.9

History
- First air date: 1964
- Former affiliations: Telefe (1990-2020)

Technical information
- Licensing authority: ENACOM

Links
- Website: https://radioytelevisionriojana.com.ar/canal9/

RTR ("Radio Televisión Riojana", call sign LV 91 TV) is an Argentine television station operated by the government of La Rioja Province and broadcasting on channel 9. It serves the provinces of La Rioja and Catamarca (through a repeater on channel 13), and a small part of San Luis. The station broadcasts from La Rioja, capital of the province.

RTR produces two newscasts: one with local news and other with news from Catamarca. A weekend cultural show called La Rioja que Usted no Conoce ("The La Rioja You Don't Know") is also presented.

Most of the schedule is filled with the network offerings: soap operas, national news, movies, sitcoms and cartoons. This changed in March 2020 when it left behind its Telefe affiliation and became an affiliate of Televisión Pública Argentina, allowing an increase in its local productions.

== Local programming ==
- Noticiero 9 ("News 9") - newscast
- Catamarca es noticia ("Catamarca is on the news") - newscast
- Queda mucho por descubrir ("There's a lot to discover") - travelogue
- Misa Dominical ("Sunday Mass") - religion
