= Channel 9 TV stations in Canada =

The following television stations broadcast on digital or analog channel 9 in Canada:

Name	Logo	Place	First air date
CBET-DT		Windsor, Ontario	September 16, 1954 (71 years ago)
CBKT-DT		Regina, Saskatchewan	December 21, 1962 (63 years ago)
CBOFT-DT		Ottawa, Ontario	June 24, 1955 (70 years ago)
CFTF-DT-5		Baie-Comeau, Quebec	June 28, 1988 (37 years ago)
CFTO-DT		Toronto, Ontario	December 31, 1960 (65 years ago)
CHAU-DT-10		Tracadie, New Brunswick	October 17, 1959 (66 years ago)
CHMG-TV		Quebec City, Quebec	—
CICO-DT-9		Thunder Bay, Ontario	September 27, 1970 (55 years ago)
CIMT-DT		Rivière-du-Loup, Quebec	September 17, 1978 (47 years ago)
CIPA-TV		Prince Albert, Saskatchewan	January 12, 1987 (39 years ago)
CIVG-DT		Sept-Îles, Quebec	January 19, 1975 (51 years ago)
CJCB-TV-2		Antigonish, Nova Scotia	October 9, 1954 (71 years ago)
CKLT-DT		Saint John, New Brunswick	September 21, 1969 (56 years ago)
CKSH-DT		Sherbrooke, Quebec	September 19, 1974 (51 years ago)
CKVR-DT		Barrie, Ontario	September 28, 1955 (70 years ago)

== Defunct ==
- CKNC-TV in Sudbury, Ontario
- CFCN-TV-3 in Brooks, Alberta
- CFJC-TV-4 in Clinton, British Columbia
- CHAN-TV-5 in Brackendale, British Columbia
- CHAN-TV-7 in Whistler, British Columbia
- CHBC-TV-4 in Salmon Arm, British Columbia
- CHKM-TV-1 in Pritchard, British Columbia
- CHRP-TV-2 in Revelstoke, British Columbia
- CIHF-TV-6 in Bridgewater, Nova Scotia
- CISA-TV-5 in Pincher Creek, Alberta
- CITO-TV-4 in Chapleau, Ontario
- CJCB-TV-3 in Dingwall, Nova Scotia
- CJDG-TV-4 in Matagami, Quebec
- CKAM-TV-3 in Blackville, New Brunswick
- CKRN-DT in Rouyn-Noranda, Quebec
- CKSA-TV-2 in Bonnyville, Alberta
- CKYT-TV in Thompson, Manitoba
