= Televisão Independente de Moçambique =

Former Mozambican television channel

TIM
- Country: Mozambique
- Broadcast area: Mozambique

Ownership
- Owner: Grupo INSITEC

History
- Launched: 2006
- Closed: 2020
- Former names: 9TV (2006-2007)

Televisão Independente de Moçambique, abbreviated TIM, was a Mozambican commercial terrestrial television network founded in 2006 as 9TV.

== History ==
TIM started broadcasting as 9TV in 2006. It was owned in its early years by Bruno Morgado, son of Carlos Alberto Morgado, minister of industry and commerce of Joaquim Chissano's government. Other media outlets included 9FM, the sports newspaper Bola 9 (out of circulation by 2008) and an advertising agency, BM9 Estúdios (using the initials of Bruno Morgado). A 2005 MISA report denounced the existence of a pirate television station that was broadcasting, among other things, pornographic content, and shortly after these events, two new channels appeared: 9TV and TV Maná Moçambique, the latter of which owned by the Portuguese Maná Church.

On June 28, 2006, the channel signed an agreement with TV da Gente, an Afro-Brazilian network. The channel aimed primarily at a younger demographic than other well-established channels already in the market, as well as rebroadcasting content from the pan-African music network Channel O.

Still as 9TV, the channel started airing programming from the Worldwide Church of God's Power (current owners of KTV) in order to increase its revenue that, otherwise, wouldn't be covered by advertising alone.

In January 2008, reports emerged that the Portuguese businessman Pais do Amaral, former owner of TVI, bought 60% of the company's shares for US$750,000. This was seen as an infringement of the local laws, as foreign ownership was restricted to 20% of the shares of a company. The output at the time excluded news and cultural programming. It was expected that TIM's coverage would expand by the end of the first half of 2008, excluding Niassa Province. In 2008, the channel aside from IMPD programming and rebroadcasts of Channel O had a handful of foreign movies (American and Bollywood) and the US series Roswell, Law and Order, The OC and 24 in its line-up.

The channel moved to a higher slot on ZAP in 2020. About 50 staff members declared strike in late June 2020 for two and a half years of unpaid salaries.
