= Fitz Roy, Santa Cruz =

Coordinates: 47°02′S 67°15′W

Fitz Roy (Santa Cruz)
- Municipality and town
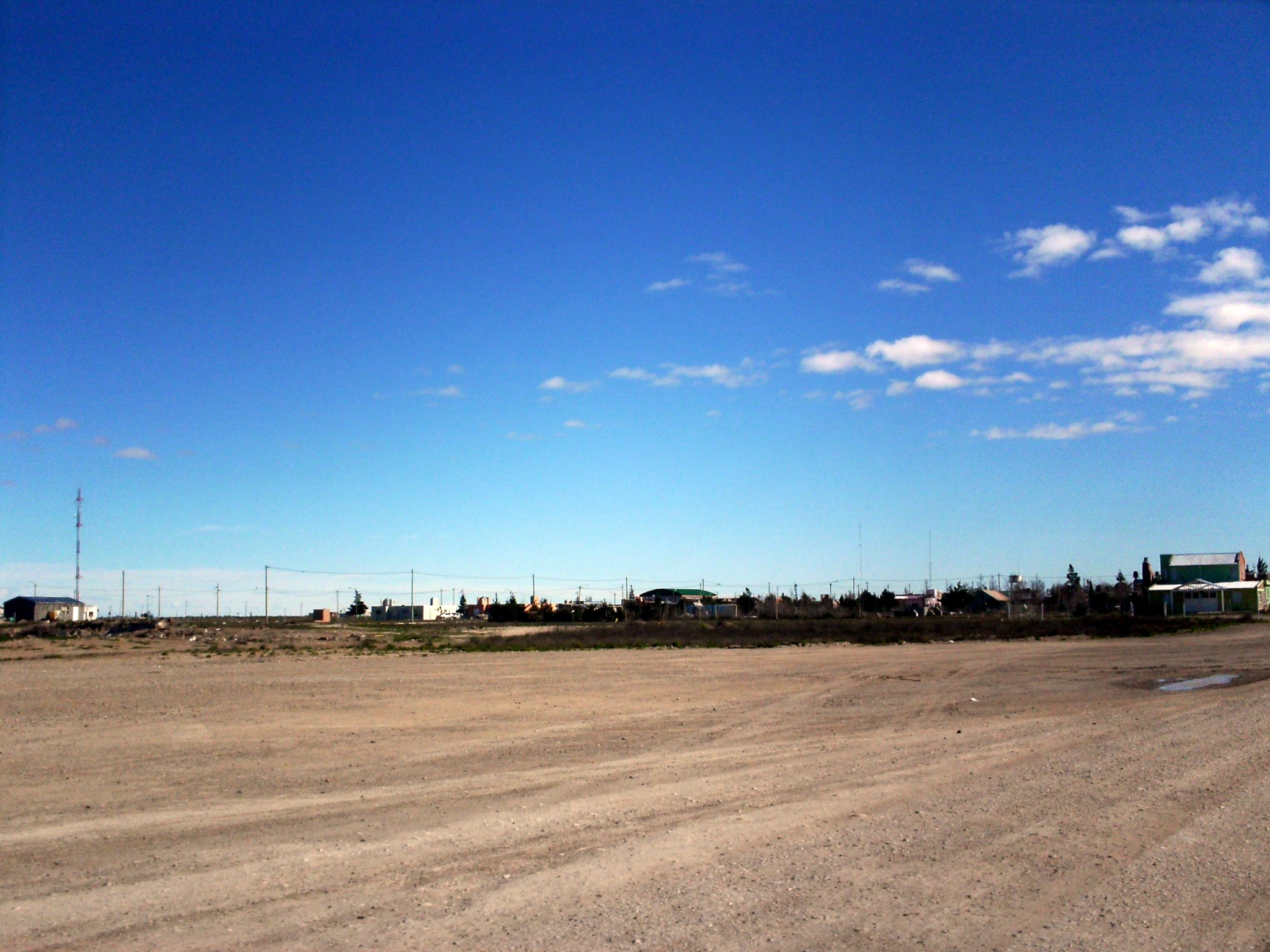
- The town of Fitz roy from route 3
- Interactive map of Fitz Roy (Santa Cruz)
- Country: Argentina
- Province: Santa Cruz Province
- Department: Deseado Department
- Time zone: UTC−3 (ART)
- Climate: BSk

Fitz Roy (Santa Cruz) is a town and municipality in Santa Cruz Province in southern Argentina.
