= Jaramillo, Santa Cruz =

Jaramillo
- Municipality and village
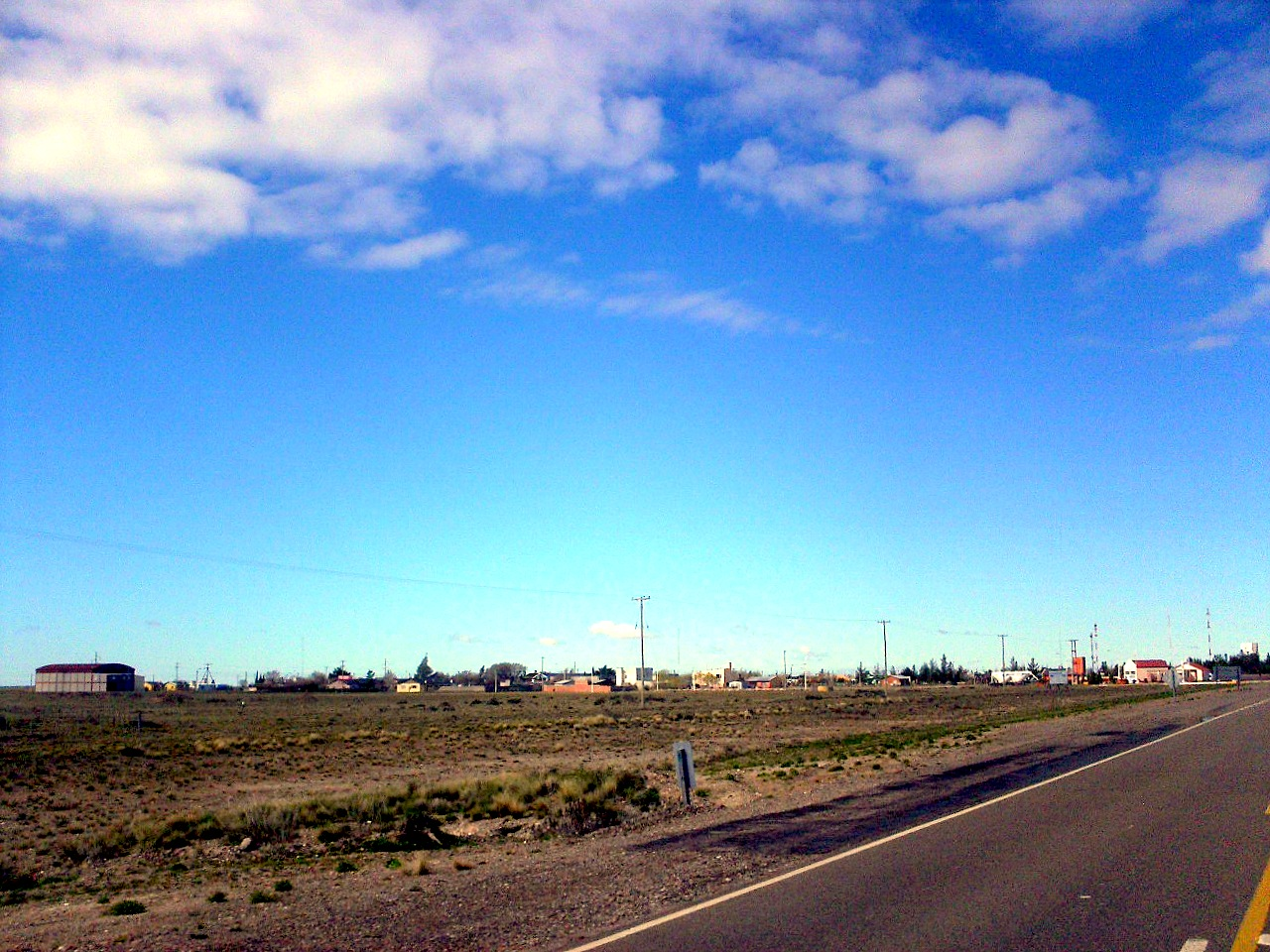

- Location within Argentina
- Coordinates: 47°11′S 67°9′W
- Country: Argentina
- Province: Santa Cruz Province
- Department: Deseado
- Time zone: UTC−3 (ART)
- Climate: BSk

Jaramillo is a village and municipality in Santa Cruz Province in southern Argentina.
