= Cañadón Seco =

Coordinates: 46°33′S 67°35′W

- Municipality and village
- Interactive map of Cañadón Seco
- Country: Argentina
- Province: Santa Cruz Province
- Department: Deseado Department
- Time zone: UTC−3 (ART)
- Climate: BSk

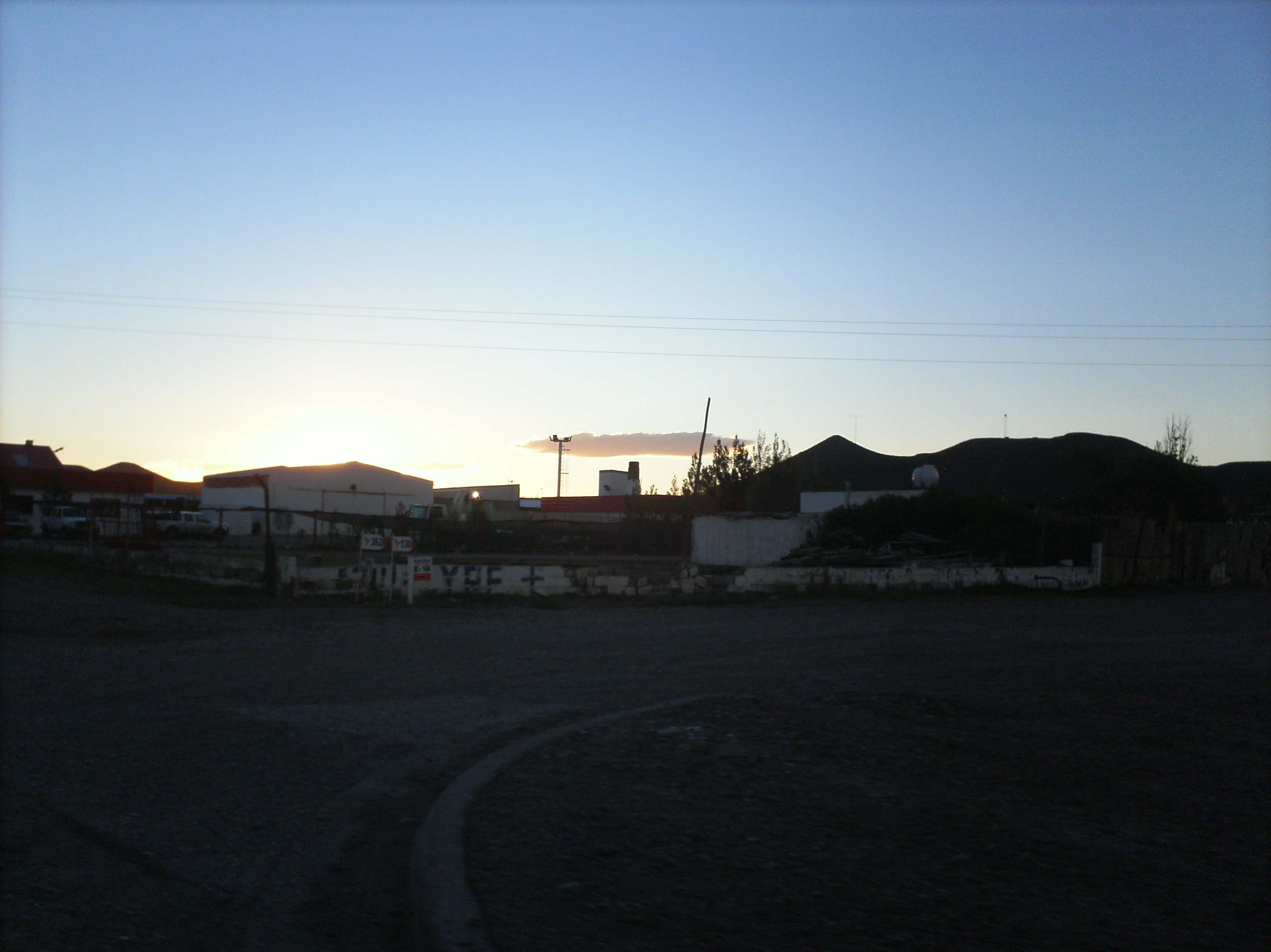
Cañadón Seco

Cañadón Seco is a village and municipality in Santa Cruz Province in southern Argentina.
